= 1932 Maine gubernatorial election =

- September 12, 1932
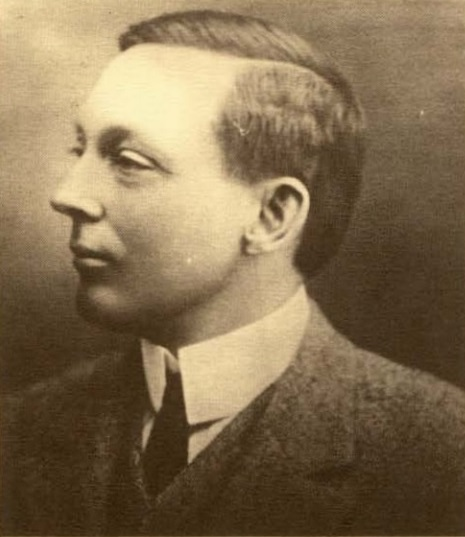

Nominee	Louis J. Brann	Burleigh Martin
Party	Democratic	Republican
Popular vote	121,158	118,800
Percentage	50.25%	49.28%
- County results Brann: 40–50% 50–60% 60–70% Martin: 50–60%
Governor before election
William Tudor Gardiner
Republican
Elected Governor
Louis J. Brann
Democratic

The 1932 Maine gubernatorial election took place on September 12, 1932. Incumbent Republican Governor William Tudor Gardiner did not seek re-election. Democratic candidate Louis J. Brann defeated Republican candidate Burleigh Martin. Brann was the first Democrat elected Governor of Maine since Oakley C. Curtis in 1914, and the first Democrat to receive a majority of the popular vote since Frederick W. Plaisted in 1910. This election ended a streak of eight consecutive Republican gubernatorial victories in Maine.

== Results ==
1932 Maine gubernatorial election
Party	Candidate	Votes	%	±%
Democratic	Louis J. Brann	121,158	50.25%	
Republican	Burleigh Martin	118,800	49.28%	
Socialist	Frank H. Maxfield	1,137	0.47%	
Majority		2,358	0.98%	
Turnout		241,095	100.00%	
Democratic gain from Republican		Swing		
