= 1886 Maine gubernatorial election =

- September 13, 1886
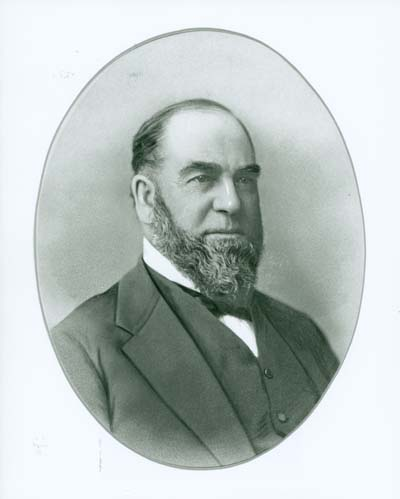

Nominee	Joseph R. Bodwell	Clark S. Edwards
Party	Republican	Democratic
Popular vote	68,850	55,289
Percentage	53.72%	43.14%
- County results Bodwell: 50–60% 60–70% Edwards: 40–50%
Governor before election
Frederick Robie
Republican
Elected Governor
Joseph R. Bodwell
Republican

The 1886 Maine gubernatorial election was held on September 13, 1886, in order to elect the Governor of Maine. Republican nominee and former Mayor of Hallowell Joseph R. Bodwell defeated Democratic nominee Clark S. Edwards and Prohibition nominee Aaron Clark.

== General election ==
On election day, September 13, 1886, Republican nominee Joseph R. Bodwell won the election by a margin of 13,561 votes against his foremost opponent Democratic nominee Clark S. Edwards, thereby retaining Republican control over the office of governor. Bodwell was sworn in as the 40th Governor of Maine on January 5, 1887.

=== Results ===
Maine gubernatorial election, 1886
Party	Candidate	Votes	%
Republican	Joseph R. Bodwell	68,850	53.72
Democratic	Clark S. Edwards	55,289	43.14
Prohibition	Aaron Clark	3,851	3.01
	Scattering	181	0.13
Total votes		128,171	100.00
Republican hold			
