= 1916 United States Senate election in Maine =

- September 11, 1916
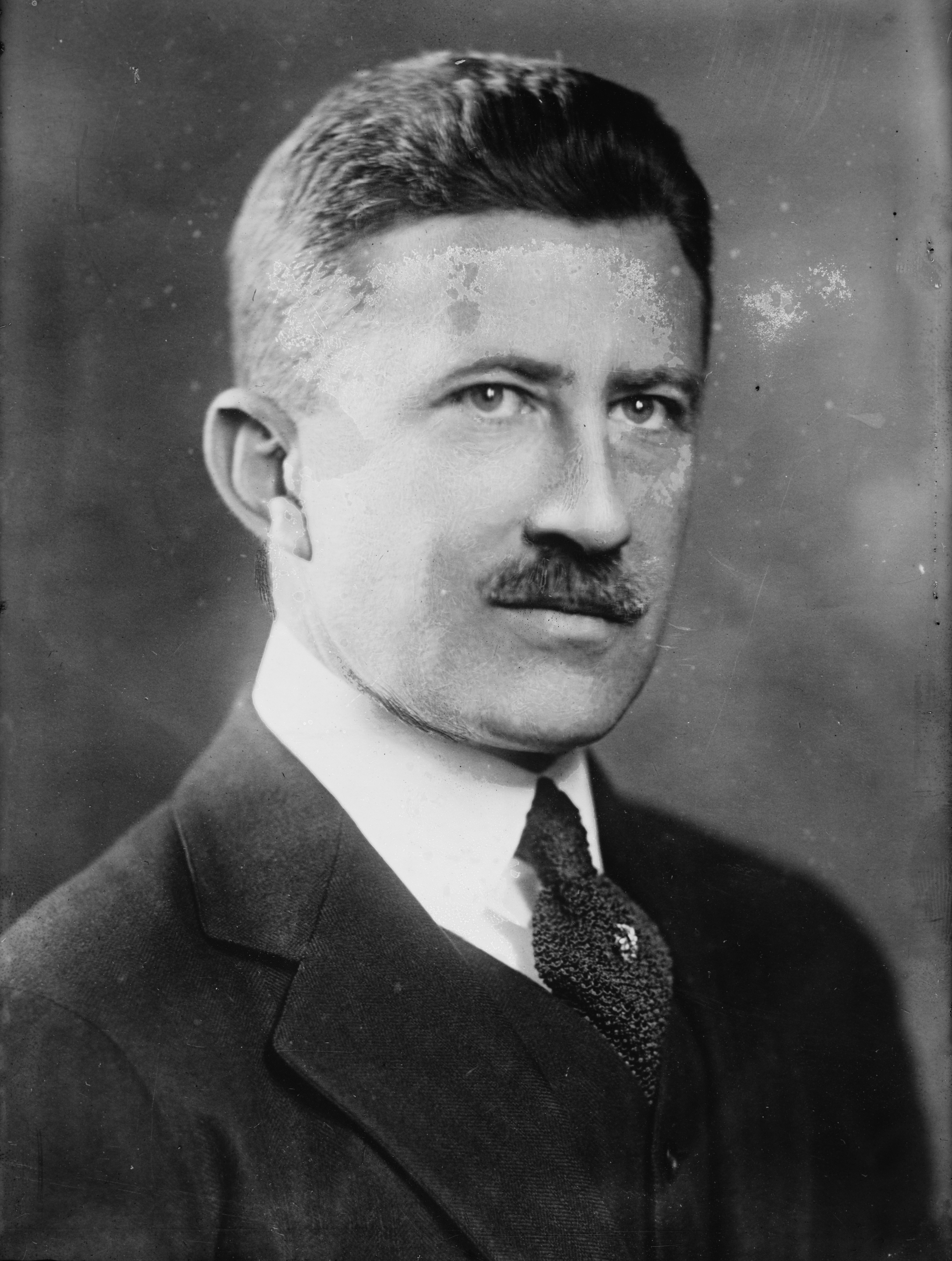

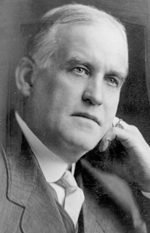
Nominee	Frederick Hale	Charles F. Johnson
Party	Republican	Democratic
Popular vote	79,481	69,486
Percentage	52.72%	46.09%
- County results Hale: 40–50% 50–60% 60–70% Johnson: 50–60%
U.S. senator before election
Charles F. Johnson
Democratic
Elected U.S. Senator
Frederick Hale
Republican

The 1916 United States Senate election in Maine was held on September 11, 1916.

Incumbent Democratic Senator Charles F. Johnson ran for re-election to a second term in office, but was defeated by Republican Frederick Hale, the son of Johnson's predecessor Eugene Hale.

== Democratic primary ==
=== Candidates ===
- Charles F. Johnson, incumbent Senator since 1911

=== Results ===
Senator Johnson was unopposed in the Democratic primary.

1916 Democratic U.S. Senate primary
Party	Candidate	Votes	%
Democratic	Charles F. Johnson (incumbent)	14,599	99.95%
Write-in		8	0.06%
Total votes		14,607	100.00%

== Republican primary ==
=== Candidates ===
- Bert M. Fernald, former Governor of Maine (1909–11)
- Frederick Hale, former State Representative from Portland (1905–06) and Republican National Committeeman
- Ira Hersey, State Senator from Houlton and President of the Maine Senate

=== Results ===
1916 Republican U.S. Senate primary
Party	Candidate	Votes	%
Republican	Frederick Hale	17,027	37.01%
Republican	Bert M. Fernald	15,368	33.40%
Republican	Ira Hersey	13,617	29.59%
Total votes		46,012	100.00%

Three days before the primary, Maine's other U.S. Senator Edwin C. Burleigh died. After losing this primary, Fernald ran to complete Burleigh's unexpired term and won.

Hersey ran for and won the election to Maine's 4th congressional district, which was vacated by Frank E. Guernsey, who also ran in the special election for Senate.

== Socialist primary ==
=== Candidates ===
- James F. Carey, former Massachusetts State Representative from Haverhill (1900–04)

=== Results ===
1916 Socialist U.S. Senate primary
Party	Candidate	Votes	%
Socialist	James F. Carey	198	100.00%
Total votes		198	100.00%

== Progressive primary ==
=== Candidates ===
- George C. Webber

=== Results ===
1916 Progressive U.S. Senate primary
Party	Candidate	Votes	%
Progressive	George C. Webber	186	100.00%
Total votes		186	100.00%

== General election ==
=== Candidates ===
- James F. Carey, former Massachusetts State Representative from Haverhill, Massachusetts (Socialist)
- Frederick Hale, former State Representative from Portland (1905–06) and Republican National Committeeman (Republican)
- Arthur C. Johnson (Prohibition)
- Charles F. Johnson, incumbent Senator since 1911 (Democratic)

=== Results ===
1916 U.S. Senate election in Maine
Party	Candidate	Votes	%
Republican	Frederick Hale	79,481	52.72%
Democratic	Charles F. Johnson (incumbent)	69,486	46.09%
Socialist	James F. Carey	1,510	1.00%
Prohibition	Arthur C. Johnson	279	0.19%
Write-in		7	0.01%
Total votes		150,763	100.00%

== See also ==
- 1916 United States Senate elections
