= 1888 Maine gubernatorial election =

- September 10, 1888
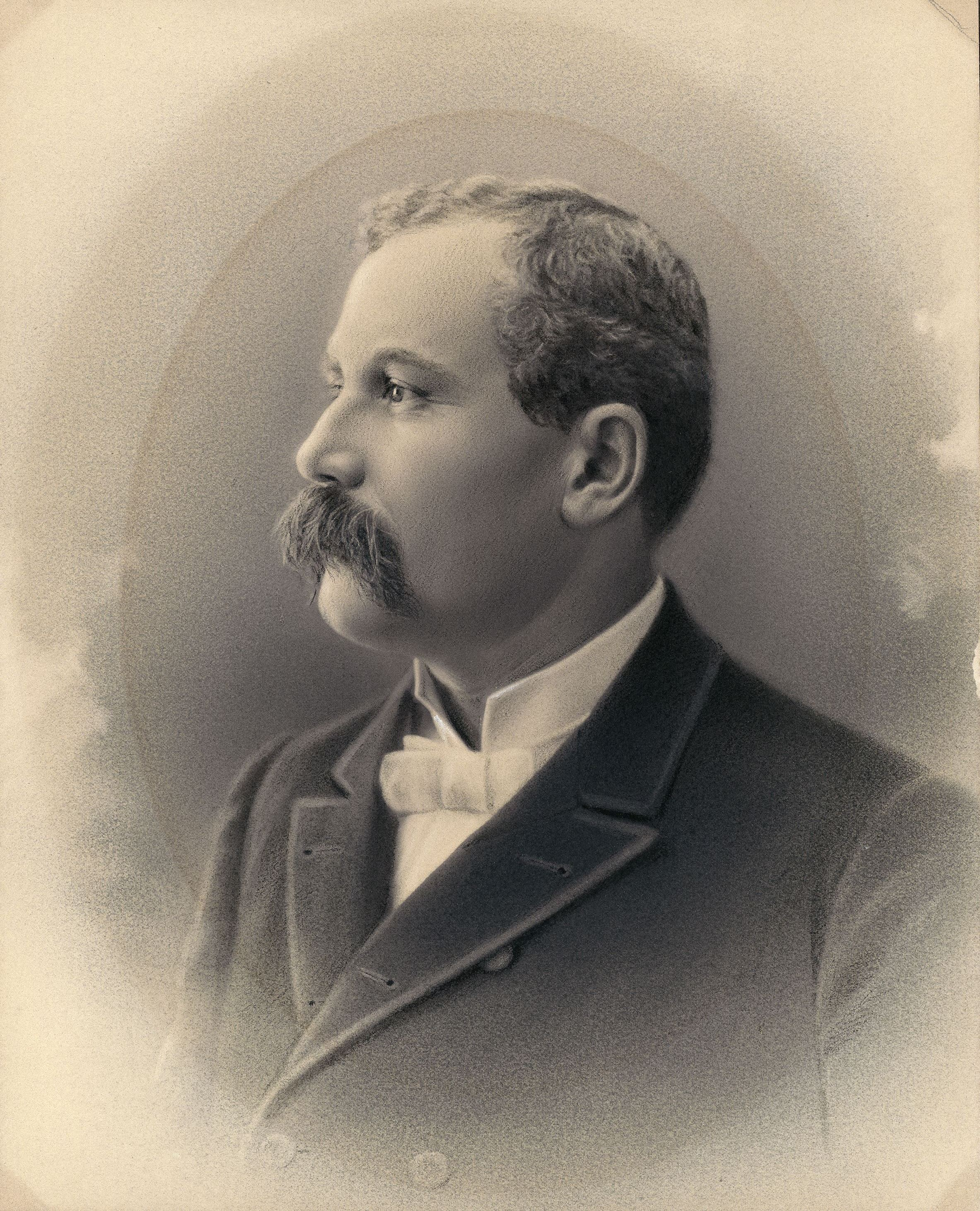

Nominee	Edwin C. Burleigh	William LeBaron Putnam
Party	Republican	Democratic
Popular vote	79,401	61,348
Percentage	54.61%	42.19%
- County results Burleigh: 40–50% 50–60% 60–70%
Governor before election
Sebastian Streeter Marble (Acting)
Republican
Elected Governor
Edwin C. Burleigh
Republican

The 1888 Maine gubernatorial election was held on September 10, 1888, in order to elect the Governor of Maine. Republican nominee and former Treasurer of Maine Edwin C. Burleigh defeated Democratic nominee and former Mayor of Portland William LeBaron Putnam, Prohibition nominee Volney B. Cushing and Labor nominee William H. Simmons.

== General election ==
On election day, September 10, 1888, Republican nominee Edwin C. Burleigh won the election by a margin of 18,053 votes against his foremost opponent Democratic nominee William LeBaron Putnam, thereby retaining Republican control over the office of governor. Burleigh was sworn in as the 42nd Governor of Maine on January 2, 1889.

=== Results ===
Maine gubernatorial election, 1888
Party	Candidate	Votes	%
Republican	Edwin C. Burleigh	79,401	54.61
Democratic	William LeBaron Putnam	61,348	42.19
Prohibition	Volney B. Cushing	3,109	2.14
Labor	William H. Simmons	1,526	1.05
	Scattering	20	0.01
Total votes		145,404	100.00
Republican hold			
