= Charles F. Johnson =

American judge and politician

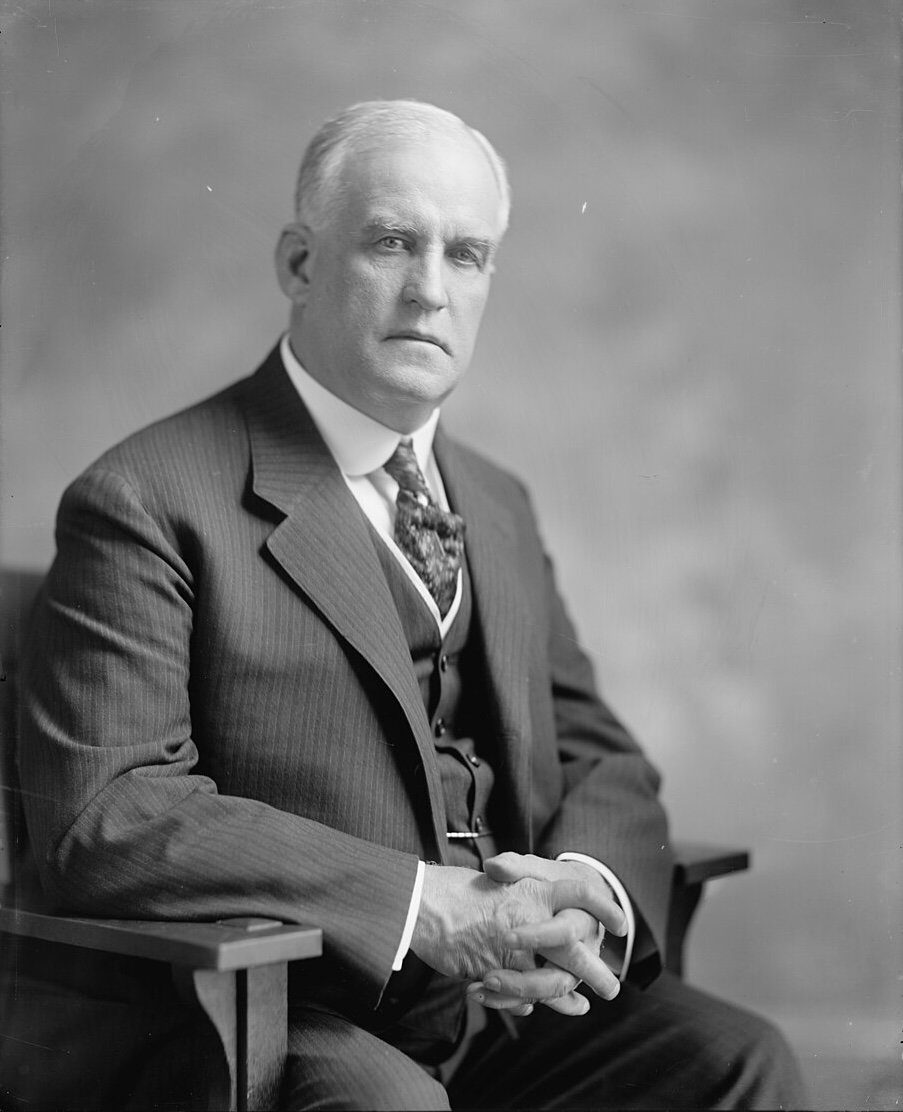

Senior Judge of the United States Court of Appeals for the First Circuit
- In office April 30, 1929 – February 15, 1930

Judge of the United States Court of Appeals for the First Circuit
- In office October 1, 1917 – April 30, 1929
- Appointed by: Woodrow Wilson
- Preceded by: William LeBaron Putnam
- Succeeded by: Scott Wilson

United States Senator from Maine
- In office March 4, 1911 – March 3, 1917
- Preceded by: Eugene Hale
- Succeeded by: Frederick Hale

4th Mayor of Waterville
- In office 1893
- Preceded by: Edgar L. Jones
- Succeeded by: Christian Knauff

Personal details
- Born: Charles Fletcher Johnson; February 14, 1859 Winslow, Maine, U.S.
- Died: February 15, 1930 (aged 71) St. Petersburg, Florida, U.S.
- Resting place: Pine Grove Cemetery; Waterville, Maine, U.S.
- Party: Democratic
- Education: Bowdoin College (AB) read law

Charles Fletcher Johnson (February 14, 1859 – February 15, 1930) was a United States senator from Maine and a United States circuit judge of the United States Court of Appeals for the First Circuit.

Johnson was nominated by President Woodrow Wilson on October 1, 1917, to a seat vacated by William LeBaron Putnam. He was confirmed by the United States Senate on October 1, 1917, and received commission the same day. Assumed senior status on April 30, 1929. Johnson's service was terminated on February 15, 1930, due to death.

== Education and career ==
Born on February 14, 1859, in Winslow, Kennebec County, Maine, Johnson attended the common schools and Waterville Classical Institute. He received an Artium Baccalaureus degree in 1879 from Bowdoin College and read law in 1886. He was principal of the high school of Machias, Washington County, Maine from 1881 to 1886. He was admitted to the bar and entered private practice in Waterville, Maine from 1886 to 1911. He was an unsuccessful candidate for Governor of Maine in 1892 and 1894. He was elected Mayor of Waterville in 1893, but left that office in 1894. He was a member of the Maine House of Representatives in 1905 and 1907.

== Congressional service ==
Johnson was elected as a Democrat to the United States Senate in 1910 and served from March 4, 1911, until March 3, 1917. He was an unsuccessful candidate for reelection in 1916. He was Chairman of the Committee on National Banks (63rd United States Congress), Committee on Fisheries (64th United States Congress) and the Committee on Pensions (64th United States Congress).

== Federal judicial service ==
Johnson was nominated by President Woodrow Wilson on October 1, 1917, to a seat on the United States Court of Appeals for the First Circuit vacated by Judge William LeBaron Putnam. He was confirmed by the United States Senate on October 1, 1917, and received his commission the same day. He assumed senior status on April 30, 1929. His service terminated on February 15, 1930, due to his death while on a visit to St. Petersburg, Florida. He was interred in Pine Grove Cemetery in Waterville.

== Sources ==
- United States Congress. "Charles F. Johnson (id: J000124)". Biographical Directory of the United States Congress.

Party political offices
Preceded by William P. Thompson	Democratic nominee for Governor of Maine; 1892, 1894	Succeeded by Melvin P. Frank
First	Democratic nominee for U.S. senator from Maine (Class 1); 1916	Succeeded by Oakley C. Curtis
U.S. Senate
Preceded by Eugene Hale	U.S. senator (Class 1) from Maine; 1911–1917; Served alongside: William P. Frye, Obadiah Gardner, Edwin C. Burleigh, Bert M. Fernald	Succeeded by Frederick Hale
Legal offices
Preceded by William LeBaron Putnam	Judge of the United States Court of Appeals for the First Circuit; 1917–1929	Succeeded by Scott Wilson
