= Frederick Hale (American politician) =

American politician (1874–1963)

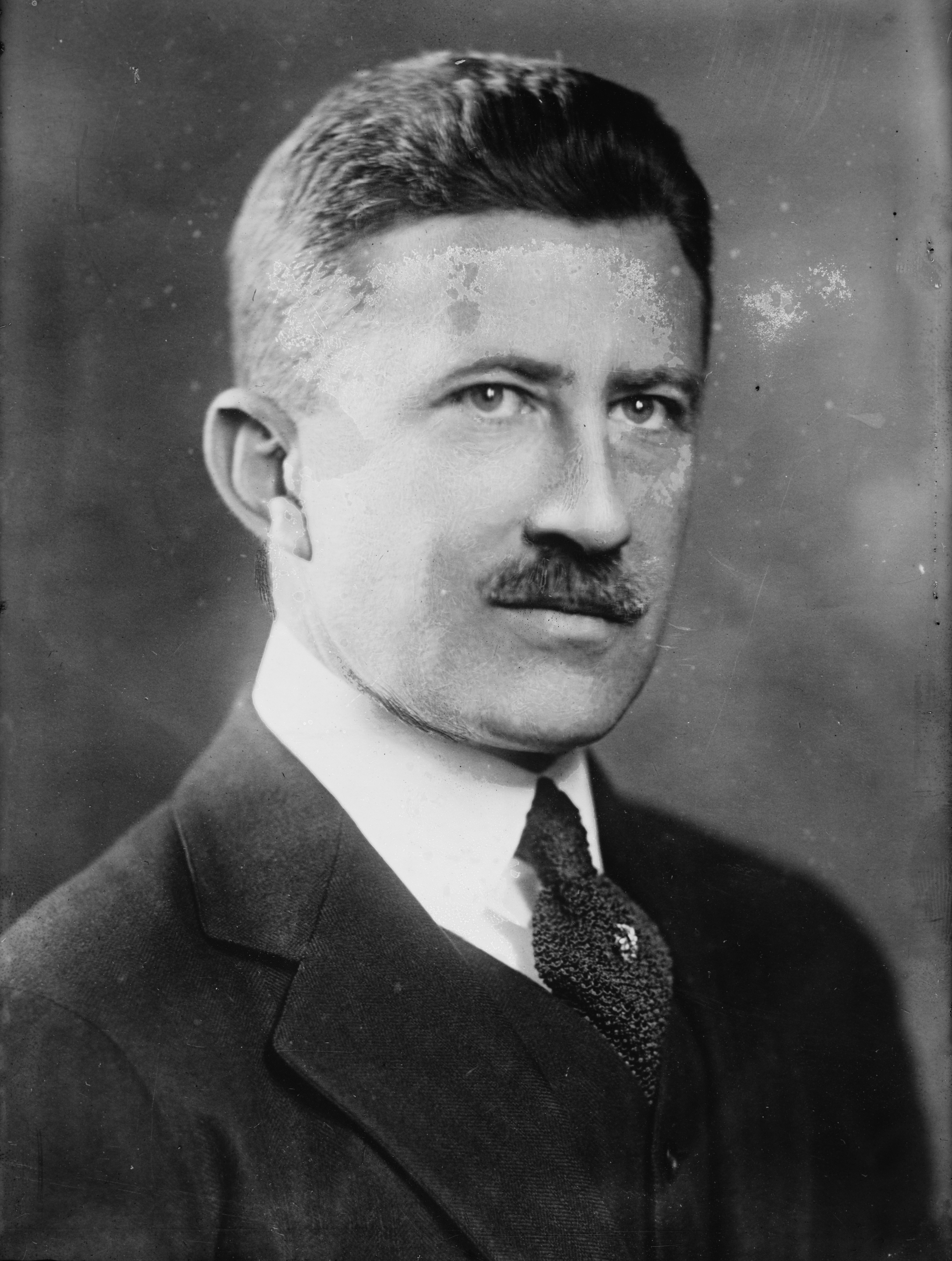

United States Senator from Maine
- In office March 4, 1917 – January 3, 1941
- Preceded by: Charles Johnson
- Succeeded by: Owen Brewster

Member of the Maine House of Representatives from Portland
- In office January 4, 1905 – January 2, 1907

Personal details
- Born: October 7, 1874 Detroit, Michigan, U.S.
- Died: September 28, 1963 (aged 88) Portland, Maine, U.S.
- Party: Republican
- Parents: Eugene Hale; Mary Chandler Hale
- Relatives: Chandler Hale (brother); Zachariah Chandler (grandfather); Robert Hale (cousin)
- Education: Harvard University (BA); Columbia University

Frederick Hale (October 7, 1874 – September 28, 1963) was the United States senator from Maine from 1917 to 1941. He was the son of Eugene Hale and the grandson of Zachariah Chandler, both also U.S. senators. He was the brother of diplomat Chandler Hale, and the cousin of U.S. Representative Robert Hale.

== Biography ==
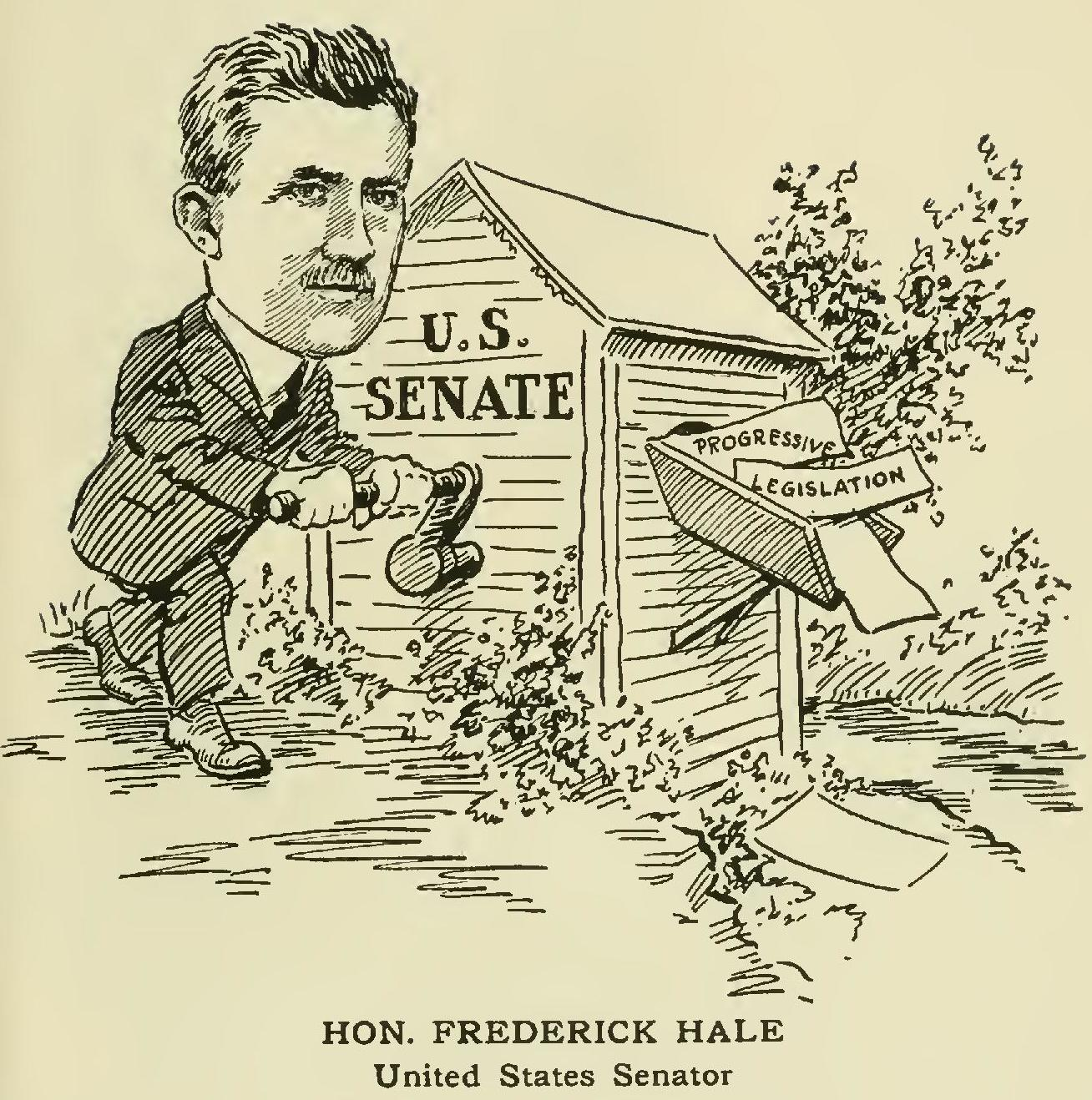
Frederick Hale, United States Senator, “Progressive Legislation” art in 1918 book, Mother Goose comes to Portland

Hale was born on October 7, 1874, in Detroit, Michigan, to Eugene Hale. He attended the Lawrenceville School, and graduated from Groton School in 1892. He graduated from Harvard University in 1896 and attended Columbia Law School in New York City from 1896 to 1897. He was admitted to the bar and commenced the practice of law in Portland, Maine, in 1899.

Hale was a Republican member of the Maine House of Representatives, 1905–1906; and a member of the Republican National Committee, 1912-1918. In 1916, he was elected as a Republican to the United States Senate, defeating incumbent Democrat Charles Fletcher Johnson to reclaim the Senate seat that had been held by his father Eugene Hale.

He was reelected in 1922, 1928, and again in 1934, serving from March 4, 1917, to January 3, 1941.

Hale opposed and voted against the Sedition Act of 1918 during the presidency of Woodrow Wilson. He also opposed United States entry to the League of Nations.

During the presidency of Calvin Coolidge, a proposal was made by fellow Republican senator Reed Smoot of Utah to reduce the top income tax rate to 32%. Although the majority of the GOP, including Hale, supported the measure, it was defeated in a 36–47 vote. Hale also voted against an amendment introduced by Furnifold Simmons to raise the maximum income tax rate by 2.5%.

In the 1928 Republican primary, Hale defeated incumbent governor Owen Brewster for their party's nomination which signaled the end of the Ku Klux Klan in Maine as an important political factor in the state.

He was not a candidate for renomination in 1940. He served as chairman, Committee on Canadian Relations in the Sixty-sixth Congress, and served on the Committee on Naval Affairs in the Sixty-eighth through Seventy-second Congresses, and the Committee on Appropriations in the Seventy-second Congress.

A fierce opponent of the Ku Klux Klan faction of the Republican Party in Maine, Hale was one of a handful of senators who voted against the elevation of Hugo Black to the Supreme Court in 1937 based on his alleged Klan membership.

Hale opposed the presidency of Franklin D. Roosevelt and its New Deal programs. at an even greater frequency than his Maine senatorial colleague Wallace H. White. This included his vote against the National Labor Relations Act (Wagner Act), which White supported.

He retired to private life and died in Portland, Maine, on September 28, 1963. He is interred in Woodbine Cemetery in Ellsworth, Maine. At the time of his death, Hale was the last living senator who was serving at the time of the United States' declaration of war against the German Empire, which precipitated the United States' participation in World War I.

== Charles Thornton Libby incident ==
In May 1910, Hale attacked Charles Thornton Libby with a whip following an article about Hale's mother that was published in the Six Towns Times, of which Libby was the editor. Hale had entered Libby's office in Portland, holding a copy of the newspaper, and asked, "Are you responsible for this?" Libby looked at it and replied in the affirmative. Hale pulled a whip out from under his coat and struck Libby several times, saying, "Take that, you cur." Hale then threw the whip on the office floor and struck Libby. "This is what I do to anyone who insults my mother." After Hale left, Libby said: "I like him better than I did before. It was a manly thing to do. A man who wouldn't stand up for his mother don't amount to much."

Party political offices
First	Republican nominee for U.S. Senator from Maine (Class 1); 1916, 1922, 1928, 1934	Succeeded by Owen Brewster
Preceded by James Wolcott Wadsworth Jr.	Secretary of the Senate Republican Conference; 1927–1941	Succeeded by Wallace H. White Jr.
U.S. Senate
Preceded by Charles Johnson	U.S. Senator (Class 1) from Maine; 1917–1941; Served alongside: Bert Fernald, Arthur Gould, Wallace White	Succeeded by Owen Brewster
Preceded by John B. Kendrick	Chair of the Senate Canadian Relations Committee; 1919–1921	Position abolished
Preceded by Carroll S. Page	Chair of the Senate Naval Affairs Committee; 1923–1933	Succeeded by Park Trammell
Preceded by Wesley Livsey Jones	Chair of the Senate Appropriations Committee; 1932–1933	Succeeded by Carter Glass
