= Governor Milliken =

Governor Milliken may refer to:

- Carl Milliken (1877–1961), 1st Governor of Maine
- William Milliken (1922–2019), 44th Governor of Michigan
