= Obadiah Gardner =

American politician (1852–1938)

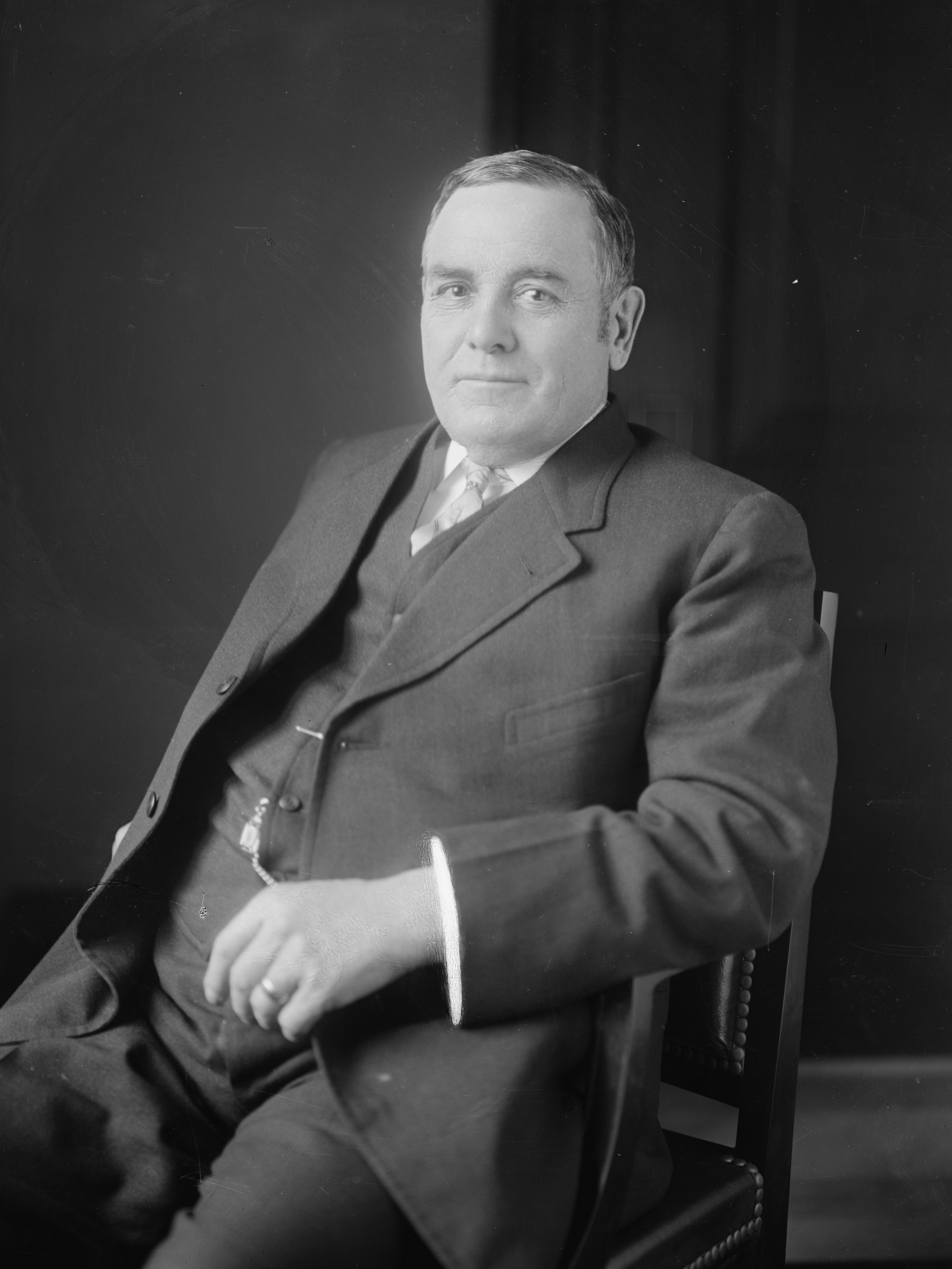

United States Senator from Maine
- In office September 23, 1911 – March 3, 1913
- Preceded by: William P. Frye
- Succeeded by: Edwin C. Burleigh

Personal details
- Born: September 13, 1852 near Port Huron, Michigan
- Died: July 24, 1938 (aged 85) Augusta, Maine
- Party: Democratic
- Education: Eastman Business College; Coburn Classical Institute

Obadiah Gardner (September 13, 1852 – July 24, 1938) was an American politician from the U.S. state of Maine. Gardner was a businessman and member of the Democratic Party who served in several minor state executive positions before serving in the United States Senate.

== Biography ==
Gardner was born near Port Huron, Michigan. In 1864 at the age of 12, he moved with his parents to Union, Maine, where he attended public schools. He studied at Eastman Business College in Poughkeepsie, New York and later at the Coburn Classical Institute in Waterville, Maine. After graduating he engaged in the agriculture business, including ventures in lumber, lime, and creameries in Rockland and cattle raising elsewhere.

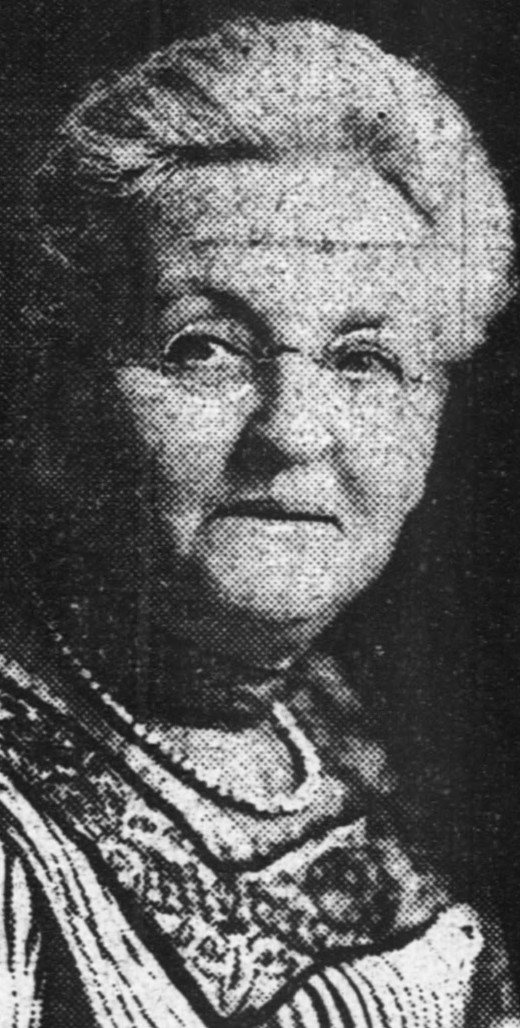
His wife in 1911

He was a member of the Maine Board of Agriculture and later the master of the Maine State Grange (1897–1907). In 1908, he launched an unsuccessful campaign to become governor, losing to Republican candidate Bert M. Fernald. In 1911, he was appointed as chairman of the Board of State Assessors, but resigned after being appointed and later elected Senator, filing the vacancy caused by the death of William P. Frye. Gardner served from September 23, 1911, until March 3, 1913, when he lost his bid for re-election. During this time, Gardner served in the Senate with fellow Democrat Charles Fletcher Johnson. It marked the first time since 1853 that two Democrats represented Maine in the United States Senate.

Following this defeat, he was appointed a member of the International Joint Commission created to prevent disputes between Canada and the United States over shared boundary waters. Later he became chairman of the American delegation, serving until his retirement in 1923.

Gardner returned to Rockland and later moved to Augusta, where he died. He is interred in the Achorn Cemetery in Rockland.

== Sources ==
- Media related to Obadiah Gardner at Wikimedia Commons
- United States Congress. "Obadiah Gardner (id: G000060)". Biographical Directory of the United States Congress.

Party political offices
Preceded by Cyrus W. Davis	Democratic nominee for Governor of Maine; 1908	Succeeded by Frederick W. Plaisted
U.S. Senate
Preceded by William P. Frye	U.S. senator (Class 2) from Maine; September 23, 1911 – March 3, 1913; Served alongside: Charles Johnson	Succeeded by Edwin C. Burleigh
Honorary titles
Preceded by Newell Sanders	Oldest living U.S. senator January 26, 1938 – July 24, 1938	Succeeded by Furnifold Simmons
