= Governor Plaisted =

Governor Plaisted may refer to:

- Frederick W. Plaisted (1865–1943), 48th Governor of Maine
- Harris M. Plaisted (1828–1898), 38th Governor of Maine
