= Burleigh Martin =

American politician

Burleigh Martin (September 3, 1888 – March 23, 1962) was an American politician from Maine. A Republican from Augusta, Maine, Martin served in the Maine Legislature from his election in 1922 until 1932. From 1923 to 1928, Martin served in the Maine House of Representatives. From 1927 to 1928, Martin was the House Speaker. Elected to the Maine Senate in 1928, Martin served until 1932. During his final term (1931–1932), Martin was elected Senate President.

In 1932, Martin was the Republican nominee for Governor of Maine. He lost to Democrat Louis J. Brann. Brann was the first Democrat elected Governor of Maine since Oakley C. Curtis in 1914.

Party political offices
Preceded by William Tudor Gardiner	Republican nominee for Governor of Maine; 1932	Succeeded by Alfred K. Ames
