= William LeBaron Putnam =

American judge (1835–1918)

Judge of the United States Court of Appeals for the First Circuit
- In office March 17, 1892 – September 17, 1917
- Appointed by: Benjamin Harrison
- Preceded by: Seat established by 26 Stat. 826
- Succeeded by: Charles Fletcher Johnson

Judge of the United States Circuit Courts for the First Circuit
- In office March 17, 1892 – December 31, 1911
- Appointed by: Benjamin Harrison
- Preceded by: Seat established by 26 Stat. 826
- Succeeded by: Seat abolished

Personal details
- Born: William LeBaron Putnam; May 26, 1835 Bath, Maine
- Died: February 5, 1918 (aged 82) Portland, Maine
- Education: Bowdoin College (AB) read law

William LeBaron Putnam (May 26, 1835 – February 5, 1918) was an American lawyer and politician in Maine. Putnam served as Mayor of Portland from 1869 to 1870 and later served as a United States circuit judge of the United States Court of Appeals for the First Circuit and of the United States Circuit Courts for the First Circuit.

== Education and career ==
Born in Bath, Maine, in 1855 Putnam received an Artium Baccalaureus degree from Bowdoin College, where he was a member of the Peucinian Society. He read law in 1858 to be admitted to the Maine Bar. He worked as a lawyer in private practice in Portland, Maine, from 1858 to 1891. Putnam served as a city council member in Portland from 1860 to 1861, a member of the board of aldermen in 1862, and as Mayor of Portland from 1869 to 1870. He was a commissioner to negotiate American fishing rights in Canada from 1887 to 1888. He was the Democratic nominee for Governor in 1888, losing to Republican Edwin C. Burleigh.

== Federal judicial service ==
Putnam was nominated by President Benjamin Harrison on December 16, 1891, to the United States Court of Appeals for the First Circuit and the United States Circuit Courts for the First Circuit, to a new joint seat authorized by 26 Stat. 826. He was confirmed by the United States Senate on March 17, 1892, and received his commission the same day. On December 31, 1911, the Circuit Courts were abolished and he thereafter served only on the Court of Appeals. His service terminated on September 17, 1917, due to his retirement.

== Death ==
Putnam died on February 5, 1918, at his home on State Street in Portland. He had been incapacitated by it for over a year at the time of his death. He is buried at Evergreen Cemetery.

== Sources ==
Legal offices
Preceded by Seat established by 26 Stat. 826	Judge of the United States Circuit Courts for the First Circuit; 1892–1911	Succeeded by Seat abolished
Preceded by Seat established by 26 Stat. 826	Judge of the United States Court of Appeals for the First Circuit; 1892–1917	Succeeded by Charles Fletcher Johnson
