= Governor Curtis =

Governor Curtis may refer to:

- Kenneth M. Curtis (born 1931), 68th Governor of Maine
- Oakley C. Curtis (1865–1924), 50th Governor of Maine
