= Governor Haines =

Governor Haines may refer to:

- Daniel Haines (1801–1877), Governor of New Jersey
- John M. Haines (1863–1917), Governor of Idaho
- William T. Haines (1854–1919), Governor of Maine
