= 1922 United States Senate election in Maine =

- September 11, 1922
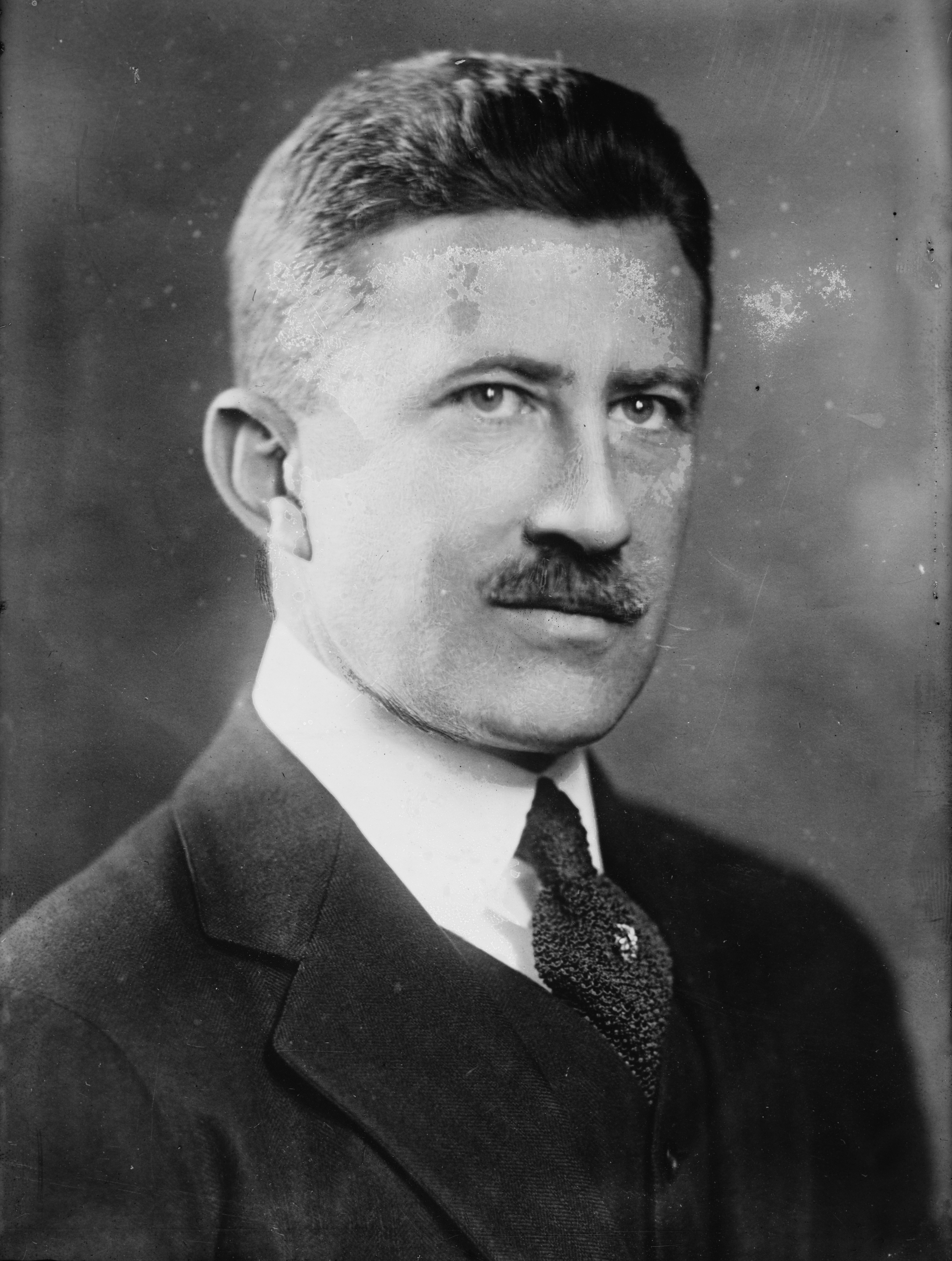

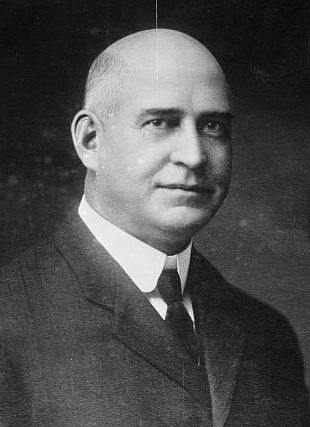
Nominee	Frederick Hale	Oakley Curtis
Party	Republican	Democratic
Popular vote	101,026	74,660
Percentage	57.50%	42.50%
- County results Hale: 50–60% 60–70% 70–80% Curtis: 50–60%
U.S. senator before election
Frederick Hale
Republican
Elected U.S. Senator
Frederick Hale
Republican

The 1922 United States Senate election in Maine was held on September 11, 1922, to elect a United States senator from Maine. Incumbent Senator Frederick Hale was re-elected to a second term.

Incumbent Republican Senator Frederick Hale was re-elected to a second term in office, defeating Democratic former Governor Oakley Curtis.

== Republican primary ==
=== Candidates ===
- Howard Davies
- Frank E. Guernsey, U.S. Representative from Dover-Foxcroft
- Frederick Hale, incumbent Senator since 1917

=== Results ===
1922 Republican U.S. Senate primary
Party	Candidate	Votes	%
Republican	Frederick Hale (incumbent)	40,151	59.83%
Republican	Frank E. Guernsey	18,937	28.22%
Republican	Howard Davies	8,039	11.95%
Total votes		67,107	100.00%

== Democratic primary ==
=== Candidates ===
- Oakley C. Curtis, former Governor of Maine (1915–17)

=== Results ===
Curtis was unopposed in the Democratic primary.

1922 Democratic U.S. Senate primary
Party	Candidate	Votes	%
Democratic	Oakley C. Curtis	9,004	100.00%
Total votes		9,004	100.00%

== General election ==
=== Results ===
1922 U.S. Senate election in Maine
Party	Candidate	Votes	%	±%
Republican	Frederick Hale (incumbent)	101,026	57.50%	▲4.78
Democratic	Oakley C. Curtis	74,660	42.50%	▼3.59
Total votes		175,686	100.00%	

== See also ==
- 1922 United States Senate elections
