= 1910 Maine gubernatorial election =

- September 12, 1910
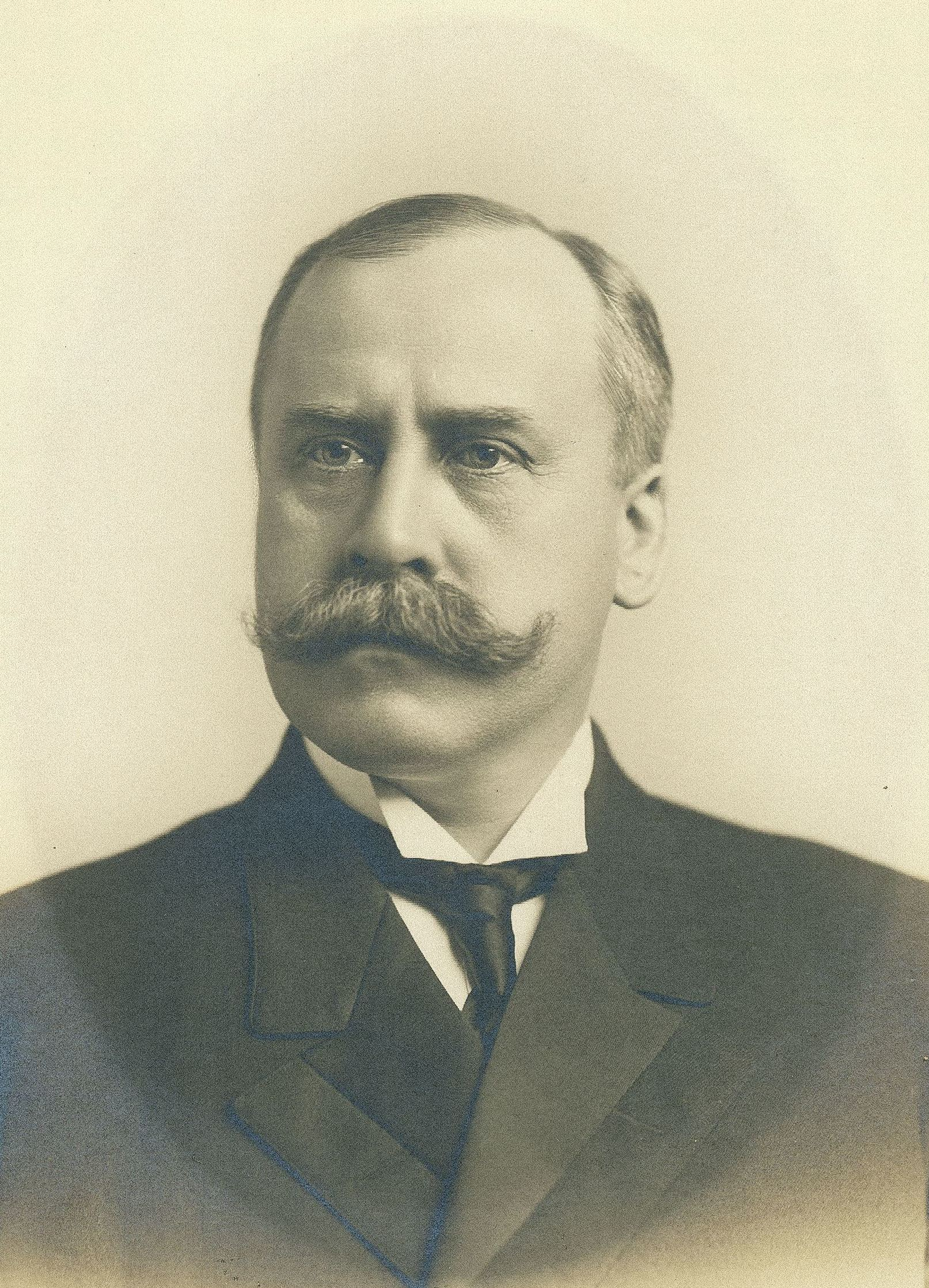

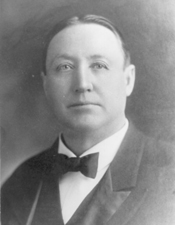
Nominee	Frederick W. Plaisted	Bert M. Fernald
Party	Democratic	Republican
Popular vote	73,304	64,644
Percentage	52.01%	45.86%
- County results Plaisted: 50–60% Fernald: 40–50% 50–60%
Governor before election
Bert M. Fernald
Republican
Elected Governor
Frederick W. Plaisted
Democratic

The 1910 Maine gubernatorial election took place on September 12, 1910.

Incumbent Republican Governor Bert M. Fernald was defeated for re-election by Democratic candidate Frederick W. Plaisted.

Plaisted was the first Democrat elected Governor of Maine since his father, Harris M. Plaisted, who won election as a Greenback-Democrat fusion candidate in 1880. This election was also the first time since 1850 that the Democratic candidate won over 50% of the vote; a feat that wouldn't be repeated until the election of 1932. In other words, of the 54 gubernatorial elections from 1850 until 1932, this was the only time the Democratic candidate received at least 50% of the vote.

== Results ==
1910 Maine gubernatorial election (Note: The Maine Senate Journal gives Plaisted's vote as 73,354, and scattering votes as 67.)
Party	Candidate	Votes	%	±%
Democratic	Frederick W. Plaisted	73,304	52.01%	
Republican	Bert M. Fernald (incumbent)	64,644	45.86%	
Socialist	Robert V. Hunter	1,641	1.16%	
Prohibition	James H. Ames	1,296	0.92%	
Scattering		63	0.05%	
Majority		8,660	6.15%	
Turnout		140,948	100.00%	
Democratic gain from Republican		Swing		
