= 1916 Maine gubernatorial election =

- September 11, 1916
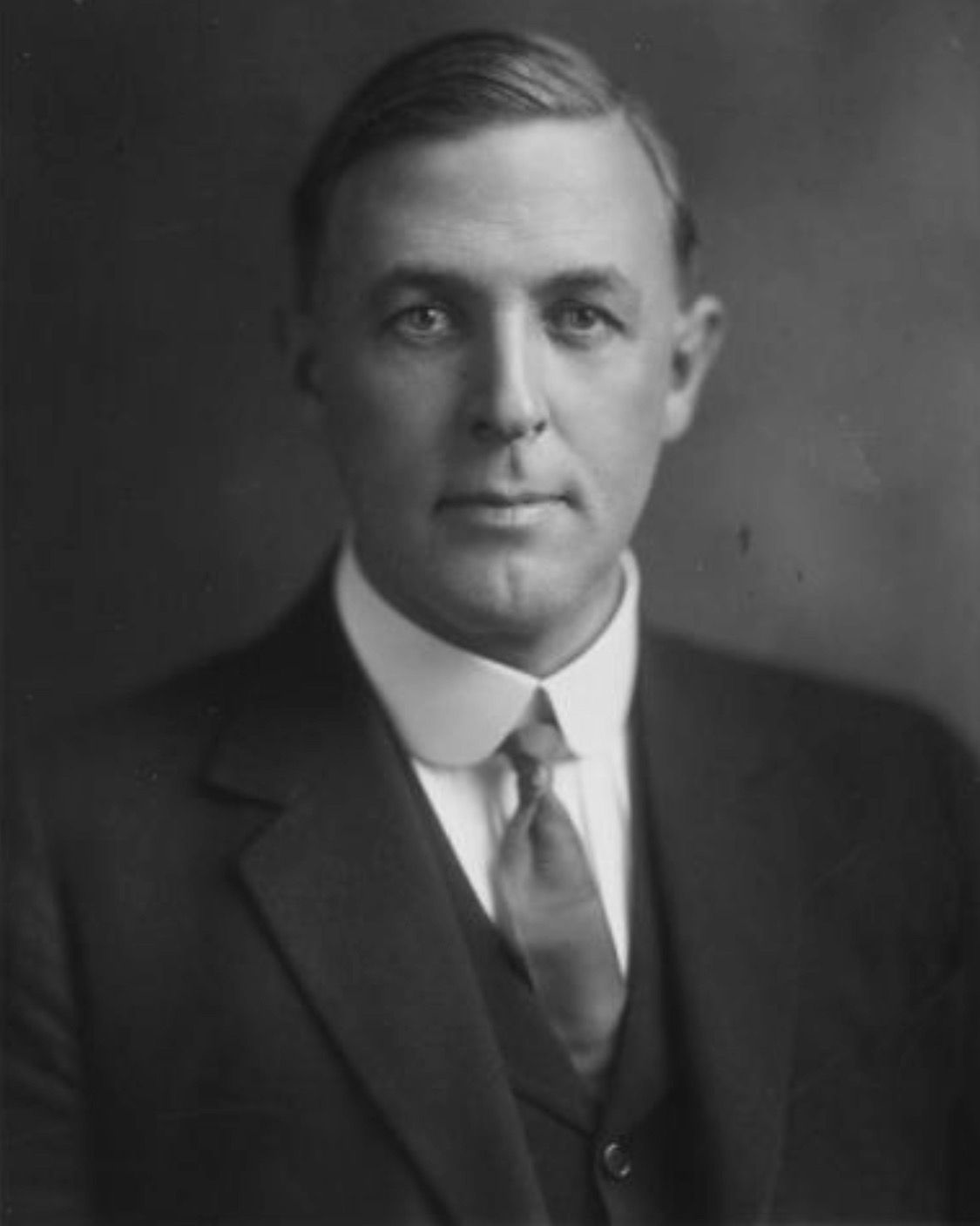

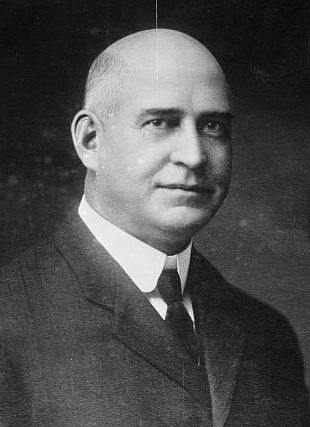
Nominee	Carl Milliken	Oakley C. Curtis
Party	Republican	Democratic
Popular vote	81,760	67,930
Percentage	54.00%	44.86%
- County results Milliken: 50–60% 60–70% Curtis: 50–60%
Governor before election
Oakley C. Curtis
Democratic
Elected Governor
Carl Milliken
Republican

The 1916 Maine gubernatorial election took place on September 11, 1916.

Incumbent Democratic Governor Oakley C. Curtis was defeated for re-election by Republican candidate Carl Milliken.

== Results ==
1916 Maine gubernatorial election (Note: The Maine House Journal and Maine Senate Journal record the result as Milliken 81,317, Curtis 67,719, Maxfield 1,558, Seeley 249.)
Party	Candidate	Votes	%	±%
Republican	Carl Milliken	81,760	54.00%	
Democratic	Oakley C. Curtis (incumbent)	67,930	44.86%	
Socialist	Frank H. Maxfield	1,465	0.97%	
Prohibition	Linus Seeley	253	0.17%	
Scattering		2	0.00%	
Majority		13,830	9.13%	
Turnout		151,410	100.00%	
Republican gain from Democratic		Swing		
