= Charles A. Strout =

American lawyer (1863–1935)

Charles A. Strout (July 12, 1863 - December 1, 1935) was an American lawyer and politician who served one term as mayor of Portland, Maine (1910).

Strout was born in Portland in 1863 to Sewall C. Strout and Octavia Shaw Strout. His father was a justice on the Maine Supreme Judicial Court from 1894 to 1908. After graduating from Portland schools, he enrolled at Bowdoin College. However, his eye was injured in a hazing accident and he was forced to drop out. He read law in his father's law office, Strout, Gage, and Strout before being admitted to the Maine bar in April 1885.

In 1887, he was one of the founding officers of the Young Men's Republican Club of Portland. Other officers included architect John Calvin Stevens and fellow future mayor Wilford G. Chapman.

Strout was active in city government and was elected to multiple terms in various roles. In 1890 and 1891, he was elected to the Portland Common Council; in his second term, he was chosen council president. In 1893, he was elected alderman from Ward Six, serving one term. In 1900, he was elected city solicitor, a position he held for three terms.

In December 1909, Strout, as the Republican nominee, was elected mayor of Portland over banker and Democratic nominee Oakley C. Curtis. He replaced Adam P. Leighton who had not sought re-election. A year later, Strout was defeated by Curtis in what the Portland Sunday Telegram described as "The Quietest Municipal Campaign In Years."

Strout was a member of many fraternal organizations and clubs, including the Knights of Pythias, Benevolent and Protective Order of Elks, and the Cumberland Club.

Strout died unexpectedly by heart attack at the Lafayette Hotel on December 1, 1935 at the age of 72. His funeral was held at the Wilde Memorial Chapel before being buried at Evergreen Cemetery.
