= 1928 United States Senate election in Maine =

- September 10, 1928
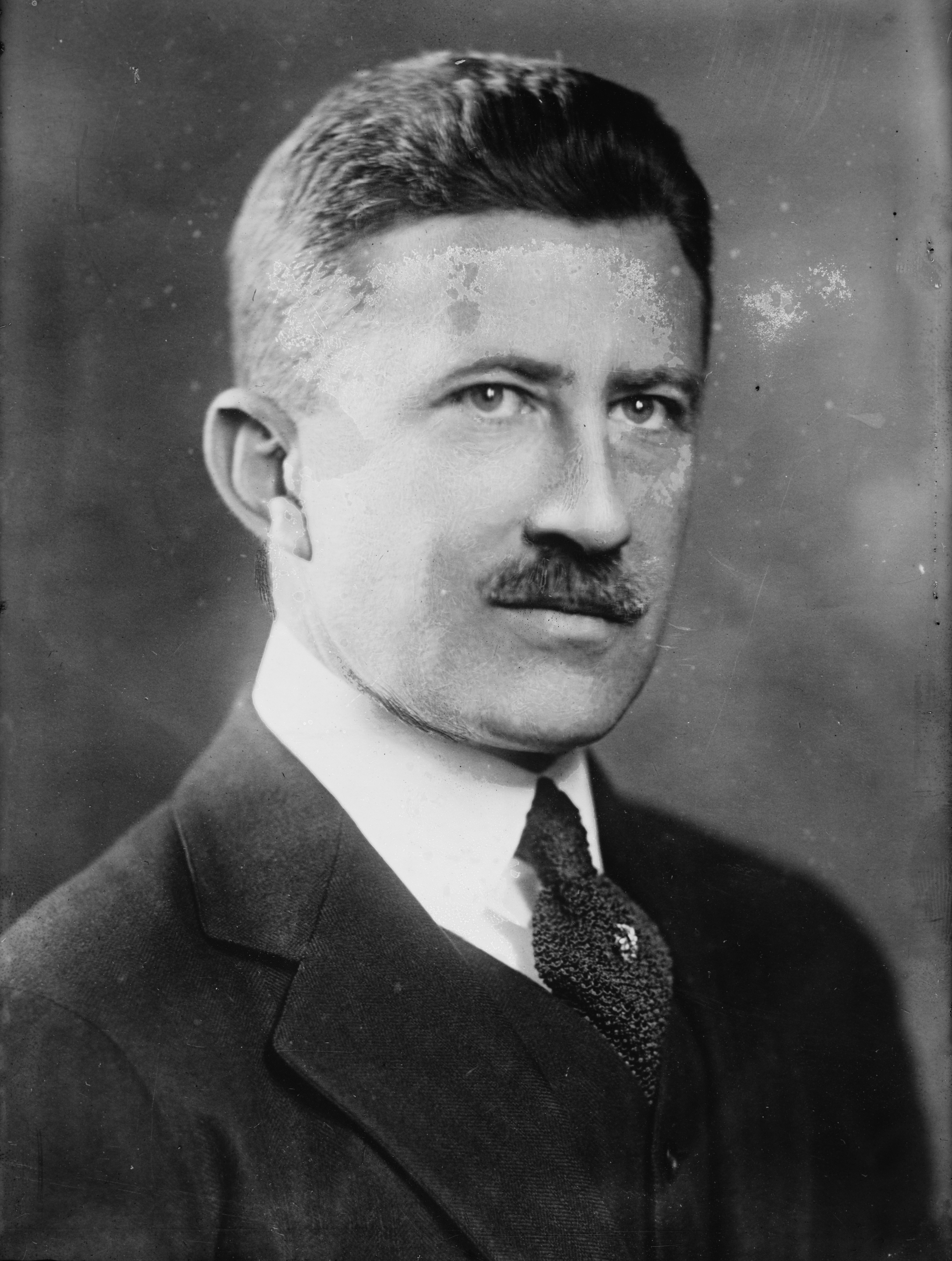

Nominee	Frederick Hale	Herbert E. Holmes
Party	Republican	Democratic
Popular vote	145,501	63,429
Percentage	69.64%	30.36%
- County results Hale: 50–60% 60–70% 70–80%
U.S. senator before election
Frederick Hale
Republican
Elected U.S. Senator
Frederick Hale
Republican

The 1928 United States Senate election in Maine was held on September 10, 1928.

Incumbent Republican Senator Frederick Hale was re-elected to a third term in office, defeating Governor Owen Brewster in the primary. Hale won the general election in a landslide.

== Republican primary ==
=== Candidates ===
- Frederick Hale, incumbent Senator since 1917
- Owen Brewster, Governor of Maine

=== Results ===
1928 Republican U.S. Senate primary
Party	Candidate	Votes	%
Republican	Frederick Hale (incumbent)	77,830	63.61%
Republican	Owen Brewster	44,524	36.39%
Total votes		122,354	100.00%

== Democratic primary ==
=== Candidates ===
- Herbert E. Holmes

=== Results ===
Holmes was unopposed in the Democratic primary.

1928 Democratic U.S. Senate primary
Party	Candidate	Votes	%
Democratic	Herbert E. Holmes	8,927	99.32%
Write-in		61	0.68%
Total votes		8,988	100.00%

== General election ==
=== Results ===
1928 U.S. Senate election in Maine
Party	Candidate	Votes	%	±%
Republican	Frederick Hale (incumbent)	145,501	69.64%	▲12.14
Democratic	Herbert E. Holmes	63,429	30.36%	▼12.14
Total votes		208,930	100.00%	

== See also ==
- 1928 United States Senate elections
