= Charles Thornton Libby =

American genealogist, historian and lawyer (1861–1948)

- Libby in the late 19th century
- Born: September 28, 1861; Scarborough, Maine, U.S.
- Died: May 23, 1948 (aged 86); Yarmouth, Maine, U.S.
- Resting place: Evergreen Cemetery, Portland, Maine, U.S.
- Occupations: Author, genealogist, historian, lawyer
- Spouse: Anna Reed Libby (m. 1899)

Signature
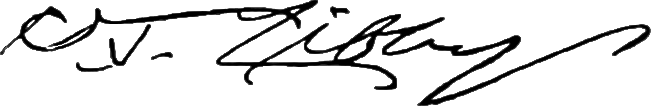

Charles Thornton Libby (September 28, 1861 – May 23, 1948) was an American author, genealogist, historian and lawyer. He wrote five known books: The Libby Family in America, 1602–1881 (1882), Cash, Panics and Industrial Depressions (1907), The Income Tax Amendment (1907) and Province and Court Records of Maine and Genealogical Dictionary of Maine and New Hampshire, Part I (1928).

== Life and career ==
Libby was born in 1861 in Scarborough, Maine, to Matthias Libby and Eliza Gookin Thornton. He is believed to have been their first child, followed five years later by a sister, Cornelia Maynard. His mother died when he was 15.

He graduated high school in July 1879, shortly after which he called at the law offices of Charles Freeman Libby, then unknown to him, about a possible position. To his surprise, at 17 years of age, was hired.

Libby was admitted to Harvard College, but his entrance was delayed due to his writing The Libby Family in America, 1602–1881, which was published in 1882. He graduated Harvard College in 1885.

In July 1881, he was admitted into the Second Congregational Church of Portland.

He was admitted to the Cumberland County Bar in April 1888, and the following year was one of the original incorporators of the Maine Title Insurance Company.

Between 1892 and 1916, he was the editor of the Six Towns Times, a weekly newspaper in southern Maine. During its run, Libby was described by the Maine Press Association as being "a most industrious, enterprising and persevering man."

In 1899, Libby married Annie Reed.

In August 1921, by which time he was living in North Yarmouth, Maine, he was elected president of the Society of Piscataqua Engineers, incorporated in 1905.

== Frederick Hale incident ==
In May 1910, Libby was attacked with a whip by colonel Frederick Hale (later of the Maine Senate) following an article about Hale's mother that was published in the Six Towns Times. Hale had entered Libby's office in Portland, holding a copy of the newspaper, and asked, "Are you responsible for this?" Libby looked at it and replied in the affirmative. Hale pulled a whip out from under his coat and struck Libby several times, saying, "Take that, you cur." Hale then threw the whip on the office floor and struck Libby. "This is what I do to anyone who insults my mother." After Hale left, Libby said: "I like him better than I did before. It was a manly thing to do. A man who wouldn't stand up for his mother don't amount to much."

== Death ==
Libby died at his home in Yarmouth, Maine, in 1948, aged 86. He is interred in Portland's Evergreen Cemetery, alongside his wife, who survived him by seven years.

He was posthumously awarded an honorary Master of Arts degree by Bowdoin College.

== Bibliography ==
- The Libby Family in America, 1602–1881 (1882)
- Cash, Panics and Industrial Depressions (1907)
- The Income Tax Amendment (1907)
- Province and Court Records of Maine
- Genealogical Dictionary of Maine and New Hampshire, Part I (1928)
