= 1912 Maine gubernatorial election =

- September 9, 1912
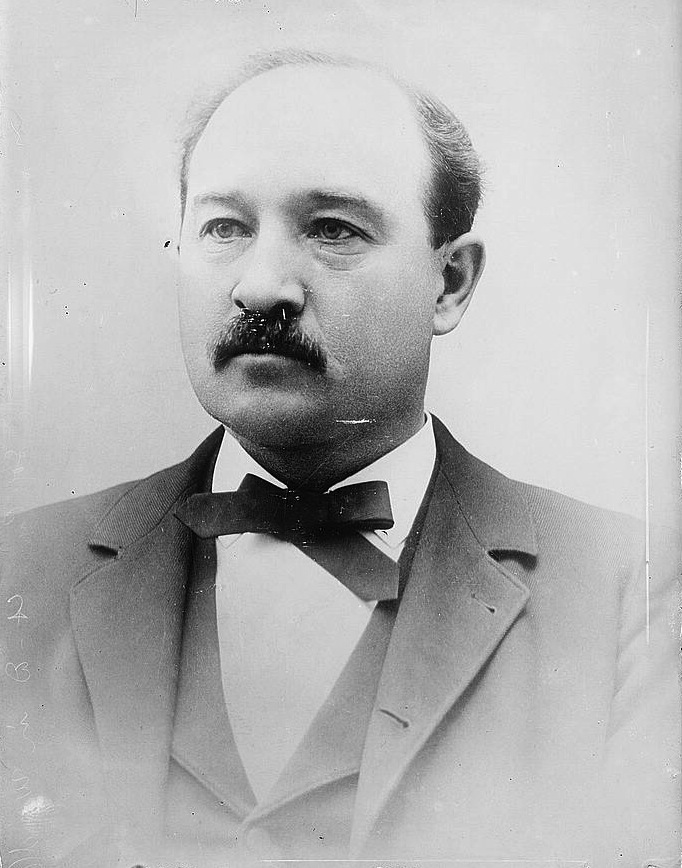

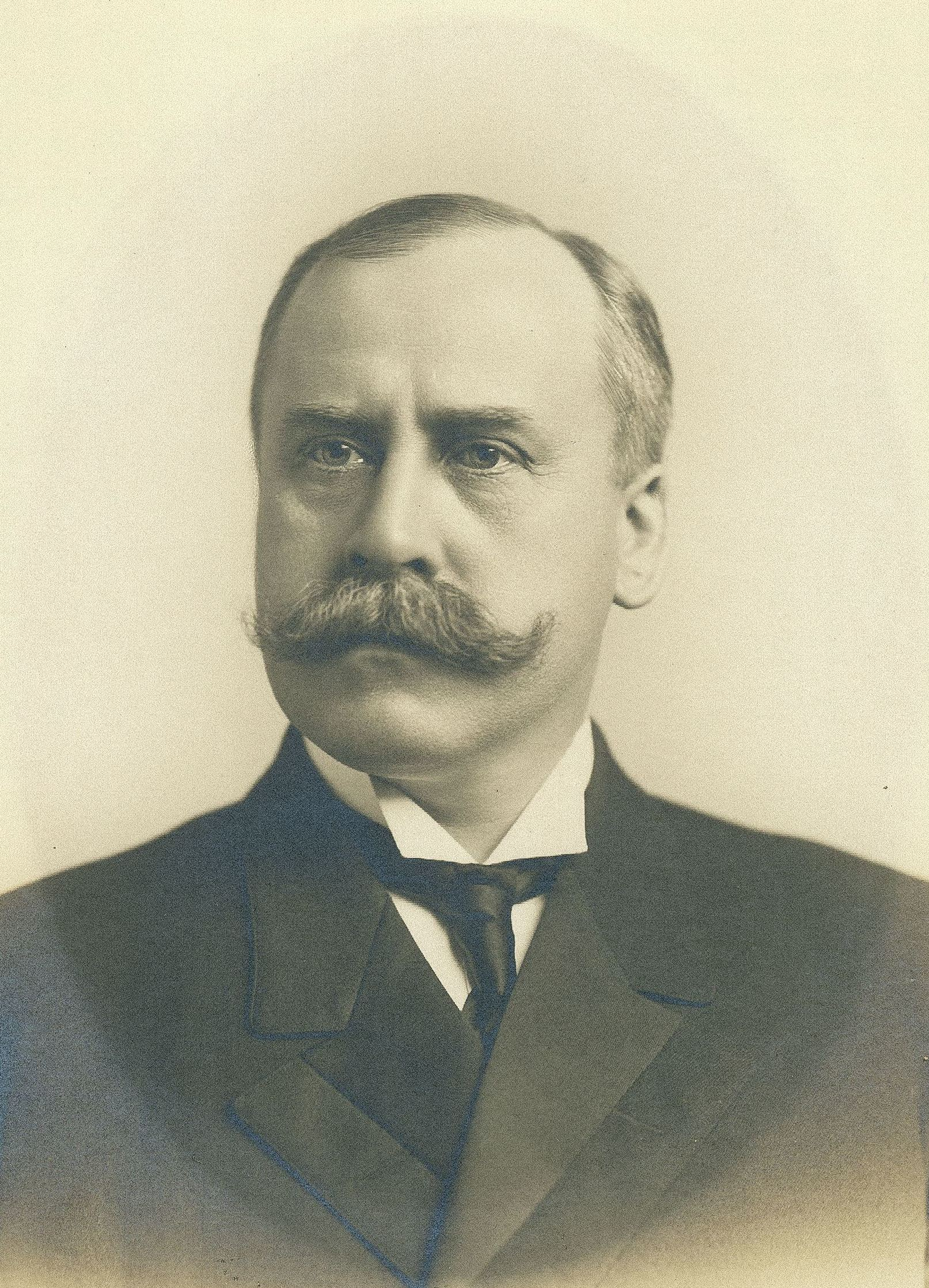
Nominee	William T. Haines	Frederick W. Plaisted
Party	Republican	Democratic
Popular vote	70,931	67,702
Percentage	49.97%	47.70%
- County results Haines: 40–50% 50–60% 60–70% Plaisted: 40–50% 50–60%
Governor before election
Frederick W. Plaisted
Democratic
Elected Governor
William T. Haines
Republican

The 1912 Maine gubernatorial election took place on September 9, 1912.

Incumbent Democratic Governor Frederick W. Plaisted was defeated for re-election by Republican candidate William T. Haines.

== Results ==
1912 Maine gubernatorial election (Note: The Maine Senate Journal records Plaisted's vote as 67,602.)
Party	Candidate	Votes	%	±%
Republican	William T. Haines	70,931	49.97%	
Democratic	Frederick W. Plaisted (incumbent)	67,702	47.70%	
Socialist	George Allan England	2,081	1.47%	
Prohibition	William I. Sterling	1,217	0.86%	
Scattering		9	0.01%	
Majority		3,229	2.27%	
Turnout		141,940	100.00%	
Republican gain from Democratic		Swing		
