= United States Senate Committee on Canadian Relations =

The United States Senate Committee on Canadian Relations existed from July 31, 1888, when it was created as a select committee, until April 18, 1921, and dealt with issues related to U.S. relations with Canada. It became a standing committee on January 13, 1892.

== Chairs of the Select Committee on Canadian Relations, 1888–1892 ==
Chair	Party	State	Years
George F. Hoar	Republican	Massachusetts	1888-1892

== Chairs of the Committee on Canadian Relations, 1892–1921 ==
Chair	Party	State	Years
John B. Allen	Republican	Washington	1892-1893
Edward Murphy	Democratic	New York	1893-1895
Thomas Carter	Republican	Montana	1895-1897
John C. Spooner	Republican	Wisconsin	1897-1899
Marcus A. Hanna	Republican	Ohio	1899-1901
John F. Dryden	Republican	New Jersey	1901-1903
Charles W. Fulton	Republican	Oregon	1903-1905
W. Murray Crane	Republican	Massachusetts	1905-1909
William Alden Smith	Republican	Michigan	1909-1911
George T. Oliver	Republican	Pennsylvania	1911-1913
John K. Shields	Democratic	Tennessee	1913-1917
John B. Kendrick	Democratic	Wyoming	1917-1919
Frederick Hale	Republican	Maine	1919-1921

== Sources ==
Chairmen of Senate Standing Committees U.S. Senate Historical Office, January 2005.
