= 1908 Maine gubernatorial election =

- September 14, 1908
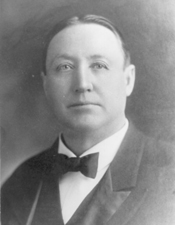

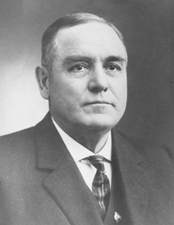
| Nominee | Bert M. Fernald | Obadiah Gardner |
| Party | Republican | Democratic |
| Popular vote | 73,551 | 66,278 |
| Percentage | 51.55% | 46.46% |
- County results Fernald: 40–50% 50–60% 60–70% Gardner: 50–60%
Governor before election
William T. Cobb
Republican
Elected Governor
Bert M. Fernald
Democratic

The 1908 Maine gubernatorial election took place on September 14, 1908.

Incumbent Governor William T. Cobb did not seek re-election. Republican candidate Bert M. Fernald defeated Democratic candidate Obadiah Gardner.

== Results ==
1908 Maine gubernatorial election (Note: The Maine Senate Journal records the result as Fernald 73,239, Gardner 66,237, Perry 1,678, Ames 1,117.)
| Party | Candidate | Votes | % | ±% |
|---|---|---|---|---|
| Republican | Bert M. Fernald | 73,551 | 51.55% | |
| Democratic | Obadiah Gardner | 66,278 | 46.46% | |
| Prohibition | James H. Ames | 1,421 | 1.00% | |
| Socialist | Curtis A. Perry | 1,416 | 0.99% | |
| Majority | | 7,273 | 5.09% | |
| Turnout | | 142,666 | 100.00% | |
| Republican hold | | Swing | | |
