= Seth L. Milliken =

American politician

Seth Llewellyn Milliken
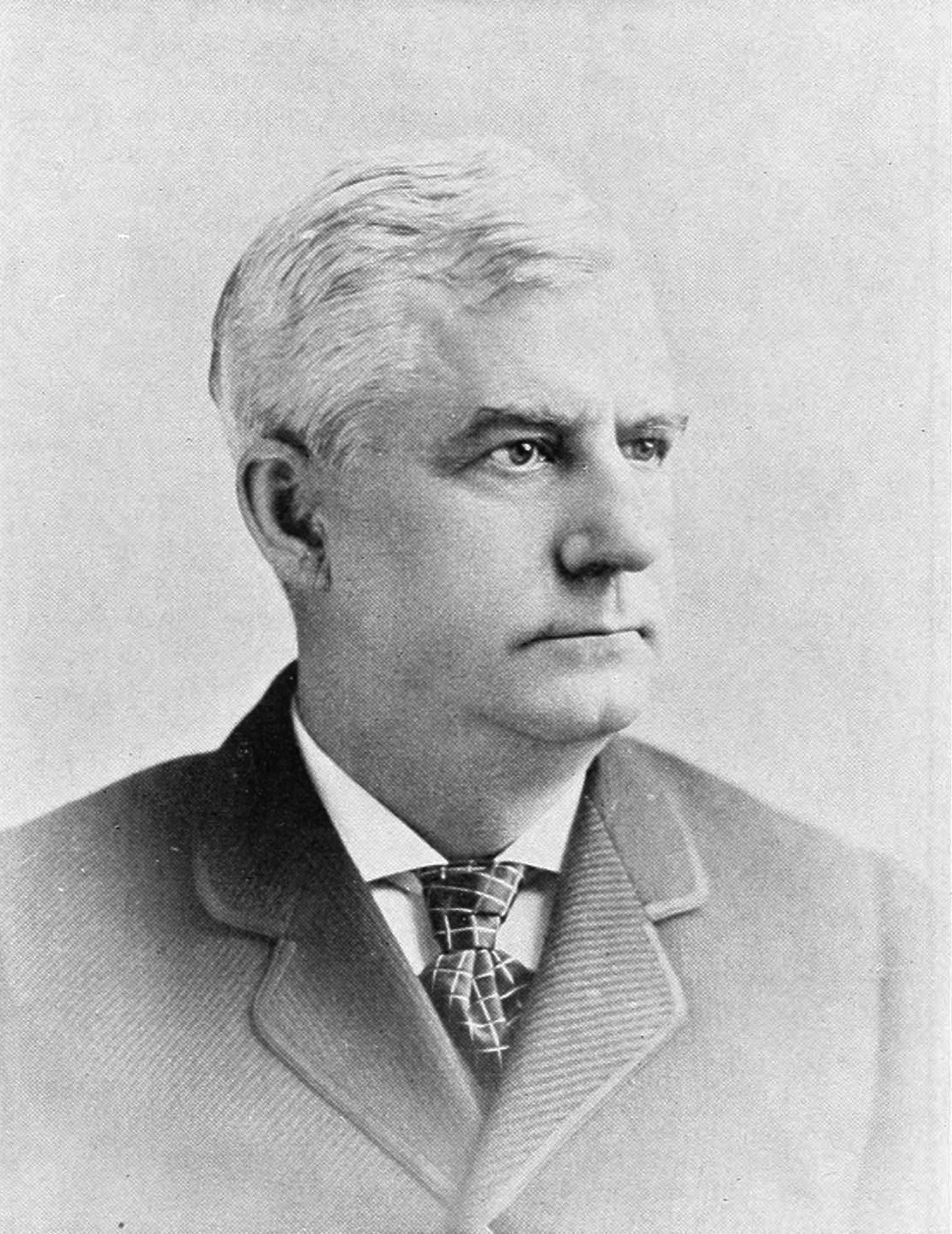

Member of U.S. House of Representatives from Maine's 3rd district
- In office March 4, 1883 – April 18, 1897
- Preceded by: Stephen Decatur Lindsey
- Succeeded by: Edwin C. Burleigh

Member of Maine House of Representatives Camden
- In office 1857–1858

Personal details
- Born: December 12, 1831 Montville, Maine
- Died: April 18, 1897 (aged 65) Washington, D.C.
- Resting place: Grove Cemetery, Belfast, Maine
- Party: Republican
- Education: Colby College; Union College

Seth Llewellyn Milliken (December 12, 1831 – April 18, 1897) was a U.S. representative from Maine.

== Early life ==
Born in Montville, Maine, the son of William Milliken and Lucy P. Perrigo. Milliken attended the common schools and Waterville College (now Colby College) before graduating from Union College, Schenectady, New York, in 1856.

== Family life ==
Milliken had two children, a daughter Maud Milliken and a son Seth M. Milliken.

== Career ==
Milliken served as member of the Maine House of Representatives in 1857 and 1858. Milliken moved to Belfast, Maine. He served as clerk of the Supreme Judicial Court from 1859 to 1871. He studied law and was admitted to the bar in 1871, but did not practice. He served as delegate to the Republican National Convention in 1876 and 1884.

Milliken was elected as a Republican to the Forty-eighth and to the seven succeeding Congresses and served from March 4, 1883, until his death in Washington, D.C., April 18, 1897. He served as chairman of the Committee on Public Buildings and Grounds (Fifty-first and Fifty-fourth Congresses). He was interred in Grove Cemetery, Belfast, Maine.

== See also ==
- List of members of the United States Congress who died in office (1790–1899)

U.S. House of Representatives
Preceded by Stephen Decatur Lindsey	Member of the U.S. House of Representatives from Maine's 3rd congressional district March 4, 1883 – April 18, 1897	Succeeded by Edwin C. Burleigh
