= 1918 Maine gubernatorial election =

- September 9, 1918
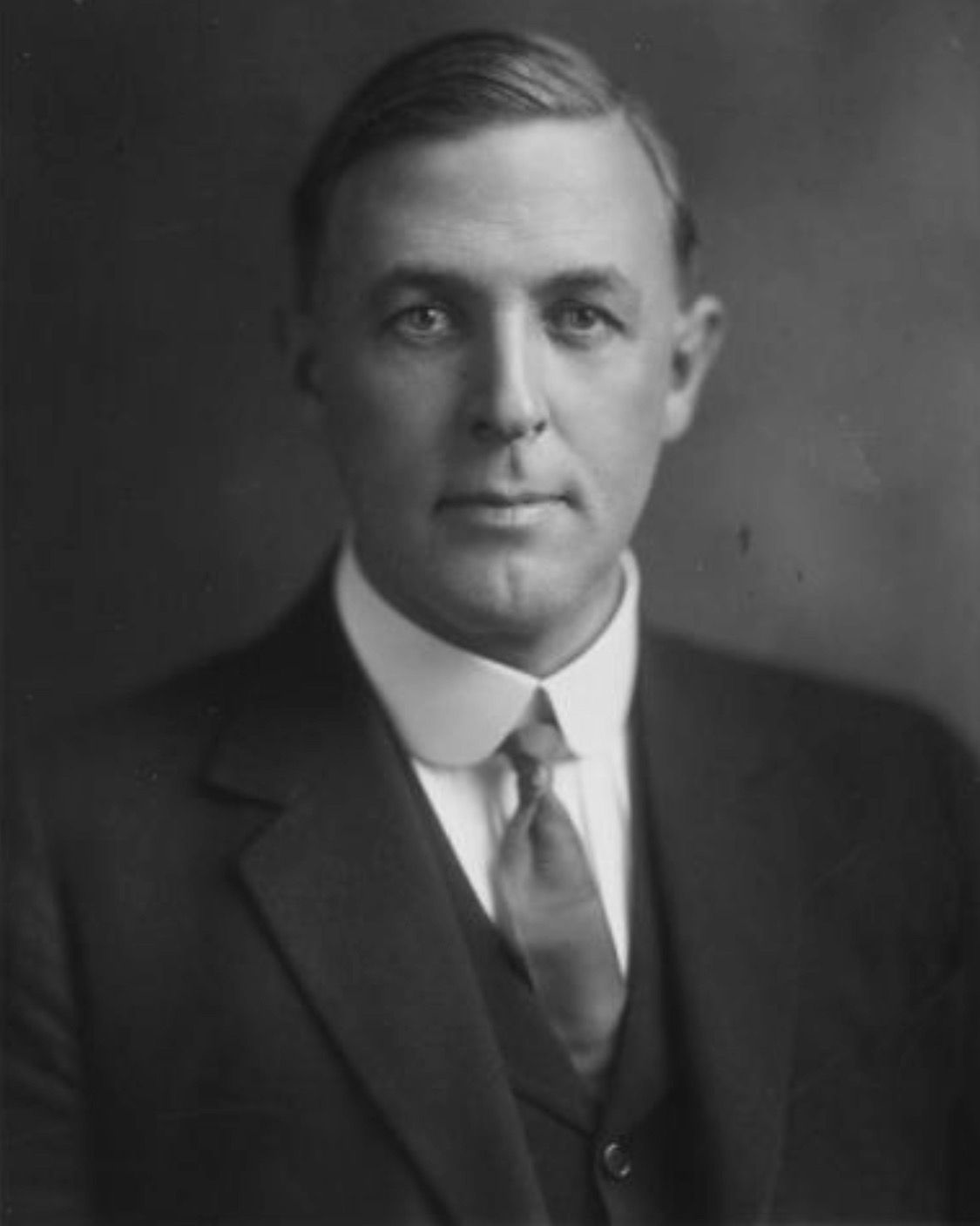

| Nominee | Carl Milliken | Bertrand G. McIntire |
| Party | Republican | Democratic |
| Popular vote | 64,069 | 59,050 |
| Percentage | 52.04% | 47.96% |
- County results Milliken: 50–60% 60–70% McIntre: 50–60%
Governor before election
Carl Milliken
Republican
Elected Governor
Carl Milliken
Republican

The 1918 Maine gubernatorial election took place on September 9, 1918.

Incumbent Republican Governor Carl Milliken was elected to a second term in office, defeating Democratic candidate Bertrand G. McIntire.

== Results ==
1918 Maine gubernatorial election (Note: The Maine House Journal and Maine Senate Journal record the result as Milliken 64,027, McIntire 58,994.)
| Party | Candidate | Votes | % | ±% |
|---|---|---|---|---|
| Republican | Carl Milliken (incumbent) | 64,069 | 52.04% | |
| Democratic | Bertrand G. McIntire | 59,050 | 47.96% | |
| Majority | | 5,019 | 4.08% | |
| Turnout | | 123,119 | 100.00% | |
| Republican hold | | Swing | | |
