= Frederick Robie =

American politician

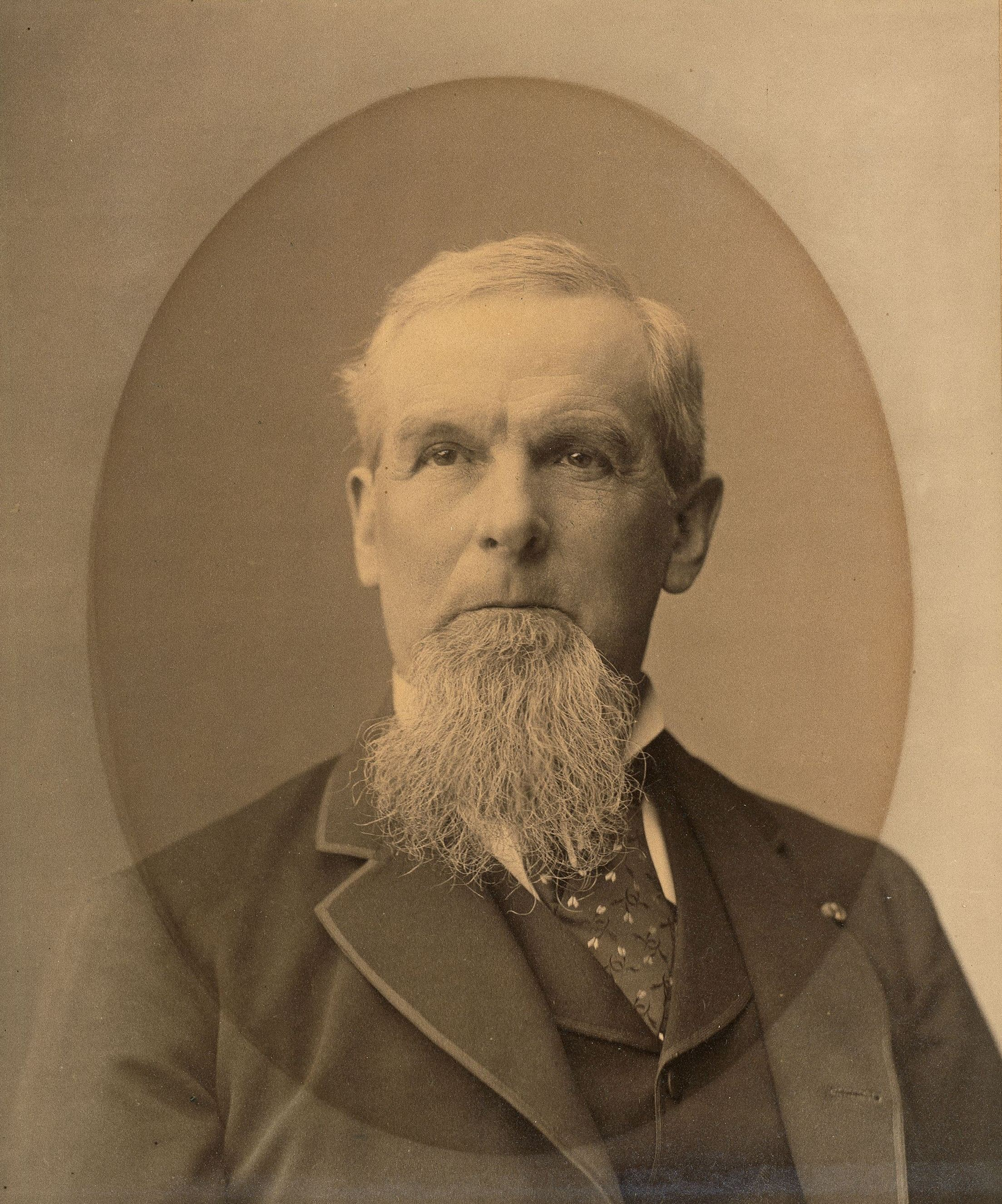

39th Governor of Maine
- In office January 3, 1883 – January 5, 1887
- Preceded by: Harris M. Plaisted
- Succeeded by: Joseph R. Bodwell

Member of the Maine Senate
- In office 1866–1867

Member of the Maine House of Representatives
- In office 1859–1861

Personal details
- Born: August 12, 1822 Gorham, Maine, U.S.
- Died: February 2, 1912 (aged 89) Gorham, Maine, U.S.
- Party: Republican
- Relations: Frederick Robie (grandson)
- Education: Bowdoin College
- Profession: Physician

Frederick Robie (August 12, 1822 – February 2, 1912) was an American physician and politician who served as the 39th governor of Maine.

== Early life ==
Robie was born in Gorham, Maine, and studied at the Gorham Academy. He graduated from Bowdoin College in 1841. After graduation, he taught at academies in the Southern states and served as a tutor to the family of Dennis DuPont Hankins, a plantation owner in the Territory of Florida. He then took a medical course at Jefferson Medical College, Philadelphia, and received his medical degree in 1844. He had a successful medical career and established medical practices in Biddeford, and Waldoboro, Maine. He later practiced medicine in his hometown of Gorham.

== Civil War ==
During the American Civil War, Robie accepted an appointment from President Abraham Lincoln as Paymaster of United States Volunteers. He served with the Army of the Potomac from 1861 to 1863. Robie then was transferred to Boston as Chief Paymaster of the Department of New England. He later served in Maine administering the final payments of discharged soldiers.

== Politics ==
Robie was elected to the Maine House of Representatives in 1859. Re-elected in 1860, he left office to serve in the Union Army. At the end of the war, Robie was elected to the Maine Senate in 1866 and 1867. He was Speaker of the Maine House of Representatives in 1872 and 1876. He served as a member of the Executive Council of Maine in 1880 and from 1881 to 1882. In 1882 he was the Republican nominee for Governor and was elected by a popular vote. He was re-elected in 1884 by nearly 20,000 votes. He left office on January 5, 1887.

== Later years ==
After leaving office, Robie continued his medical practice. He also served on the boards of directors of the First National Bank of Portland and the Portland and Rochester Railroad Company. He died at his home in Gorham in on February 2, 1912.

Party political offices
Preceded by Daniel F. Davis	Republican nominee for Governor of Maine; 1882, 1884	Succeeded by Joseph R. Bodwell
Political offices
Preceded by Harris M. Plaisted	Governor of Maine; 1883–1887	Succeeded by Joseph R. Bodwell
