= Carl Milliken =

American politician, 51st Governor of Maine (1877–1961)

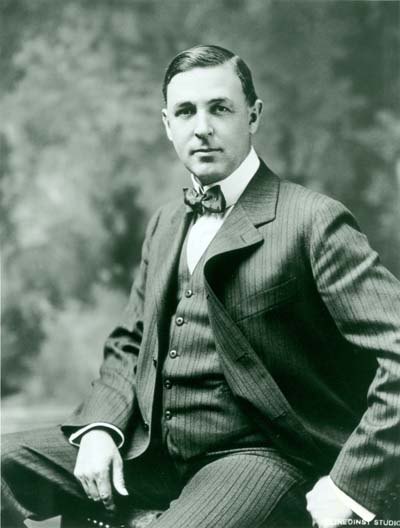

51st Governor of Maine
- In office January 3, 1917 – January 5, 1921
- Preceded by: Oakley C. Curtis
- Succeeded by: Frederic H. Parkhurst

73rd President of the Maine Senate
- In office January 2, 1913 – January 5, 1915
- Preceded by: Nathan Clifford
- Succeeded by: Ira G. Hersey

Member of the Maine Senate from the 16th district
- In office January 6, 1909 – January 5, 1915
- Preceded by: Beecher Putnam
- Succeeded by: Aaron J. Fulton
- Constituency: Aroostook County

Member of the Maine House of Representatives
- In office January 4, 1905 – January 6, 1909
- Preceded by: Harrison G. White
- Succeeded by: Verdi Ludgate

Personal details
- Born: July 13, 1877 Pittsfield, Maine, U.S.
- Died: May 1, 1961 (aged 83) Springfield, Massachusetts, U.S.
- Party: Progressive; Republican
- Spouses: Emma Chase (died 1930); Caroline Chase
- Education: Bates College; Harvard University

Carl Elias Milliken (July 13, 1877 – May 1, 1961) was an American politician, and business executive. He served as the 51st governor of Maine from 1917 to 1921, coinciding with United States direct involvement in World War I. He was later the chief spokesman for the Motion Picture Association of America (MPAA).

== Early life and education ==
A native of Pittsfield, Maine, Milliken was the son of Charles Arthur Milliken and Phoebe Ellen Knowlton. Milliken graduated from Bates College in 1897. He went on to receive his master's degree from Harvard University in 1899, before moving to Island Falls, Maine, to enter the lumber business.

== Early business career ==
During the next six years, Milliken held positions as general manager of two lumber companies and an axe manufacturer and as president of a local telephone company.

== Political career ==
His political career began in 1905, when he was elected to the Maine House of Representatives. Milliken moved up to the Maine State Senate in 1909, and was president of that body from 1913 to 1915.

=== As governor ===
Running for Governor of Maine as a Republican Party candidate in 1916, Milliken easily defeated the Democratic Party incumbent, Oakley C. Curtis. He was reelected in 1918, this time by a smaller margin over Bertrand McIntire. As governor, he strictly enforced state and federal alcohol prohibition laws, which he strongly supported. Milliken lost renomination to Frederic Hale Parkhurst in the 1920 Republican primary.

== Motion Picture career ==
Milliken left office on January 5, 1921. The following year, he became executive secretary and chief spokesman of the Motion Picture Producers and Distributors Association (later the Motion Picture Association of America), the movie industry's first self-censorship body. Milliken served as executive secretary for more than two decades, retiring in 1947.

== In retirement ==
After stepping down from the MPAA, Milliken served as the managing trustee of Teaching Film Custodians, a trust for educational films, and also served a term as president of the American Baptist Foreign Missionary Society.

== Personal life ==
Milliken married twice. His first wife, Emma Chase, died in 1930. He then married her sister, Caroline Chase. With his first wife, Milliken had one son and six daughters. His wives were the daughters of his alma mater's president George Colby Chase. Milliken died at a Springfield, Massachusetts nursing home in 1961 at the age of 83. He is buried at Forest Grove Cemetery in Augusta, Maine.

Party political offices
Preceded by William T. Haines	Republican nominee for Governor of Maine; 1916, 1918	Succeeded by Frederic Hale Parkhurst
Political offices
Preceded by Oakley C. Curtis	Governor of Maine; 1917–1921	Succeeded by Frederic H. Parkhurst
