= 1914 Maine gubernatorial election =

- September 14, 1914
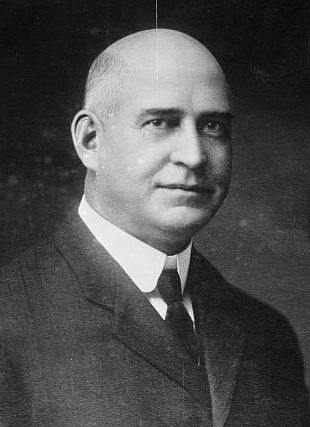

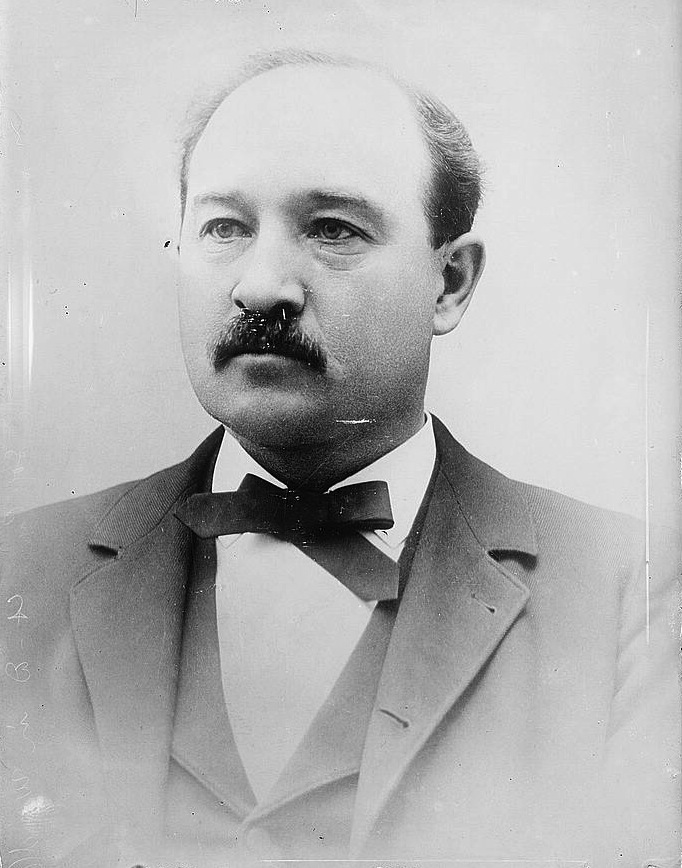

Nominee	Oakley C. Curtis	William T. Haines	Halbert P. Gardner
Party	Democratic	Republican	Progressive
Popular vote	62,076	58,887	18,226
Percentage	43.82%	41.57%	12.87%
- County results Curtis: 30–40% 40–50% 50–60% Haines: 40–50% 50–60%
Governor before election
William T. Haines
Republican
Elected Governor
Oakley C. Curtis
Democratic

The 1914 Maine gubernatorial election took place on September 14, 1914.

Incumbent Republican Governor William T. Haines was defeated for re-election by Democratic candidate Oakley C. Curtis. Progressive candidate Halbert P. Gardner took nearly 13% of the vote.

== Results ==
1914 Maine gubernatorial election (Note: The Maine House Journal and Maine Senate Journal record the result as Curtis 62,052, Haines 58,825, Gardner 18,226, Morse 1,880, Shepherd 597.)
Party	Candidate	Votes	%	±%
Democratic	Oakley C. Curtis	62,076	43.82%	
Republican	William T. Haines (incumbent)	58,887	41.57%	
Progressive	Halbert P. Gardner	18,226	12.87%	
Socialist	Percy F. Morse	1,880	1.33%	
Prohibition	Frederick A. Shepherd	597	0.42%	
Majority		3,189	2.25%	
Turnout		141,666	100.00%	
Democratic gain from Republican		Swing		
