= Department of New England =

The Department of New England was a Union Army Department created on October 1, 1861, consisting of the six New England States. The department was discontinued on February 20, 1862.

== Commanders ==
- Major General, Benjamin F. Butler, October 1, 1861 - February 20, 1862

== Posts in Department of New England ==
- Fort Adams, Rhode Island
