= Joseph R. Bodwell =

American politician

Joseph Robinson Bodwell
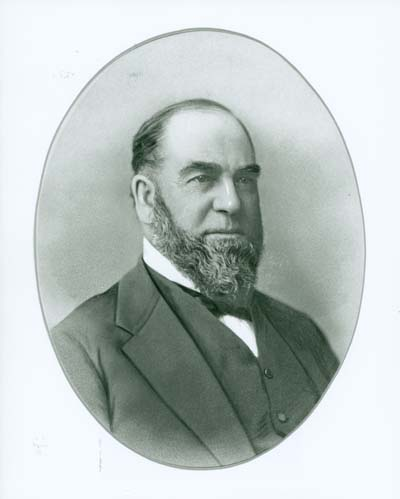

40th Governor of Maine
- In office January 5, 1887 – December 15, 1887
- Preceded by: Frederick Robie
- Succeeded by: S. S. Marble

Personal details
- Born: June 18, 1818 Methuen, Massachusetts, US
- Died: December 15, 1887 (aged 69) Hallowell, Maine, US
- Party: Republican
- Profession: Businessman

Joseph Robinson Bodwell (June 18, 1818 – December 15, 1887) was an American politician who most notably served as the 40th governor of Maine.

== Early life ==
Bodwell was born in Methuen, Massachusetts on June 18, 1818. In 1847, the area of the city in which he was born split off and formed a portion of the city of Lawrence, Massachusetts. He was the tenth of eleventh children. His father was "a man of influence" and was a director of a bridge over the Merrimack River. He spent the first years of his life living in an "old-fashioned mansion-house, similar to those erected by well-to-do New England farmers" that had been home to his family for five generations. Facing mounting debt from lawsuits and from co-signing loans for friends, the family sold the mansion and moved to a "less pretentious" home in nearby West Haverhill, Massachusetts in 1829. Bodwell's mother, Mary How, was the sister of Portland, Maine merchant Daniel How and the family was well-established in Methuen.

Bodwell lived with his parents until the age of 8 when he left his parents and moved in with his older sister on a farm approximately five miles away from the family home. A memoriam published after his death said of the move, "It was not poverty, as has frequently been stated, that caused Joseph R. Bodwell to leave the paternal roof at the age of eight years...He left home because his childless sister wanted him and needed his companionship, and he there received the full measure of a sister's affection." He lived and worked on the farm, attended local schools, and became a cordwainer. When his brother-in-law died in 1834, Bodwell's father purchased the farm from his sister. In 1848, Bodwell's elderly parents moved in with his sister, Asa, and both died before the end of the year. The farm then became the property of Joseph and his brother Henry. He married in 1848 and he and his wife lived on the farm until 1866.

Around this period, capitalists from Boston, including Abbott Lawrence, began acquiring land around Bodwell's Falls in what is now Lawrence. The brothers furnished the capitalists with materials, including wooden housing frames and eventually granite used to build the Great Stone Dam.

== Business career ==
In 1838, Bodwell and his father bought a farm in West Methuen. He and his father continued to till it together for ten years. While engaged in this work, Bodwell worked on the project to improve the Merrimack River at Lawrence. A large amount of stone was required for the project. Bodwell was employed to help haul the stone from Pelham, New Hampshire where it was quarried. He learned the stone cutting business. Bodwell eventually became the owner of two stone companies, becoming one of the largest granite producers in the United States.

Bodwell Granite Company was a large employer on the island of Vinalhaven, east of Rockland, Maine.

== Politics ==
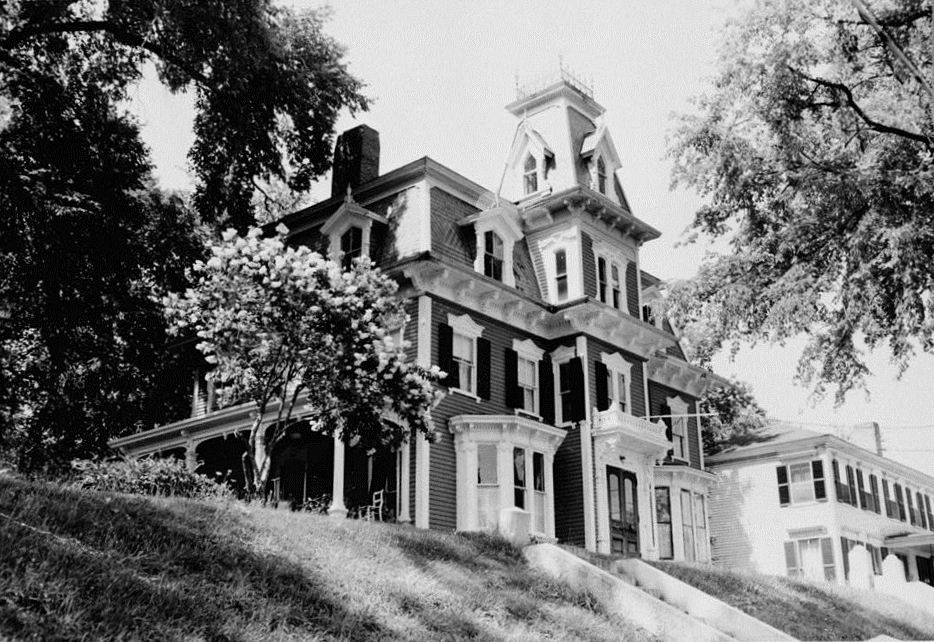
Gov. Joseph R. Bodwell House, Hallowell, Maine (1875).

Bodwell became the mayor of Hallowell in 1869. He held that position for two years. He was nominated for the governorship of Maine in 1886 and he won the general election by a popular vote. He was sworn into governor's office on January 5, 1887. During his administration, child welfare programs were advocated and the improvement of labor conditions was endorsed. While still in office, he died on December 15, 1887.

Party political offices
Preceded by Frederick Robie	Republican nominee for Governor of Maine; 1886	Succeeded by Edwin C. Burleigh
Political offices
Preceded by Frederick Robie	Governor of Maine; 1887	Succeeded by S. S. Marble
