= Sebastian Streeter Marble =

American politician

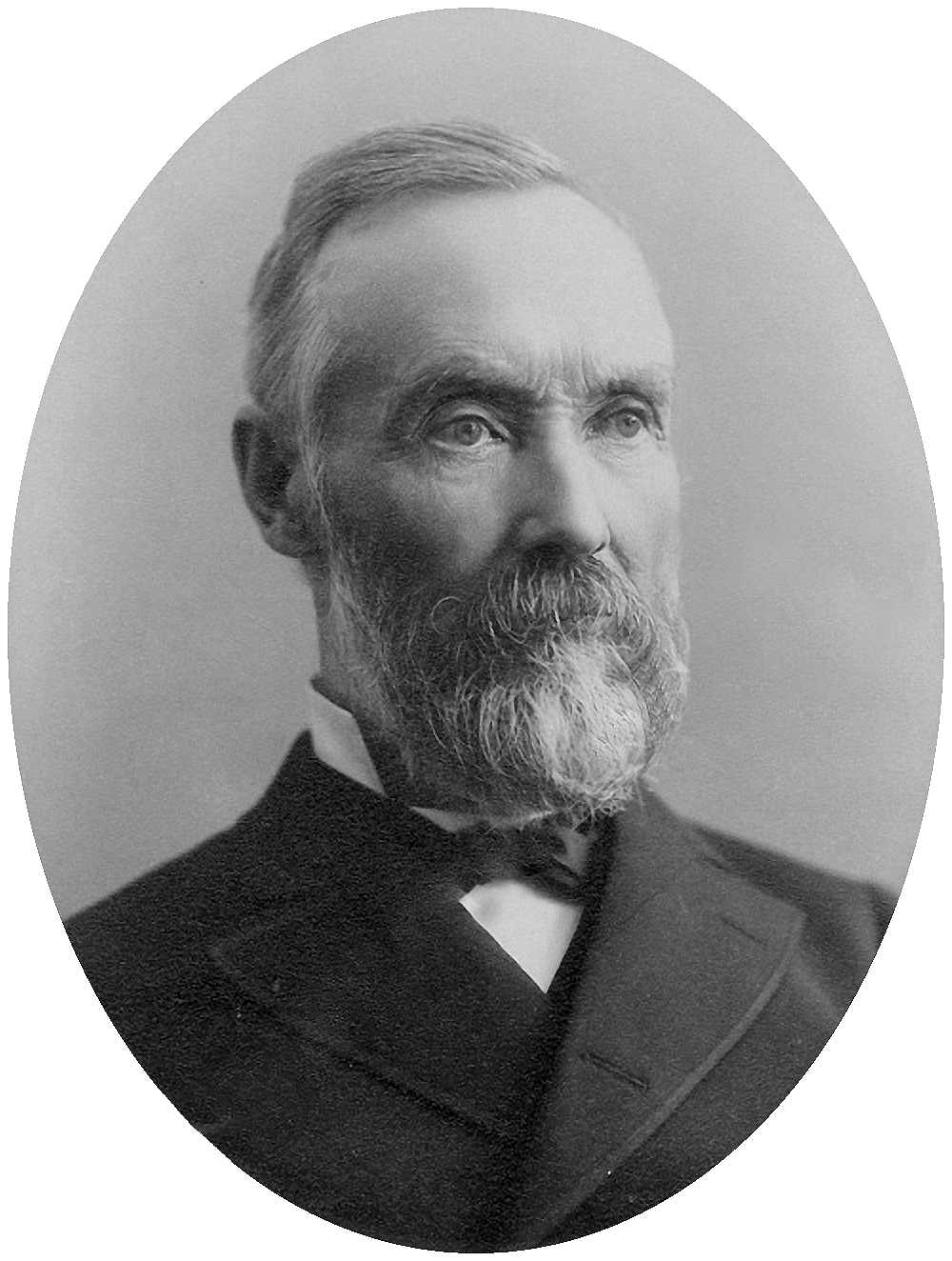

41st Governor of Maine
- In office December 15, 1887 – January 2, 1889
- Preceded by: Joseph R. Bodwell
- Succeeded by: Edwin C. Burleigh

Member of the Maine Senate
- In office 1882–1887

Personal details
- Born: March 1, 1817 Dixfield, District of Maine (now Maine)
- Died: May 10, 1902 (aged 85) Waldoboro, Maine
- Party: Republican
- Education: Waterville Academy
- Profession: Lawyer

Sebastian Streeter Marble (March 1, 1817 – May 10, 1902) was an American lawyer and politician who served as the 41st governor of Maine from 1887 to 1889.

== Biography ==
Marble was born in Dixfield, District of Maine (then a part of Massachusetts) on March 1, 1817, one of nine children of Ephraim Marble (1787 -1871) and his wife, Hannah Packard. He was educated at the Waterville Academy, studied law, and was admitted to the bar in 1843.

He practiced law in Waldoboro, Maine, and became active in the Republican Party. Marble served as federal deputy collector of customs for his district from 1862 to 1863, and collector from 1864 to 1867. Marble was Maine's federal registrar in bankruptcy (a judicial position) from 1867 to 1870, and served as the United States Marshal for Maine from 1870 to 1878.

Marble was a delegate to the Republican National Conventions in 1864 and 1880.

He was elected to three terms in the Maine State Senate beginning in 1882, and was President of the Senate in his last term. Governor Joseph R. Bodwell died on December 15, 1887, and as Senate President, Marble succeeded to the governorship. Marble was unsuccessful in his bid for election to a full term; he was 71 at the time and the Republican party decided to nominate a younger candidate. They settled on Edwin C. Burleigh, who was nominated and won the general election.

Marble left office at the end of his term on January 2, 1889. He remained active in his local community, including service on the school board and chairman of the Board of Selectmen. He died in Waldoboro on May 10, 1902, and was buried at the town's Rural Cemetery.

== Sources ==
- Sobel, Robert and John Raimo. Biographical Directory of the Governors of the United States, 1789-1978. Greenwood Press, 1988. ISBN 0-313-28093-2
- Sebastian Streeter Marble at National Governors Association

Political offices
| Preceded by Joseph R. Bodwell | Governor of Maine; 1887–1889 | Succeeded by Edwin C. Burleigh |
