= William T. Haines =

American politician (1854–1919)

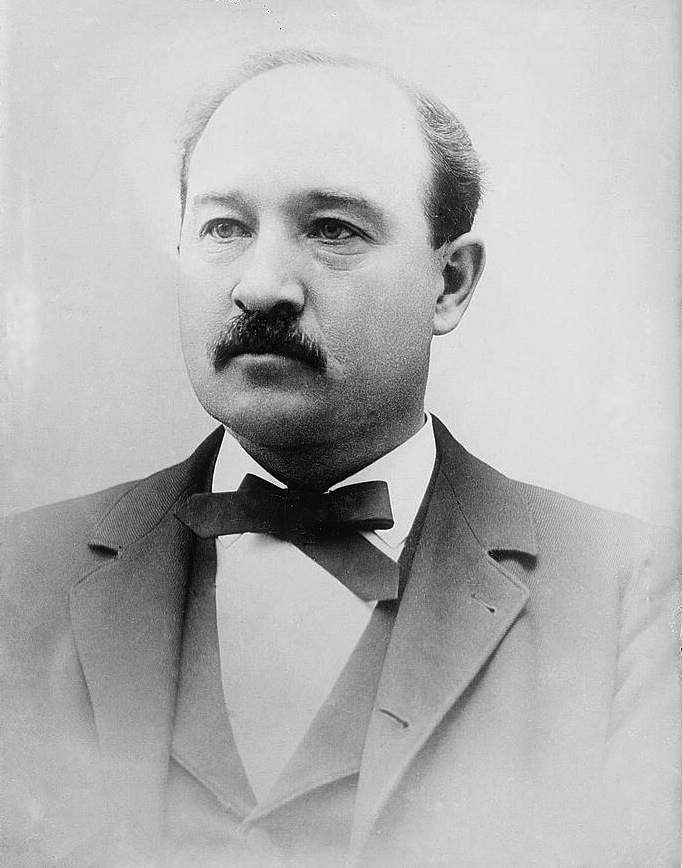

49th Governor of Maine
- In office January 1, 1913 – January 6, 1915
- Preceded by: Frederick W. Plaisted
- Succeeded by: Oakley C. Curtis

Maine Attorney General
- In office 1897–1900
- Governor: Llewellyn Powers
- Preceded by: Frederick A. Powers
- Succeeded by: George M. Seiders

Member of the Maine Senate
- In office 1888-1892

Personal details
- Born: William Thomas Haines; August 7, 1854 Levant, Maine, US
- Died: June 4, 1919 (aged 64) Augusta, Maine, US
- Party: Republican
- Spouse: Edith S. Hemenway
- Education: Maine State College (BA); Albany Law School (LLB)
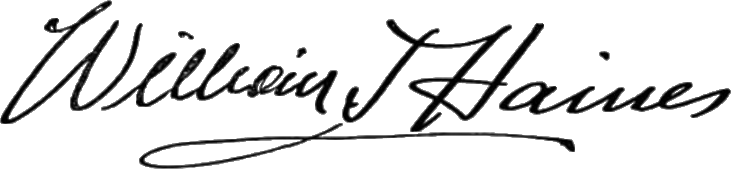
- Signature

William Thomas Haines (August 7, 1854 – June 4, 1919) was an American politician who served as the 49th governor of Maine from 1913 to 1915.

== Early years ==
William Thomas Haines was born in Levant, Maine on August 7, 1854. As an undergraduate at the University of Maine, he founded the Eternal Companions Society on the Orono Campus in 1875. The fraternity was later chartered as the Beta Eta chapter of Beta Theta Pi and Haines was issued roll number 1 in the new organization. He graduated as Valedictorian of the University of Maine class of 1876 and went on to study law at Albany Law School where he completed his LL.B. degree in 1878. In May, 1879, Haines settled at Oakland (then West Waterville), Kennebec County, Maine, and commenced the practice of law. He remained there until October, 1880. He then moved to Waterville, Maine.

== Politics ==
Haines became the county attorney of Kennebec County in 1882. He held that position for five years. He became a member of the Maine State Senate in 1888. He held that position until 1892. He became a member of the Maine House of Representatives in 1895. He served as the attorney general of Maine (1896-1901) and then became a member of the governor’s executive council (1901-1905).

== Governor of Maine ==
Haines was nominated for the governorship of Maine by the Republican Party in 1912. He went on to win the general election by a popular vote. He held the governor's office from January 1, 1913 to January 6, 1915. During his administration, a bond issue was authorized for road improvements. A public utilities bill and an anti-trust act were sanctioned. He was unsuccessful in his re-election bid.

== Personal life ==
Haines married Edith S. Hemenway. He had three children. He was a Unitarian.

He died from pneumonia in Augusta on June 4, 1919.

Party political offices
Preceded by Bert M. Fernald	Republican nominee for Governor of Maine; 1912, 1914	Succeeded by Carl Milliken
Legal offices
Preceded by Frederick A. Powers	Maine Attorney General; 1897–1900	Succeeded by George M. Seiders
Political offices
Preceded by Frederick W. Plaisted	Governor of Maine; 1913–1915	Succeeded by Oakley C. Curtis
