= Six Towns Times =

Defunct weekly newspaper in Maine

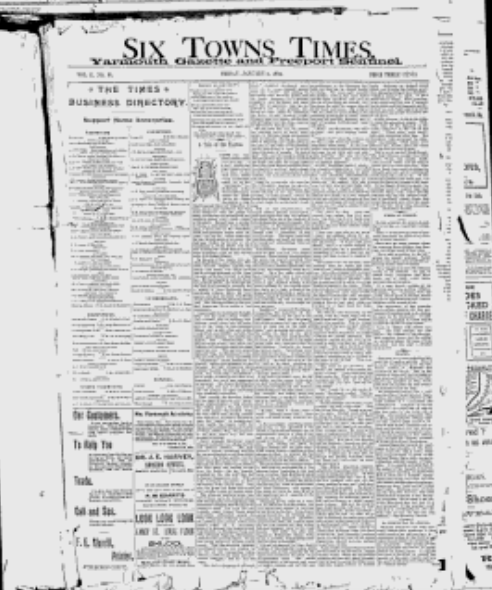
- A front page of the newspaper from 1894
- Type: Weekly newspaper
- Format: Broadsheet
- Publisher: Libby & Smith
- Editor: Charles Thornton Libby
- Founded: November 3, 1892
- Ceased publication: 1916 (109 years ago)
- Headquarters: Freeport, Maine, U.S.
- Circulation: 900

The Six Towns Times was a six-column, eight-page weekly newspaper focused on the news of six towns in southern Maine, United States. It was published on Fridays in Portland, Maine, by Libby & Smith, between 1892 and 1916. It reported the news of six towns: Cumberland, Freeport (where the newspaper was headquartered), Harpswell, North Yarmouth, Pownal and Yarmouth.

In its early days, the newspaper's title was Six Towns Times: Yarmouth Gazette and Freeport Sentinel.

The newspaper had a circulation of 900 during its peak years.

Its editor was Charles Thornton Libby (1861–1948). Yarmouth historian William Hutchinson Rowe called the publication a "lost but not forgotten institution."
