= Frederick W. Plaisted =

American politician (1865–1943)

Frederick William Plaisted
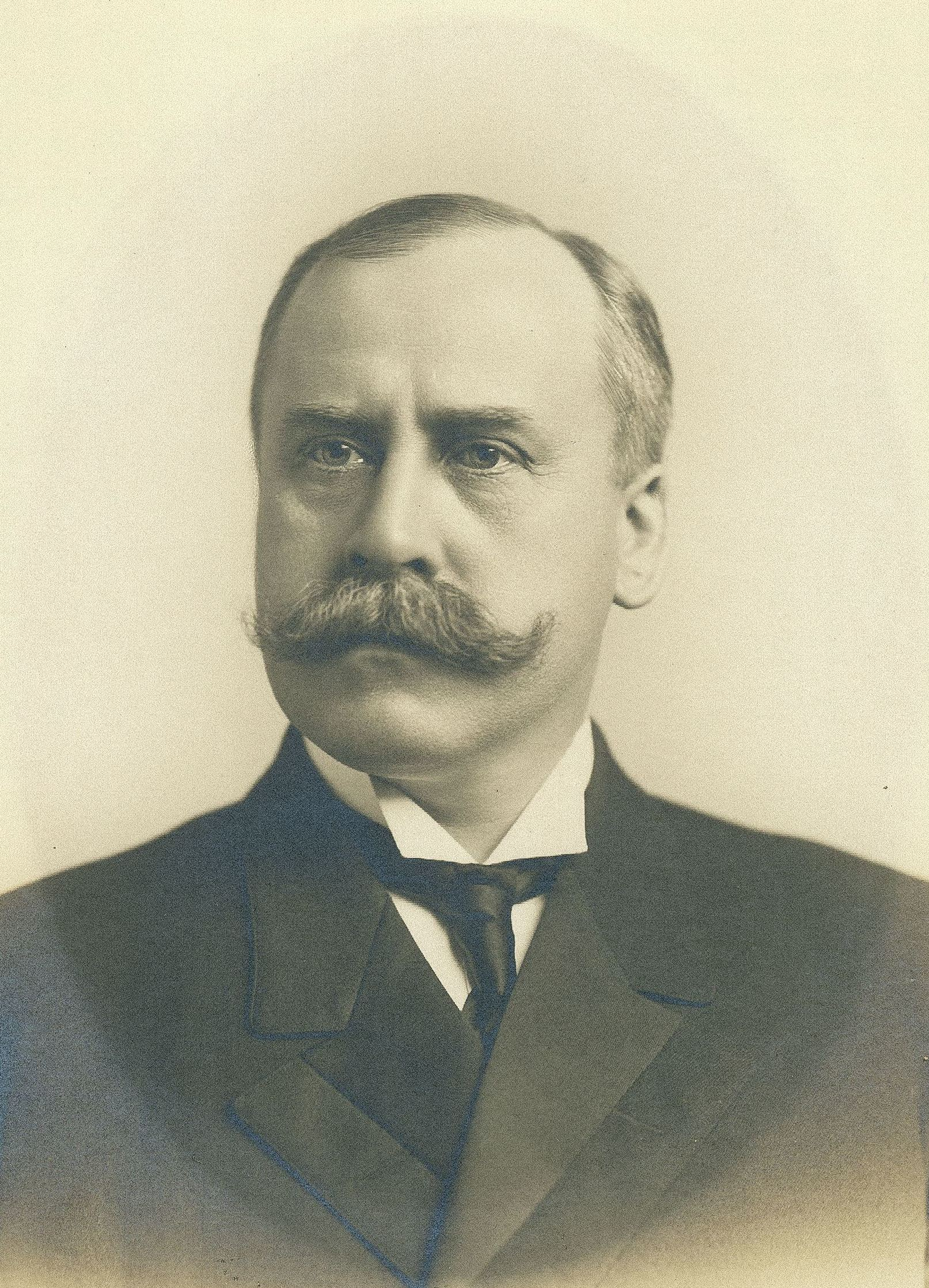

48th Governor of Maine
- In office January 4, 1911 – January 1, 1913
- Preceded by: Bert M. Fernald
- Succeeded by: William T. Haines

Sheriff of Kennebec County, Maine
- In office 1907–1909
- Preceded by: Frank J. Ham
- Succeeded by: Colby Getchell

Mayor of Augusta, Maine
- In office 1910–1911
- Preceded by: Trebey Johnson
- Succeeded by: Reuel J. Noyes
- In office 1906–1909
- Preceded by: Charles S. Hichborn
- Succeeded by: Trebey Johnson

Personal details
- Born: July 26, 1865 Bangor, Maine, U.S.
- Died: March 4, 1943 (aged 77) Los Angeles, California, U.S.
- Resting place: Mount Hope Cemetery, Bangor, Maine
- Party: Democratic Party
- Spouse: Frances Gullifer (m. 1907)
- Education: St. Johnsbury Academy
- Occupation: Newspaper publisher

Frederick William Plaisted (July 26, 1865 – March 4, 1943) was an American politician and the 48th governor of Maine.

== Early life ==
Plaisted was born in Bangor, Maine, on July 26, 1865, the son of Sarah J. (Mason) Plaisted and Harris Plaisted, who served as governor from 1881 to 1883. He studied at local schools and at St. Johnsbury Academy in Vermont. Plaisted established a career in publishing, and in 1889 succeeded his father as publisher and editor of The New Age newspaper in Augusta. Plaisted also became active in the Sons of Union Veterans of the Civil War, and attained the honorary rank of lieutenant colonel after serving on the staff of the organization's national commander in the early 1890s. Afterwards, he was frequently addressed in newspapers and other records as "Colonel" Plaisted.

== Politics ==
Plaisted served as a delegate to the Democratic National Convention in 1896 and again in 1900. He served as mayor of Augusta from 1906 to 1909 and again from 1910 to 1911. He was the Kennebec County sheriff from 1907 to 1909, and was the first Democrat to hold the office.

== Governor ==
Plaisted was the Democratic nominee for governor in 1910 and went on to win the general election, a rare statewide victory at a time when Maine was dominated by the Republican Party. He served from January 4, 1911 to January 1, 1913, and was an unsuccessful candidate for reelection in 1912. During Plaisted's administration, the state government proposed a local option change to the Maine law prohibiting the sale of alcoholic beverages, which was defeated in a popular referendum. In 1912 he oversaw the forced eviction of a 45-member mixed-race community from Malaga Island in the town of Phippsburg.

== Later life ==
After leaving the governorship, Plaisted was appointed postmaster of Augusta. He served until 1923, when he retired and moved to Los Angeles, California.

== Death and burial ==
Plaisted died in Los Angeles on March 4, 1943. He was buried at Mount Hope Cemetery in Bangor.

== Personal life ==
In 1907, Plaisted married Frances Gullifer, and they remained married until his death.

== See also ==
- Malaga Island
- List of mayors of Augusta, Maine

== Sources ==
- Sobel, Robert and John Raimo. Biographical Directory of the Governors of the United States, 1789-1978. Greenwood Press, 1988. ISBN 0-313-28093-2

Party political offices
Preceded by Obadiah Gardner	Democratic nominee for Governor of Maine; 1910, 1912	Succeeded by Oakley C. Curtis
Political offices
Preceded by Bert M. Fernald	Governor of Maine; 1911–1913	Succeeded by William T. Haines
