= Oakley C. Curtis =

American politician (1865–1924)

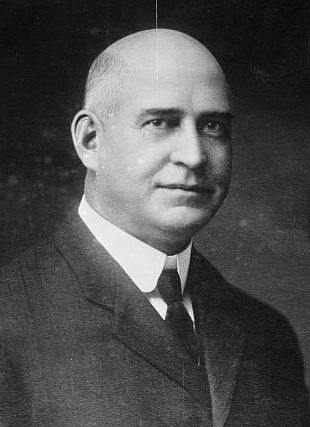

50th Governor of Maine
- In office January 6, 1915 – January 3, 1917
- Preceded by: William T. Haines
- Succeeded by: Carl E. Milliken

46th Mayor of Portland
- In office 1911–1914
- Preceded by: Charles A. Strout
- Succeeded by: William M. Ingraham

Member of the Maine Senate from the 2nd district
- In office January 4, 1905 – January 6, 1909
- Preceded by: Harry R. Virgin
- Succeeded by: Percival P. Baxter
- Constituency: Cumberland County

Member of the Maine House of Representatives from Portland
- In office January 7, 1903 – January 4, 1905

Personal details
- Born: Oakley Chester Curtis; March 29, 1865 Portland, Maine, US
- Died: February 22, 1924 (aged 58) Falmouth, Maine, US
- Party: Democratic
- Spouse: Edith L. Hamilton
- Occupation: Banker; politician

Oakley Chester Curtis (March 29, 1865 – February 22, 1924) was an American banker, businessman, and Democratic Party politician who served as mayor of Portland, Maine (1911-1914) and the 50th governor of Maine (1915-1917). Curtis was known for his involvement in the coal industry, particularly the Randall & McCallister Coal Company. He also served as president of the Casco Mercantile Trust Company and as the director of the United States Trust Company and the Merchants Trust Company. Curtis was president of Randall & McCallister Coal Company at the time of his death.

== Early life ==
Curtis was born in Portland, Maine, on March 29, 1865 to William and Amanda Curtis, originally of Freeport, Maine. After studying at the local schools, he began his working life as a clerk at the Grand Trunk Railway Company office in Portland. At the age of 19 in 1884, he became a clerk for Randall & McAllister Coal Company. In 1895, he was made president and manager of the company. Curtis married Edith L. Hamilton and they had five children. He was a Congregationalist. He was a 32nd degree freemason and involved with the Portland Yacht Club and other local civic organizations.

== Politics ==
Curtis was elected alderman of Portland in 1901 and served for one term. He became a member of the Maine House of Representatives in 1903. He held that position until 1904. He became a member of the Maine State Senate in 1905, and held that position until 1908. Curtis was the Democratic nominee for mayor in December 1909, losing to Republican Charles A. Strout. He ran once again in December 1910, successfully defeating the incumbent. He then served as the mayor of Portland from 1911–1914.

Curtis was nominated for the governorship of Maine by the Democratic Party in 1914. He won the general election by a popular vote. He held the governor's office from January 6, 1915 to January 3, 1917. During his administration, various labor laws were introduced and the Komoos Sieur de Montes National Monument was established. In September 1916, Curtis was defeated for re-election by Republican Carl Milliken.

In 1922, Curtis was drafted by party leaders and was once again the Democratic nominee for statewide office. After an uncontested primary, Curtis lost 42.5% to 57.5% to incumbent Republican Senator Frederick Hale.

== Death ==
Curtis suffered from poor health in his later years and died suddenly on February 22, 1924 at his home in Falmouth, Maine, a suburb of Portland. He is interred at Portland's Evergreen Cemetery.

== Sources ==
- Sobel, Robert and John Raimo. Biographical Directory of the Governors of the United States, 1789–1978. Greenwood Press, 1988. ISBN 978-0-313-28093-1

Party political offices
Preceded by Frederick W. Plaisted	Democratic nominee for Governor of Maine; 1914, 1916	Succeeded by Bertrand G. McIntire
Preceded by Charles Fletcher Johnson	Democratic nominee for U.S. senator from Maine (Class 1); 1922	Succeeded by Herbert E. Holmes
Political offices
Preceded by William T. Haines	Governor of Maine; 1915–1917	Succeeded by Carl E. Milliken
