= Edwin C. Burleigh =

42nd Governor of Maine (1889–1893); United States Senator from Maine (1913–1916)

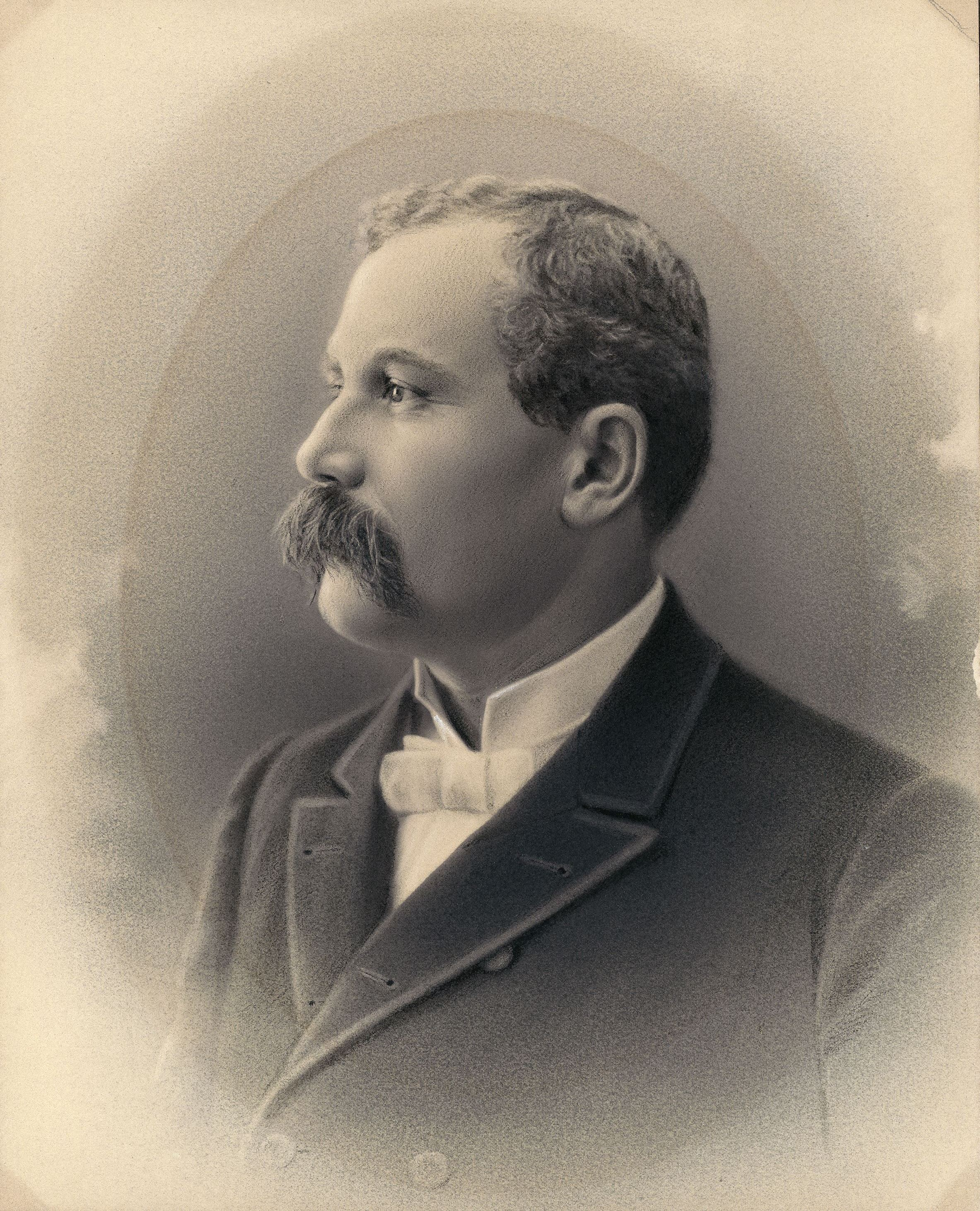

United States Senator from Maine
- In office March 4, 1913 – June 16, 1916
- Preceded by: Obadiah Gardner
- Succeeded by: Bert M. Fernald

Member of the U.S. House of Representatives from Maine's 3rd district
- In office June 21, 1897 – March 3, 1911
- Preceded by: Seth L. Milliken
- Succeeded by: Samuel Wadsworth Gould

42nd Governor of Maine
- In office January 2, 1889 – January 4, 1893
- Preceded by: Sebastian S. Marble
- Succeeded by: Henry B. Cleaves

25th Treasurer of Maine
- In office 1885–1887
- Governor: Frederick Robie
- Preceded by: Samual A. Holbrook
- Succeeded by: George L. Beal

Member of the Maine House of Representatives
- In office 1878

Personal details
- Born: Edwin Chick Burleigh; November 27, 1843 Linneus, Maine, U.S.
- Died: June 16, 1916 (aged 72) Augusta, Maine, U.S.
- Party: Republican

Edwin Chick Burleigh (November 27, 1843 – June 16, 1916) was an American politician who served as the 42nd governor of Maine from 1889 to 1893. A member of the Republican Party, he went on to hold federal office, first in the United States House of Representatives for Maine's 3rd congressional district (1897–1911) and later in the United States Senate (1913–1916).

== Life and career ==
Burleigh was born on November 27, 1843, in Linneus, Maine, the son of Caroline Peabody (Chick) and Parker Prescott Burleigh. He attended the common schools and Houlton Academy before becoming a teacher himself. He also worked as a surveyor and farmer before entering government. He served first as a clerk in the state adjutant general's office and then was clerk in the state land office at Bangor, Maine from 1870 to 1876.

He later moved to Augusta, Maine and became the state land agent from 1876 to 1878 and an assistant clerk in the Maine House of Representatives until 1878. He then served four years (1880–1884) in the office of the Maine State Treasurer before becoming Maine State Treasurer himself in 1884 and serving for four years. During this time he also became principal owner of the Kennebec Journal newspaper. His great grandson is currently a writer for the paper.

In 1889, he was elected the 42nd Governor of Maine, a position he held for three years subsequent. He was elected to the United States House of Representatives in 1897 to fill the vacancy caused by the death of Seth L. Milliken and served in that body for 14 years.

Defeated for re-election in 1910 by Democratic nominee Samuel Wadsworth Gould, Burleigh returned to business for three years until he was elected to the United States Senate in 1912. He served until his death three years later in Augusta, Maine in 1916. His wife died in May 1916 and he died a month later. Both are buried in a family plot at Augusta's Forest Grove Cemetery.

== See also ==
- List of members of the United States Congress who died in office (1900–1949)

== Sources and external links ==
- United States Congress. "Edwin C. Burleigh (id: B001105)". Biographical Directory of the United States Congress.
- The Burleigh family of Linneus
- Bio of Edwin C. Burleigh, as found in ''Representative Men of Maine'' (1893)
- Edwin C. Burleigh, late a senator from Maine, Memorial addresses delivered in the House of Representatives and Senate frontispiece 1917

Party political offices
Preceded by Joseph R. Bodwell	Republican nominee for Governor of Maine; 1888, 1890	Succeeded by Henry B. Cleaves
Political offices
Preceded by Samual A. Holbrook	Treasurer of Maine; 1885–1887	Succeeded by George L. Beal
Preceded by Sebastian S. Marble	Governor of Maine; 1889–1893	Succeeded by Henry B. Cleaves
U.S. House of Representatives
Preceded by Seth Milliken	Member of the U.S. House of Representatives from Maine's 3rd congressional district June 21, 1897–March 3, 1911	Succeeded by Samuel Wadsworth Gould
U.S. Senate
Preceded by Obadiah Gardner	U.S. senator from Maine; March 4, 1913 – June 16, 1916	Succeeded by Bert M. Fernald
