= Bert M. Fernald =

American politician (1858–1926)

Bert Fernald
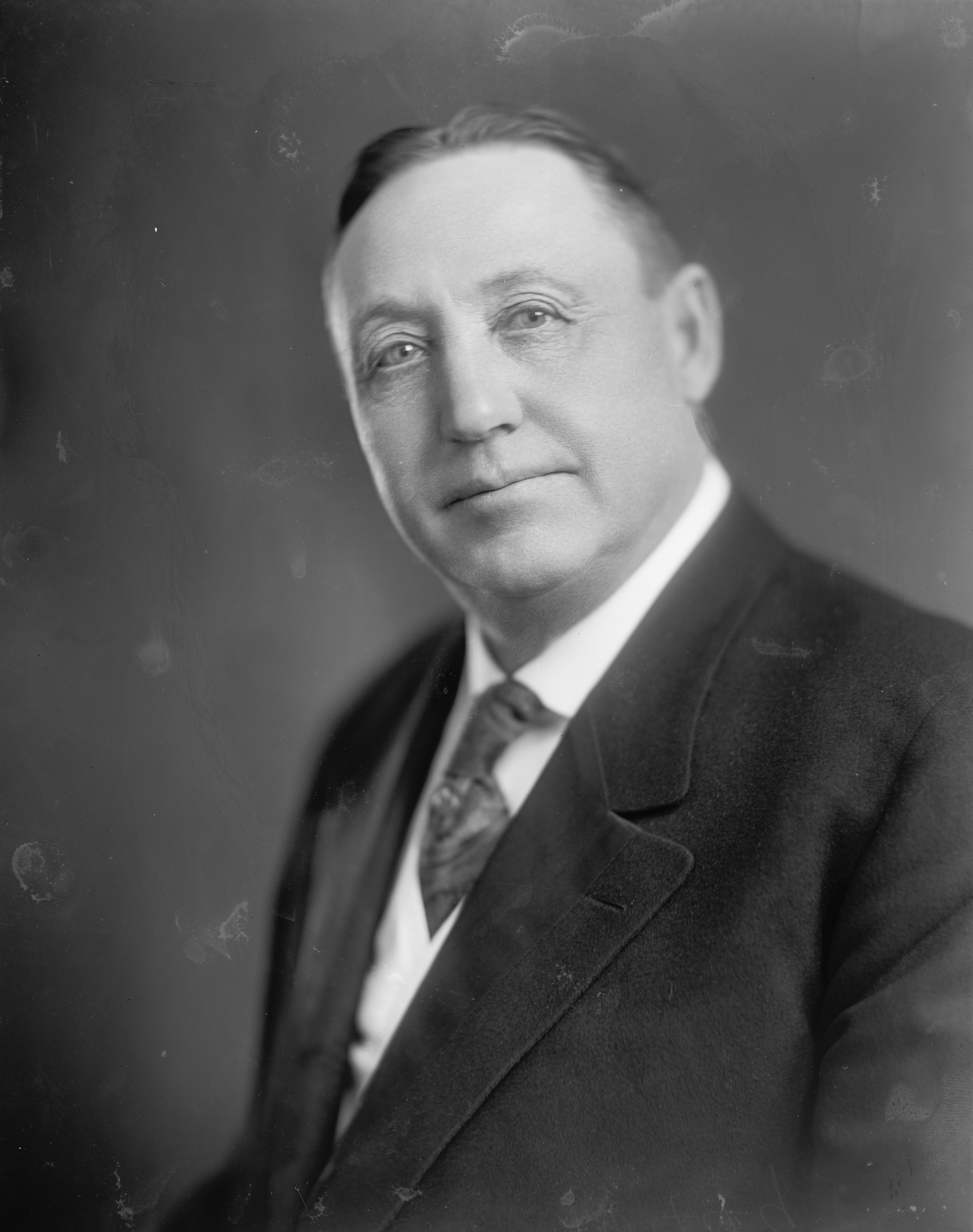

United States Senator from Maine
- In office September 12, 1916 – August 23, 1926
- Preceded by: Edwin C. Burleigh
- Succeeded by: Arthur R. Gould

47th Governor of Maine
- In office January 6, 1909 – January 4, 1911
- Preceded by: William T. Cobb
- Succeeded by: Frederick W. Plaisted

Member of the Maine Senate
- In office 1898–1902

Member of the Maine House of Representatives
- In office 1896–1898

Personal details
- Born: April 3, 1858 Poland, Maine, U.S.
- Died: August 23, 1926 (aged 68) Poland, Maine, U.S.
- Party: Republican
- Spouse: Annie Keene
- Children: 2

Bert Manfred Fernald (April 3, 1858 – August 23, 1926) was an American farmer, businessman, and Republican politician who became the 47th governor of Maine and a United States senator. He served as chairman of the United States Senate Committee on Public Buildings and Grounds for three terms.

== Early life and education ==
Born in West Poland, Maine, Fernald suffered debilitating injuries from an early age, enduring several operations and not beginning to walk until he was six years old. He attended the public schools, and then Hebron Academy until the age of seventeen, when his father died.

== Career ==
Fernald entered a business and preparatory school in Boston, after which he taught school and was elected supervisor of schools in 1878. He then engaged in the canning, dairy, and telephone businesses. Fernald returned to his family's farm, where he "established one of the best Holstein herds in the State", and a corn canning operation. He was elected to the Maine House of Representatives and served from 1896 to 1898, where he became known for his speeches. Fernald was also noted for his fine singing voice. From 1898 to 1902, he served as a member of the Maine Senate.

=== Governor of Maine ===
Fernald was a candidate for governor of Maine in 1904, but was unsuccessful in his bid for the Republican nomination. However, he remained popular in the party, and ultimately secured the nomination in 1908 "without a dissenting vote". He was elected, and served as a governor from 1909 to 1911. In 1910, he was also elected president of the National Canners Association. In April 1909, Fernald vetoed a bill providing mandatory sentences in liquor cases, contending that it would deprive the courts of discretion.

=== United States Senate ===
In 1916, Fernald was elected as a Republican to the U.S. Senate by defeating Kenneth C. M. Sills, the dean of Bowdoin College. In the Senate, Fernand took office on September 12, 1916, and was initially "a radical in his party", but eventually "became one of the staunchest of the Old Guard as he rose to an important position". In his first term, he opposed farm credit measures being debated in Congress, disputing claims that deflation in the aftermath of World War I disproportionately affected farmers. Fernald was reelected in 1918, and in 1919, he "rose to the defense of the packers, then under criticism by the Federal Trade Commission", characterizing the regulation of that industry as "badgering, harrying and heckling American business interests". He supported President Calvin Coolidge, but opposed U.S. entry into the Permanent Court of International Justice. He was reelected again in 1924 and served until his death on August 23, 1926.

== Personal life ==
Fernald married Annie Keene in 1877, with whom he had a daughter and a son. A large man, in 1909, Fernald was a speaker at the annual meeting, in Portland, of the "New England Fat Men's Association", all of whose members had to weigh at least 201 pounds.

Fernald died at his home in West Poland, Maine, following a ten-day illness, at the age of 68.

== See also ==
- List of members of the United States Congress who died in office (1900–1949)

Party political offices
Preceded by William T. Cobb	Republican nominee for Governor of Maine; 1908, 1910	Succeeded by William T. Haines
First	Republican nominee for U.S. Senator from Maine (Class 2); 1916, 1918, 1924	Succeeded by Arthur R. Gould
Political offices
Preceded by William T. Cobb	Governor of Maine; 1909–1911	Succeeded by Frederick W. Plaisted
U.S. Senate
Preceded by Edwin C. Burleigh	United States Senator (Class 2) from Maine; 1916-1926	Succeeded by Arthur R. Gould
