= List of governors of Maine =

Seal of the governor of Maine

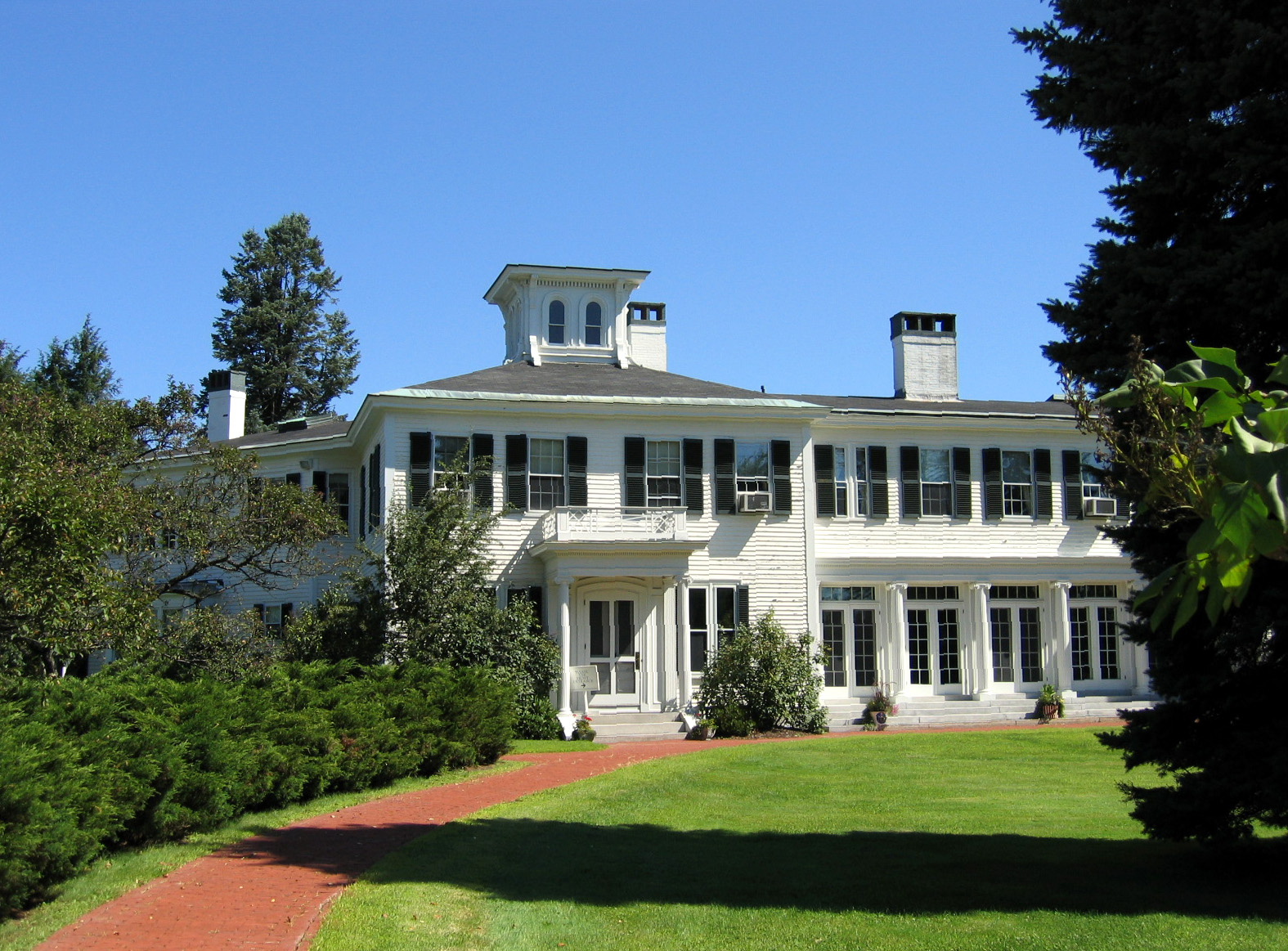
Blaine House is the official residence of the governor of Maine. The Executive Mansion was officially declared the residence of the governor in 1919 with the name "The Blaine House". It is located in Augusta, Maine, across the street from the Maine State House.

The governor of Maine is the head of government of Maine. There have been 71 governors since statehood, serving 75 distinct terms. Four governors served multiple non-consecutive terms (Edward Kent, John Fairfield, John W. Dana, and Burton M. Cross). The longest-serving governor was Joseph E. Brennan, who served two terms from 1979 to 1987. The shortest-serving governors were Nathaniel M. Haskell and Richard H. Vose, who each served only one day. John W. Dana also served for one day in 1844, after the incumbent governor resigned, but was later elected to the governorship. The current governor is Democrat Janet Mills, who took office on January 2, 2019.

== Governors ==
The District of Maine of Massachusetts was admitted to the Union on March 15, 1820, as the State of Maine. The Maine Constitution of 1820 originally established a gubernatorial term of one year, to begin on the first Wednesday of January; constitutional amendments expanded this to two years in 1879 and to four years in 1957. The 1957 amendment also prohibited governors from succeeding themselves after serving two terms. The constitution does not establish an office of lieutenant governor; a vacancy in the office of governor is filled by the president of the Maine Senate, who, prior to an amendment in 1964, only acted as governor.

Governors of the State of Maine
No. (Note: The numbering from the Maine State Law and Legislative Reference Library notes that, in the past, Burton M. Cross and Nathaniel M. Haskell's short terms in 1952–1953 were not counted, and they corrected the count by one prior to John R. McKernan Jr.'s inauguration.)	Governor	Term in office	Party	Election
1	William King (1768–1852)	May 31, 1820 – May 28, 1821 (363 days; resigned) (Note: King resigned to be a commissioner for the adjustment of Spanish claims in Florida.)	Democratic– Republican	1820
2	William D. Williamson (1779–1846)	May 28, 1821 – December 25, 1821 (212 days; resigned) (Note: Williamson resigned, having been elected to the United States House of Representatives.)	Democratic– Republican	President of the Senate acting
3	Benjamin Ames (1778–1835)	December 25, 1821 – January 2, 1822 (9 days; resigned) (Note: Ames felt that, with a new Maine Senate, the new president of the Senate should take office, and resigned upon Daniel Rose being elected.)	Democratic– Republican	Speaker of the House acting
4	Daniel Rose (1772–1833)	January 2, 1822 – January 4, 1822 (3 days; retired)	Democratic– Republican	President of the Senate acting
5	Albion Parris (1788–1857)	January 4, 1822 – January 3, 1827 (1826 days; retired) (Note: Parris was instead elected to the United States Senate; Sobel & Raimo say he resigned upon being elected, but the election was not until January 31.)	Democratic– Republican	1821
5	Albion Parris (1788–1857)	January 4, 1822 – January 3, 1827 (1826 days; retired)	Democratic– Republican	1822
5	Albion Parris (1788–1857)	January 4, 1822 – January 3, 1827 (1826 days; retired)	Democratic– Republican	1823
5	Albion Parris (1788–1857)	January 4, 1822 – January 3, 1827 (1826 days; retired)	Democratic– Republican	1824
5	Albion Parris (1788–1857)	January 4, 1822 – January 3, 1827 (1826 days; retired)	Democratic– Republican	1825
6	Enoch Lincoln (1788–1829)	January 3, 1827 – October 8, 1829 (1010 days; died in office)	Democratic– Republican	1826
6	Enoch Lincoln (1788–1829)	January 3, 1827 – October 8, 1829 (1010 days; died in office)	Democratic– Republican	1827
6	Enoch Lincoln (1788–1829)	January 3, 1827 – October 8, 1829 (1010 days; died in office)	Democratic– Republican	1828
7	Nathan Cutler (1775–1861)	October 8, 1829 – February 5, 1830 (121 days; new senate seated) (Note: The Senate that Cutler was president of had ended, and there was controversy over if he could remain governor; the Maine Supreme Judicial Court ruled against him. Sobel & Raimo say that he resigned at this point, but no source corroborates this.)	Democratic– Republican (Note: Sobel & Raimo describe Cutler as a Democrat, but Kallenbach and Glashan label him a Democratic-Republican.)	President of the Senate acting
8	Joshua Hall (1768–1862)	February 5, 1830 – February 10, 1830 (6 days; retired)	Democratic– Republican	Speaker of the House acting
9	Jonathan G. Hunton (1781–1851)	February 10, 1830 – January 8, 1831 (333 days; lost election)	National; Republican	1829
10	Samuel E. Smith (1788–1860)	January 8, 1831 – January 2, 1834 (1091 days; lost nomination)	Democratic (Note: Sources label Smith either a Jacksonian Democrat or a Democratic-Republican.)	1830
10	Samuel E. Smith (1788–1860)	January 8, 1831 – January 2, 1834 (1091 days; lost nomination)	Democratic	1831
10	Samuel E. Smith (1788–1860)	January 8, 1831 – January 2, 1834 (1091 days; lost nomination)	Democratic	1832
11	Robert P. Dunlap (1794–1859)	January 2, 1834 – January 3, 1838 (1463 days; retired)	Democratic	1833
11	Robert P. Dunlap (1794–1859)	January 2, 1834 – January 3, 1838 (1463 days; retired)	Democratic	1834
11	Robert P. Dunlap (1794–1859)	January 2, 1834 – January 3, 1838 (1463 days; retired)	Democratic	1835
11	Robert P. Dunlap (1794–1859)	January 2, 1834 – January 3, 1838 (1463 days; retired)	Democratic	1836
12	Edward Kent (1802–1877)	January 19, 1838 (Note: Kent won a close election, but Democrats challenged the election. He was finally declared winner by the Maine Supreme Judicial Court and sworn in on January 19, 1838. Dunlap left office on January 3, but no source mentions if the president of the Senate acted as governor in the interim.) – January 2, 1839 (349 days; lost election)	Whig	1837
13	John Fairfield (1797–1847)	January 2, 1839 – January 12, 1841 (742 days; lost election) (Note: The 1840 election was very close, and the legislature had to decide a winner. Due to the delay, President of the Senate Vose declared himself acting governor on January 12, 1841, under the principle that the office was vacant, so it fell to him. Sobel & Raimo write that Vose took over after Fairfield resigned, but this appears to be a mistake, mixing it up with Fairfield's resignation in 1843.)	Democratic	1838
13	John Fairfield (1797–1847)	January 2, 1839 – January 12, 1841 (742 days; lost election)	Democratic	1839
14	Richard H. Vose (1803–1864)	January 12, 1841 – January 13, 1841 (2 days; retired)	Whig	President of the Senate acting
15	Edward Kent (1802–1877)	January 13, 1841 – January 5, 1842 (358 days; lost election)	Whig	1840
16	John Fairfield (1797–1847)	January 5, 1842 – March 7, 1843 (427 days; resigned) (Note: Fairfield resigned, having been elected to the United States Senate.)	Democratic	1841
16	John Fairfield (1797–1847)	January 5, 1842 – March 7, 1843 (427 days; resigned)	Democratic	1842
17	Edward Kavanagh (1795–1844)	March 7, 1843 – January 1, 1844 (301 days; resigned) (Note: Kavanagh resigned due to ill health; he died 19 days later.)	Democratic	President of the Senate acting
18	David Dunn (1811–1894)	January 1, 1844 – January 3, 1844 (3 days; resigned) (Note: Dunn resigned once the new Maine Legislature was sworn in and a president of the Senate chosen.)	Democratic	Speaker of the House acting
19	John W. Dana (1808–1867)	January 3, 1844 – January 5, 1844 (3 days; retired)	Democratic	President of the Senate acting
20	Hugh J. Anderson (1801–1881)	January 5, 1844 – May 18, 1847 (1230 days; retired)	Democratic	1843
20	Hugh J. Anderson (1801–1881)	January 5, 1844 – May 18, 1847 (1230 days; retired)	Democratic	1844
20	Hugh J. Anderson (1801–1881)	January 5, 1844 – May 18, 1847 (1230 days; retired)	Democratic	1845
21	John W. Dana (1808–1867)	May 18, 1847 – May 13, 1850 (1092 days; retired)	Democratic	1846
21	John W. Dana (1808–1867)	May 18, 1847 – May 13, 1850 (1092 days; retired)	Democratic	1847
21	John W. Dana (1808–1867)	May 18, 1847 – May 13, 1850 (1092 days; retired)	Democratic	1848
22	John Hubbard (1794–1869)	May 13, 1850 – January 18, 1853 (982 days; lost election)	Democratic	1849
22	John Hubbard (1794–1869)	May 13, 1850 – January 18, 1853 (982 days; lost election)	Democratic	1850
23	William G. Crosby (1805–1881)	January 18, 1853 – January 6, 1855 (719 days; retired)	Whig	1852
23	William G. Crosby (1805–1881)	January 18, 1853 – January 6, 1855 (719 days; retired)	Whig	1853
24	Anson Morrill (1803–1887)	January 6, 1855 – January 4, 1856 (364 days; lost election)	Republican (Note: Dubin and Kallenbach label Morrill an "Anti Maine-Law" and American, Glashan labels him an "Anti-Nebraska Fusion (Republican)" and Sobel & Raimo simply label him Republican.)	1854
25	Samuel Wells (1801–1868)	January 4, 1856 – January 8, 1857 (371 days; lost election)	Democratic	1855
26	Hannibal Hamlin (1809–1891)	January 8, 1857 – February 26, 1857 (50 days; resigned) (Note: Hamlin resigned, having been elected to the United States Senate.)	Republican	1856
27	Joseph H. Williams (1814–1896)	February 26, 1857 – January 8, 1858 (317 days; retired)	Republican	President of the Senate acting
28	Lot M. Morrill (1813–1883)	January 8, 1858 – January 3, 1861 (1092 days; retired)	Republican	1857
28	Lot M. Morrill (1813–1883)	January 8, 1858 – January 3, 1861 (1092 days; retired)	Republican	1858
28	Lot M. Morrill (1813–1883)	January 8, 1858 – January 3, 1861 (1092 days; retired)	Republican	1859
29	Israel Washburn Jr. (1813–1883)	January 3, 1861 – January 8, 1863 (736 days; retired)	Republican	1860
29	Israel Washburn Jr. (1813–1883)	January 3, 1861 – January 8, 1863 (736 days; retired)	Republican	1861
30	Abner Coburn (1803–1885)	January 8, 1863 – January 7, 1864 (365 days; retired)	Republican	1862
31	Samuel Cony (1811–1870)	January 7, 1864 – January 3, 1867 (1093 days; retired)	Republican	1863
31	Samuel Cony (1811–1870)	January 7, 1864 – January 3, 1867 (1093 days; retired)	Republican	1864
31	Samuel Cony (1811–1870)	January 7, 1864 – January 3, 1867 (1093 days; retired)	Republican	1865
32	Joshua Chamberlain (1828–1914)	January 3, 1867 – January 5, 1871 (1464 days; retired)	Republican	1866
32	Joshua Chamberlain (1828–1914)	January 3, 1867 – January 5, 1871 (1464 days; retired)	Republican	1867
32	Joshua Chamberlain (1828–1914)	January 3, 1867 – January 5, 1871 (1464 days; retired)	Republican	1868
32	Joshua Chamberlain (1828–1914)	January 3, 1867 – January 5, 1871 (1464 days; retired)	Republican	1869
33	Sidney Perham (1819–1907)	January 5, 1871 – January 8, 1874 (1100 days; retired)	Republican	1870
33	Sidney Perham (1819–1907)	January 5, 1871 – January 8, 1874 (1100 days; retired)	Republican	1871
33	Sidney Perham (1819–1907)	January 5, 1871 – January 8, 1874 (1100 days; retired)	Republican	1872
34	Nelson Dingley Jr. (1832–1899)	January 8, 1874 – January 6, 1876 (729 days; retired)	Republican	1873
34	Nelson Dingley Jr. (1832–1899)	January 8, 1874 – January 6, 1876 (729 days; retired)	Republican	1874
35	Seldon Connor (1839–1917)	January 6, 1876 – January 8, 1879 (1099 days; lost election)	Republican	1875
35	Seldon Connor (1839–1917)	January 6, 1876 – January 8, 1879 (1099 days; lost election)	Republican	1876
35	Seldon Connor (1839–1917)	January 6, 1876 – January 8, 1879 (1099 days; lost election)	Republican	1877
36	Alonzo Garcelon (1813–1906)	January 8, 1879 – January 17, 1880 (375 days; lost election)	Democratic	1878
37	Daniel F. Davis (1843–1897)	January 17, 1880 (Note: The 1879 election was not close, but at the time a governor had to receive a majority of votes cast, and Davis fell slightly short. Governor Garcelon refused to certify new Republican members of the legislature, instead seating Democrats, which led to the State Supreme Court ruling against him. A Fusionist legislature declared Joseph L. Smith the winner, and inaugurated him on January 17; however, this was not considered legitimate, and Davis was inaugurated later that day when the Republican legislature met.) – January 13, 1881 (363 days; lost election)	Republican	1879
38	Harris M. Plaisted (1828–1898)	January 13, 1881 – January 4, 1883 (722 days; lost election)	Greenback (Note: Kallenbach and Sobel & Raimo label Plaisted as a Democrat and Greenback, while Glashan describes him as "National (or Greenback Labor)".)	1880
39	Frederick Robie (1822–1912)	January 4, 1883 – January 6, 1887 (1464 days; retired)	Republican	1882
39	Frederick Robie (1822–1912)	January 4, 1883 – January 6, 1887 (1464 days; retired)	Republican	1884
40	Joseph R. Bodwell (1818–1887)	January 6, 1887 – December 15, 1887 (344 days; died in office)	Republican	1886
41	Sebastian Streeter Marble (1817–1902)	December 15, 1887 – January 3, 1889 (386 days; lost nomination)	Republican	President of the Senate acting
42	Edwin C. Burleigh (1843–1916)	January 3, 1889 – January 5, 1893 (1464 days; retired)	Republican	1888
42	Edwin C. Burleigh (1843–1916)	January 3, 1889 – January 5, 1893 (1464 days; retired)	Republican	1890
43	Henry B. Cleaves (1840–1912)	January 5, 1893 – January 7, 1897 (1464 days; retired)	Republican	1892
43	Henry B. Cleaves (1840–1912)	January 5, 1893 – January 7, 1897 (1464 days; retired)	Republican	1894
44	Llewellyn Powers (1836–1908)	January 7, 1897 – January 3, 1901 (1457 days; retired)	Republican	1896
44	Llewellyn Powers (1836–1908)	January 7, 1897 – January 3, 1901 (1457 days; retired)	Republican	1898
45	John Fremont Hill (1855–1912)	January 3, 1901 – January 5, 1905 (1464 days; retired)	Republican	1900
45	John Fremont Hill (1855–1912)	January 3, 1901 – January 5, 1905 (1464 days; retired)	Republican	1902
46	William T. Cobb (1857–1937)	January 5, 1905 – January 7, 1909 (1464 days; retired)	Republican	1904
46	William T. Cobb (1857–1937)	January 5, 1905 – January 7, 1909 (1464 days; retired)	Republican	1906
47	Bert M. Fernald (1858–1926)	January 7, 1909 – January 5, 1911 (729 days; lost election)	Republican	1908
48	Frederick W. Plaisted (1865–1943)	January 5, 1911 – January 2, 1913 (729 days; lost election)	Democratic	1910
49	William T. Haines (1854–1919)	January 2, 1913 – January 7, 1915 (736 days; lost election)	Republican	1912
50	Oakley C. Curtis (1865–1924)	January 7, 1915 – January 4, 1917 (729 days; lost election)	Democratic	1914
51	Carl Milliken (1877–1961)	January 4, 1917 – January 6, 1921 (1464 days; lost nomination)	Republican	1916
51	Carl Milliken (1877–1961)	January 4, 1917 – January 6, 1921 (1464 days; lost nomination)	Republican	1918
52	Frederic Hale Parkhurst (1864–1921)	January 6, 1921 – January 31, 1921 (26 days; died in office)	Republican	1920
53	Percival P. Baxter (1876–1969)	January 31, 1921 – January 8, 1925 (1439 days; retired)	Republican	President of the Senate acting
53	Percival P. Baxter (1876–1969)	January 31, 1921 – January 8, 1925 (1439 days; retired)	Republican	1922
54	Owen Brewster (1888–1961)	January 8, 1925 – January 3, 1929 (1457 days; retired) (Note: Brewster instead ran unsuccessfully for the Republican nomination for the United States Senate.)	Republican	1924
54	Owen Brewster (1888–1961)	January 8, 1925 – January 3, 1929 (1457 days; retired)	Republican	1926
55	William Tudor Gardiner (1892–1953)	January 3, 1929 – January 5, 1933 (1464 days; retired)	Republican	1928
55	William Tudor Gardiner (1892–1953)	January 3, 1929 – January 5, 1933 (1464 days; retired)	Republican	1930
56	Louis J. Brann (1876–1948)	January 5, 1933 – January 7, 1937 (1464 days; retired) (Note: Brann instead ran unsuccessfully for the United States Senate.)	Democratic	1932
56	Louis J. Brann (1876–1948)	January 5, 1933 – January 7, 1937 (1464 days; retired)	Democratic	1934
57	Lewis O. Barrows (1893–1967)	January 7, 1937 – January 2, 1941 (1457 days; retired)	Republican	1936
57	Lewis O. Barrows (1893–1967)	January 7, 1937 – January 2, 1941 (1457 days; retired)	Republican	1938
58	Sumner Sewall (1897–1965)	January 2, 1941 – January 4, 1945 (1464 days; retired)	Republican	1940
58	Sumner Sewall (1897–1965)	January 2, 1941 – January 4, 1945 (1464 days; retired)	Republican	1942
59	Horace Hildreth (1902–1988)	January 4, 1945 – January 6, 1949 (1464 days; retired) (Note: Hildreth instead ran unsuccessfully for the Republican nomination for the United States Senate.)	Republican	1944
59	Horace Hildreth (1902–1988)	January 4, 1945 – January 6, 1949 (1464 days; retired)	Republican	1946
60	Frederick G. Payne (1904–1978)	January 6, 1949 – December 25, 1952 (1450 days; resigned) (Note: Payne resigned, having been elected to the United States Senate.)	Republican	1948
60	Frederick G. Payne (1904–1978)	January 6, 1949 – December 25, 1952 (1450 days; resigned)	Republican	1950
—	Burton M. Cross (1902–1998)	December 26, 1952 (Note: Frederick G. Payne resigned at midnight, and President of the Senate Burton M. Cross became acting governor at 12:01am, on December 26. Cross had already been elected to the post, and would take office on January 8, 1953. However, the new Senate elected Nathaniel M. Haskell as president on January 7, so he took over as acting governor for less than a day.) – January 7, 1953 (13 days; new senate president elected)	Republican	President of the Senate acting
—	Nathaniel M. Haskell (1912–1983)	January 7, 1953 – January 8, 1953 (2 days; retired)	Republican	President of the Senate acting
61	Burton M. Cross (1902–1998)	January 8, 1953 – January 6, 1955 (729 days; lost election)	Republican	1952
62	Edmund Muskie (1914–1996)	January 6, 1955 – January 2, 1959 (1458 days; resigned) (Note: Muskie resigned, having been elected to the United States Senate.)	Democratic	1954
62	Edmund Muskie (1914–1996)	January 6, 1955 – January 2, 1959 (1458 days; resigned)	Democratic	1956
63	Robert Haskell (1903–1987)	January 3, 1959 – January 8, 1959 (7 days; retired)	Republican	President of the Senate acting
64	Clinton Clauson (1895–1959)	January 8, 1959 – December 30, 1959 (357 days; died in office)	Democratic	1958
65	John H. Reed (1921–2012)	December 30, 1959 – January 5, 1967 (2564 days; lost election)	Republican	President of the Senate acting
65	John H. Reed (1921–2012)	December 30, 1959 – January 5, 1967 (2564 days; lost election)	Republican	1960 (special)
65	John H. Reed (1921–2012)	December 30, 1959 – January 5, 1967 (2564 days; lost election)	Republican	1962
66	Kenneth M. Curtis (b. 1931)	January 5, 1967 – January 2, 1975 (2920 days; term-limited) (Note: Under a 1957 amendment to the constitution, governors are ineligible to succeed themselves after serving two consecutive elected terms.)	Democratic	1966
66	Kenneth M. Curtis (b. 1931)	January 5, 1967 – January 2, 1975 (2920 days; term-limited)	Democratic	1970
67	James B. Longley (1924–1980)	January 2, 1975 – January 3, 1979 (1463 days; retired)	Independent	1974
68	Joseph E. Brennan (1934–2024)	January 4, 1979 – January 8, 1987 (2928 days; term-limited) (Note: Brennan, being term-limited, had already been elected to the United States House of Representatives when his term ended.)	Democratic	1978
68	Joseph E. Brennan (1934–2024)	January 4, 1979 – January 8, 1987 (2928 days; term-limited)	Democratic	1982
70	John R. McKernan Jr. (b. 1948)	January 8, 1987 – January 5, 1995 (2920 days; term-limited)	Republican	1986
70	John R. McKernan Jr. (b. 1948)	January 8, 1987 – January 5, 1995 (2920 days; term-limited)	Republican	1990
71	Angus King (b. 1944)	January 5, 1995 – January 8, 2003 (2926 days; term-limited)	Independent	1994
71	Angus King (b. 1944)	January 5, 1995 – January 8, 2003 (2926 days; term-limited)	Independent	1998
72	John Baldacci (b. 1955)	January 8, 2003 – January 5, 2011 (2920 days; term-limited)	Democratic	2002
72	John Baldacci (b. 1955)	January 8, 2003 – January 5, 2011 (2920 days; term-limited)	Democratic	2006
73	Paul LePage (b. 1948)	January 5, 2011 – January 2, 2019 (2920 days; term-limited)	Republican	2010
73	Paul LePage (b. 1948)	January 5, 2011 – January 2, 2019 (2920 days; term-limited)	Republican	2014
74	Janet Mills (b. 1947)	January 2, 2019 – Incumbent (Note: Mills' second term began on January 4, 2023, and will expire on January 6, 2027; she is term-limited.) (in office 2882 days)	Democratic	2018
74	Janet Mills (b. 1947)	January 2, 2019 – Incumbent (in office 2882 days)	Democratic	2022
75	Hannah Pingree (b. 1976)	Governor-elect takes office January 6, 2027	Democratic	2026

== See also ==
- Gubernatorial lines of succession in the United States § Maine
- List of presidents of the Maine Senate
- List of Maine state legislatures

== Sources ==
- "Former Maine Governors". National Governors Association.
- "Governors of Maine". Maine State Law and Legislative Reference Library.
- "Maine Constitution". State Democracy Research Initiative. University of Wisconsin Law School.
- Dubin, Michael J. (2003). United States Gubernatorial Elections, 1776–1860: The Official Results by State and County. McFarland. ISBN 0-7864-1439-1 – via Internet Archive.
- Glashan, Roy R. (1979). American Governors and Gubernatorial Elections, 1775-1978. Meckler Books. ISBN 0-7201-1511-6 – via Internet Archive.
- Kallenbach, Joseph E.; Kallenbach, Jessamine S. (1977). American State Governors, 1776-1976. Oceana Publications. ISBN 978-0-379-00665-0 – via Internet Archive.
- Mullaney, Marie Marmo (1994). Biographical Directory of the Governors of the United States, 1988–1994. Greenwood Publishing Group. ISBN 0-313-28312-5 – via Internet Archive.
- Sobel, Robert; Raimo, John (1978). Biographical Directory of the Governors of the United States, 1789-1978. Vol. 2. Meckler Books. ISBN 0-930466-01-2 – via Internet Archive.
- Thorpe, Francis Newton, ed. (1909). The Federal and State Constitutions, Colonial Charters, and Other Organic Laws of the States, Territories, and Colonies Now or Heretofore Forming the United States of America. Vol. 3. United States Government Publishing Office – via Internet Archive.
