= 1852 Maine gubernatorial election =

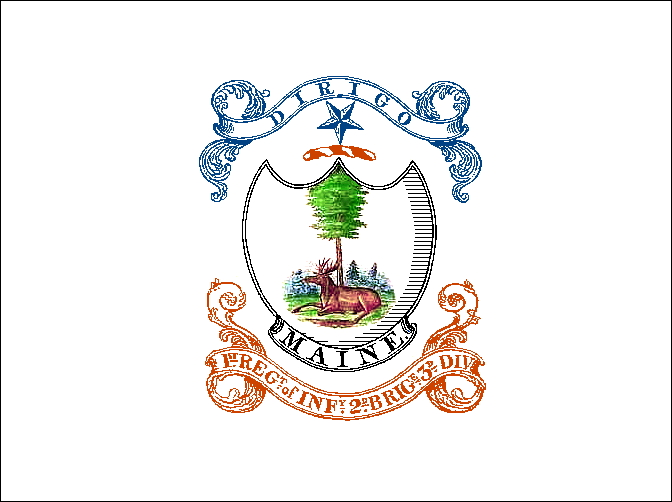
- September 13, 1852
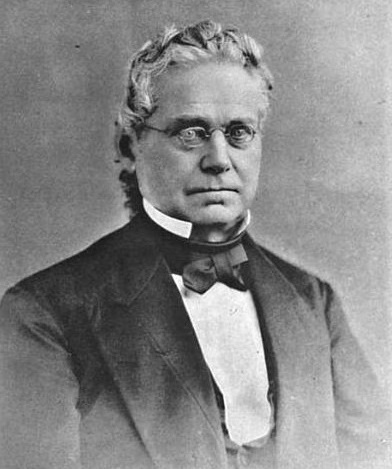

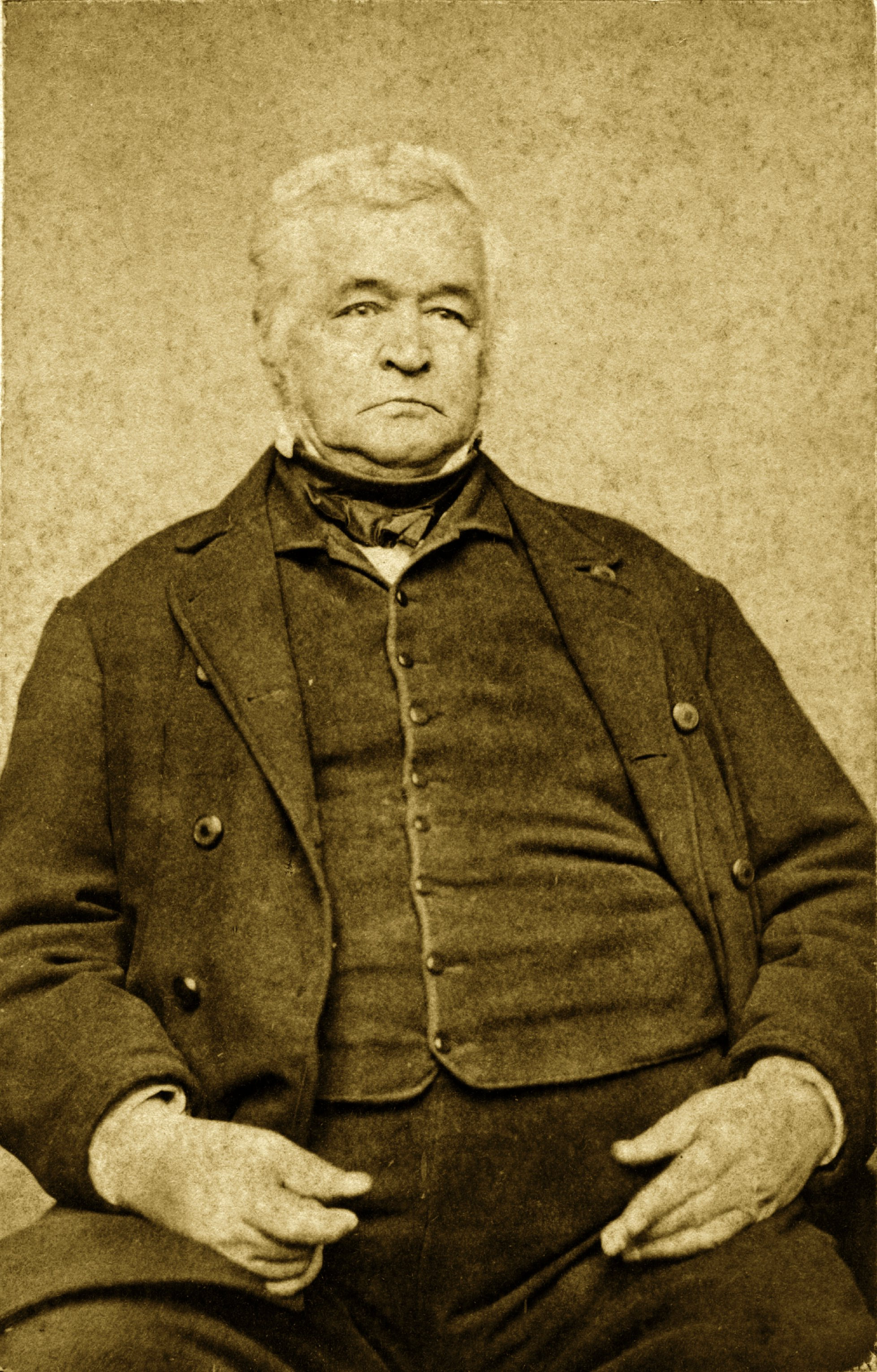

| Nominee | William G. Crosby | John Hubbard | Anson G. Chandler |
| Party | Whig | Democratic | Anti-Maine Law |
| Electoral vote | (Elected) |
| Popular vote | 29,127 | 41,999 | 21,774 |
| Percentage | 30.76% | 44.35% | 22.99% |
- County results Crosby: 40–50% Hubbard: 40–50% 50–60% Chandler: 40–50%
Governor before election
John Hubbard
Democratic
Elected Governor
William G. Crosby
Whig

The 1852 Maine gubernatorial election was held on September 13, 1852, in order to elect the governor of Maine. Whig nominee William G. Crosby defeated incumbent Democratic governor John Hubbard, Anti-Maine Law nominee Anson G. Chandler and Free Soil Party nominee and former member of the Maine Senate Ezekiel Holmes. However, as no candidate received a majority of the total votes cast as was required by Maine law, the election was forwarded to the Maine legislature, who chose Crosby as governor, despite the fact he only came in second in the popular vote.

== General election ==
On election day, September 13, 1852, Whig nominee William G. Crosby won the election despite losing the popular vote by a margin of 12,872 votes against his foremost opponent incumbent Democratic governor John Hubbard, thereby gaining Whig control over the office of governor. Crosby was sworn in as the 23rd governor of Maine on January 5, 1853.

=== Results ===
Maine gubernatorial election, 1852
| Party | Candidate | Votes | % |
|---|---|---|---|
| Whig | William G. Crosby | 29,127 | 30.76 |
| Democratic | John Hubbard (incumbent) | 41,999 | 44.35 |
| Anti-Maine Law | Anson G. Chandler | 21,774 | 22.99 |
| Free Soil | Ezekiel Holmes | 1,617 | 1.71 |
| | Scattering | 190 | 0.19 |
| Total votes | | 94,707 | 100.00 |
| Whig gain from Democratic | | | |
