= 1853 Maine gubernatorial election =

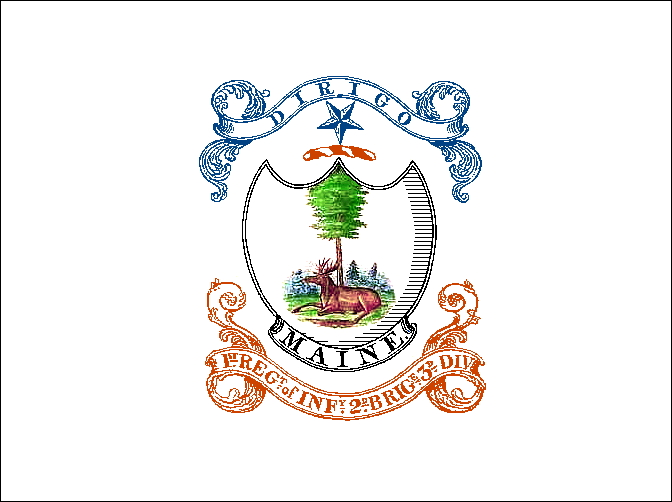
- September 12, 1853
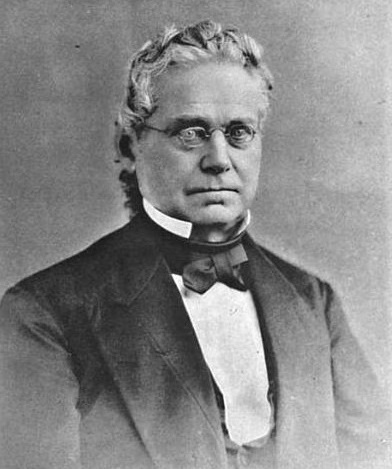

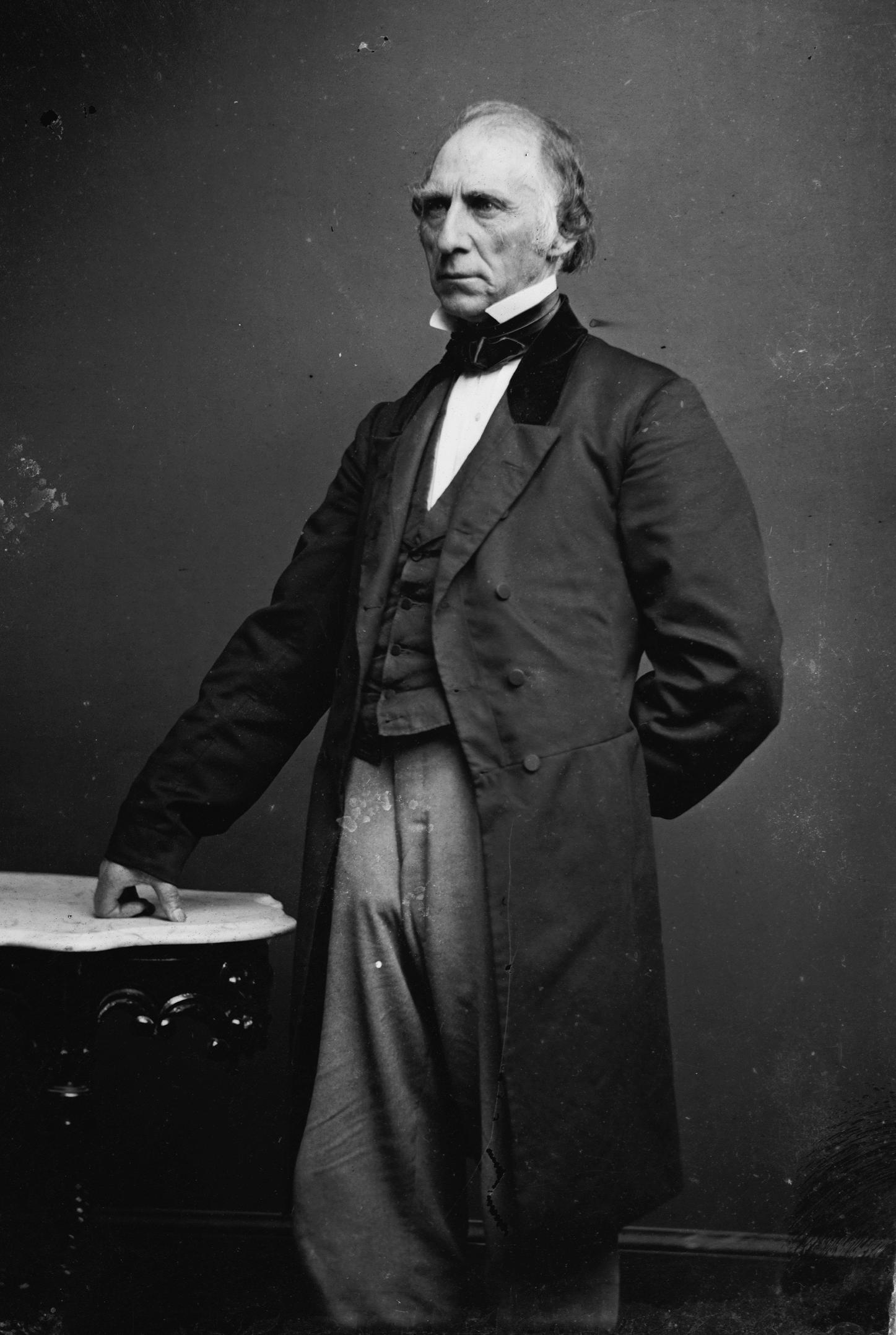

Nominee	William G. Crosby	Albert Pillsbury
Party	Whig	Democratic
Electoral vote	(Elected)
Popular vote	27,061	36,386
Percentage	32.36%	43.51%
Nominee	Anson Morrill	Ezekiel Holmes
Party	Maine Law	Free Soil
Popular vote	11,027	8,996
Percentage	13.19%	10.76%
- County results Crosby: 30–40% 40–50% Pillsbury: 40–50% 50–60%
Governor before election
William G. Crosby
Whig
Elected Governor
William G. Crosby
Whig

The 1853 Maine gubernatorial election was held on September 12, 1853, in order to elect the governor of Maine. Incumbent Whig governor William G. Crosby defeated Democratic nominee Albert Pillsbury, Maine Law nominee Anson Morrill and Free Soil Party nominee and former member of the Maine Senate Ezekiel Holmes. However, as no candidate received a majority of the total votes cast as was required by Maine law, the election was forwarded to the Maine legislature, who chose Crosby as governor, despite the fact he only came in second in the popular vote. In both of his elections, Crosby failed to win the popular vote.

== General election ==
On election day, September 12, 1853, incumbent Whig governor William G. Crosby won the election despite losing the popular vote by a margin of 9,325 votes against his foremost opponent Democratic nominee Albert Pillsbury, thereby retaining Whig control over the office of governor. Crosby was sworn in for his second term on January 3, 1854.

=== Results ===
Maine gubernatorial election, 1853
Party	Candidate	Votes	%
Whig	William G. Crosby (incumbent)	27,061	32.36
Democratic	Albert Pillsbury	36,386	43.51
Maine Law	Anson Morrill	11,027	13.19
Free Soil	Ezekiel Holmes	8,996	10.76
	Scattering	157	0.18
Total votes		83,627	100.00
Whig hold			
