= 1847 Maine gubernatorial election =

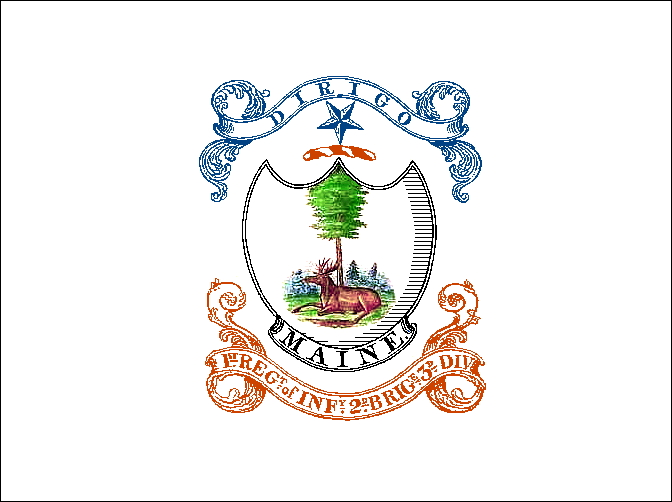
- September 13, 1847
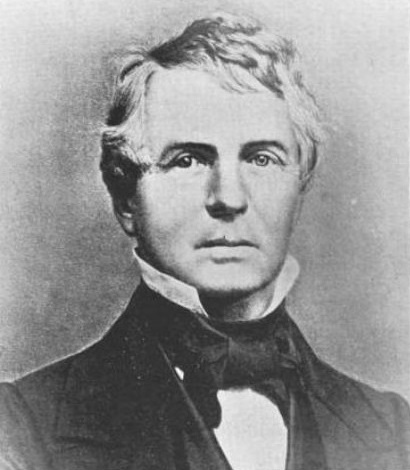

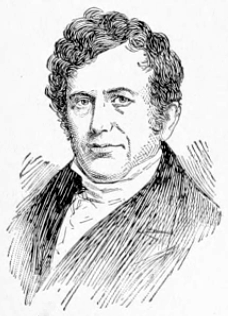
Nominee	John W. Dana	David Bronson	Samuel Fessenden
Party	Democratic	Whig	Liberty
Popular vote	33,429	24,246	7,352
Percentage	51.19%	37.13%	11.26%
- County results Dana: 40–50% 50–60% 60–70% Bronson: 40–50% 50–60%
Governor before election
John W. Dana
Democratic
Elected Governor
John W. Dana
Democratic

The 1847 Maine gubernatorial election was held on September 13, 1847, in order to elect the governor of Maine. Incumbent Democratic governor John W. Dana won re-election against Whig nominee and former member of the Maine Senate David Bronson and Liberty Party candidate and former member of the Massachusetts State Senate Samuel Fessenden in a rematch of the previous election.

== Candidates ==
- David Bronson, former state senator, former U.S. Representative from Maine's 4th district, former state representative, nominee for governor in 1846 (Whig)
- John Winchester Dana, incumbent governor (Democrat)
- Samuel Fessenden, lawyer, abolitionist, and former member of the Massachusetts and Maine state legislatures, nominee for governor in 1845 and 1846 (Liberty)

== General election ==
On election day, September 13, 1847, incumbent Democratic governor John W. Dana won re-election by a margin of 9,183 votes against his foremost opponent Whig nominee David Bronson, thereby retaining Democratic control over the office of governor. Dana was sworn in for his second term on May 8, 1848.

=== Results ===
Maine gubernatorial election, 1847
Party	Candidate	Votes	%	±%
Democratic	John W. Dana (incumbent)	33,429	51.19	▲3.57
Whig	David Bronson	24,246	37.13	▼1.93
Liberty	Samuel Fessenden	7,352	11.26	▼1.16
Write-in		275	0.42	▼0.48
Total votes		65,302	100.00	▼13.69
Democratic hold				
