= 1894 Maine gubernatorial election =

- September 10, 1894
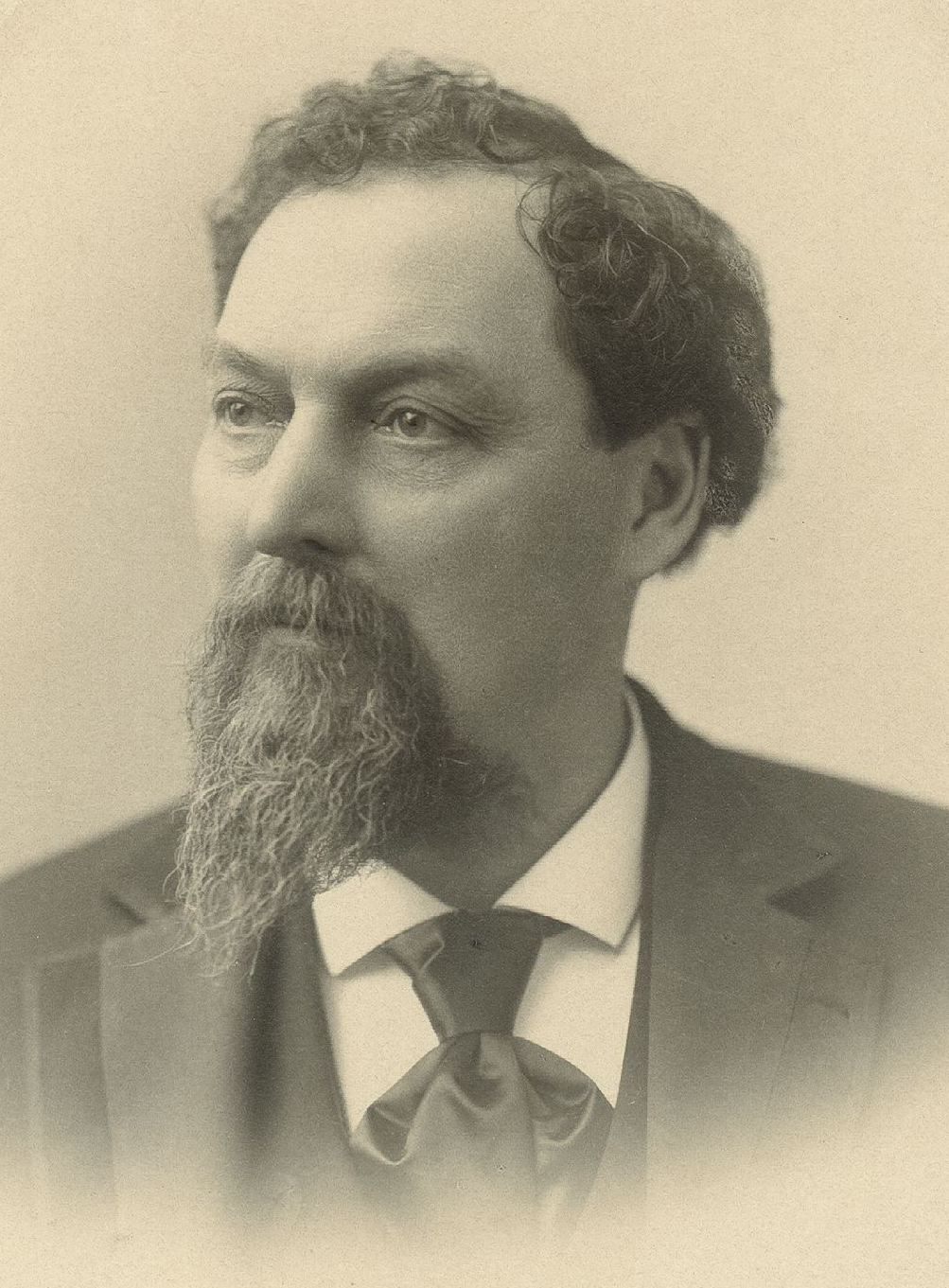

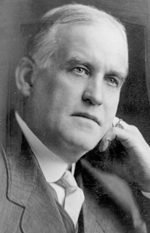
Nominee	Henry B. Cleaves	Charles F. Johnson
Party	Republican	Democratic
Popular vote	69,322	30,405
Percentage	64.31%	28.21%
- County results Cleaves: 50–60% 60–70% 70–80%
Governor before election
Henry B. Cleaves
Republican
Elected Governor
Henry B. Cleaves
Republican

The 1894 Maine gubernatorial election was held on September 10, 1894, in order to elect the governor of Maine. Incumbent Republican governor Henry B. Cleaves won re-election against Democratic nominee Charles F. Johnson, Populist nominee Luther C. Bateman and Prohibition nominee Ira G. Hersey in a rematch of the previous election.

== General election ==
On election day, September 10, 1894, incumbent Republican governor Henry B. Cleaves won re-election by a margin of 38,917 votes against his foremost opponent Democratic nominee Charles F. Johnson, thereby retaining Republican control over the office of governor. Cleaves was sworn in for his second term on January 6, 1895.

=== Results ===
Maine gubernatorial election, 1894
Party	Candidate	Votes	%
Republican	Henry B. Cleaves (incumbent)	69,322	64.31
Democratic	Charles F. Johnson	30,405	28.21
Populist	Luther C. Bateman	5,328	4.94
Prohibition	Ira G. Hersey	2,721	2.52
	Scattering	13	0.02
Total votes		107,789	100.00
Republican hold			
