= 1856 Maine gubernatorial election =

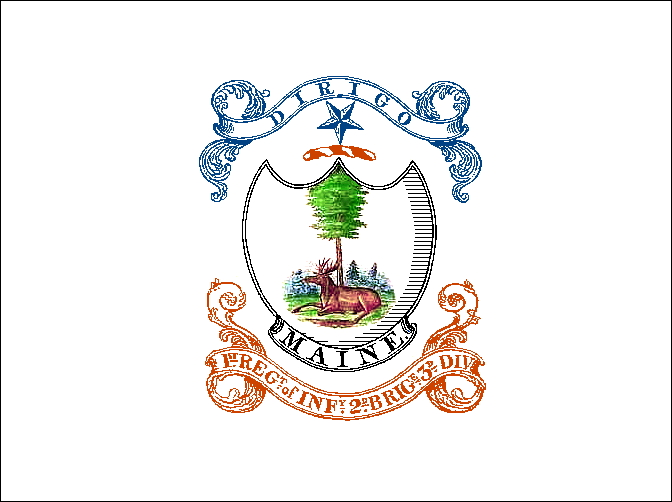
- September 8, 1856
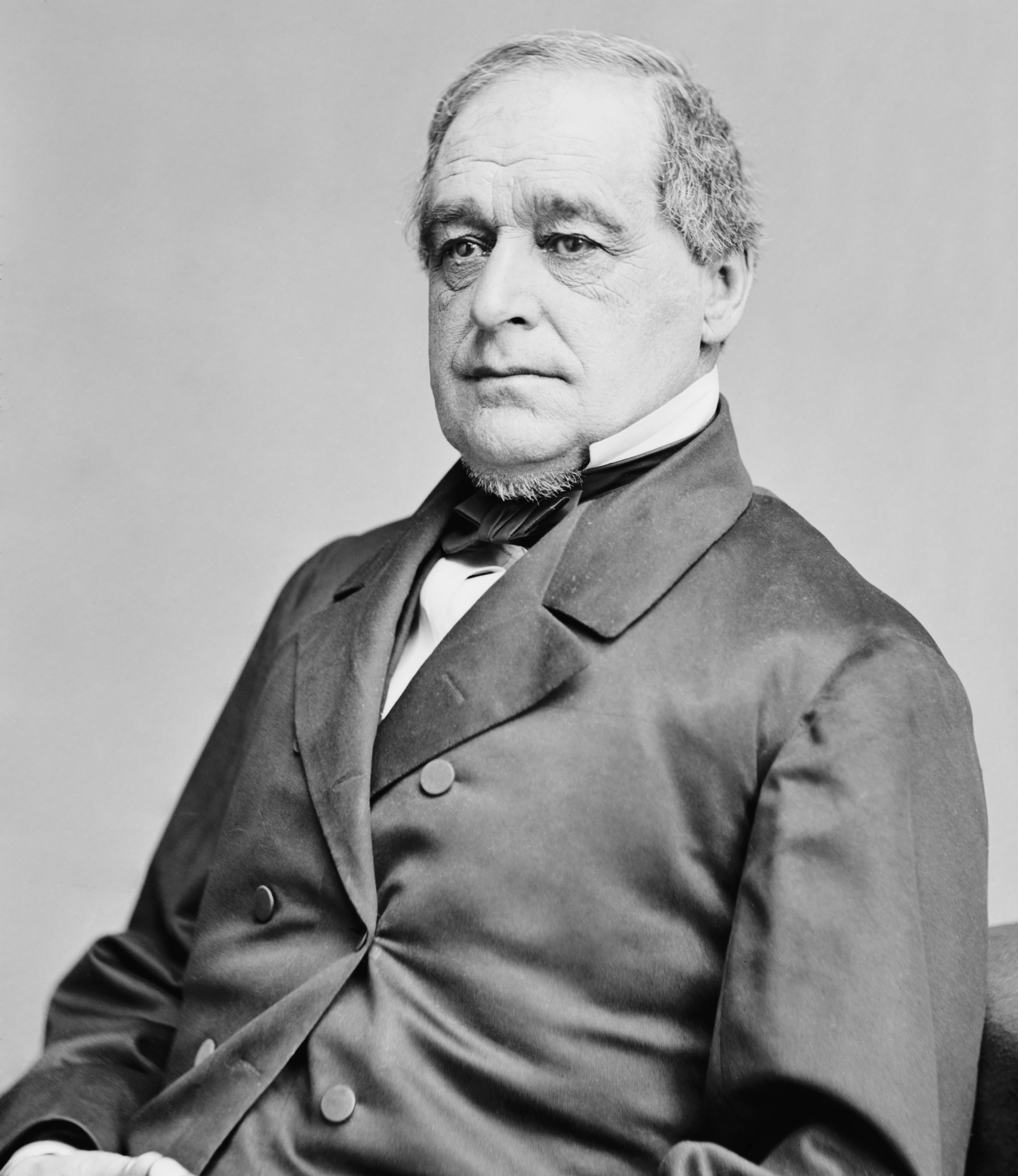

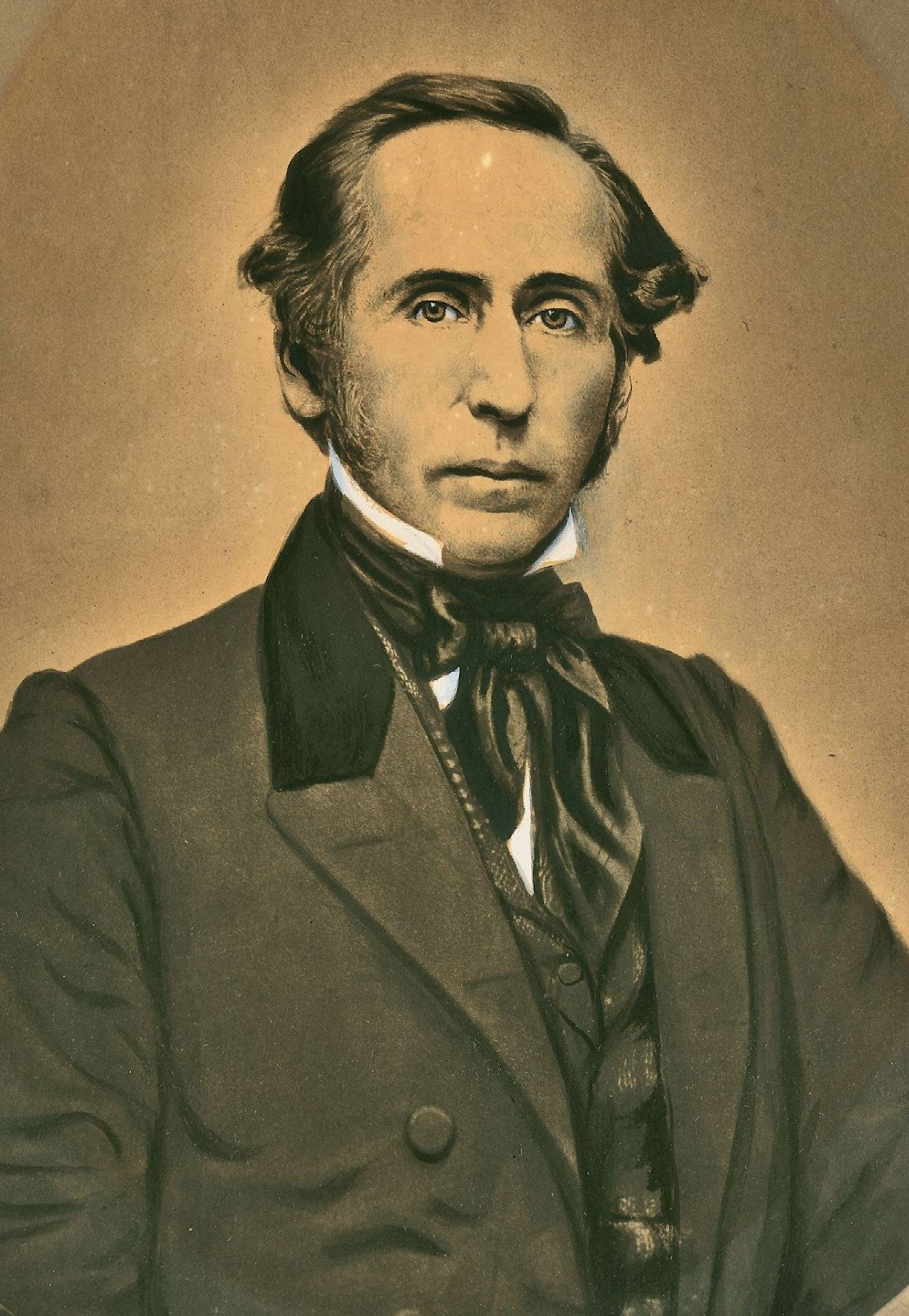

Nominee	Hannibal Hamlin	Samuel Wells	George F. Patten
Party	Republican	Democratic	Whig
Popular vote	69,574	43,628	6,554
Percentage	58.07%	36.41%	5.47%
- County results Hamlin: 50–60% 60–70% Wells: 50–60%
Governor before election
Samuel Wells
Democratic
Elected Governor
Hannibal Hamlin
Republican

The 1856 Maine gubernatorial election was held on September 8, 1856, in order to elect the governor of Maine. Incumbent Democratic governor Samuel Wells lost re-election against Republican nominee and incumbent United States senator from Maine Hannibal Hamlin. Whig candidate George F. Patten received just over 5% of the vote amidst Hamlin's landslide.

== General election ==
On election day, September 8, 1856, incumbent Democratic governor Samuel Wells lost re-election by a margin of 25,946 votes against his foremost opponent Republican nominee Hannibal Hamlin, thereby losing Democratic control over the office of governor to the Republicans. Hamlin was sworn in as the 26th governor of Maine on January 8, 1857.

=== Results ===
Maine gubernatorial election, 1856
Party	Candidate	Votes	%
Republican	Hannibal Hamlin	69,574	58.07
Democratic	Samuel Wells (incumbent)	43,628	36.41
Whig	George F. Patten	6,554	5.47
	Scattering	58	0.05
Total votes		119,814	100.00
Republican gain from Democratic			
