= 1858 Maine gubernatorial election =

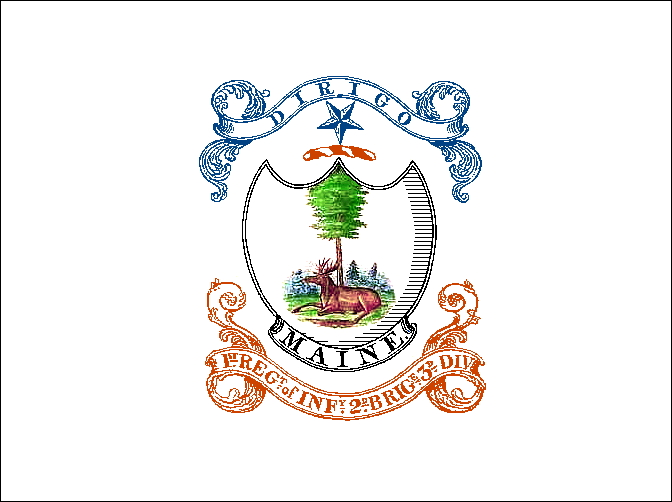
- September 13, 1858
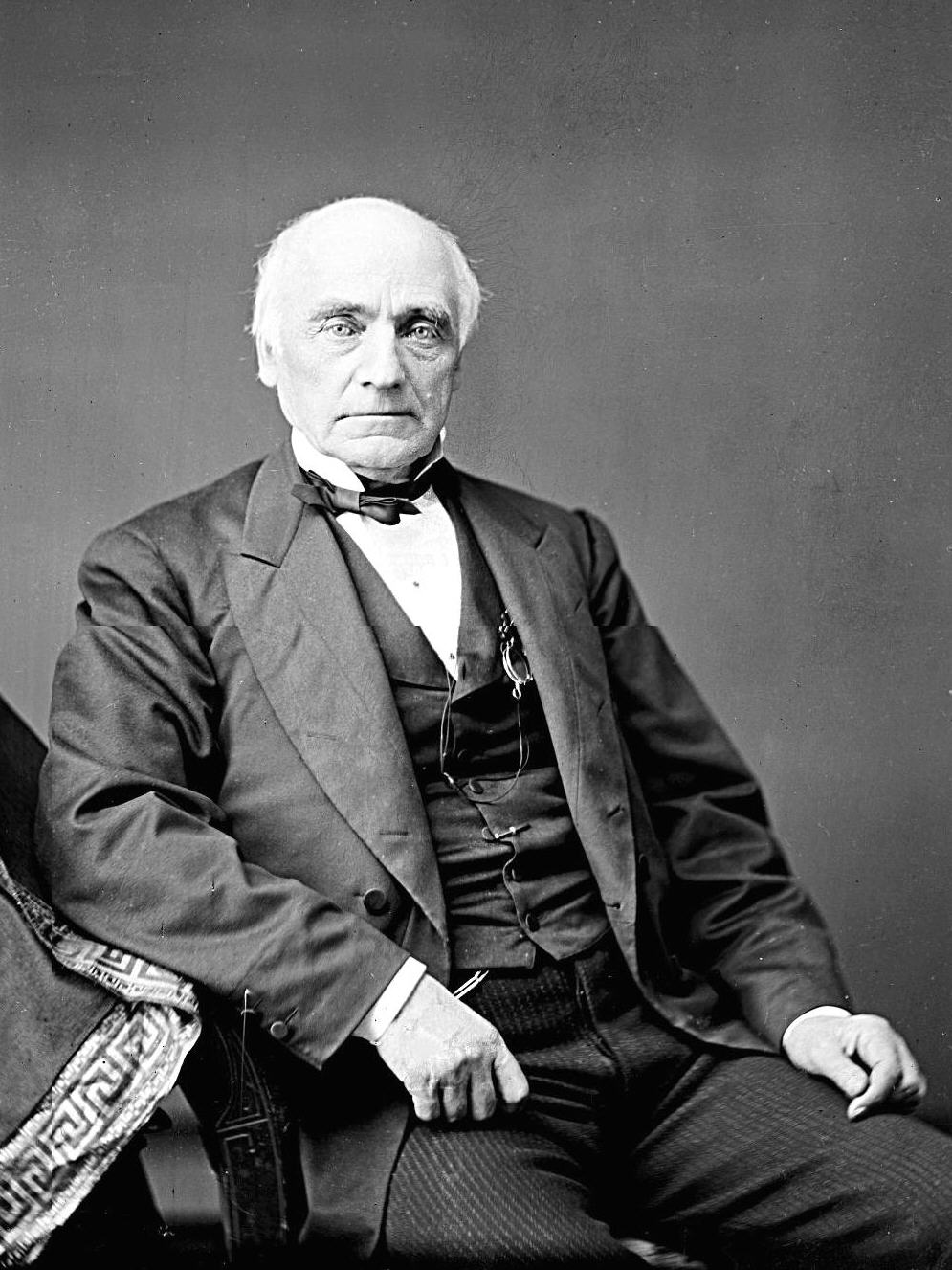

Nominee	Lot M. Morrill	Manassah H. Smith
Party	Republican	Democratic
Popular vote	60,736	52,750
Percentage	53.48%	46.45%
- County results Morrill: 50–60% 60–70% Smith: 50–60% 60–70%
Governor before election
Lot M. Morrill
Republican
Elected Governor
Lot M. Morrill
Republican

The 1858 Maine gubernatorial election was held on September 13, 1858, in order to elect the governor of Maine. Incumbent Republican governor Lot M. Morrill won re-election against Democratic nominee Manassah H. Smith in a rematch of the previous election.

== General election ==
On election day, September 13, 1858, incumbent Republican governor Lot M. Morrill won re-election by a margin of 7,986 votes against his opponent Democratic nominee Manassah H. Smith, thereby retaining Republican control over the office of governor. Morrill was sworn in for his second term on January 6, 1859.

=== Results ===
Maine gubernatorial election, 1858
Party	Candidate	Votes	%
Republican	Lot M. Morrill (incumbent)	60,736	53.48
Democratic	Manassah H. Smith	52,750	46.45
	Scattering	78	0.07
Total votes		113,564	100.00
Republican hold			
