= Governor Crosby =

Governor Crosby may refer to:

- John Schuyler Crosby (1839–1914), 5th Governor of the Montana Territory
- Robert B. Crosby (1911–2000), 27th Governor of Nebraska
- William G. Crosby (1805–1881), 23rd Governor of Maine
