= 1854 Maine gubernatorial election =

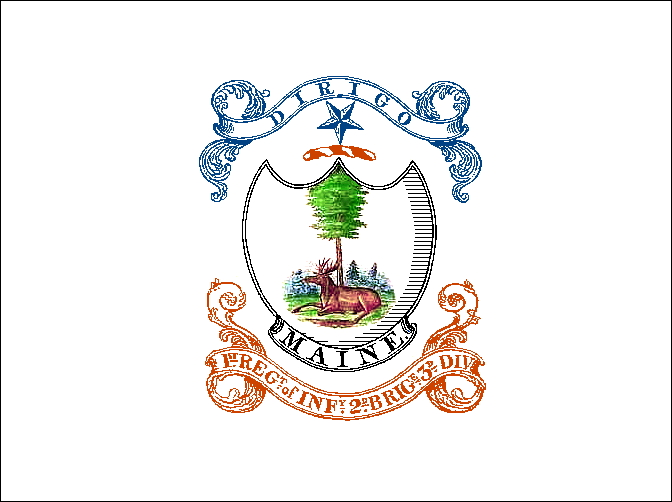
- September 11, 1854
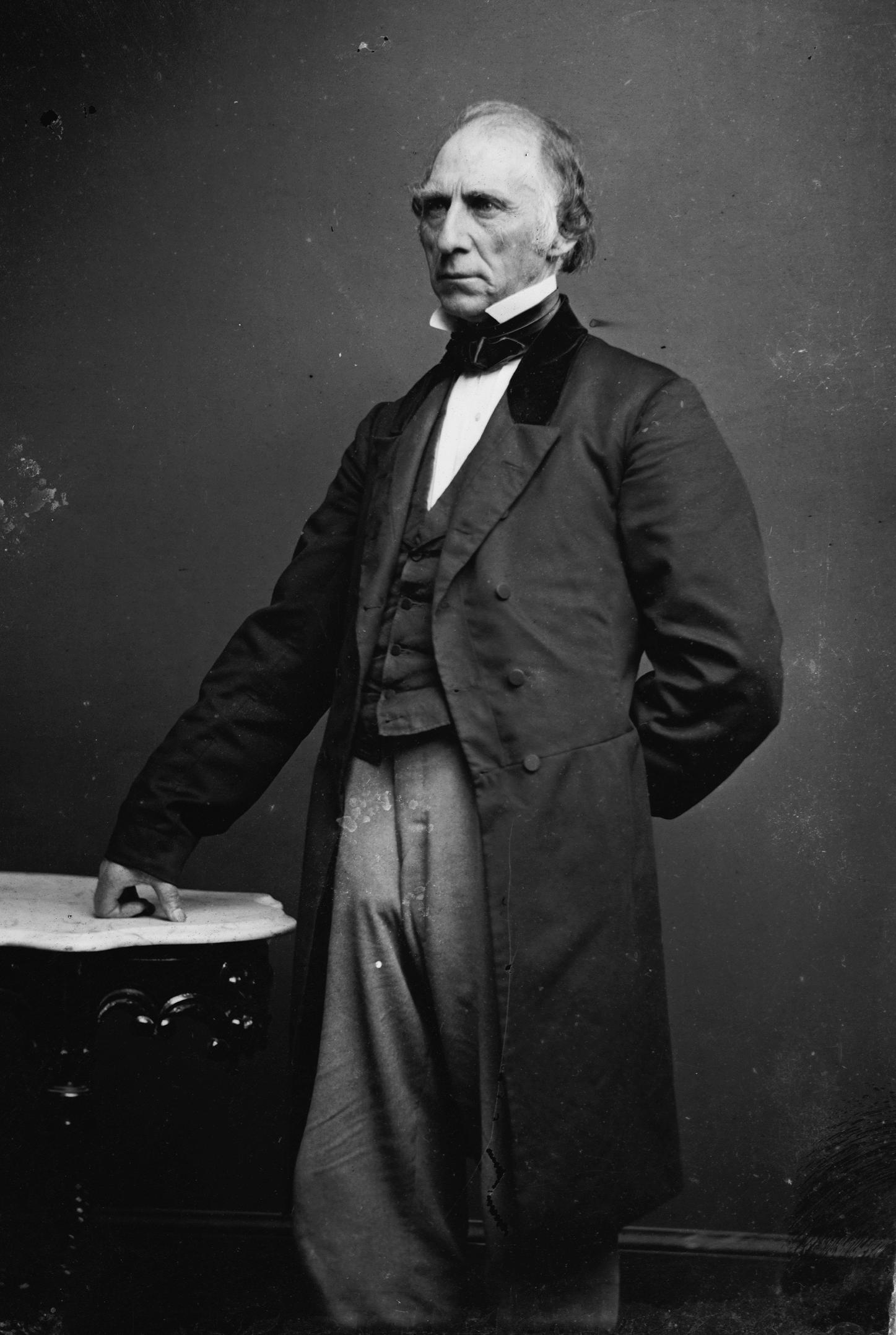

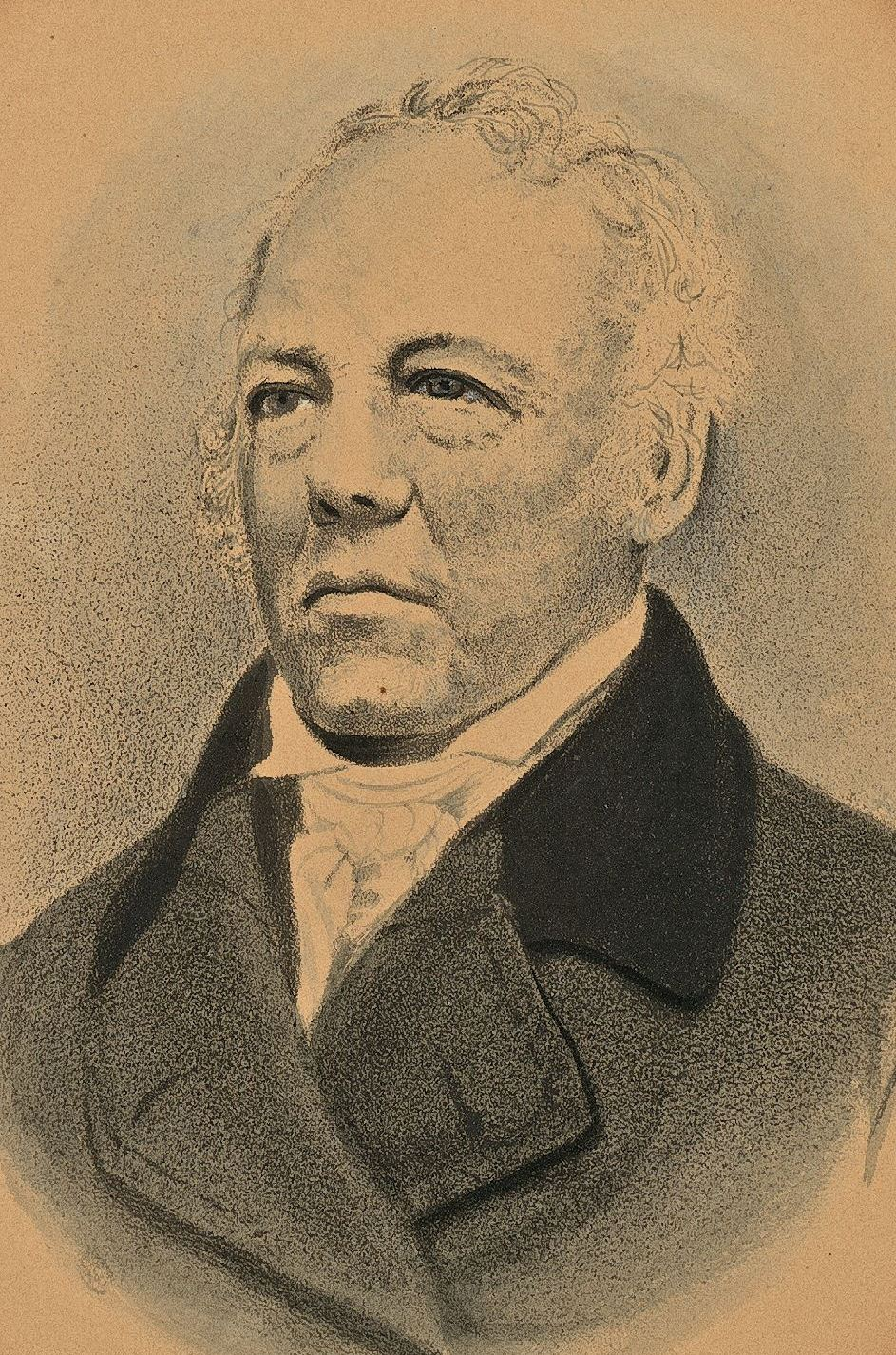

Nominee	Anson Morrill	Albion Parris	Isaac Reed
Party	Know Nothing	Democratic	Whig
Electoral vote	(Elected)
Popular vote	44,565	28,462	14,001
Percentage	49.17%	31.40%	15.45%
- County results Morrill: 30–40% 40–50% 50–60% 60–70% 70–80% Reed: 30–40%
Governor before election
William G. Crosby
Whig
Elected Governor
Anson Morrill
Know Nothing

The 1854 Maine gubernatorial election was held on September 11, 1854, in order to elect the Governor of Maine. Know Nothing nominee Anson Morrill defeated Democratic nominee and former Governor Albion Parris, Whig nominee and former member of the U.S. House of Representatives from Maine's 4th district Isaac Reed and Liberty Party nominee and former member of the U.S. House of Representatives from Maine's 4th district Shepard Cary. However, as no candidate received a majority of the total votes cast as was required by Maine law, the election was forwarded to the Maine legislature, who chose Morrill as governor.

== General election ==
On election day, September 11, 1854, Know Nothing nominee Anson Morrill won the election by a margin of 16,103 votes against his foremost opponent Democratic nominee and former Governor Albion Parris, thereby gaining Know Nothing control over the office of governor. Morrill was sworn in as the 24th Governor of Maine on January 3, 1855.

=== Results ===
Maine gubernatorial election, 1854
Party	Candidate	Votes	%
Know Nothing	Anson Morrill	44,565	49.17
Democratic	Albion Parris	28,462	31.40
Whig	Isaac Reed	14,001	15.45
Liberty	Shepard Cary	3,478	3.84
	Scattering	127	0.14
Total votes		90,633	100.00
Know Nothing gain from Whig			
