= 1855 Maine gubernatorial election =

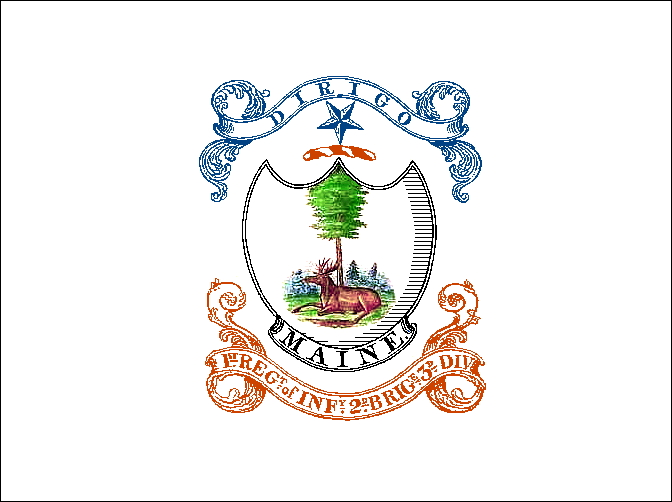
- September 10, 1855
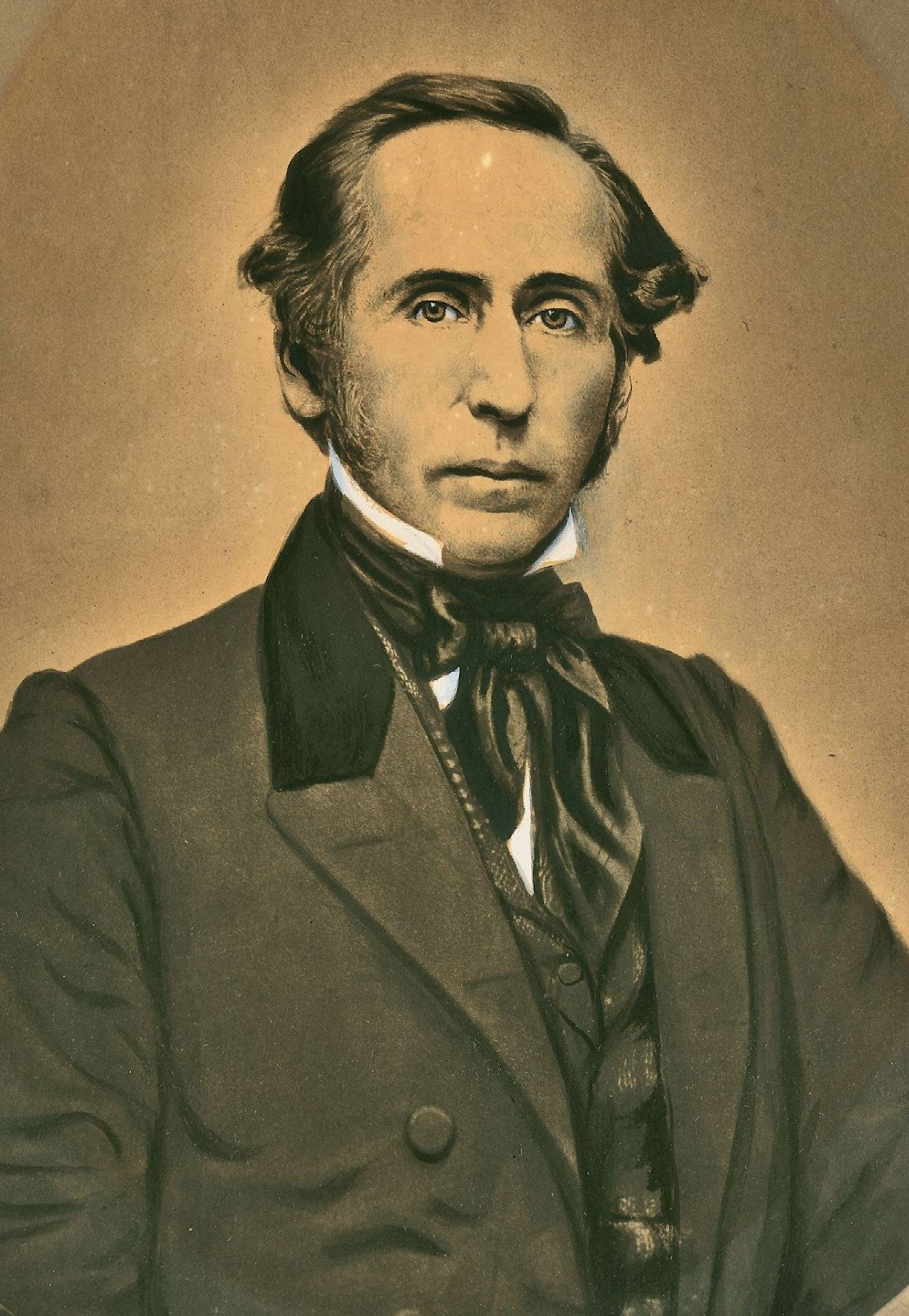

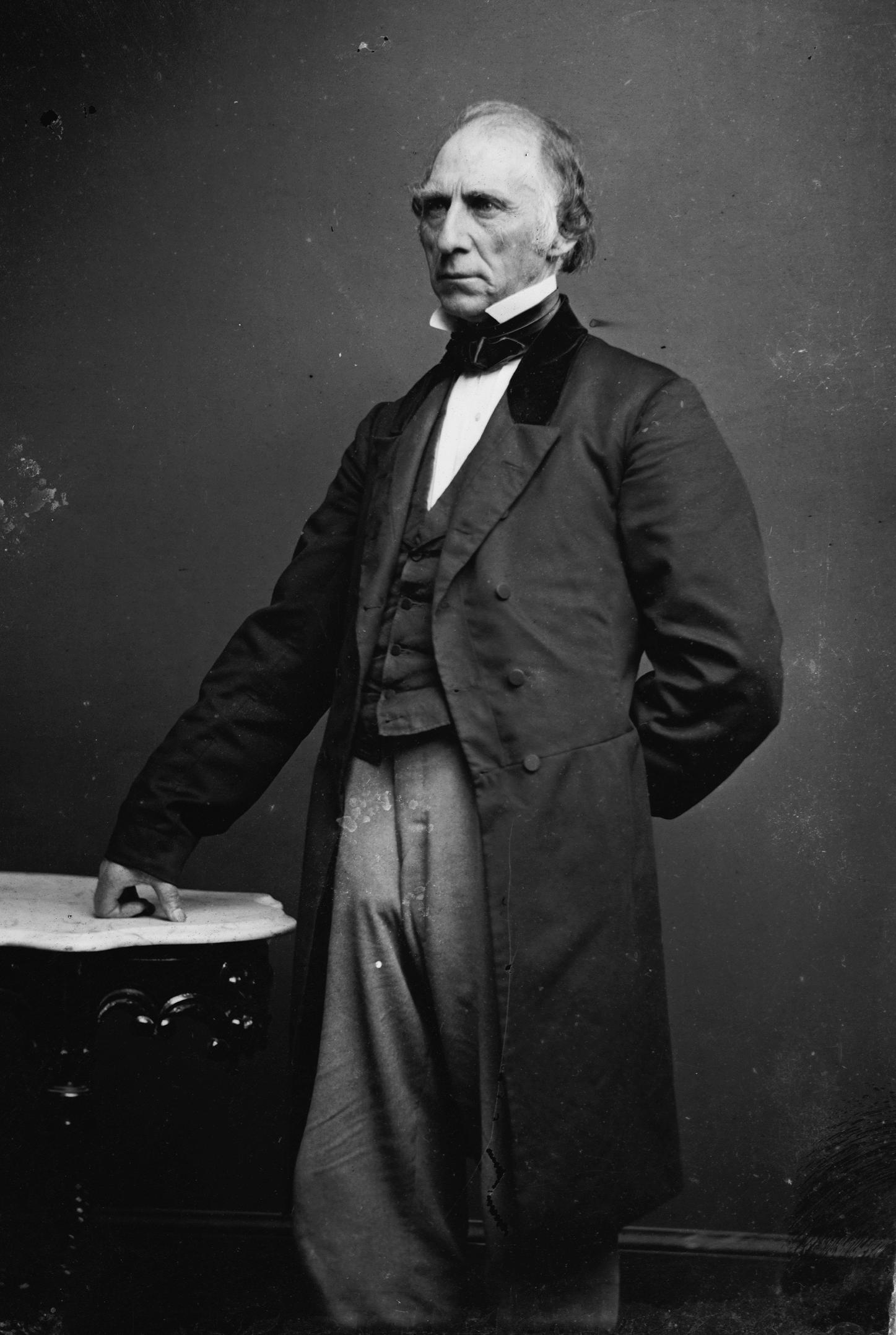

Nominee	Samuel Wells	Anson Morrill	Isaac Reed
Party	Democratic	Republican	Whig
Electoral vote	(Elected)
Popular vote	48,341	51,441	10,610
Percentage	43.76%	46.56%	9.60%
- County results Wells: 40–50% 50–60% Morrill: 30–40% 40–50% 50–60%
Governor before election
Anson Morrill
Republican
Elected Governor
Samuel Wells
Democratic

The 1855 Maine gubernatorial election was held on September 10, 1855, in order to elect the governor of Maine. Democratic nominee and former member of the Maine House of Representatives Samuel Wells defeated incumbent Republican governor Anson Morrill and Whig nominee and former member of the U.S. House of Representatives from Maine's 4th district Isaac Reed. However, as no candidate received a majority of the total votes cast as was required by Maine law, the election was forwarded to the Maine legislature, who chose Wells as governor, despite the fact he only came in second in the popular vote.

== General election ==
On election day, September 10, 1855, Democratic nominee Samuel Wells won the election despite losing the popular vote by a margin of 3,100 votes against his foremost opponent incumbent Republican governor Anson Morrill, thereby gaining Democratic control over the office of governor. Wells was sworn in as the 25th governor of Maine on January 2, 1856.

=== Results ===
Maine gubernatorial election, 1855
Party	Candidate	Votes	%
Democratic	Samuel Wells	48,341	43.76
Republican	Anson Morrill (incumbent)	51,441	46.56
Whig	Isaac Reed	10,610	9.60
	Scattering	81	0.08
Total votes		110,473	100.00
Democratic gain from Republican			
