= 1859 Maine gubernatorial election =

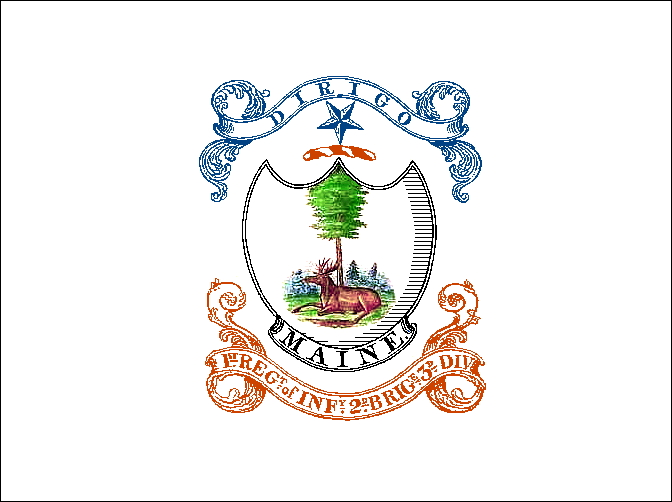
- September 12, 1859
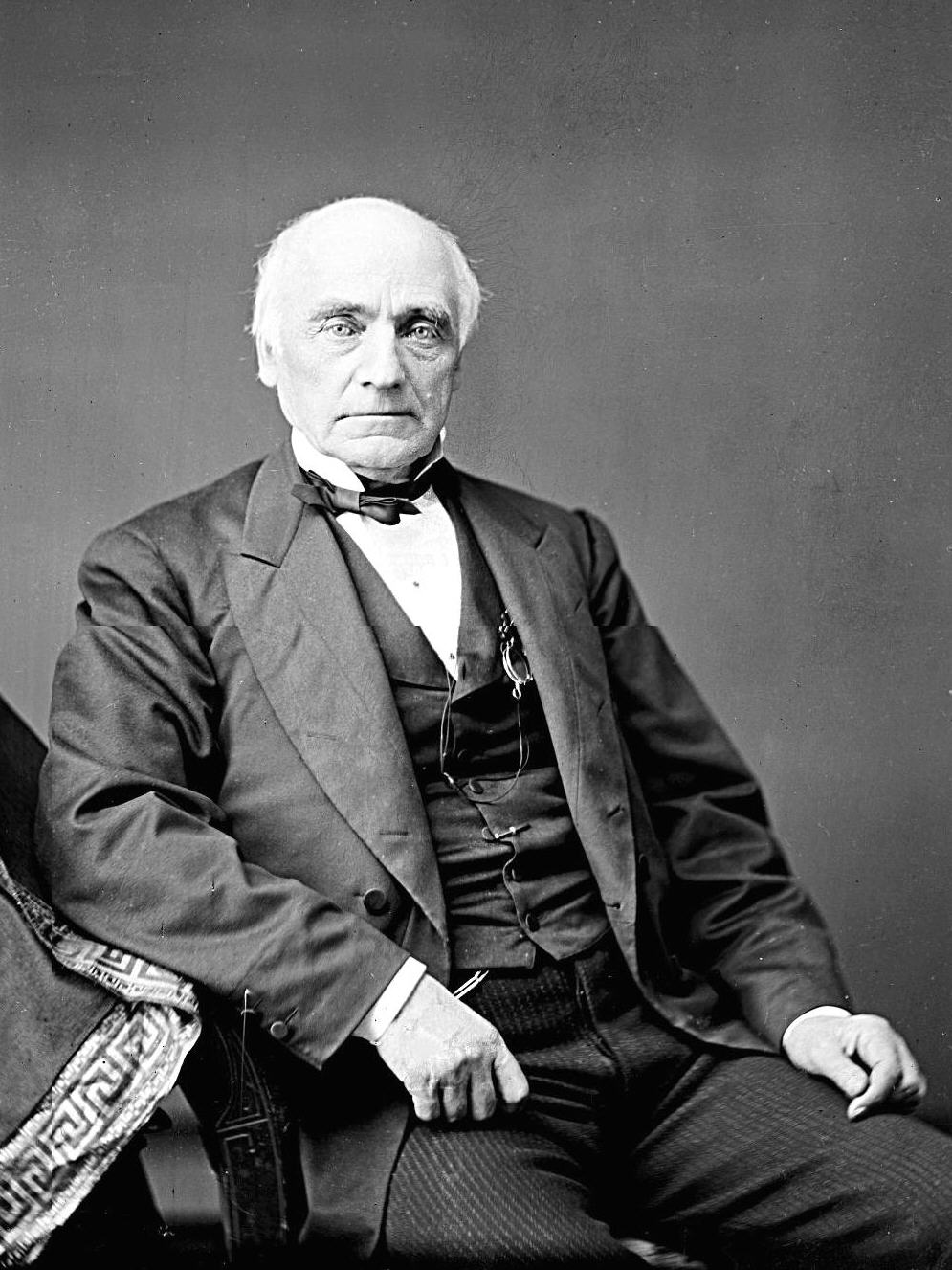

Nominee	Lot M. Morrill	Manassah H. Smith
Party	Republican	Democratic
Popular vote	57,180	45,387
Percentage	55.73%	44.24%
- County results Morrill: 50–60% 60–70% Smith: 50–60%
Governor before election
Lot M. Morrill
Republican
Elected Governor
Lot M. Morrill
Republican

The 1859 Maine gubernatorial election was held on September 12, 1859, in order to elect the governor of Maine. Incumbent Republican governor Lot M. Morrill won re-election against Democratic nominee Manassah H. Smith in a second rematch of the previous elections.

== General election ==
On election day, September 12, 1859, incumbent Republican governor Lot M. Morrill won re-election by a margin of 11,793 votes against his opponent Democratic nominee Manassah H. Smith, thereby retaining Republican control over the office of governor. Morrill was sworn in for his third term on January 6, 1860.

=== Results ===
Maine gubernatorial election, 1859
Party	Candidate	Votes	%
Republican	Lot M. Morrill (incumbent)	57,180	55.73
Democratic	Manassah H. Smith	45,387	44.24
	Scattering	35	0.03
Total votes		102,602	100.00
Republican hold			
