= 1890 Maine gubernatorial election =

- September 8, 1890
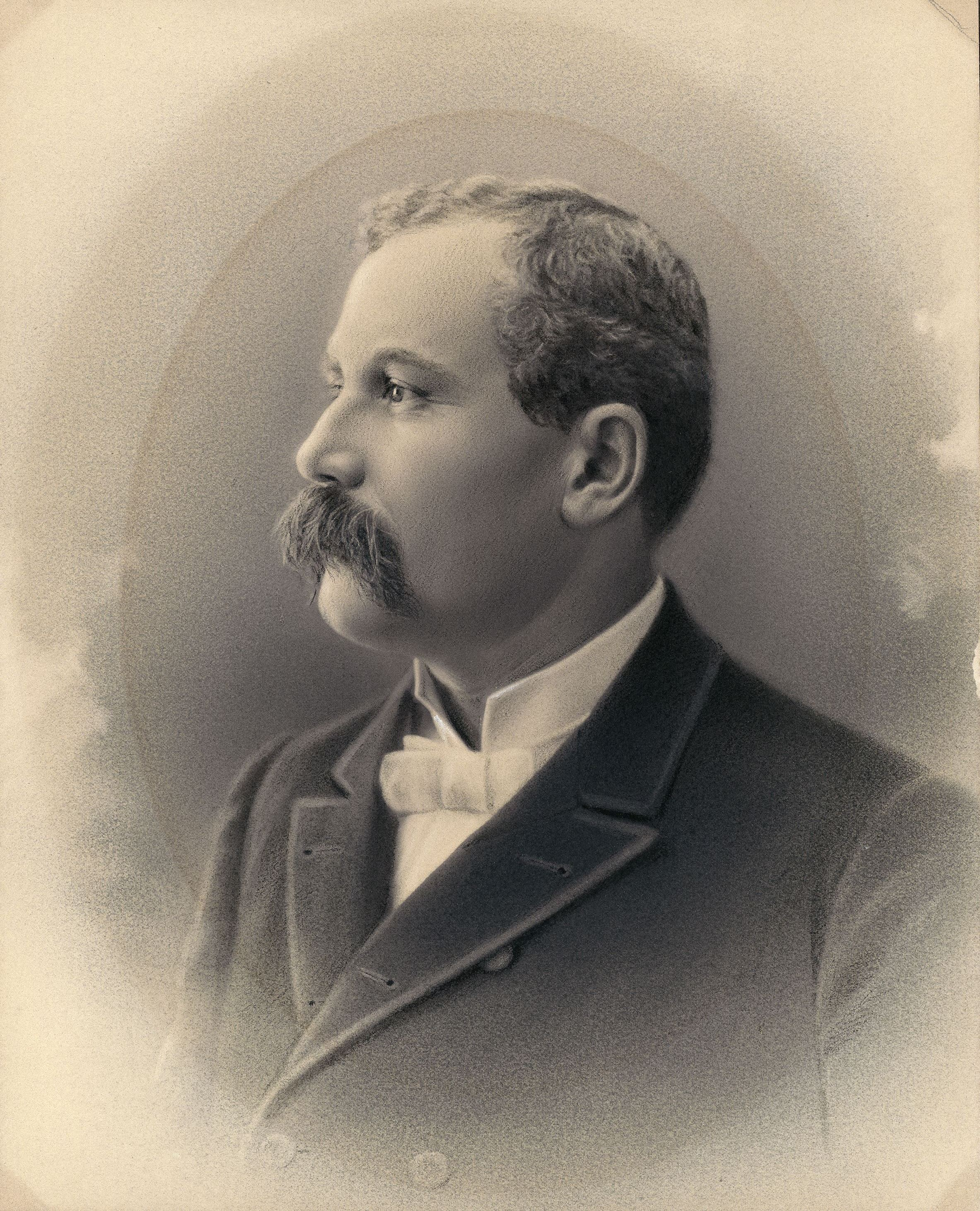

Nominee	Edwin C. Burleigh	William P. Thompson
Party	Republican	Democratic
Popular vote	64,259	45,360
Percentage	56.42%	39.82%
- County results Burleigh: 40–50% 50–60% 60–70% Thompson: 40–50%
Governor before election
Edwin C. Burleigh
Republican
Elected Governor
Edwin C. Burleigh
Republican

The 1890 Maine gubernatorial election was held on September 8, 1890, in order to elect the governor of Maine. Incumbent Republican governor Edwin C. Burleigh won re-election against Democratic nominee William P. Thompson, Prohibition nominee Aaron Clark and Labor nominee Isaac Clark.

== General election ==
On election day, September 8, 1890, incumbent Republican governor Edwin C. Burleigh won re-election by a margin of 18,899 votes against his foremost opponent Democratic nominee William P. Thompson, thereby retaining Republican control over the office of governor. Burleigh was sworn in for his second term on January 4, 1891.

=== Results ===
Maine gubernatorial election, 1890
Party	Candidate	Votes	%
Republican	Edwin C. Burleigh (incumbent)	64,259	56.42
Democratic	William P. Thompson	45,360	39.82
Prohibition	Aaron Clark	2,975	2.61
Labor	Isaac Clark	1,304	1.14
	Scattering	6	0.01
Total votes		113,904	100.00
Republican hold			
