= 1884 Maine gubernatorial election =

- September 8, 1884
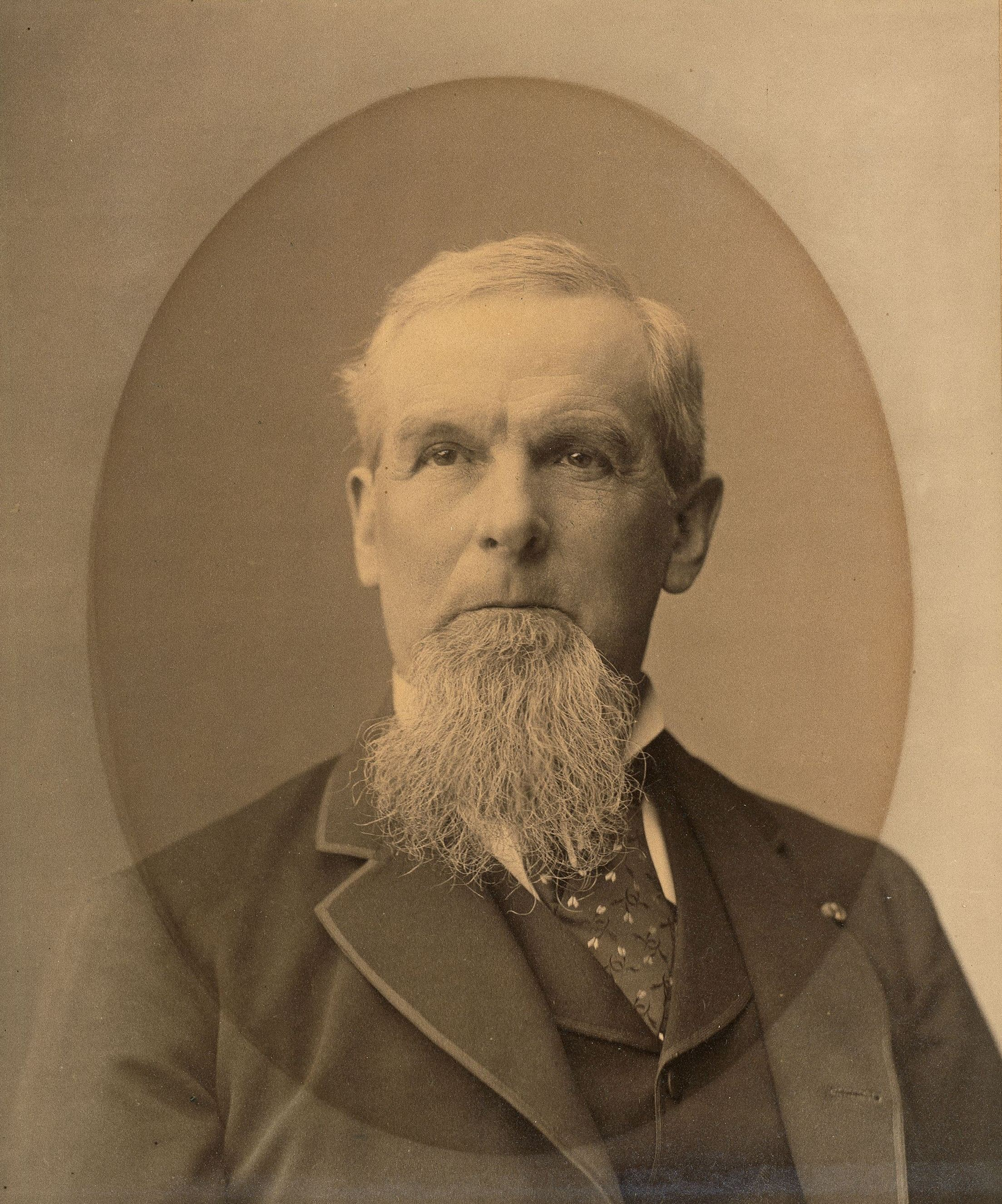

Nominee	Frederick Robie	John B. Redman
Party	Republican	Democratic
Popular vote	78,695	58,983
Percentage	55.44%	41.55%
- County results Robie: 40–50% 50–60% 60–70%
Governor before election
Frederick Robie
Republican
Elected Governor
Frederick Robie
Republican

The 1884 Maine gubernatorial election was held on September 8, 1884, in order to elect the governor of Maine. Incumbent Republican governor Frederick Robie won re-election against Democratic nominee John B. Redman, Greenback nominee Hosea B. Eaton and Prohibition nominee William T. Eustis.

== General election ==
On election day, September 8, 1884, incumbent Republican governor Frederick Robie won re-election by a margin of 19,712 votes against his foremost opponent Democratic nominee John B. Redman, thereby retaining Republican control over the office of governor. Robie was sworn in for his second term on January 5, 1885.

=== Results ===
Maine gubernatorial election, 1884
Party	Candidate	Votes	%
Republican	Frederick Robie (incumbent)	78,695	55.44
Democratic	John B. Redman	58,983	41.55
Greenback	Hosea B. Eaton	3,142	2.21
Prohibition	William T. Eustis	1,015	0.72
	Scattering	124	0.08
Total votes		141,959	100.00
Republican hold			
