= 1845 Maine gubernatorial election =

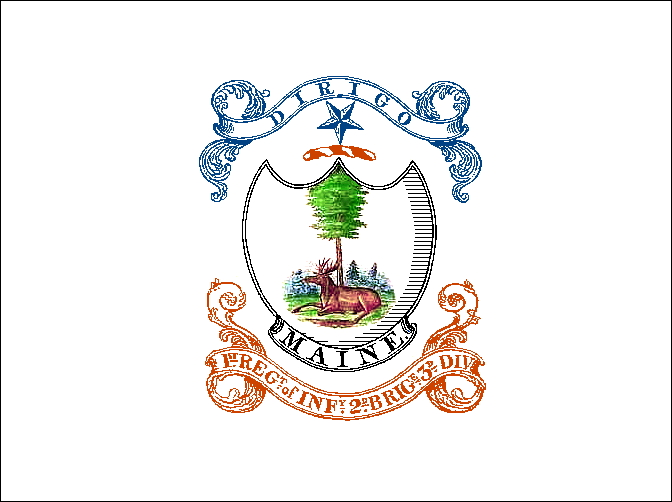
- September 8, 1845
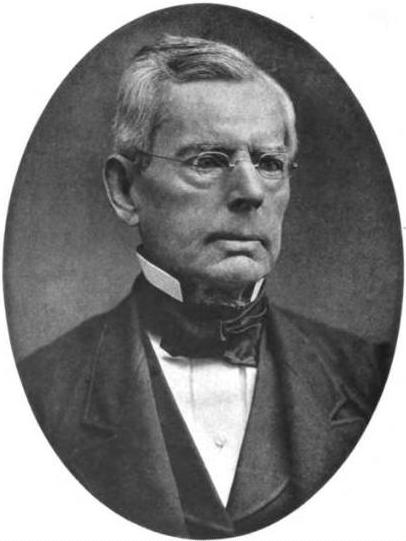

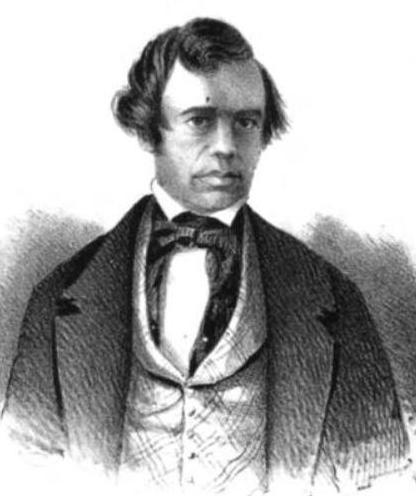

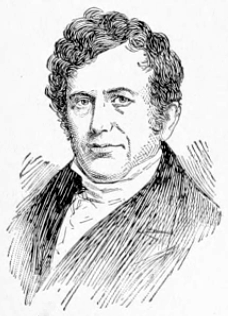
Nominee	Hugh J. Anderson	Freeman H. Morse	Samuel Fessenden
Party	Democratic	Whig	Liberty
Popular vote	34,711	26,341	5,867
Percentage	51.50%	39.08%	8.70%
- County results Anderson: 40–50% 50–60% 60–70% Morse: 40–50% 50–60%
Governor before election
Hugh J. Anderson
Democratic
Elected Governor
Hugh J. Anderson
Democratic

The 1845 Maine gubernatorial election was held on September 8, 1845, in order to elect the governor of Maine. Incumbent Democratic governor Hugh J. Anderson won re-election to a third term against Whig nominee and former U.S. Representative Freeman H. Morse and Liberty Party candidate Samuel Fessenden.

== Candidates ==
- Hugh Johnson Anderson, incumbent governor (Democrat)
- Samuel Fessenden, lawyer, abolitionist, and former member of the Massachusetts and Maine state legislatures, (Liberty)
- Freeman Harlow Morse, former U.S. Representative from Maine's 4th congressional district

== General election ==
On election day, September 8, 1845, incumbent Democratic governor Hugh J. Anderson won re-election by a margin of 8,370 votes against his foremost opponent Whig nominee Freeman H. Morse, thereby retaining Democratic control over the office of governor. Anderson was sworn in for his third term on January 5, 1846.

=== Results ===
Maine gubernatorial election, 1845
Party	Candidate	Votes	%	±%
Democratic	Hugh J. Anderson (incumbent)	34,711	51.50	▼0.65
Whig	Freeman H. Morse	26,341	39.08	▼1.94
Liberty	Samuel Fessenden	5,867	8.70	▲2.05
Write-in		486	0.72	▲0.54
Total votes		67,405	100.00	▼28.26
Democratic hold				
