= 1892 Maine gubernatorial election =

- September 12, 1892
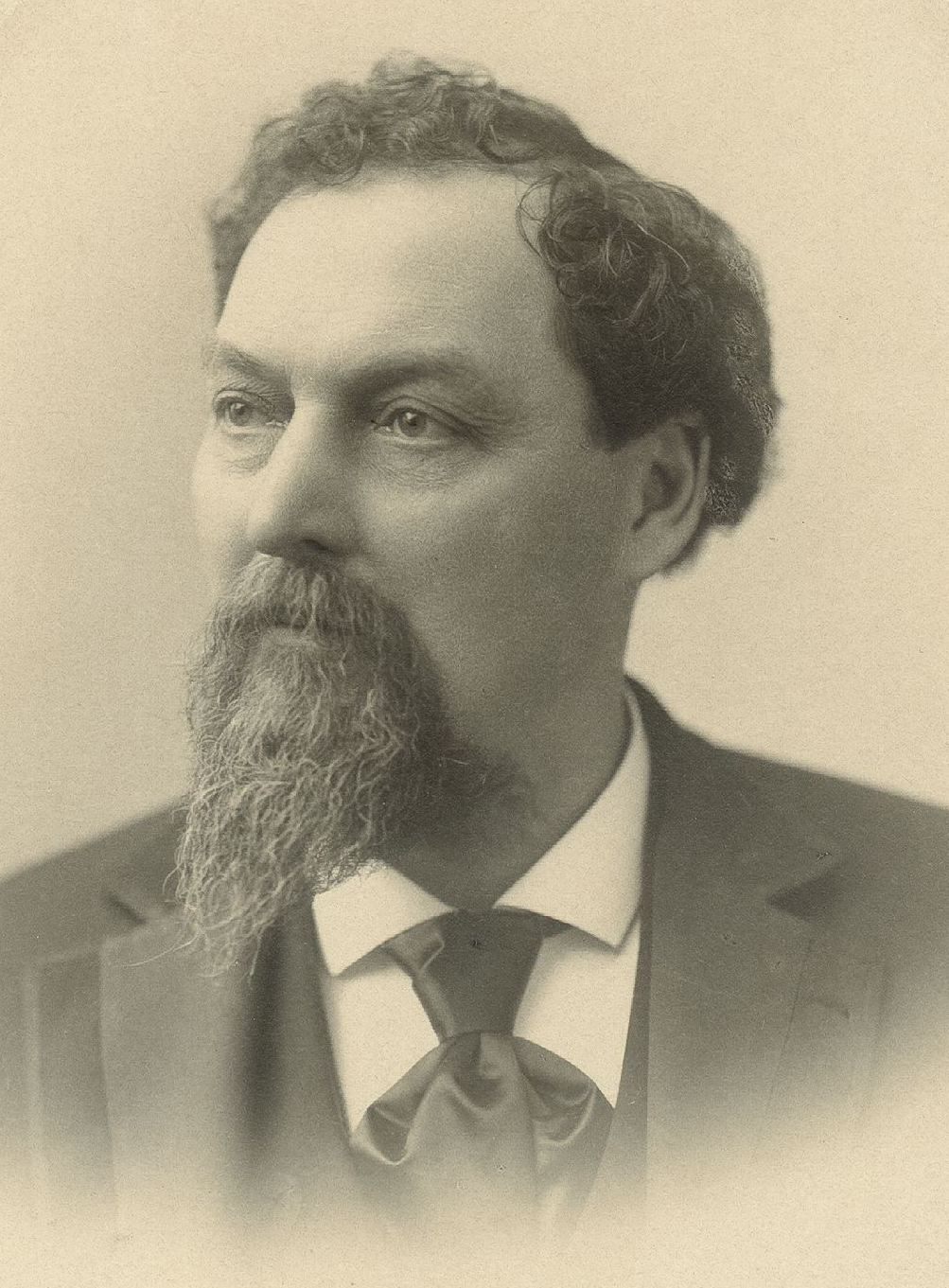

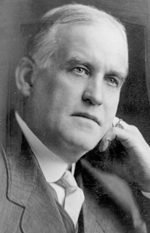
Nominee	Henry B. Cleaves	Charles F. Johnson
Party	Republican	Democratic
Popular vote	67,900	55,397
Percentage	52.13%	42.53%
- County results Cleaves: 40–50% 50–60%
Governor before election
Edwin C. Burleigh
Republican
Elected Governor
Henry B. Cleaves
Republican

The 1892 Maine gubernatorial election was held on September 12, 1892, in order to elect the Governor of Maine. Republican nominee and former Attorney General of Maine Henry B. Cleaves defeated Democratic nominee Charles F. Johnson, Prohibition nominee Timothy B. Hussey, Populist nominee Luther C. Bateman and Labor nominee E. F. Knowlton.

== General election ==
On election day, September 12, 1892, Republican nominee Henry B. Cleaves won the election by a margin of 12,503 votes against his foremost opponent Democratic nominee Charles F. Johnson, thereby retaining Republican control over the office of governor. Cleaves was sworn in as the 43th Governor of Maine on January 4, 1893.

=== Results ===
Maine gubernatorial election, 1892
Party	Candidate	Votes	%
Republican	Henry B. Cleaves	67,900	52.13
Democratic	Charles F. Johnson	55,397	42.53
Prohibition	Timothy B. Hussey	3,864	2.97
Populist	Luther C. Bateman	2,888	2.22
Labor	E. F. Knowlton	201	0.15
Total votes		130,250	100.00
Republican hold			
