= 1846 Maine gubernatorial election =

- September 14, 1846
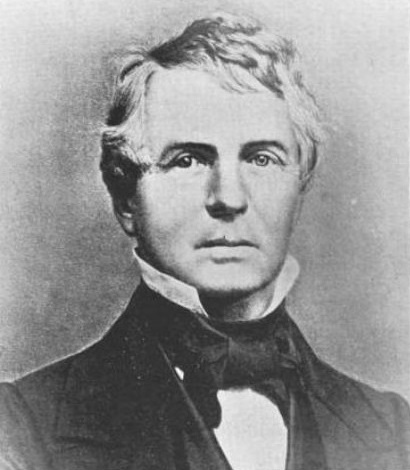

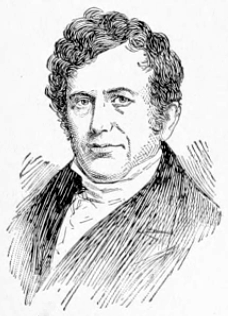
Nominee	John W. Dana	David Bronson	Samuel Fessenden
Party	Democratic	Whig	Liberty
Electoral vote	(Elected)
Popular vote	36,031	29,557	9,398
Percentage	47.62%	39.06%	12.42%
- County results Dana: 40–50% 50–60% 60–70% Bronson: 40–50% 50–60%
Governor before election
Hugh J. Anderson
Democratic
Elected Governor
John W. Dana
Democratic

The 1846 Maine gubernatorial election was held on September 14, 1846, in order to elect the Governor of Maine. Former acting governor and Democratic nominee John W. Dana defeated the Whig nominee, State Senator David Bronson, and Liberty Party candidate Samuel Fessenden. However, as no candidate received a majority of the total votes cast as was required by Maine law, the election was forwarded to the Maine legislature, who chose Dana as governor.

== Candidates ==
- David Bronson, state senator, former U.S. Representative from Maine's 4th district, former member of the Maine House of Representatives (Whig)
- John Winchester Dana, former president of the Maine Senate and acting governor for a day in 1844 (Democrat)
- Samuel Fessenden, lawyer, abolitionist, and former member of the Massachusetts and Maine state legislatures, nominee for governor in 1845 (Liberty)

== General election ==
On election day, September 14, 1846, former Democratic acting governor John W. Dana won the election by a margin of 6,474 votes against his foremost opponent Whig nominee David Bronson, thereby retaining Democratic control over the office of governor. Dana was sworn in as the 21st governor of Maine on May 12, 1847.

=== Results ===
Maine gubernatorial election, 1846
Party	Candidate	Votes	%	±%
Democratic	John W. Dana	36,031	47.62	▼3.88
Whig	David Bronson	29,557	39.06	▼0.02
Liberty	Samuel Fessenden	9,398	12.42	▲3.72
Write-in		678	0.90	▲0.18
Total votes		75,664	100.00	▲12.25
Democratic hold				
