= 1844 Maine gubernatorial election =

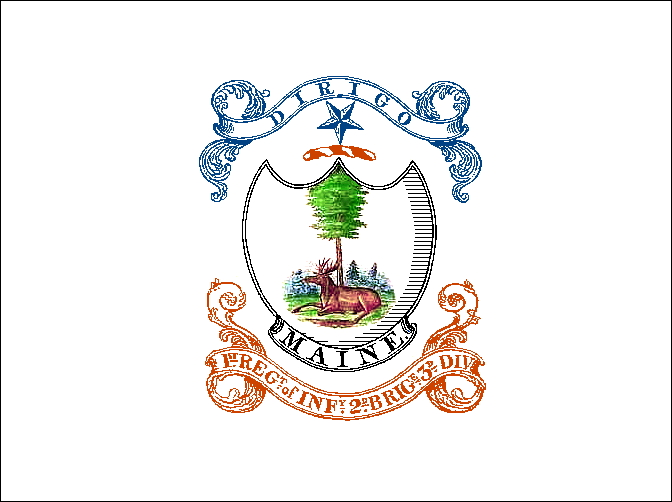
- September 9, 1844
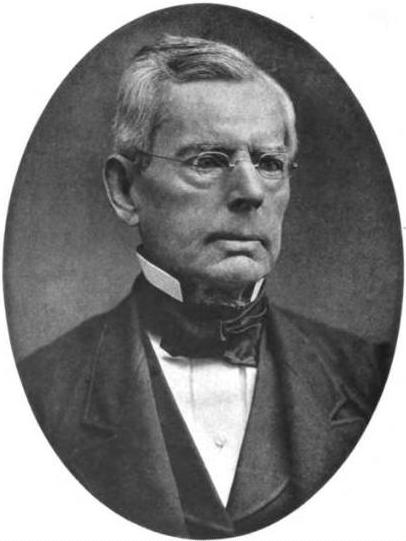

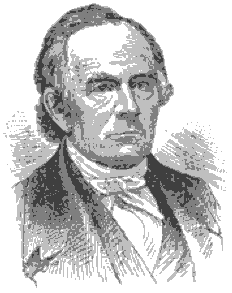
Nominee	Hugh J. Anderson	Edward Robinson	James Appleton
Party	Democratic	Whig	Liberty
Popular vote	48,942	38,501	6,245
Percentage	52.15%	41.02%	6.65%
- County results Anderson: 40–50% 50–60% 60–70% Robinson: 40–50% 50–60%
Governor before election
Hugh J. Anderson
Democratic
Elected Governor
Hugh J. Anderson
Democratic

The 1844 Maine gubernatorial election was held on September 9, 1844, in order to elect the governor of Maine. Incumbent Democratic governor Hugh J. Anderson won re-election in a repeat of the previous election against Whig nominee and former U.S. Representative Edward Robinson and Liberty Party candidate and former member of the Maine House of Representatives James Appleton.

== Candidates ==
- Hugh Johnson Anderson, incumbent governor, former U.S. representative from Maine's 6th district, former clerk of Waldo County Courts (Democrat)
- James Appleton, nominee for governor in 1842 and 1843, former vice president of the American Anti-Slavery Society, former member of the Maine and Massachusetts state legislatures (Liberty)
- Edward Robinson, nominee for governor in 1842 and 1843, former U.S. representative from Maine's 3rd congressional district, former Maine state senator (Whig)

== General election ==
On election day, September 9, 1844, incumbent Democratic governor Hugh J. Anderson won re-election by a margin of 10,441 votes against his foremost opponent Whig nominee Edward Robinson, thereby retaining Democratic control over the office of governor. Anderson was sworn in for his second term on January 5, 1845.

=== Results ===
Maine gubernatorial election, 1844
Party	Candidate	Votes	%	±%
Democratic	Hugh J. Anderson (incumbent)	48,942	52.15	▲1.90
Whig	Edward Robinson	38,501	41.02	▲8.12
Liberty	James Appleton	6,245	6.65	▼3.93
Write-in		165	0.18	▼1.04
Total votes		93,853	100.00	▲47.23
Democratic hold				
