= Ezekiel Holmes =

American agriculturalist and politician

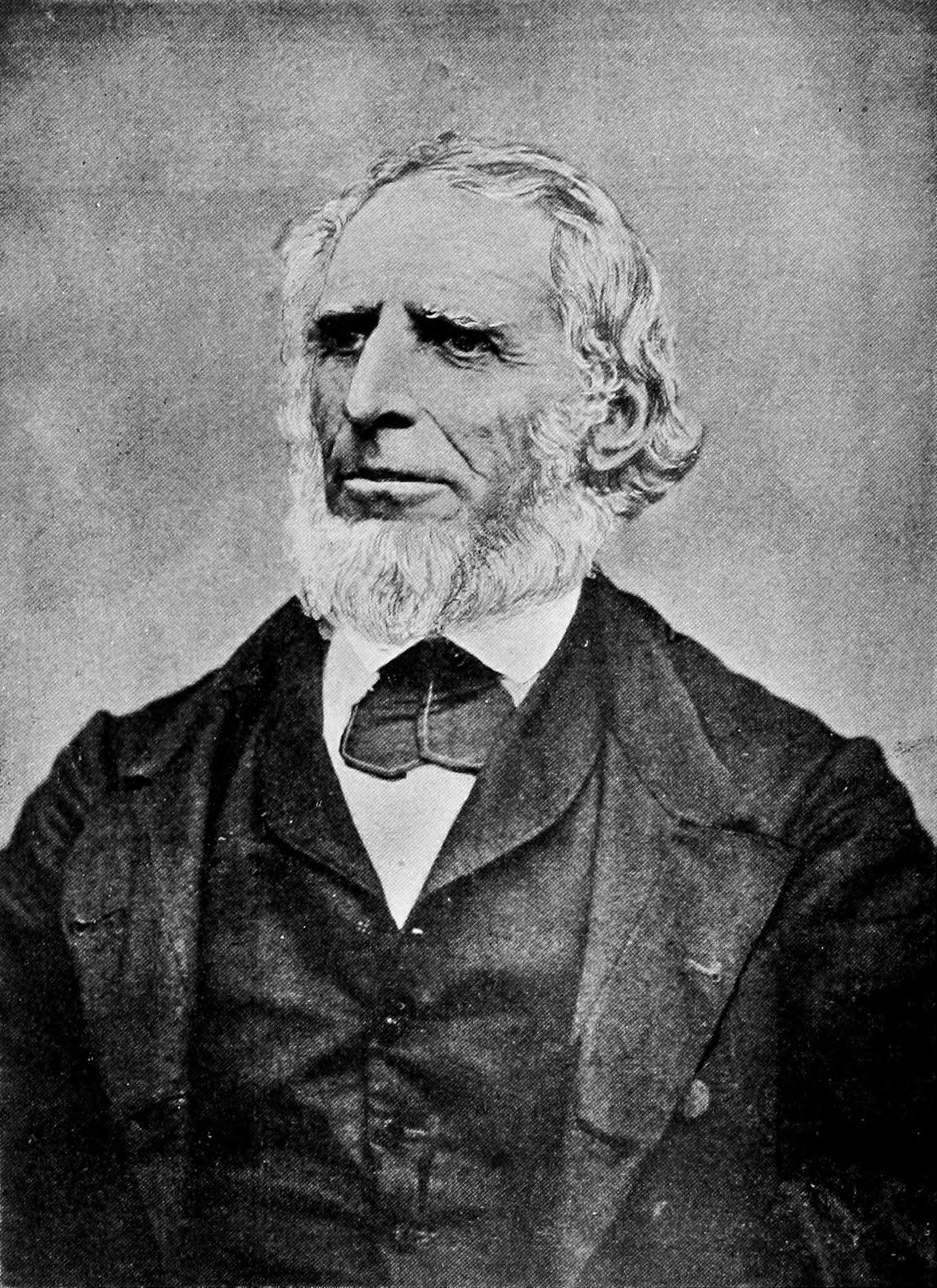
Ezekiel Holmes, aged 64

Ezekiel Holmes (August 21, 1801 – February 9, 1865) was an American agriculturalist and politician known as the "father of Maine agriculture". Holmes secured the establishment of the University of Maine as an independent institution located in Orono, Maine. Holmes Hall on their campus is named in his honor

In 1821, as a student at Brown University, he and friend Elijah Hamlin discovered the first tournalines in Maine, which opened up a rich gemstone mining industry in the state. He graduated from Brown and went on to receive his M.D. from Bowdoin College in 1824. From 1833 to 1837 he held the post of lecturer on chemistry, mineralogy, geology, and botany at Waterville College, later named Colby College.

Holmes served four consecutive single-year terms in the Maine House of Representatives from 1836 to 1840. He served two single year terms in the Maine Senate in 1844 and 1845 before returning to the House for two terms in 1851 and 1852. He was the nominee of the Liberty Party for governor in 1853 and 1854. He lost to Whig William G. Crosby both times.

Holmes was born in Kingston, Massachusetts in 1801 and died in Winthrop, Maine in 1865.

Party political offices
Preceded by George F. Talbot	Free Soil nominee for Governor of Maine; 1852, 1853	Succeeded by None
