= 1823 Maine gubernatorial election =

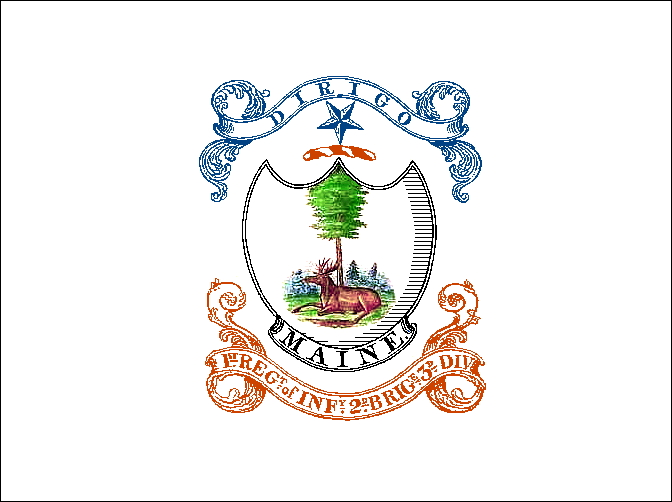
- September 8, 1823
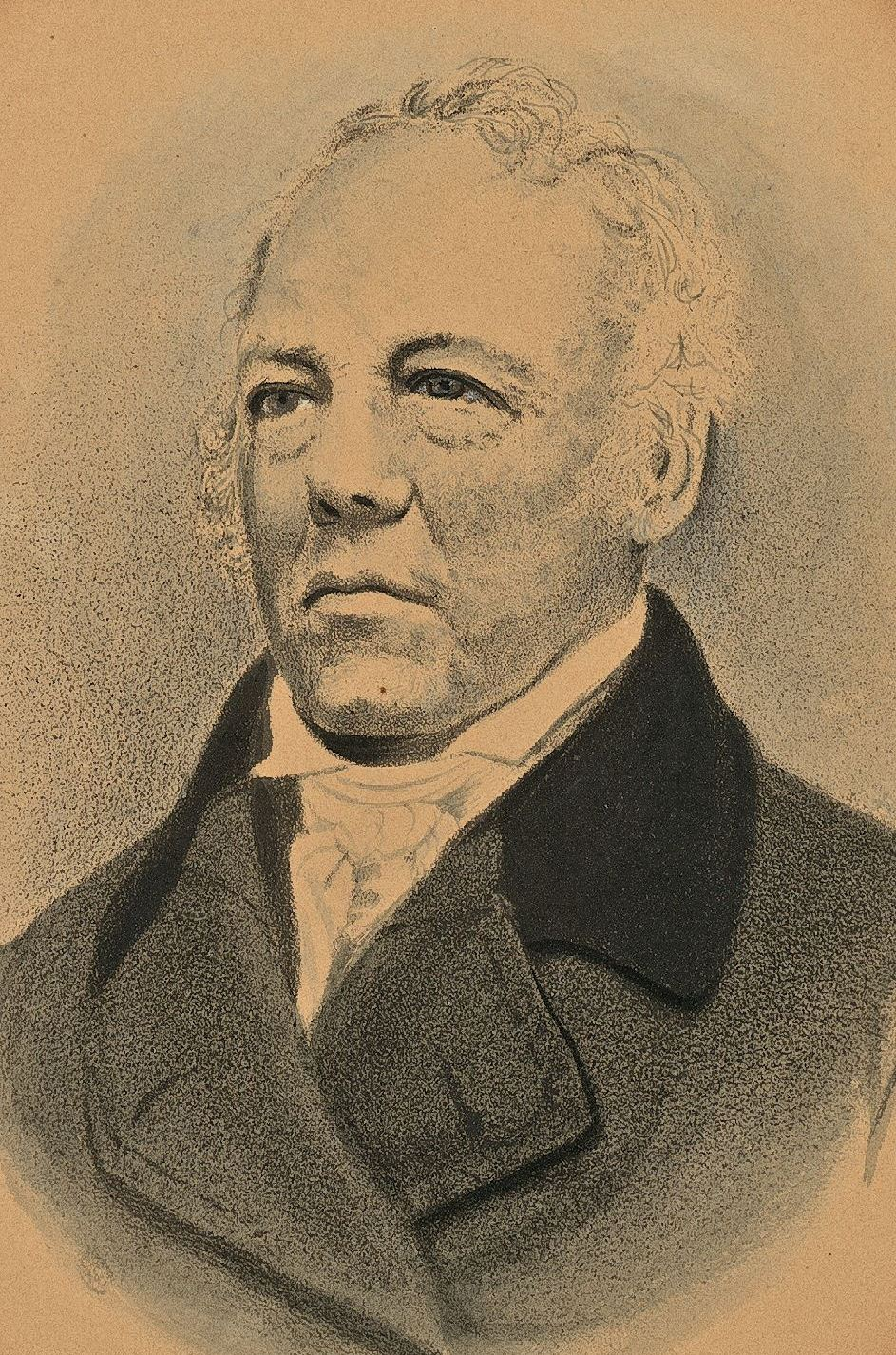
Nominee	Albion Parris
Party	Democratic-Republican
Popular vote	18,550
Percentage	95.62%
- County results Parris: 80–90% 90–100%
Governor before election
Albion Parris
Democratic-Republican
Elected Governor
Albion Parris
Democratic-Republican

The 1823 Maine gubernatorial election took place on September 8, 1823. Incumbent Democratic-Republican Governor Albion Parris won re-election to a third term. He faced no opposition.

== Results ==
1823 Maine gubernatorial election
Party	Candidate	Votes	%
Democratic-Republican	Albion Parris (incumbent)	18,550	95.62%
Write-in		850	4.38%
Majority		17,700	91.24%
Total votes		19,400	100.00%
Democratic-Republican hold			
