= 1857 Maine gubernatorial election =

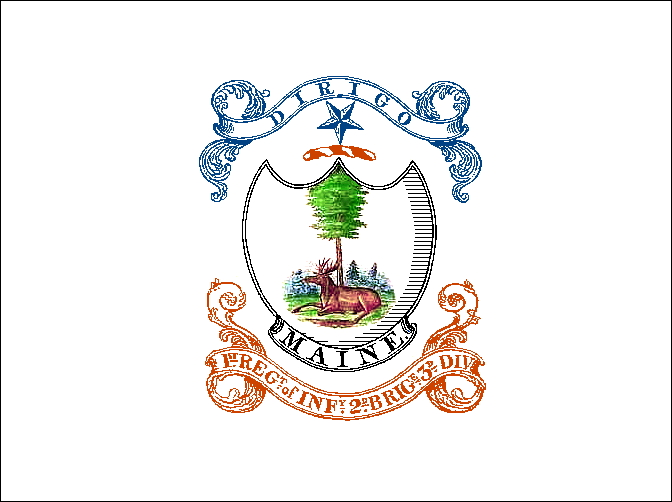
- September 14, 1857
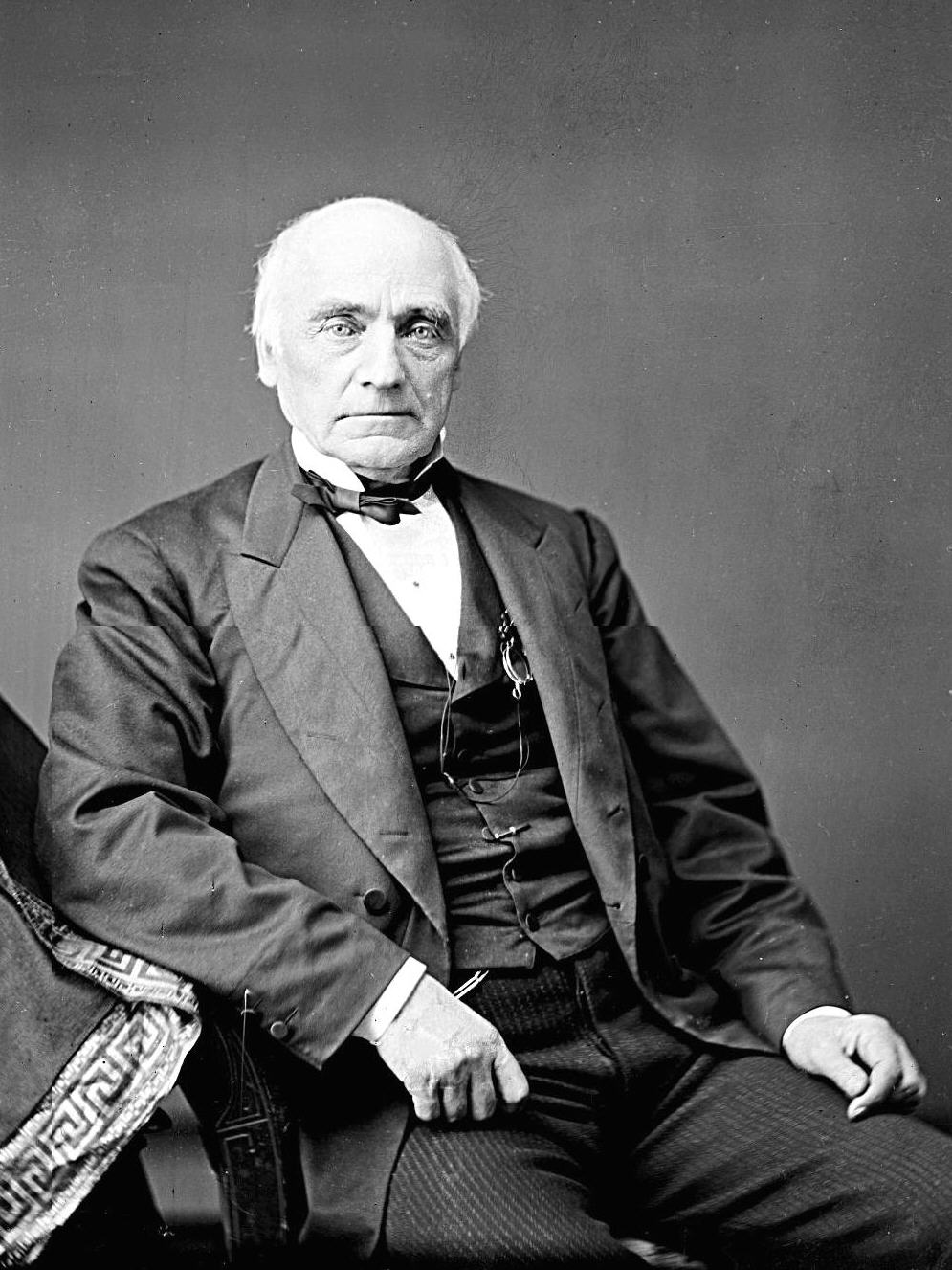

Nominee	Lot M. Morrill	Manassah H. Smith
Party	Republican	Democratic
Popular vote	54,655	42,968
Percentage	55.84%	43.90%
- County results Morrill: 50–60% 60–70% Smith: 50–60%
Governor before election
Joseph H. Williams (Acting)
Republican
Elected Governor
Lot M. Morrill
Republican

The 1857 Maine gubernatorial election was held on September 14, 1857, in order to elect the Governor of Maine. Republican nominee Lot M. Morrill defeated Democratic nominee Manassah H. Smith.

== General election ==
On election day, September 14, 1857, Republican nominee Lot M. Morrill won the election by a margin of 11,687 votes against his opponent Democratic nominee Manassah H. Smith, thereby retaining Republican control over the office of governor. Morrill was sworn in as the 28th Governor of Maine on January 6, 1858.

=== Results ===
Maine gubernatorial election, 1857
Party	Candidate	Votes	%
Republican	Lot M. Morrill	54,655	55.84
Democratic	Manassah H. Smith	42,968	43.90
	Scattering	255	0.26
Total votes		97,878	100.00
Republican hold			
