= David Bronson =

American politician (1800–1863)

Member of the U.S. House of Representatives from Maine's 4th district
- In office May 31, 1841 – March 3, 1843
- Preceded by: George Evans
- Succeeded by: Freeman H. Morse

Member of the Maine Senate
- In office 1846–1846

Member of the Maine House of Representatives

Personal details
- Born: February 8, 1800 Suffield, Connecticut, U.S.
- Died: November 20, 1863 (aged 63) St. Michaels, Maryland, U.S.
- Party: Whig
- Education: Dartmouth College, 1819
- Profession: Attorney

David Bronson (February 8, 1800 – November 20, 1863) was a United States representative from Maine. Born in Suffield, Connecticut, he graduated from Dartmouth College in 1819. He studied law, was admitted to the bar in 1823 and commenced practice in North Anson, Maine.

He was elected a member of the Maine House of Representatives, and was elected as a Whig to the Twenty-seventh Congress to fill the vacancy caused by the resignation of George Evans. He served from May 31, 1841, to March 3, 1843. He moved to Augusta and resumed the practice of law. Bronson was elected a member of the Maine State Senate in 1846.

He moved to Bath and served as collector of customs. He was judge of probate for Sagadahoc County. He was an unsuccessful candidate for election in 1856 to the Thirty-fifth Congress. Bronson died in St. Michaels, Maryland.

Party political offices
Preceded by Freeman H. Morse	Whig nominee for Governor of Maine; 1846, 1847	Succeeded by Elijah Hamlin
U.S. House of Representatives
Preceded by George Evans	Member of the U.S. House of Representatives from Maine's 4th congressional district May 31, 1841–March 3, 1843	Succeeded by Freeman H. Morse
