= Samuel Wells =

American judge

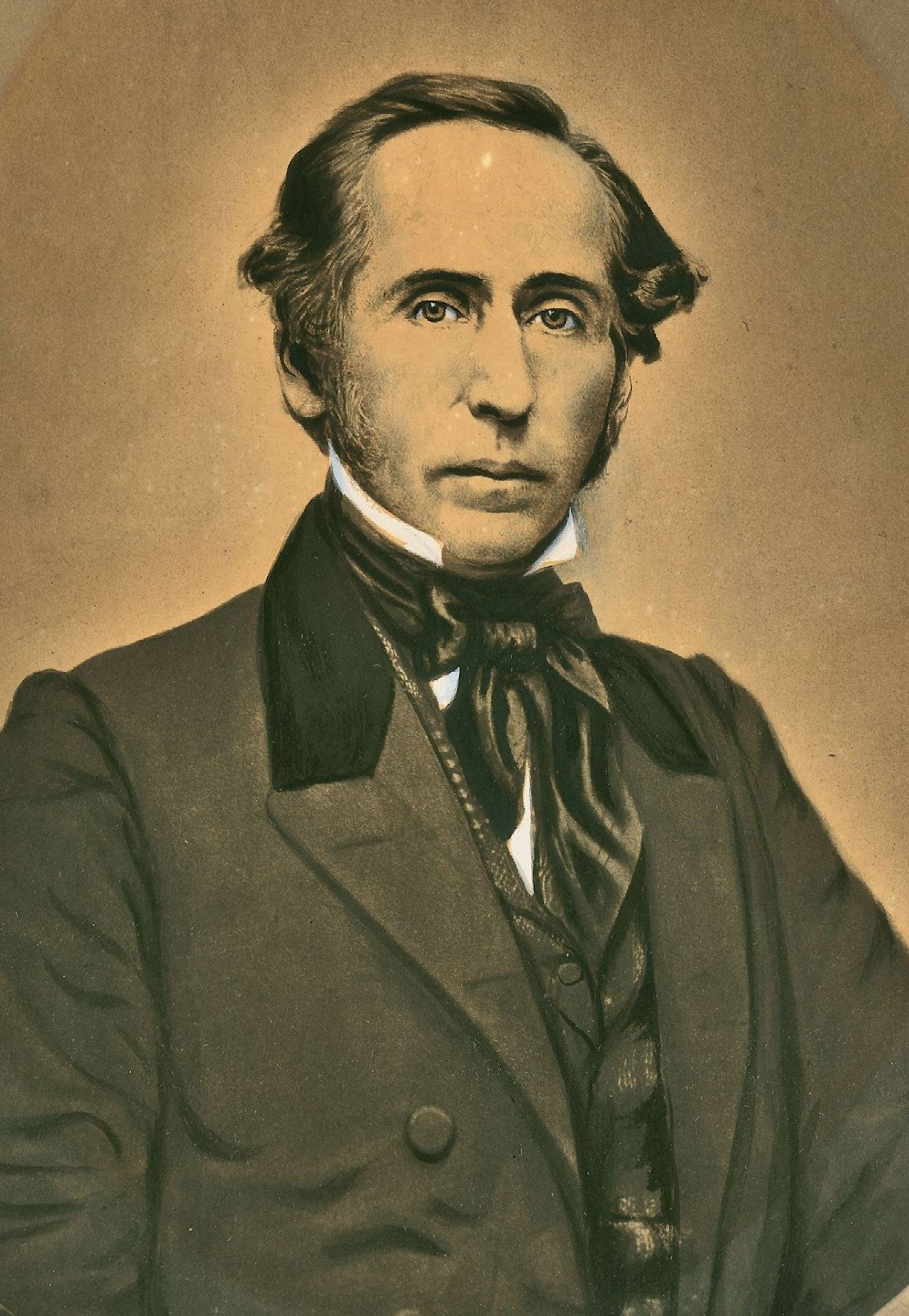

25th Governor of Maine
- In office January 3, 1856 – January 8, 1857
- Preceded by: Anson Morrill
- Succeeded by: Hannibal Hamlin

Member of the Maine House of Representatives
- In office 1836–1840

Personal details
- Born: August 15, 1801 Durham, New Hampshire, U.S.
- Died: July 15, 1868 (aged 66) Boston, Massachusetts, U.S.
- Party: Republican
- Spouse: Ann Louisa Appleton
- Children: Samuel Wells (1836–1908)
- Profession: lawyer

Samuel Wells (August 15, 1801 – July 15, 1868) was an American politician and the 25th governor of Maine.

== Biography ==
Samuel Wells was born in Durham, New Hampshire on August 15, 1801. He was educated at local schools, studied law, and was admitted to the bar.

Wells had a successful career as an attorney in Maine, living successively in Waterville, Hallowell, and Portland. He served in the Maine House of Representatives from 1836 to 1840. Wells was an associate justice of the Maine Supreme Judicial Court from 1847 to 1854.

A Democrat, Wells became Governor of Maine in 1856, chosen by the state legislature after none of the candidates in a three-way race obtained the popular vote majority required by law.

He was unsuccessful in his re-election bid and left office on January 8, 1857. After leaving office, he moved to Boston and practiced law.

He died in Boston on July 15, 1868. Wells was buried at Evergreen Cemetery in Portland.

== Sources ==
Party political offices
Preceded by Albion Parris	Democratic nominee for Governor of Maine; 1855, 1856	Succeeded by Manassah H. Smith
Political offices
Preceded by Anson Morrill	Governor of Maine; 1856–1857	Succeeded by Hannibal Hamlin
