= Henry B. Cleaves =

American politician

Henry Bradstreet Cleaves
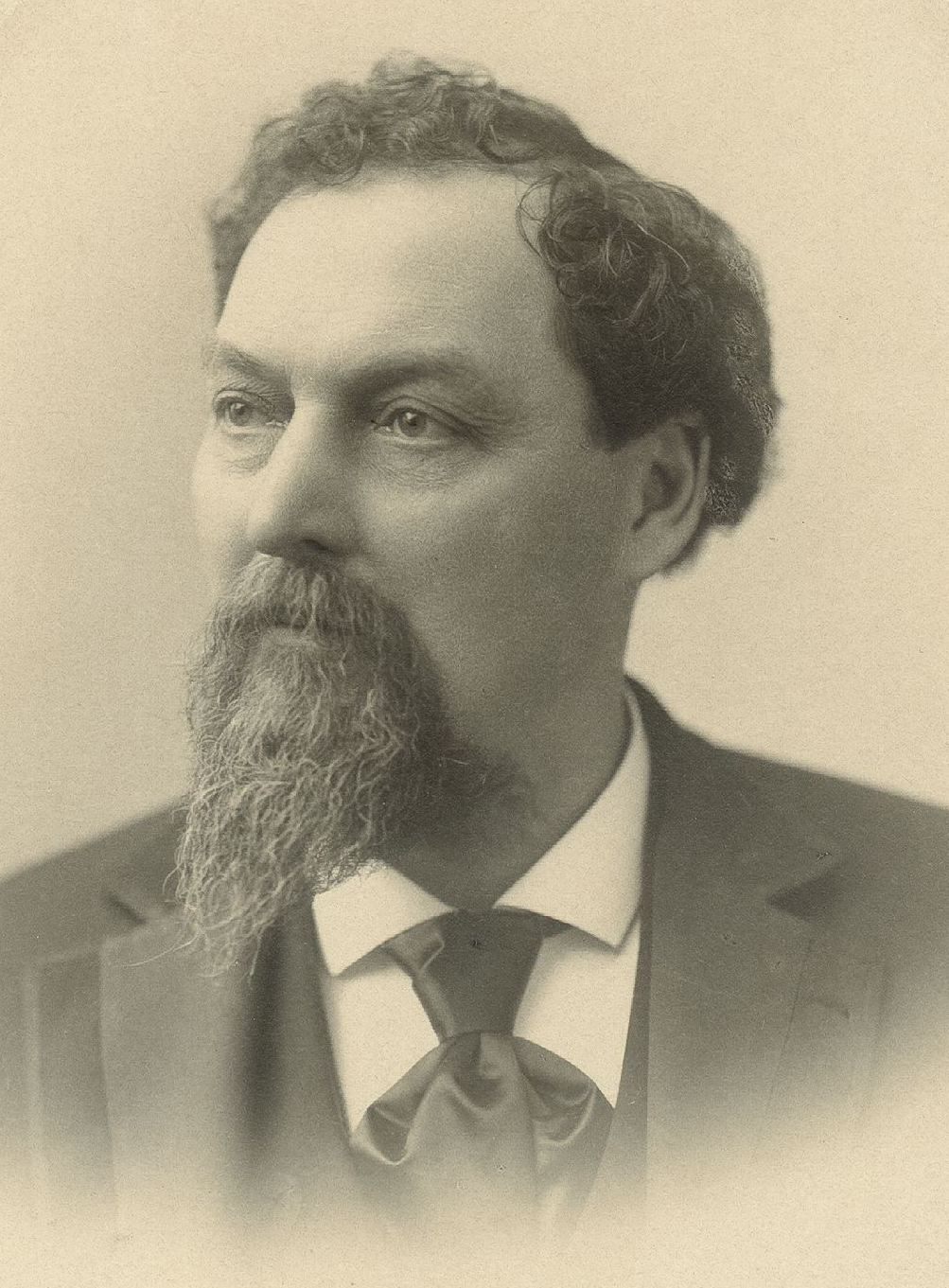

43rd Governor of Maine
- In office January 4, 1893 – January 2, 1897
- Preceded by: Edwin C. Burleigh
- Succeeded by: Llewellyn Powers

Attorney General of Maine
- In office 1880–1884
- Governor: Daniel F. Davis
- Preceded by: William H. McLellan
- Succeeded by: Orville D. Baker

Member of the Maine House of Representatives
- In office 1876–1877

Personal details
- Born: February 6, 1840 Bridgton, Maine, U.S.
- Died: June 22, 1912 (aged 72) Portland, Maine, U.S.
- Party: Republican

Military service
- Allegiance: United States of America; Union
- Branch/service: Union Army
- Years of service: 1862 – 1863
- Rank: Second Lieutenant
- Unit: 23rd Maine Volunteer Infantry Regiment
- Battles/wars: American Civil War

Henry Bradstreet Cleaves (February 6, 1840 – June 22, 1912) was an American politician and the 43rd governor of Maine from 1893 to 1897.

== Early life ==
Cleaves was born in Bridgton, Maine, on February 6, 1840, to Thomas Cleaves and Sophia Bradstreet Cleaves. He had 4 siblings, including future judge Nathan. He studied at local schools and Bridgton Academy.

== American Civil War ==
Cleaves served during the American Civil War. He enlisted in the summer of 1862, as a private soldier in Company B, 23d Maine Volunteers, under Col. William Wirt Virgin, later a justice of the Supreme Judicial Court of Maine. Cleaves attained the rank of lieutenant by time he was mustered out of service.

== Politics ==
After the Civil War, he returned to Bridgton and was involved in his family's farm as well as in the lumber business. In 1868, he began studying law and he was admitted to the bar in September 1869. He had a successful legal career in Portland, Maine.

Cleaves was elected to the Maine House of Representatives in 1876 and again in 1877 as a representative from Portland. He was chosen as chair of the House Judiciary Committee. Leaving the Legislature, he then served as the city solicitor for Portland (1877–1879), and as the Maine Attorney General from 1880 to 1884. At the 1892 Maine Republican Party convention held in Portland, he was unanimously selected as the Party's nominee for governor. He was elected in the September 1892 general election by a popular vote and was sworn in as governor on January 4, 1893. He won the re-election in 1894. During his administration, problems resulting from the national economic depression in 1893 were dealt with. He left office on January 2, 1897.

Cleaves died on June 22, 1912, at the age of 72. He is buried in the Cleaves family plot near the grave of his brother Nathan.

Party political offices
Preceded by Edwin C. Burleigh	Republican nominee for Governor of Maine; 1892, 1894	Succeeded by Llewellyn Powers
Legal offices
Preceded by William H. McLellan	Maine Attorney General; 1880–1884	Succeeded by Orville D. Baker
Political offices
Preceded by Edwin C. Burleigh	Governor of Maine; 1893–1897	Succeeded by Llewellyn Powers
