= William G. Crosby =

American politician (1805–1881)

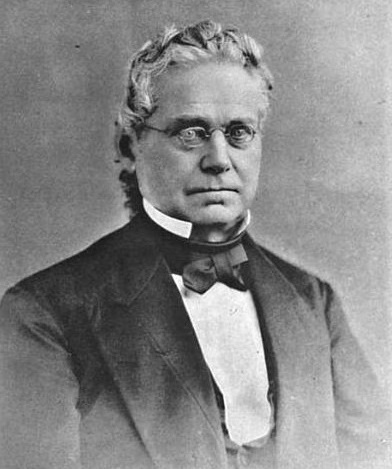

23rd Governor of Maine
- In office January 5, 1853 – January 3, 1855
- Preceded by: John Hubbard
- Succeeded by: Anson Morrill

Personal details
- Born: September 10, 1805 Belfast, Massachusetts (now Maine)
- Died: March 21, 1881 (aged 75) Belfast, Maine, US
- Party: Whig
- Profession: Attorney

William George Crosby (September 10, 1805 – March 21, 1881) was an American politician and the 23rd governor of Maine. A Whig, Crosby served two single-year terms as governor from 1853 to 1855.

== Early life ==
Crosby was born in Belfast (in modern-day Maine, then a part of Massachusetts) on September 10, 1805. He studied at Belfast Academy and then Phillips Academy in Andover, Massachusetts. He graduated from Bowdoin College in 1823, and his classmates included William Pitt Fessenden, with whom he remained friendly until Fessenden's death in 1869. He then studied law with his father, Judge William Crosby, was admitted to the bar, and practiced in Boston. He returned to Belfast two years later to become his father's law partner. In 1831, Crosby married Ann M. Patterson of Belfast.

== Politics ==
Crosby was an unsuccessful Whig candidate for Congress in 1838. He actively campaigned for William Henry Harrison during the presidential election of 1840. Crosby served as delegate to the 1844 Whig National Convention that nominated Henry Clay for President of the United States. From 1846 to 1849, Crosby served as secretary of the Maine Board of Education, the first person to hold this position. In 1850, he was the unsuccessful Whig nominee for Governor of Maine.

In 1852, Crosby was elected governor and he was re-elected in 1853. In both elections, he finished second in a three-way race; at the time of Crosby's elections, the state constitution imposed a majority-vote requirement in gubernatorial elections, with the legislature picking the winner if no candidate won a majority. In 1852, Crosby won 31% of the vote to Democratic governor John Hubbard's 44%. Following the election, a coalition of anti-slavery Democrats, Whigs, and Free Soilers formed a coalition and elected Crosby as governor. In 1853, Crosby ran for re-election against Democrat Albert Pillsbury and anti-Maine Law nominee Anson Morrill; he received 32% of the vote to Pillsbury's 44% and Morrill's 13%. The governing coalition from the previous election had originally agreed to elect Morrill as governor, but the Whigs defected and voted to re-elect Crosby instead. Crosby did not seek re-election in 1854.

== Later years ==
After leaving the office, he served as a trustee of Bowdoin College and a member of the Maine Historical Society. He also accepted an appointment as federal collector of customs for he district which included Belfast. In 1870, he received the honorary degree of LL.D. from Bowdoin.

He died in Belfast on March 21, 1881, and was buried at Grove Cemetery in Belfast.

William G. Crosby High School in Belfast was built in 1923, and later served as the city's middle school. It was closed in 1991, and since then it has been used for a variety of other activities.

== Bibliography ==
- Sobel, Robert and John Raimo. Biographical Directory of the Governors of the United States, 1789-1978. Greenwood Press, 1988. ISBN 0-313-28093-2
- William G. Crosby at National Governors Association

Party political offices
Preceded by Elijah Hamlin	Whig nominee for Governor of Maine; 1850, 1852, 1853	Succeeded by Isaac Reed
Political offices
Preceded by John Hubbard	Governor of Maine; 1853–1855	Succeeded by Anson Morrill
