= 1863 Maine gubernatorial election =

- September 14, 1863
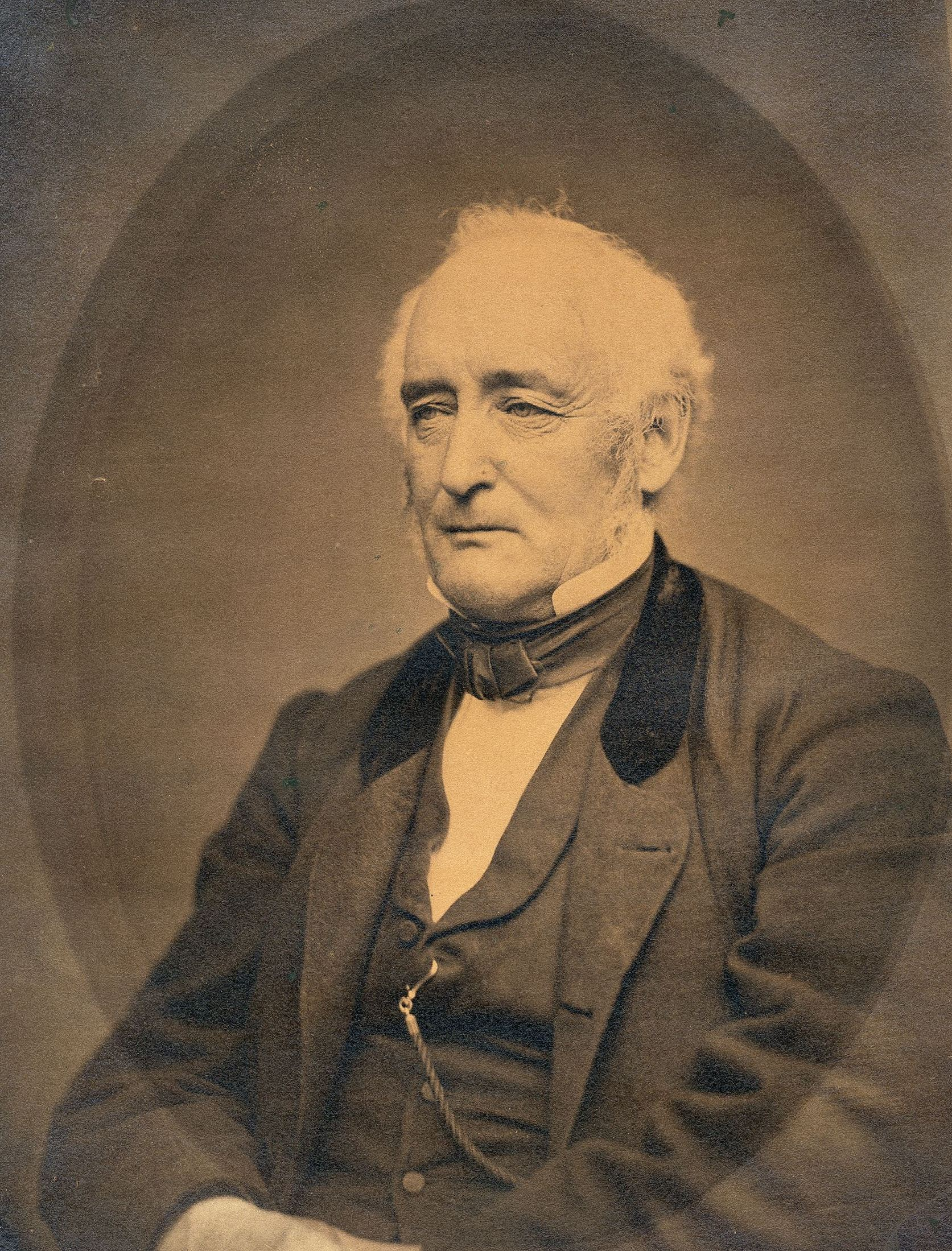

Nominee	Samuel Cony	Bion Bradbury
Party	National Union	Democratic
Popular vote	68,339	50,687
Percentage	57.42%	42.58%
- County results Cony: 50–60% 60–70% Bradbury: 50–60%
Governor before election
Abner Coburn
Republican
Elected Governor
Samuel Cony
National Union

The 1863 Maine gubernatorial election took place on September 14, 1863, in order to elect the governor of Maine. The National Union candidate Samuel Cony won his first one-year term as governor against Democratic candidate Bion Bradbury.

== Candidates ==
=== Union Party ===
- Samuel Cony, the Union nominee, was a member of the Maine House of Representatives, having been elected in 1862. He had previously been a member of the Democratic party, serving as the Maine State Treasurer from 1850 to 1854, on the Executive Council of Maine in 1839, and in the Maine House of Representatives from 1835 to 1836.

=== Democratic Party ===
- Bion Bradbury, the Democratic nominee, was a member of the Maine House of Representatives, having been elected in 1861. He had been the Democrats' nominee in the 1862 gubernatorial election.

During his campaign, Bradbury claimed that president Abraham Lincoln had violated the Constitution by suspending habeas corpus, and was a vocal opponent of emancipation. A controversy occurred where General Samuel J. Anderson claimed in an interview that Bradbury would withdraw Maine's troops from the American Civil War, Bradbury denied this and accused Anderson of libel.

== Election ==
=== Statewide ===
1863 Maine gubernatorial election
Party	Candidate	Votes	%
National Union	Samuel Cony	68,339	57.42
Democratic	Bion Bradbury	50,687	42.58
Total votes		119,026	100.00
National Union gain from Republican			
