= John P. Thomas =

American architect

- Born: March 30, 1886; Portland, Maine
- Died: August 9, 1944 (aged 58); Harpswell, Maine
- Occupation: Architect

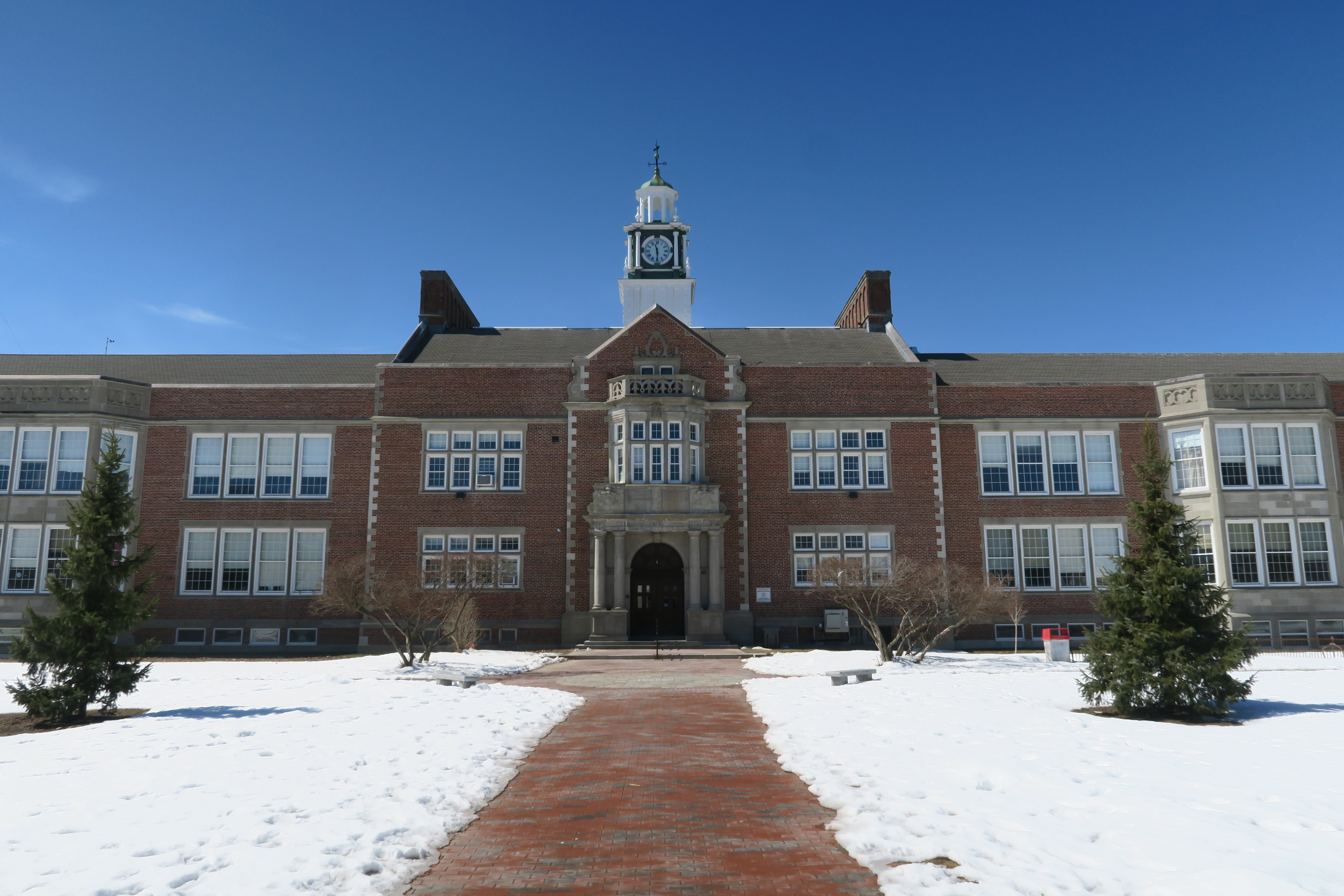
Deering High School in Portland, designed by Poor & Thomas and built in 1922.

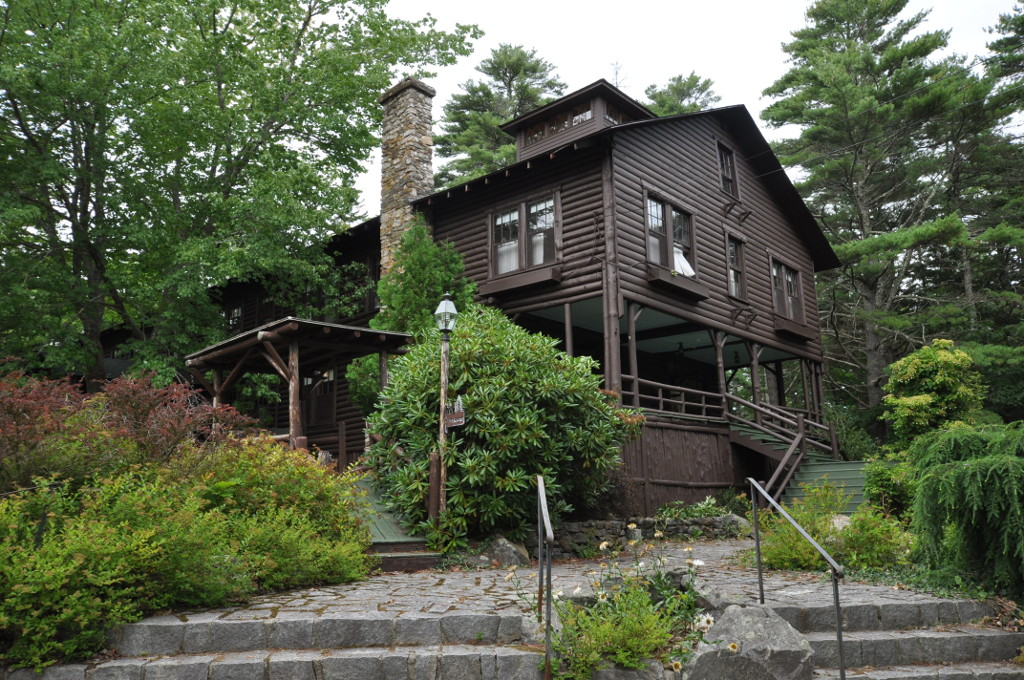
The Sprucewold Lodge annex in Boothbay Harbor, built in 1927.

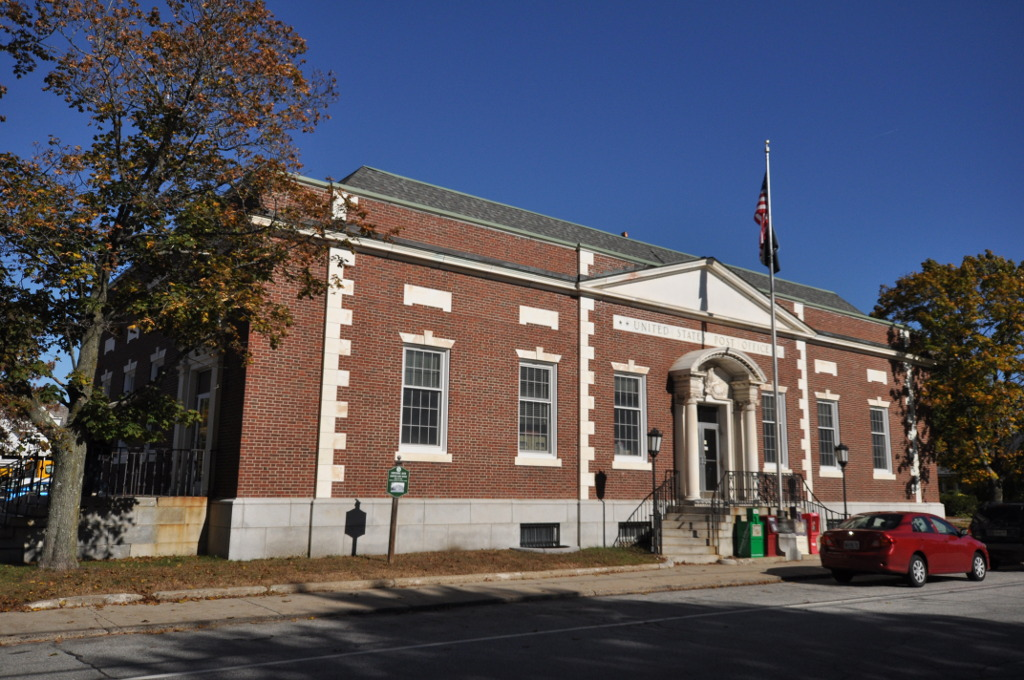
The United States Post Office in Sanford, designed by Thomas and built in 1932.

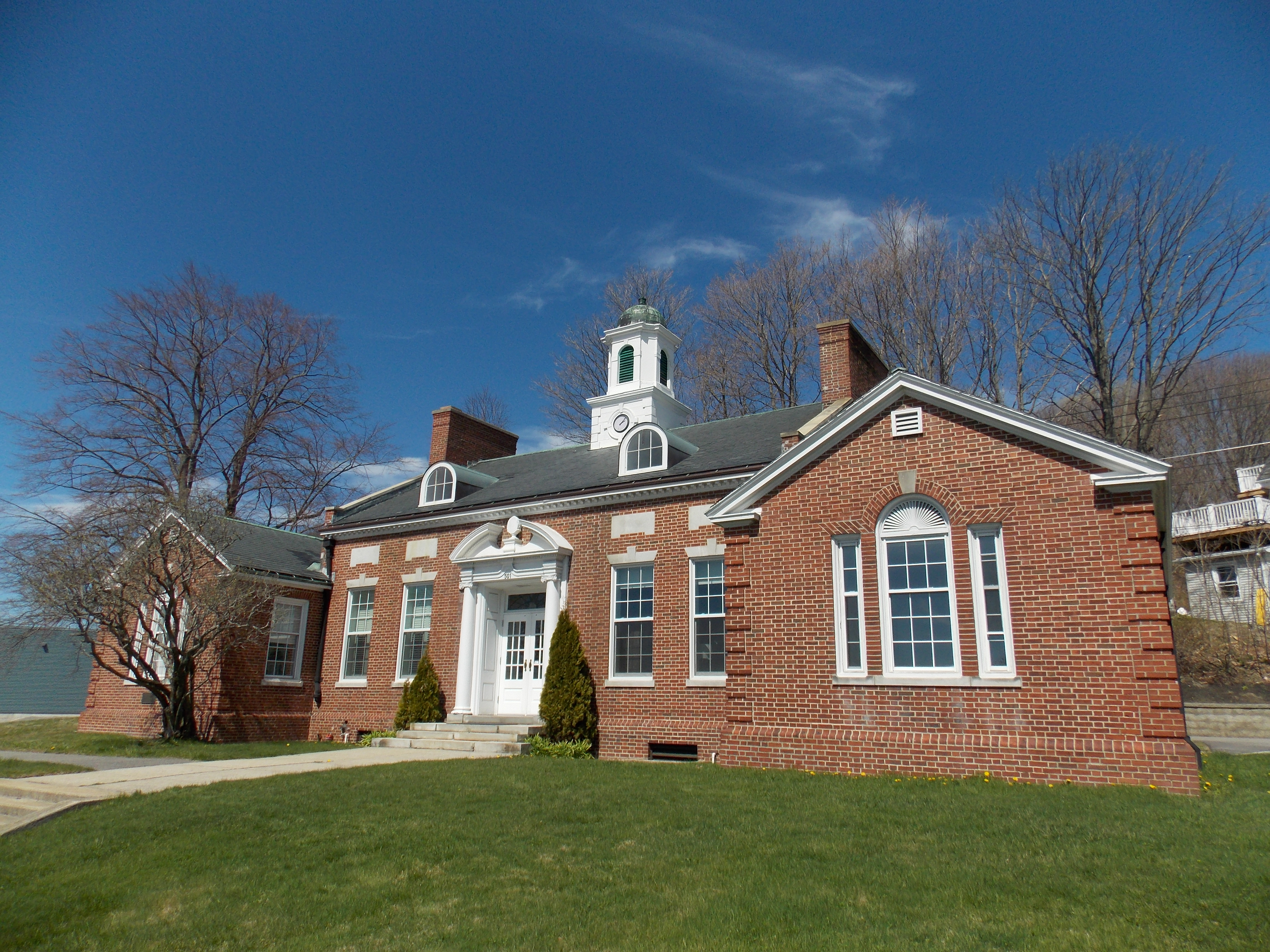
The Maine Publicity Bureau Building in Portland, built in 1936.

John P. Thomas (March 30, 1886 – August 9, 1944) was an American architect in practice in Portland, Maine.

== Life and career ==
John Pickering Thomas Jr. was born in Portland, Maine, in 1886 to John Pickering Thomas and Susan Clifford (Ross) Thomas. He was a grandson of William W. Thomas, one-time mayor of Portland, and nephew of William W. Thomas Jr., the diplomat. He was educated at Milton Academy and graduated from Harvard University in 1909, followed by postgraduate work in the Harvard School of Architecture and travel in Italy. After his return to Boston, Thomas worked for C. Howard Walker and William Welles Bosworth, before joining the office of Wait & Copeland in 1913. Boston architects with Portland connections, their works included a house for Thomas' cousin, William W. Thomas, on the Western Promenade. (Note: Built for the son of Thomas' uncle, Elias Thomas, in 1910 at 120 West Street.) He resigned in 1917 to serve in World War I, spending his time in the Naval Reserve.

In 1919, Thomas returned to Portland permanently, forming a partnership with architect Charles O. Poor, successor to the practice of Frederick A. Tompson. In 1922, Poor died in a railroad accident, and Thomas continued the business alone. In 1923 he incorporated the firm under his own name, in association with Murray Crosman Binford and Albert Cyprian Hobbs. Thomas continued in independent practice for almost twenty years, closing his office in late 1941 upon the United States' entry into World War II. During the war, Thomas, still in the Naval Reserve, was attached to the local Naval Intelligence office.

Thomas joined the American Institute of Architects in 1921.

== Personal life ==
Thomas was married in 1913 to Alice Kimber McCandless of St. Louis. They had three children, including two daughters and one son.

== Death ==
Thomas died in 1944, at his summer home in Harpswell, Maine. He was 58.

== Legacy ==
During his lifetime, Thomas was known as a talented designer of buildings in revival styles. His works in the Colonial Revival and Gothic Revival styles in particular were intended to invoke the English heritage of both Thomas and Portland. Four of Thomas' works have been listed on the United States National Register of Historic Places, and others contribute to listed historic districts.

The noted Maine architects Royal Boston Jr. and Josiah T. Tubby both worked for Thomas as drafters and designers.

== Architectural works ==
- Walter G. Davis house, (Note: As supervising architect for William Lawrence Bottomley of New York City.) (Note: A contributing resource to the Western Promenade Historic District, NRHP-listed in 1984.) 155 Western Promenade, Portland, Maine (1920)
- James C. Hamlen Jr. house, 149 Western Promenade, Portland, Maine (1920)
- Deering High School, (Note: In association with consulting architect Thomas Marriott James of Boston.) 370 Stevens Ave, Portland, Maine (1922–23)
- Spaulding Memorial Library, 282 Sebago Rd, Sebago, Maine (1923)
- Chestnut Street Methodist Church Community House, 17 Chestnut St, Portland, Maine (1924, NRHP 1977)
- Louis R. Porteous house, 28 Chadwick St, Portland, Maine (1924)
- The Pilgrim, 30 West St, Portland, Maine (1925)
- YMCA Building, 70 Forest Ave, Portland, Maine (1925–27)
- Ricker Park apartments, 290 Baxter Blvd, Portland, Maine (1926–27)
- Sprucewold Lodge, 4–9 Nahanada Rd, Boothbay Harbor, Maine (1926 and 1927, NRHP 2014)
- Walter G. Davis house, 402 Pulpit Rock Rd, Cape Elizabeth, Maine (1927–28)
- Guy P. Gannett house, 880 Shore Rd, Cape Elizabeth, Maine (1927)
- James C. Hamlen house, 15 Chadwick St, Portland, Maine (1927)
- Zeta Psi fraternity house, (Note: A contributing resource to the Federal Street Historic District, NRHP-listed in 1976. Now Ladd House of Bowdoin College.) 14 College St, Brunswick, Maine (1927–28)
- Bonney Memorial Library, 36 Main St, Cornish, Maine (1928)
- Canal Bank Building, 188 Middle St, Portland, Maine (1929–30)
- Gardiner Public Library R. P. Hazzard wing, 152 Water St, Gardiner, Maine (1929–30)
- YWCA Building (former), 41 2nd St, Bangor, Maine (1929–30)
- Gov. Samuel Cony House alterations, 71 Stone St, Augusta, Maine (1930, NRHP 1985)
- Plummer-Motz School, 192 Middle Rd, Falmouth, Maine (1931, NRHP 2016)
- United States Post Office, 28 School St, Sanford, Maine (1932, NRHP 1986)
- Quoddy Village, Eastport, Maine (1935–36)
- Maine Publicity Bureau Building, 501 Danforth St, Portland, Maine (1936, NRHP 1990)
- Stevens Avenue Armory (former), 772 Stevens Ave, Portland, Maine (1940)

== See also ==
- John Pickering Thomas architectural drawings collection, Maine Historical Society
