= 1865 Maine gubernatorial election =

- September 11, 1865
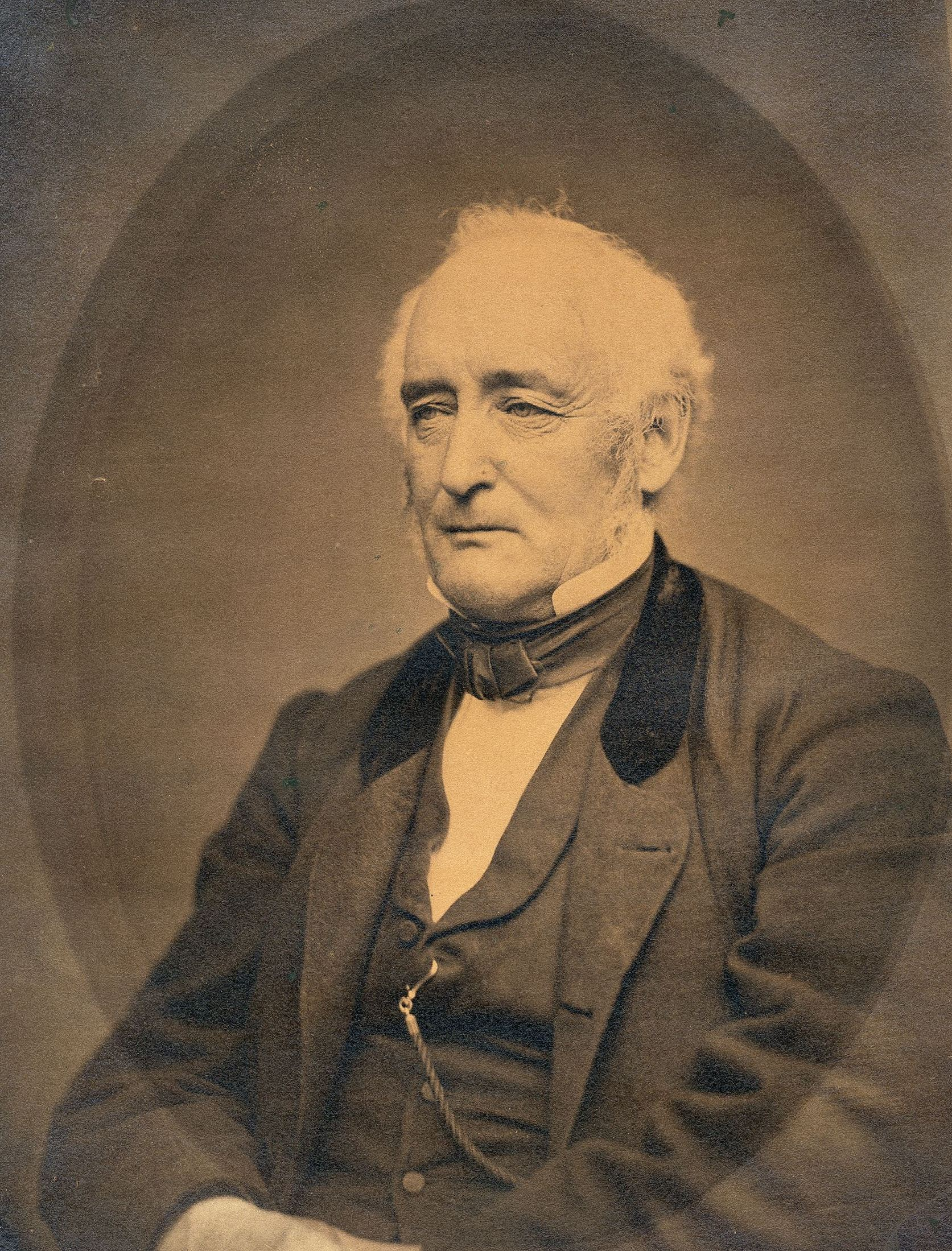

Nominee	Samuel Cony	Joseph Howard
Party	National Union	Democratic
Popular vote	54,430	31,609
Percentage	63.31%	36.69%
- County results Cony: 50–60% 60–70% 70–80%
Governor before election
Samuel Cony
National Union
Elected Governor
Samuel Cony
National Union

The 1865 Maine gubernatorial election was held on September 11, 1865, in order to elect the governor of Maine. Incumbent National Union governor Samuel Cony won re-election against Democratic nominee and former Justice of the Maine Supreme Judicial Court Joseph Howard in a rematch of the previous election.

== General election ==
Maine gubernatorial election, 1865
Party	Candidate	Votes	%
National Union	Samuel Cony (incumbent)	54,234	63.31
Democratic	Joseph Howard	31,435	36.69
Total votes		85,669	100.00
National Union hold			

== Bibliography ==
- Dubin, Michael J. (2014). United States Gubernatorial Elections, 1861–1911: The Official Results by State and County. Jefferson, NC: McFarland and Company. ISBN 978-0-7864-5646-8.
