= USS Affray (MSO-511) =

Minesweeper of the United States Navy

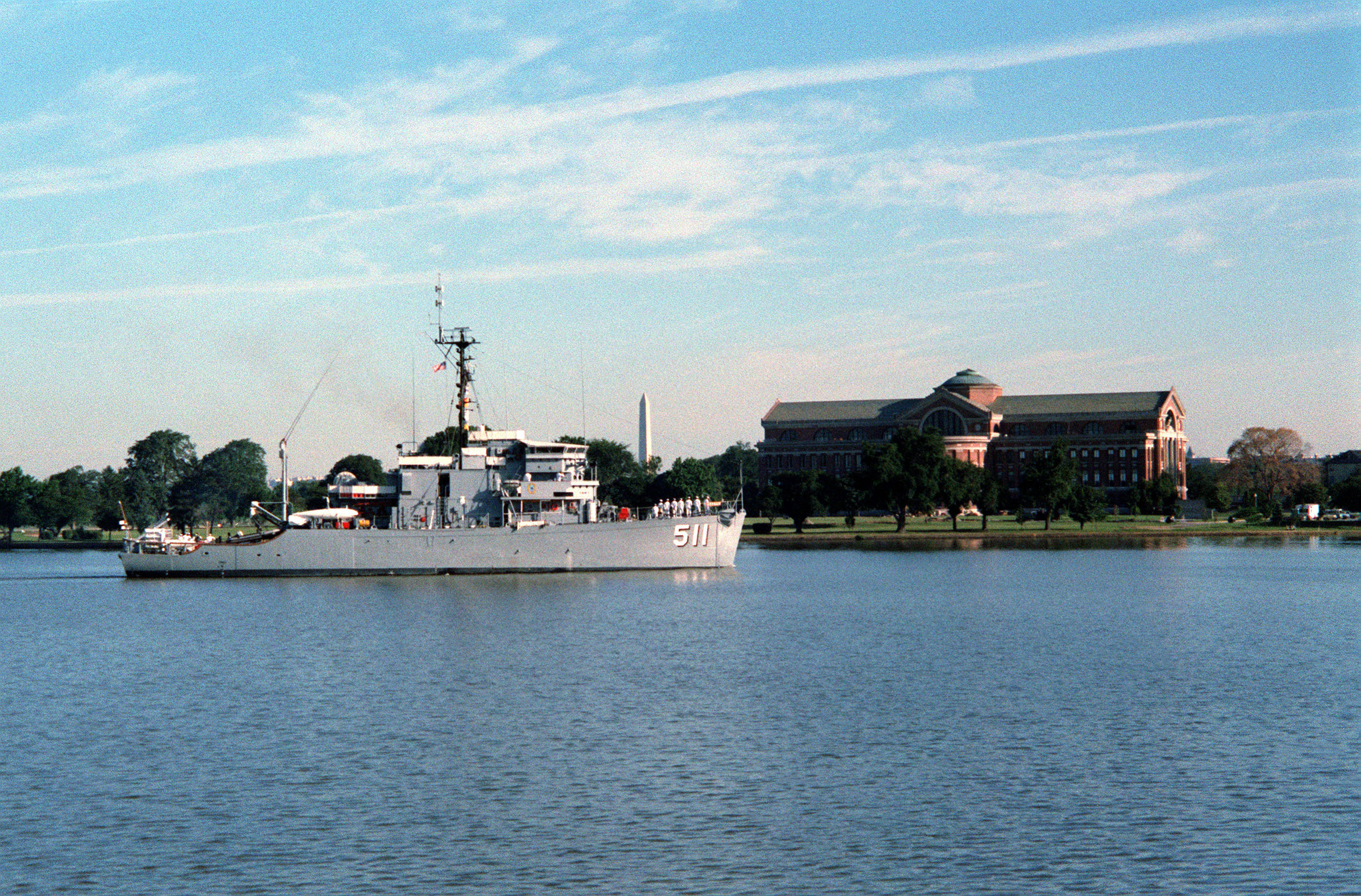

History

United States
- Laid down: 24 August 1955
- Launched: 18 December 1956
- Commissioned: 8 December 1958
- Decommissioned: 20 December 1992
- Stricken: 28 June 1993
- Home port: Charleston, South Carolina; Portland, Maine; Newport, Rhode Island
- Fate: Sold for scrapping, 4 December 2000

General characteristics
- Displacement: 750 tons
- Length: 173 ft (53 m)
- Beam: 36 ft (11 m)
- Draught: 14 ft (4.3 m)
- Speed: 14 knots
- Complement: 78
- Armament: one 40 mm gun mount, two .50 cal (12.7 mm) machine guns

USS Affray (AM-511/MSO-511) was an Acme-class minesweeper acquired by the U.S. Navy for the task of removing mines that had been placed in the water to prevent the safe passage of ships.

The second ship to be named Affray by the Navy was laid down on 24 August 1955 at Boothbay Harbor, Maine, by Frank L. Sample, Jr., Inc.; launched on 18 December 1956; sponsored by Mrs. John A. Click; and commissioned on 8 December 1958.

== East Coast operations ==
After fitting out, Affray devoted the first six months of 1959 to shakedown and type training. At the end of June, she entered the Charleston Naval Shipyard for post-shakedown overhaul. Complicated by the addition of modernization alterations, the repair period lasted into 1960.

== North Atlantic/European operations ==
After completing final acceptance trials, the minesweeper joined the Atlantic Fleet Mine Force and, for almost a decade, alternated between deployments to the Mediterranean with the U.S. 6th Fleet, extended tours of duty in the West Indies, and a variety of assignments out of her home port. Her duties during cruises to the Mediterranean and the West Indies consisted mainly of exercises and goodwill visits to various ports. Her operations out of Charleston took a number of forms. In October 1962, Affray provided support for a Project Mercury space shot. Later in 1966, she participated in a succession of tests for such organizations as the Bureau of Ships, the Mine Warfare School, the David Taylor Model Basin, and the Naval Ordnance Laboratory Test Facility.

== Training ship assignments ==
At the end of October 1969, the minesweeper concluded her final deployment to the Mediterranean Sea. Assignments in the West Indies, however, remained an important feature on her agenda as did support services for the Mine Warfare School and for Navy research and development activities. In 1973, Affray's assignment was changed significantly. On 1 July, she received orders reassigning her to naval reserve training duty. On 1 October, the warship reported for duty at her new home port -- Portland, Maine. There she served as a drill platform for naval reservists. In addition, she continued to participate in major exercises emphasizing minesweeping and amphibious warfare. On 1 October 1981, after being based eight years at Portland, Affray was reassigned to Newport, Rhode Island. As of the end of 1986, she was training naval reservists from her base at Newport.

== Decommissioning ==
Affray was decommissioned on 20 December 1992 and struck from the Navy list on 28 June 1993. She was sold in the year 2000 for scrapping.
