= Charles Davis Jameson =

American politician

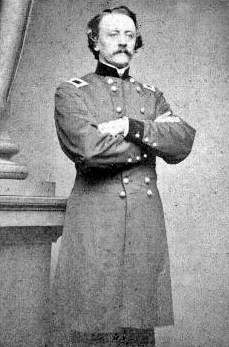
- Brig. Gen. Charles Davis Jameson, ca. 1862
- Born: February 24, 1827; Gorham, Maine
- Died: November 6, 1862 (aged 35); Old Town, Maine
- Burial place: Riverside Cemetery, Stillwater, Maine
- Military career
- Allegiance: United States of America; Union
- Branch: United States Army; Union Army
- Service years: 1861–1862
- Rank: Brigadier General
- Commands: 2nd Maine Infantry
- Conflicts: American Civil War; First Battle of Bull Run; Peninsula Campaign; Battle of Fair Oaks

Charles Davis Jameson (February 24, 1827 – November 6, 1862) was an American Civil War general and Democratic Party candidate for Governor of Maine. He contracted "camp fever" (likely typhoid fever) at the Battle of Fair Oaks, returned to his native state of Maine, dying in transit or soon after.

Jameson was born in Gorham, Maine, but his family moved to the lumbering and sawmilling center of Old Town, Maine, when he was still a child. Jameson became a successful lumberman and, in 1860, was a delegate to the Democratic National Convention from Maine. With the outbreak of war in 1861, he was elected Colonel commanding the 2nd Maine Volunteer Infantry Regiment, the first Maine unit to leave the state for the front. He led his regiment into the First Battle of Bull Run and was soon made Brigadier General of Volunteers.

In the months after Bull Run, the Democratic Party of Maine split into anti-war and pro-war factions, and Jameson became the gubernatorial candidate of the "War Democrats". He lost the election to Republican Israel Washburn, Jr. from the neighboring town of Orono, but narrowly beat the anti-war Democrat, John W. Dana. In 1862, however, with the war going badly, Jameson was largely abandoned by Democratic voters when he ran again, though the anti-war Democratic candidate was defeated by Republican Abner Coburn.

Later that year at the Battle of Fair Oaks, Jameson was wounded and subsequently disabled by "camp fever" (likely typhoid fever) and allowed to return to Maine. He died in Old Town on November 6, 1862, and is buried at Riverside Cemetery in Stillwater, Maine. Some sources report that Jameson actually died on the steamship carrying him home between Boston, Massachusetts and Bangor, Maine.
