= Charles Chapman (guitarist) =

American jazz musician

- Born: 1951; Trenton, New Jersey, U.S.
- Died: July 15, 2011 (aged 59–60) Boothbay Harbor, Maine, U.S.
- Genres: Jazz
- Instrument: Electric guitar

Charles H. Chapman (1951 – July 15, 2011) was an American jazz guitarist, author, and instructor. He had a four-decade recording career and played with Kenny Burrell and Joe Negri.

== Early life and education ==
Born in Trenton, New Jersey, Chapman studied at the Berklee College of Music, which offered him a teaching position after he graduated.

== Career ==
Chapman recorded the tracks for the CDs that accompany the three volumes of the Berklee Modern Method for Guitar by William Leavitt. Chapman wrote over 500 articles and nine books on guitar.

== Personal life ==
After being diagnosed with cancer, he was unable to continue teaching and retired in 2003. He and his wife moved to Boothbay Harbor, Maine, where they had vacationed for 25 years. At the age of 60, he died of a brain tumor on July 15, 2011.

== Works ==
- Drop-2 concept for guitar. Mel Bay Publications, Inc. 2000. ISBN 0786644834.
- Finger gymnastics: Warm-up, flexibility, speed and strength studies (with CD). Mel Bay Publications, Inc. 2000. ISBN 9780786653157.
