= Bayville =

Bayville may refer to a community in the United States:

- Bayville, Maine
- Bayville, New Jersey
- Bayville, New York
