= 1864 Maine gubernatorial election =

- September 12, 1864
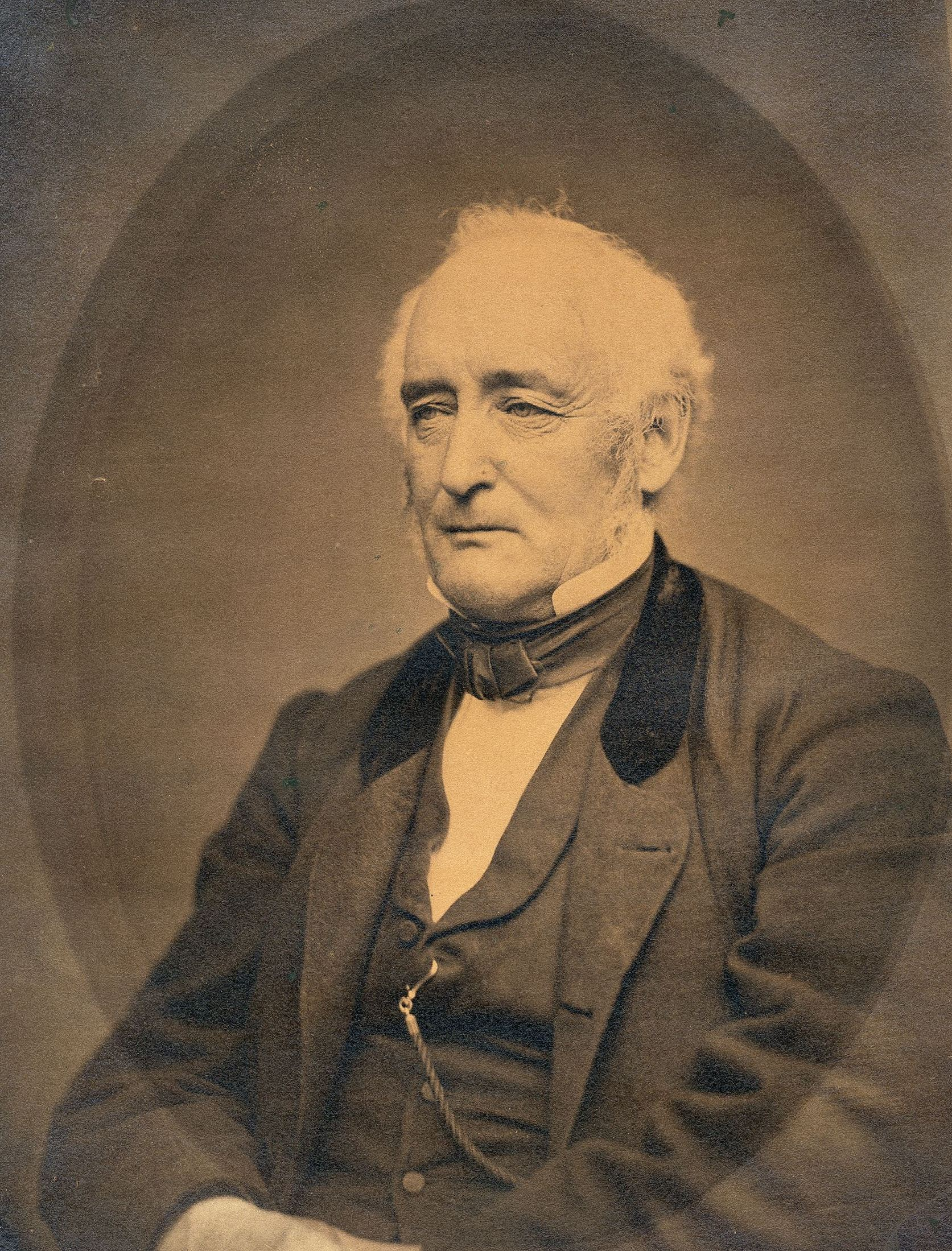

Nominee	Samuel Cony	Joseph Howard
Party	National Union	Democratic
Popular vote	65,583	46,403
Percentage	58.56%	41.44%
- County results Cony: 50–60% 60–70% Howard: 50–60%
Governor before election
Samuel Cony
National Union
Elected Governor
Samuel Cony
National Union

The 1864 Maine gubernatorial election was held on September 12, 1864, in order to elect the governor of Maine. Incumbent National Union governor Samuel Cony won re-election against Democratic nominee and former Justice of the Maine Supreme Judicial Court Joseph Howard.

== General election ==
Maine gubernatorial election, 1864
Party	Candidate	Votes	%
National Union	Samuel Cony (incumbent)	65,583	58.56
Democratic	Joseph Howard	46,403	41.44
Total votes		111,986	100.00
National Union hold			

== Bibliography ==
- Dubin, Michael J. (2014). United States Gubernatorial Elections, 1861–1911: The Official Results by State and County. Jefferson, NC: McFarland and Company. ISBN 978-0-7864-5646-8.
