= William Leavitt =

William Leavitt may refer to:

- William Leavitt (musician) (1926–1990), American jazz guitarist and arranger
- William Leavitt (artist) (born 1941), conceptual artist
- William Homer Leavitt (1871–?), American portrait painter
