= Nancy Hemenway Barton =

American artist (1920–2008)

Nancy Hemenway Whitten Barton (June 19, 1920 – February 23, 2008) was an American artist who specialized in tapestries created from a wide range of fabrics. She created an art form she called "bayetage"—a combination of flower-dyed wool, bayeta, and collage. Hemenway had one-woman exhibitions at more than 20 museums around the world, including the Farnsworth Art Museum, the Los Angeles County Museum, the Metropolitan Museum of Art, the Art Institute of Chicago, and the Edinburgh City Art Centre, Scotland. A retrospective exhibition, "Ahead of Her Time", was held at the University of New England Gallery in Portland, Maine, in the fall of 2017.

== Early life ==
Born Nancy Hemenway Whitten in Boothbay Harbor, Maine, she grew up on a small Massachusetts farm, and was the valedictorian of Foxboro High School's Class of 1937. A concert pianist, she received a music scholarship from Wheaton College in Norton, Massachusetts, graduating in 1941. Hemenway studied music composition at Harvard University with Walter Piston.

In 1942, she married a childhood friend, newly commissioned Marine Lt. Robert D. Barton. After World War II, he joined the Foreign Service, and over the years they lived in Uruguay, Argentina, Mexico, Bolivia, Spain, and the Dominican Republic. They also resided in Bronxville, New York, and Washington, D.C. She gave birth to three sons: Bradford, William, and Frederick.

== Artistic career ==
Hemenway's artistic focus began with watercolors, primarily landscapes and portraits. In 1957, after returning to the United States, she studied and worked at the Art Students League of New York and expanded into oils, most often still lifes, portraits, and abstracts. She has a Master's degree in Spanish lyric poetry from Columbia University. Her publications include: a volume of poetry (Abundance), a journal of her creative process (Remembrance and Song), and catalogues that accompanied two of her major traveling exhibitions (Aqua Lapis, Embroidered Wall Sculptures and New England Light).

She developed her trademark medium—highly original tapestries created from lambswool, linen, mohair, alpaca, karakul—almost by accident. In 1966 her art supplies were delayed in transit to La Paz, Bolivia, so she began to work with local fabrics. On a trip into the High Andes, she put some yarns and odd bits of material into a small bag and then added the rough wools handloomed by Bolivian country people, their yarn dyed with wildflowers. With those basic elements—working with sewing needles in place of a brush—she created the bayetage. The textile wall hangings began as a celebration of local culture and the pre-Columbian traditions of South American Indian cultures and grew to incorporate representations of nature in the United States, particularly Maine's rocky shores.

In a profile for her Textures of the Earth catalogue (1978), Washington Star art critic Benjamin Forgey wrote: "Painstaking observation of specific visual facts; careful nurturing of authentic personal experiences; skilled translation of these visual and emotional impressions into new tactile forms -- these are the essential facets of Nancy Hemenway's art-making. It is a skilled, poetic enterprise that produces the evocative resonances we can find in these unusual tapestries."

Edward Maeder—who curated Hemenway's one-woman exhibition at the Los Angeles County Museum of Art in 1988—wrote, “For Hemenway, light and space are crucial and inseparable. Winter light in New England is a subject of major celebration with the contrasts of snow, spruce, and sky against the sea. These images have inspired the vivid colors of her most recent work.” Besides the many solo exhibitions, her work also was featured in the museums of seven Asian countries as part of a U.S. government tour, and her 1970 show at the Pan American Union became the subject of a U.S. Information Agency film.

== Recognition ==
Hemenway was a resident artist at the Cummington Foundation and was a fellow at the American Academy in Rome and at the Djerassi Foundation. She was honored by Westbrook College as a Deborah Morton Outstanding Maine Woman and by Wheaton College with a doctor of fine arts degree. She lectured throughout Africa under the auspices of USIA and with a grant from the National Endowment for the Arts. Videos of her creative process and studio work have been preserved along with a substantial collection of her papers, recordings, and correspondence by the Hemenway Foundation.

She was a voice for women’s rights and mentored many younger women artists as they sought to balance their careers and personal lives.
