= Samuel J. Anderson =

American businessperson and politician

Member of the Maine House of Representatives from the Portland district
- In office 1876–1876

Personal details
- Born: 1824
- Died: 1905 (aged 80–81)
- Party: Democrat
- Occupation: Businessperson & Lawyer

Samuel Jameson Anderson (1824–1905) was a businessperson, lawyer and politician from Maine. He also was president of the Portland-Ogdensburg Railroad. Anderson, a Democrat, represented Portland in the Maine House of Representatives in 1876.

Anderson was named the initial president of the Portland and Ogdensburg Railroad Company when it was formed in 1869. He was the brother of one of the project's chief engineers, John E. Anderson.

During the 1863 Maine gubernatorial election, Anderson — at that time a Union Army officer — was accused of libel by Democratic gubernatorial nominee Bion Bradbury, when Anderson publicly claimed that Bradbury — a critic of the Civil War and an opponent of emancipation — would recall Maine troops from the war if he were elected.
