= 1862 Maine gubernatorial election =

- September 8, 1862
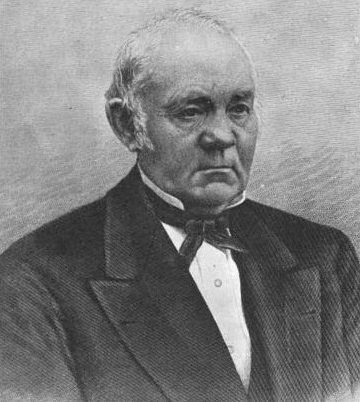

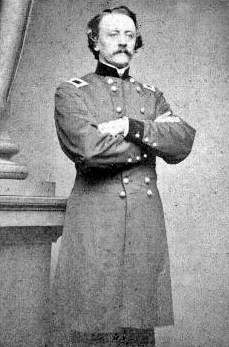
Nominee	Abner Coburn	Bion Bradbury	Charles Davis Jameson
Party	Republican	Democratic	War Democratic
Popular vote	46,780	33,942	7,423
Percentage	53.01%	38.46%	8.41%
- County results Coburn: 40–50% 50–60% 60–70% Bradbury: 50–60%
Governor before election
Israel Washburn Jr.
Republican
Elected Governor
Abner Coburn
Republican

The 1862 Maine gubernatorial election was held on September 8, 1862, in order to elect the Governor of Maine. Republican nominee and incumbent member of the Maine House of Representatives Abner Coburn defeated Democratic nominee Bion Bradbury and War Democrat C. D. Jameson.

== General election ==
On election day, September 8, 1862, Republican nominee Abner Coburn won the election by a margin of 12,838 votes against his foremost opponent Democratic nominee Bion Bradbury, thereby retaining Republican control over the office of governor. Coburn was sworn in as the 30th Governor of Maine on January 7, 1863.

=== Results ===
Maine gubernatorial election, 1862
Party	Candidate	Votes	%
Republican	Abner Coburn	46,780	53.01
Democratic	Bion Bradbury	33,942	38.46
War Democratic	Charles Davis Jameson	7,423	8.41
	Scattering	102	0.12
Total votes		88,247	100.00
Republican hold			
