= West Boothbay Harbor, Maine =

- Village
- Location within Maine Location within the United States
- Coordinates: 43°50′45″N 69°38′58″W
- Country: United States
- State: Maine
- County: Lincoln
- Town: Boothbay Harbor
- Established: October 24, 1882
- Elevation: 23 ft (7.0 m)
- Time zone: UTC-5 (Eastern (EST))
  - Summer (DST): UTC-4 (EDT)
- ZIP code: 04575
- Area code: 207
- GNIS feature ID: 578028

West Boothbay Harbor is an unincorporated village in the town of Boothbay Harbor, Lincoln County, Maine, United States. The community is located along Maine State Route 27, 10.7 miles (17.2 km) south of Wiscasset. West Boothbay Harbor has a post office, with ZIP code 04575.
