= 1861 Maine gubernatorial election =

- September 9, 1861
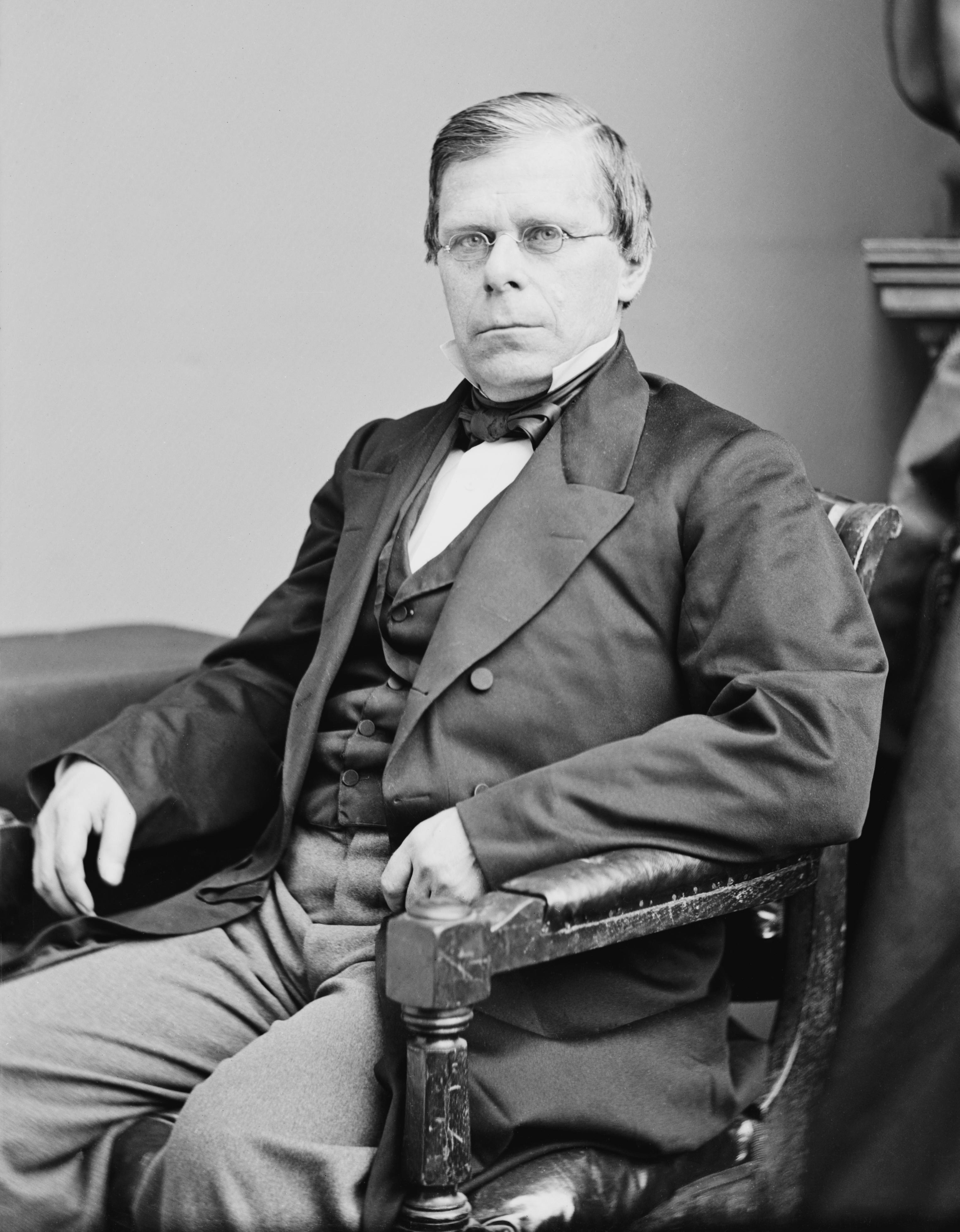

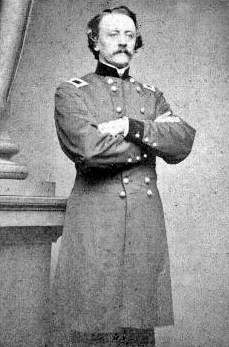

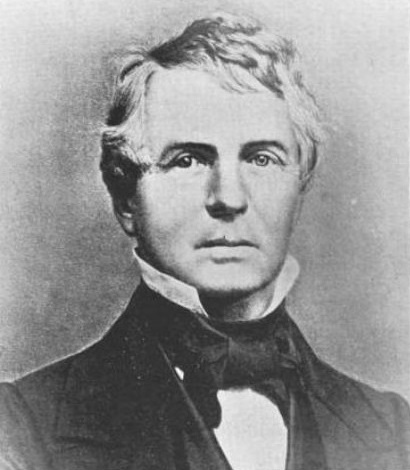
Nominee	Israel Washburn Jr.	Charles Davis Jameson	John W. Dana
Party	Republican	War Democratic	Democratic
Popular vote	57,475	21,119	19,383
Percentage	58.62%	21.54%	19.77%
- County results Washburn: 40–50% 50–60% 60–70%
Governor before election
Israel Washburn Jr.
Republican
Elected Governor
Israel Washburn Jr.
Republican

The 1861 Maine gubernatorial election was held on September 9, 1861, in order to elect the governor of Maine. Incumbent Republican governor Israel Washburn Jr. won re-election against War Democrat Charles Davis Jameson and Democratic nominee and former governor John W. Dana.

== General election ==
On election day, September 9, 1861, incumbent Republican governor Israel Washburn Jr. won re-election by a margin of 36,356 votes against his foremost opponent War Democrat C. D. Jameson, thereby retaining Republican control over the office of governor. Washburn was sworn in for his second term on January 7, 1862.

=== Results ===
Maine gubernatorial election, 1861
Party	Candidate	Votes	%
Republican	Israel Washburn Jr. (incumbent)	57,475	58.62
War Democratic	Charles Davis Jameson	21,119	21.54
Democratic	John W. Dana	19,383	19.77
	Scattering	78	0.07
Total votes		98,055	100.00
Republican hold			
