= Plummer-Motz School =

- Falmouth High School
- U.S. National Register of Historic Places
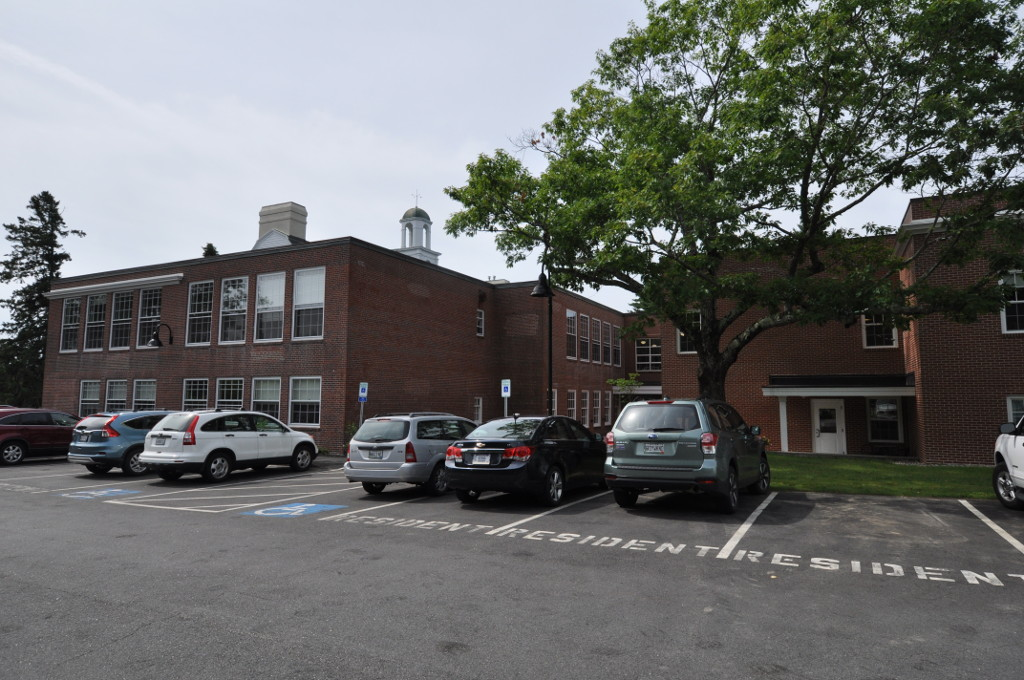

- Location within Maine Location within the United States
- Location: 192 Middle Rd., Falmouth, Maine
- Coordinates: 43°43′26″N 70°14′42″W
- Area: 1.8 acres (0.73 ha)
- Built: 1931
- Architect: John P. Thomas
- Architectural style: Colonial Revival
- NRHP reference No.: 15000967
- Added to NRHP: January 12, 2016

The Plummer-Motz School, formerly Falmouth High School, is a former school building at 192 Middle Road in Falmouth, Maine. Built in the 1930s, it was the town's first high school, serving as first a high school, and later as a junior high school and elementary school, until its closure in 2011. The building has been converted to residential use.

== Description and history ==
The former Plummer-Motz Schools is located south of Falmouth's town center, at the southwest corner of Middle and Lunt Roads. The Plummer School building, originally the high school, is the more northerly part of the complex. It is a two-story Colonial Revival masonry building, with a central portion flanked by projecting wings. It is covered by a dormered gambrel roof with shingled ends and dormers, with a cupola at the center. It was at one time joined by a hyphen to the adjacent Motz School, a pair of single-story gable-roofed buildings. The hyphen was removed in 2014, when the town divided the property and sold the Plummer School building.

Prior to construction of the Plummer School, Falmouth's high school students were educated by arrangement in the schools of adjacent towns. Need for a town high school was identified in 1928, and the central portion and one wing of the Plummer School building were constructed in 1931, to a design by Portland architect John P. Thomas. The second wing was added in 1936 when additional financing was made available. The town continued to grow rapidly over the following decades, resulting the construction of the adjacent school buildings and the eventual conversion of this building to a junior high school. Sometime prior to the 1959-1960 school year the combined Plummer and Motz buildings were converted into an elementary school, a use that continued until 2011. The town in 2013 sold the Plummer School to a developer, who converted it to residential housing.

== See also ==
- National Register of Historic Places listings in Cumberland County, Maine
