= Isle of Springs, Maine =

- Summer resort
- Location within Maine Location within the United States
- Coordinates: 43°51′42″N 69°40′55″W
- Country: United States
- State: Maine
- County: Lincoln
- Town: Boothbay Harbor
- Elevation: 59 ft (18 m)
- Time zone: UTC-5 (Eastern (EST))
  - Summer (DST): UTC-4 (EDT)
- ZIP code: 04537 (Boothbay)
- Area code: 207
- GNIS feature ID: 581627

Isle of Springs is an island community in the town of Boothbay Harbor, Lincoln County, Maine, United States. The community was established in 1887 as a summer resort.
