= U.S. Post Office-Sanford Maine =

- U.S. Post Office-Sanford Main
- U.S. National Register of Historic Places
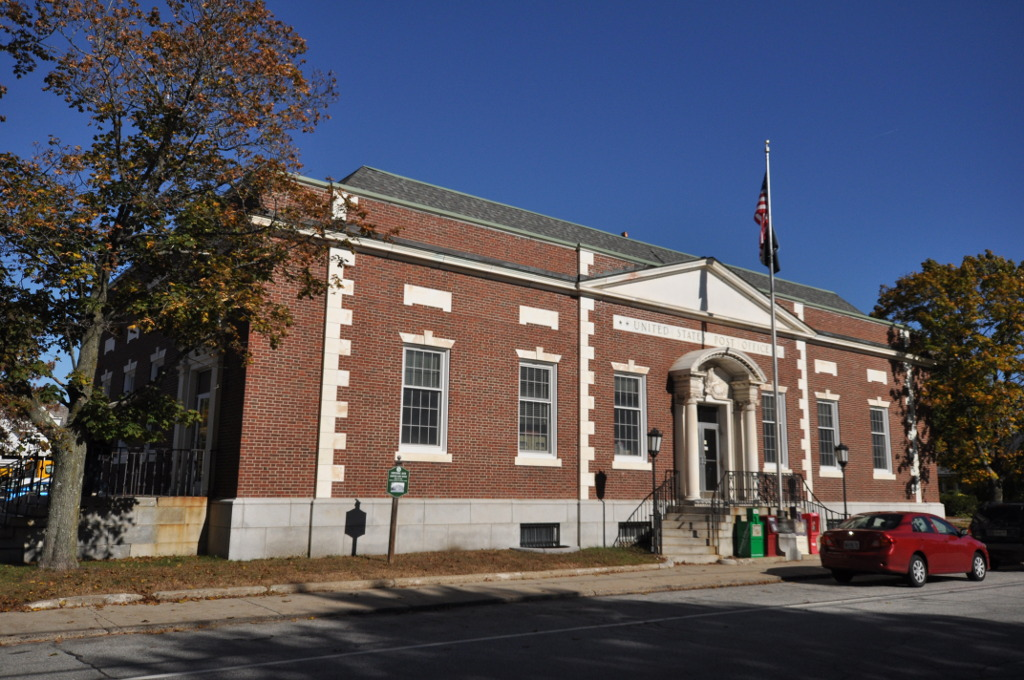

- Location within Maine Location within the United States
- Location: 28 School St., Sanford, Maine
- Coordinates: 43°21′2″N 70°46′33″W
- Area: 0.5 acres (0.20 ha)
- Built: 1932
- Architect: John P. Thomas
- Architectural style: Late 19th And 20th Century Revivals, Federal Revival
- NRHP reference No.: 86000882
- Added to NRHP: May 2, 1986

The U.S. Post Office-Sanford Maine is the main post office of Sanford, Maine. It is located at 28 School Street, near the city's central business district. Built in 1932 and enlarged to include other federal offices in 1965, it is an architecturally distinguished building with Classical and Colonial Revival features. The building was listed on the National Register of Historic Places in 1986.

== Description and history ==
The main Sanford post office is located at the northeast corner of School and Mousam Streets, two blocks southeast of the city center. It is a tall single story brick building, with its primary entrance facing School Street and a secondary entrance on Mousam. A lower single-story addition is connected to the building at its eastern end, which has a separate entrance. The main block is red brick, laid in Flemish bond, with granite and marble trim elements. The main entrance is sheltered by a marble portico supported by marble columns. Three bays at the center of the facade project slightly, and are topped by a gabled pediment. Its corners are quoined, as are the main corners. The secondary entrance also has a marble surround, with pilasters instead of columns. The interior lobby fixtures and furnishings are all original.

The building was constructed in 1932, to a design by John P. Thomas of Portland. The design work was funded by a federal Depression-era program intended to provide employment for regional architects. In 1965 the building was enlarged to include other federal offices.

== See also ==
- National Register of Historic Places listings in York County, Maine
- List of United States post offices
