= Sprucewold Lodge =

- U.S. National Register of Historic Places
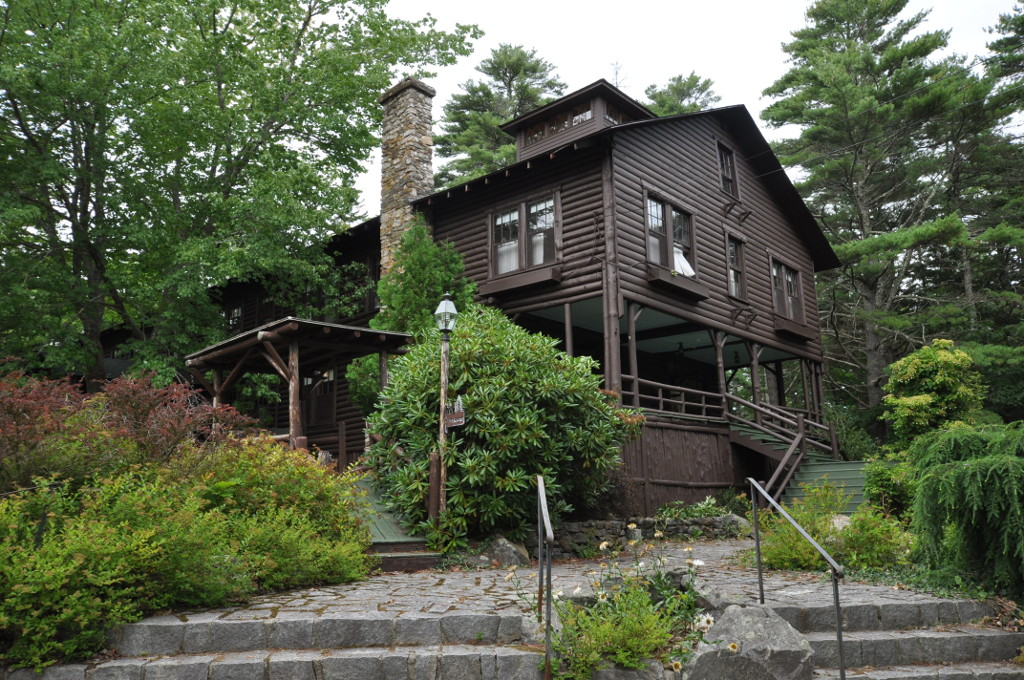

- Location within Maine Location within the United States
- Location: 4-9 Nahanada Rd., Boothbay Harbor, Maine
- Coordinates: 43°50′27″N 69°37′12″W
- Area: 2.4 acres (0.97 ha)
- Built: 1927
- Built by: Elmer Berquist
- Architect: John P. Thomas
- Architectural style: Adirondack
- NRHP reference No.: 14000837
- Added to NRHP: October 8, 2014

Sprucewold Lodge is a historic summer tourist accommodation at 4-9 Nahanada Road in Boothbay Harbor, Maine. Its main lodge built in 1927, it was the centerpiece of an extensive rustic retreat on the Spruce Point peninsula southeast of downtown Boothbay Harbor. The lodge is one of the state's finest examples of rustic Adirondack architecture, and was listed on the National Register of Historic Places in 2014. In 2016, the lodge was listed for sale.

== Description and history ==
Sprucewold Lodge is located in a wooded area near the center of the Spruce Point peninsula, southeast of downtown Boothbay Harbor. The main lodge is set on the north side of Nahanada Road, near its junction with Crest Avenue. The property also includes a series of log and frame cabins on the south side of Nahanada Road, which are now used as employee housing. It is a two-story log structure, with a gabled roof and exposed log exterior. There are recessed porches below the front- and rear-facing gables, each supported by rustic log posts, with log rail balustrades and stair handrails. The main doorway consists of vertically arranged log sections on the outside, and rough board-and-batten on the inside. Window bays on the sides are articulated by vertically placed logs, and a fieldstone chimney rises on the outside of the left wall. The interior public spaces include similar Adirondack-style log decoration, including builtin benches.

Plans for a resort area on Spruce Point were first drafted in the 1880s, but were hampered by a lack of water supply. Town water was laid into the area in 1919, and the Boothbay Land Company then proceeded to develop the eastern side of the peninsular, building about 60 cabins by 1930. The central hotel and lodge was built in 1926 to a design by Portland architect John P. Thomas, and was billed as the world's largest log cabin. The present lodge was built as an annex to the original, which was destroyed by fire in 1931. It is one of the few surviving hotels on the Maine coast from the 1920s, representing the final stage of large scale resort hotel development in the state.

== See also ==
- National Register of Historic Places listings in Lincoln County, Maine
