= Boothbay Harbor Memorial Library =

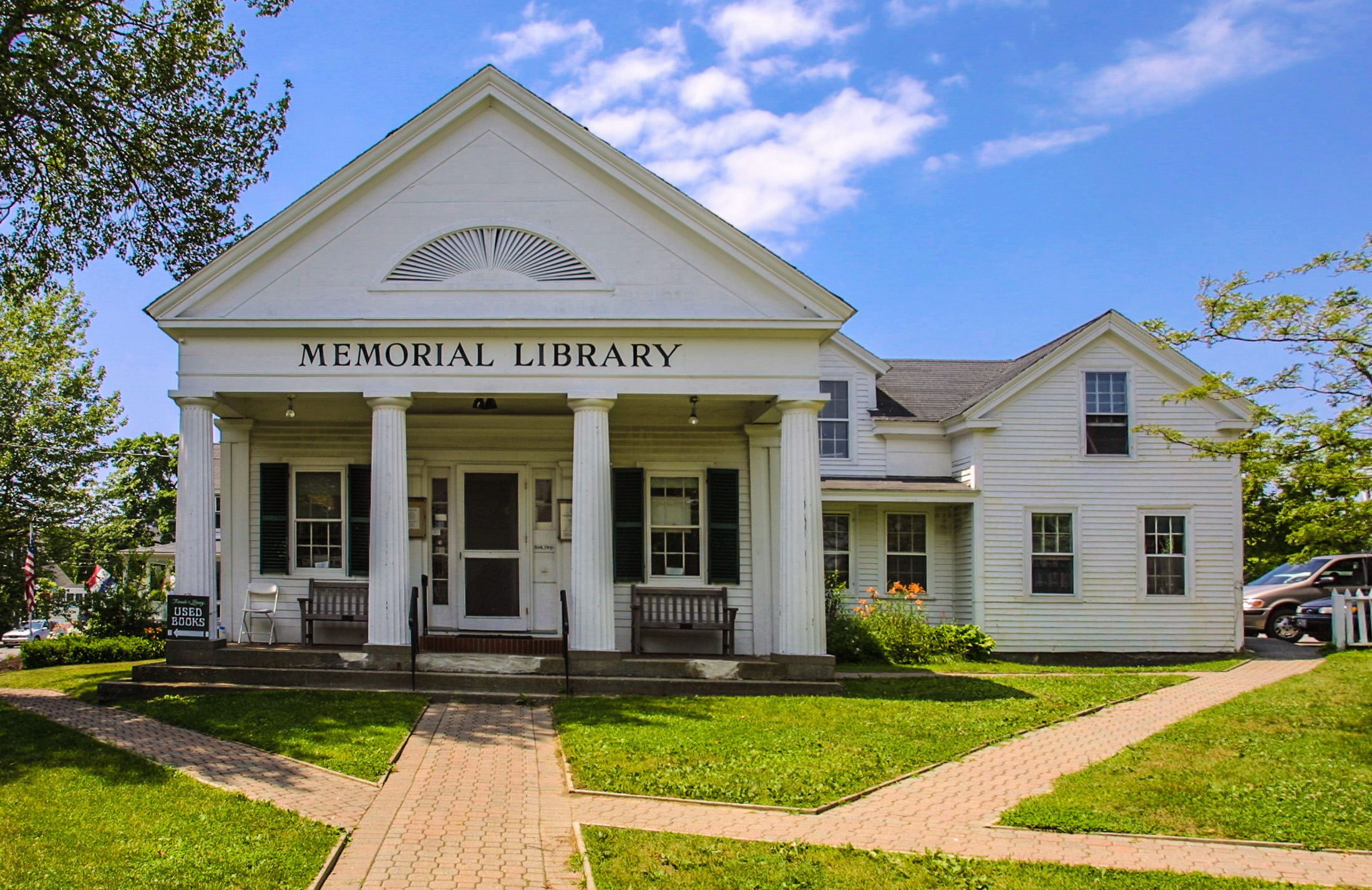
- 43°51′6″N 69°37′42″W
- Location: 4 Oak Street, Boothbay Harbor, Maine, U.S.
- Established: July 11, 1924; 102 years ago

Collection
- Size: 22,755

Access and use
- Circulation: 37,507
- Population served: 5,030 (Boothbay and Boothbay Harbor)

Other information
- Director: Joanna Breen
- Employees: 6
- Website: bbhlibrary.org
- Boothbay Harbor Memorial Library
- U.S. National Register of Historic Places
- Location within Maine Location within the United States
- Location: 4 Oak Street, Boothbay Harbor, Maine
- Built: 1842
- Architectural style: Greek Revival temple
- NRHP reference No.: 77000077
- Added to NRHP: April 18, 1977

Boothbay Harbor Memorial Library is the public library of Boothbay Harbor, Lincoln County, Maine. It is located at 4 Oak Street, in an architecturally significant Greek Revival building constructed as a private residence in 1842. The building was listed on the National Register of Historic Places in 1977. The building also serves as a war memorial to the town's soldiers of the First World War.

== Architecture and history ==
The library building is a multi-section wood frame building, with gabled roof lines and clapboard siding. Its most prominent feature is a tetrastyle Greek Revival temple front, with four fluted Doric columns supporting a broad entablature and a fully pedimented triangular pediment, with a louvered fan at its center. The building corners at the back of this front feature paneled pilasters, and the center entrance is framed by sidelight windows and pilasters, and topped by an entablature. Ells extend the building to the right side.

The library building was built as a private home in 1842. For whom it was built is unclear: the library claims that it was built for William Maxwell Reed, while the preparers of its National Register nomination claim it was built for Cyrus McKown, a prominent local businessman, and sold to Chapman Reed in 1873.

The town's first free library was established in 1906, and occupied rented quarters until the town approved funding to acquire the Reed house, which it purchased in 1923. The building was remodelled for use as a library by the Boston architect Stanley Parker, and was enlarged in 1966 to a design by Parker's son, Stanley Jr.

== See also ==
- National Register of Historic Places listings in Lincoln County, Maine
