= Auld-McCobb House =

Historic house in Maine, United States

- U.S. National Register of Historic Places
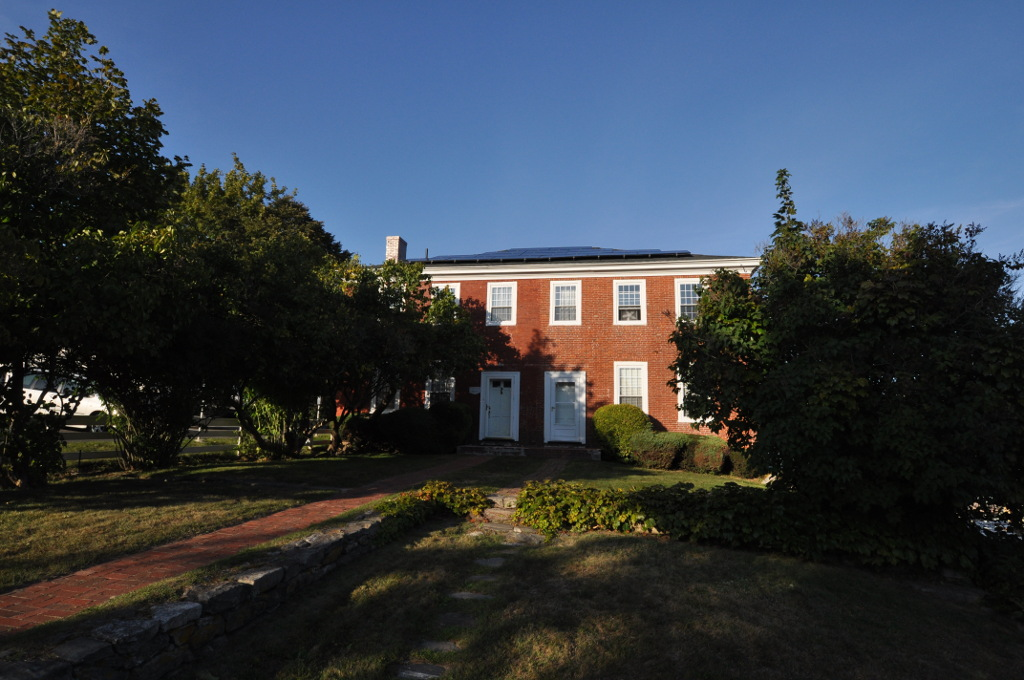

- Location within Maine Location within the United States
- Location: Oak St., Boothbay Harbor, Maine
- Coordinates: 43°51′8″N 69°37′39″W
- Area: less than one acre
- Built: 1807
- Built by: Leishman, John, Jr.
- Architectural style: Federal
- NRHP reference No.: 88000883
- Added to NRHP: June 28, 1988

The Auld-McCobb House is a historic double house on Oak Street in Boothbay Harbor, Maine. It is the town's oldest brick residence, built in 1807 for a pair of prominent local merchants. It was listed on the National Register of Historic Places in 1988.

== Description and history ==
The Auld-McCobb House is set on a rise overlooking downtown Boothbay Harbor, near the center of a triangular block formed by Oak Street, McClintock Street, and Townsend Avenue. It is a large double-pile two story brick structure, with a hip roof and a rubblestone foundation. Its front facade faces roughly west, and is six bays wide. The bays are symmetrically arranged, with two entrances in the center bays, with simple surrounds. Ground-floor windows are twelve-over-twelve sash, and second-floor windows are twelve-over-eight sash, all set in rectangular openings with similar simple trim.

The house was built in 1807 for Jacob Auld and Joseph McCobb, two prominent local merchants. The two were engaged in a business partnership that included fishing, shipbuilding, and general mercantile pursuits, and were a dominant force in the local economy in the first quarter of the 19th century. McCobb married Auld's sister in 1807, and it is thought that this is what occasioned the house's construction. The builder is traditionally identified as John Leishman, Jr., although there is no significant documentation to substantiate this. The house is out of scale for other surviving construction of the period in the town, and the use of brick was also quite unusual.

== See also ==
- National Register of Historic Places listings in Lincoln County, Maine
