= Joseph Howard (judge) =

American judge and politician (1800–1877)

Joseph Howard (March 14, 1800 – December 10, 1877) was an American lawyer and politician from Maine. Howard served as Justice of the Maine Supreme Judicial Court from October 23, 1848 to October 22, 1855.

Born in Brownfield, Maine, Howard graduated from Bowdoin College in 1821 and read law to gain admission to the bar in 1824. He was a United States Attorney from 1837 to 1841. On October 23, 1848, Governor John W. Dana appointed Howard to a seat as an associate justice on the Maine Supreme Judicial Court vacated by the elevation of Ether Shepley to the position of chief justice. Howard served until his retirement on October 22, 1855. In 1860, he was elected Mayor of Portland, Maine, and, in 1865, he ran as the Democratic candidate for governor of Maine, which he lost to Samuel Cony by 63.3% to 37.7%.

He died in Brownfield.

Party political offices
| Preceded by Bion Bradbury | Democratic nominee for Governor of Maine; 1864, 1865 | Succeeded by Eben F. Pillsbury |
Political offices
| Preceded by Ether Shepley | Justice of the Maine Supreme Judicial Court; 1848–1855 | Succeeded by Daniel Goodenow |
