= Maine Publicity Bureau Building =

- U.S. National Register of Historic Places
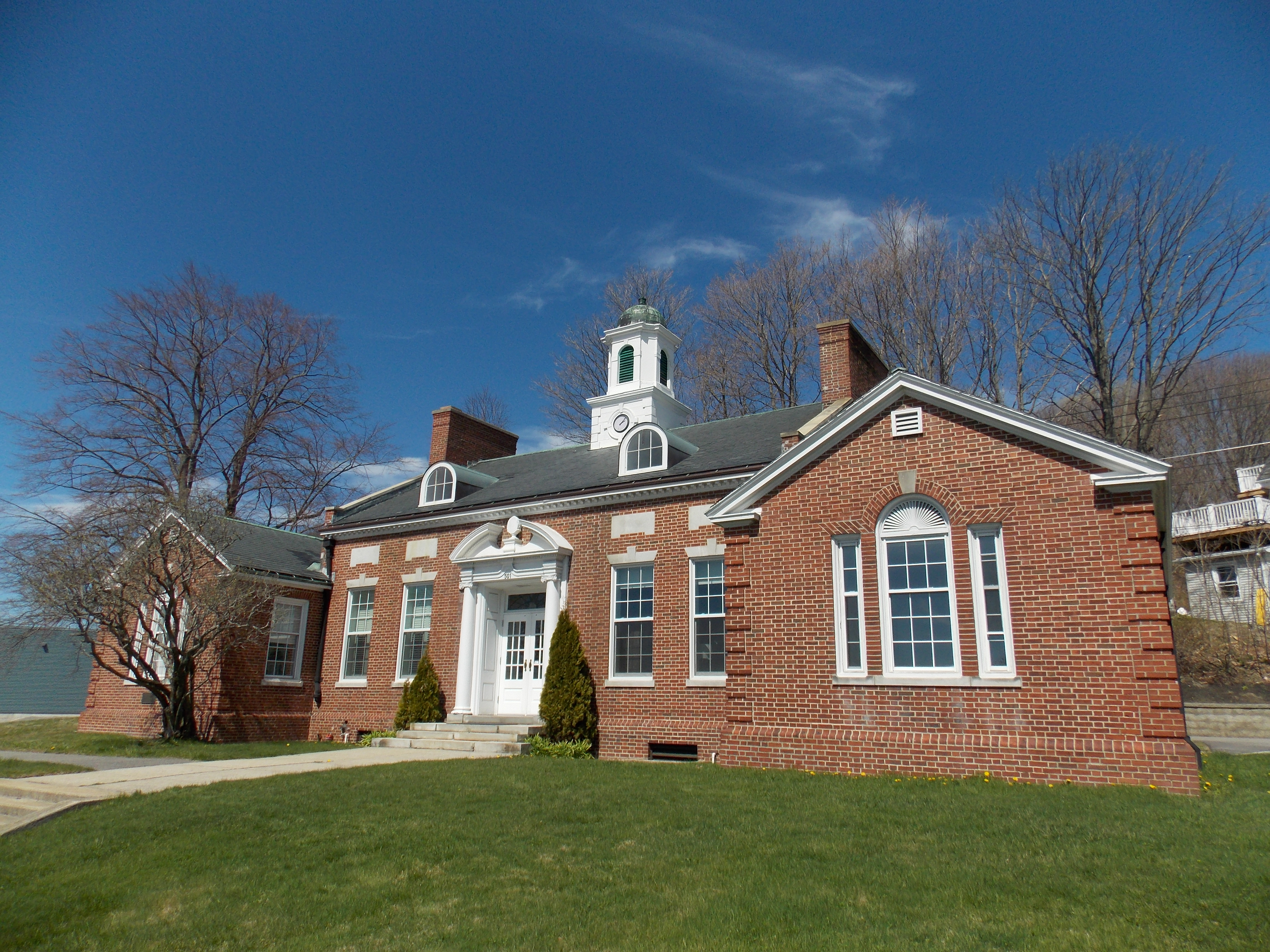

- Location within Maine Location within the United States
- Location: 501 Danforth St. Portland, Maine
- Coordinates: 43°38′38″N 70°16′34″W
- Area: 1.3 acres (0.53 ha)
- Built: 1936
- Architect: John P. Thomas
- Architectural style: Colonial Revival
- NRHP reference No.: 89002344
- Added to NRHP: January 26, 1990

The Maine Publicity Bureau Building is a historic commercial building at 501 Danforth Street in Portland, Maine, United States. Built in 1936, it is a local example of Colonial Revival architecture and was listed on the National Register of Historic Places in 1990 for its association with early formalized efforts by the state to promote tourism.

== Description and history ==
The former Maine Publicity Bureau Building stands below the southernmost end of Portland's Western Promenade, on the northeast side of a 90-degree bend in Danforth Street just before its western end. Although the building stands on a slight rise above Danforth Street, its view of the Fore River is obscured by the raised embankment that carries Commercial Street. The building is a 1-1/2 story brick building with Colonial Revival style, with a five-bay side-gable central section flanked by symmetrical single-story front-gable projecting sections. The flanking sections each have a Palladian-style window group, with narrow fixed windows flanking a central sash that is topped by a half-round fan. The center section has regular sash windows set in rectangular openings with flat keystone lintels. The main entrance is a recessed double door, the opening flanked by pilasters and topped by a broken segmented pediment. The main room of the interior features high-quality woodwork.

The building was designed by Portland architect John P. Thomas and was completed in 1936 with funding support from the Works Progress Administration. The Maine Publicity Bureau was founded in Portland in 1921 by a group of the state's business leaders, as a formalized way to promote the state's business, industrial, and recreational resources. At first located in offices on Congress Street, the group chose this prominent location for a permanent home when it outgrew those facilities. The land and building were owned by the state, and were leased by the Bureau until 1979 when its headquarters was relocated to Hallowell.

On July 28th, 2025, the cupola was damaged by a fire.

== See also ==
- National Register of Historic Places listings in Portland, Maine
