= Gov. Samuel Cony House =

Historic house in Maine, United States

- U.S. National Register of Historic Places
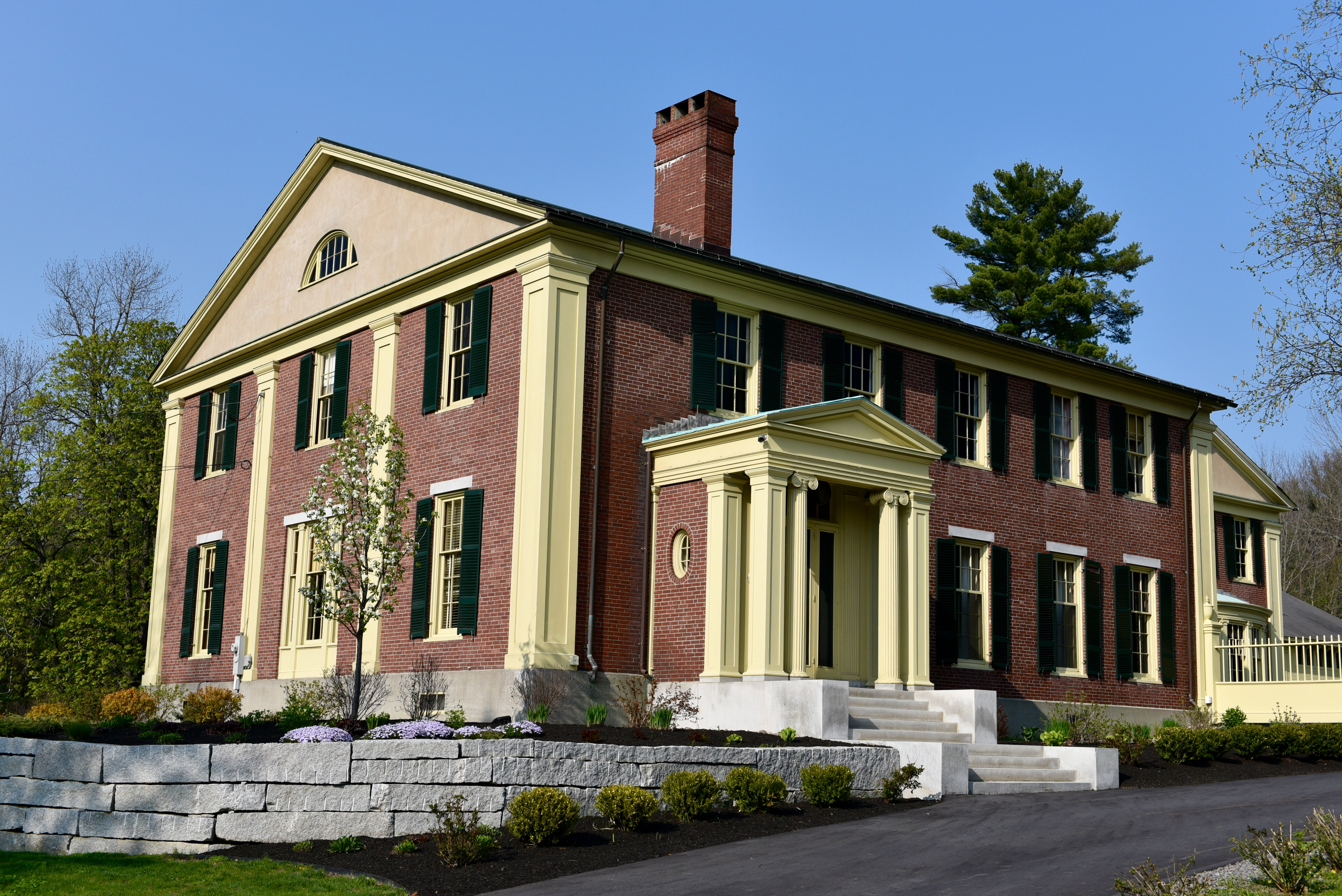

- Location within Maine Location within the United States
- Location: 71 Stone Street, Augusta, Maine
- Coordinates: 44°18′43″N 69°45′50″W
- Built: 1846
- Architect: John P. Thomas, A. J. Davis
- Architectural style: Classical Revival
- NRHP reference No.: 85000732
- Added to NRHP: April 11, 1985

The Governor Samuel Cony House also known as the William Payson Viles House, is an historic house at 71 Stone Street in Augusta, Maine. Built in 1846, it is a fine example of a Greek Revival house altered with Classical Revival features in the 20th century. It was home for 20 years to Samuel Cony, Governor of Maine from 1864 to 1867, and also his son-in-law, Joseph Homan Manley. The house was listed on the National Register of Historic Places in 1985.

== Description and history ==
The Cony House stands on Augusta's east side, on the east side of Stone Street (Maine State Route 9) opposite its junction with Caldwell Street. It is a 2 1/2-story brick structure, with a side gable roof. It is oriented with its main facade to the south, presenting a gable end to the street. That gable end is three bays wide, articulated by pilasters. The front is five bays wide, with the main entrance in the leftmost bay. It is set in a single-story projecting section, with a fully pedimented gable and entablature supported by paired columns, one a square paneled Doric column, the other a fluted round Ionic column. The interior retains most of its original woodwork.

The house was built in 1846, and was from 1850 until his death in 1870 the home of Samuel Cony. Cony was long active in state politics, notably serving as Governor of Maine during the later years of the American Civil War. Following his death, it was home to Joseph Homan Manley, who had married his daughter. Manley was a prominent Republican political operative, who served in the state legislature. The house was designed by Alexander Jackson Davis, a leading American architect of the period, with alterations made about 1930 by John P. Thomas.

== See also ==
- National Register of Historic Places listings in Kennebec County, Maine
