= Bayville, Maine =

Village in the town of Boothbay Harbor in Lincoln County, Maine

Coordinates: 43°51′35″N 69°36′10″W

Bayville is a village in the town of Boothbay Harbor in Lincoln County, Maine, United States.

The village of Bayville was formed in 1911. Bayville consists largely of summer residents and has approximately 43 houses at the head of Linekin Bay. The Bayville lineage of several families stretches back some six generations or more.
