= Gardiner Public Library =

Coordinates: 44.227°N 69.7635°W

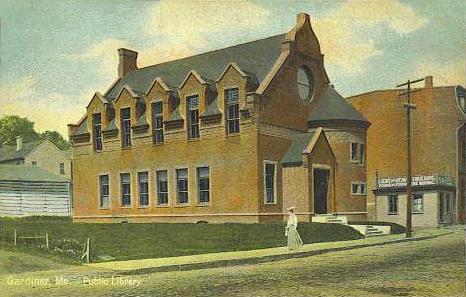
- Location: 152 Water Street; Gardiner, Maine, United States
- Type: Public
- Established: 1881

Collection
- Size: 45,000

Access and use
- Circulation: 108,000
- Population served: 17,336

Other information
- Budget: $320,749
- Director: Justin Hoenke
- Employees: 9

The Gardiner Public Library is the public library of Gardiner, Maine, and the surrounding communities of Farmingdale, Litchfield, Pittston, Randolph, and West Gardiner. The present library was built in 1881 and designed by architect Henry Richards. In 1930 the R.P. Hazzard wing was added to become the Children's Room, but was later converted to a Reading Room. In 1960 the J. Walter Robinson Reference Wing was added, and in 1977 the Burress Moore, III Children's Room was created using the second floor of the library, which had originally been designed as a public hall known as Library Hall. The Children's Room renovations were finished in 2008. The Community Archives Room was established in 1985 in the basement level of the library. It was renovated in 2016 and serves as the community's local history and genealogy center.
