= William Leavitt (musician) =

American jazz musician

- Leavitt holding a Gibson Archtop guitar, 1952
- Born: William George Leavitt; October 4, 1926; Flint, Michigan, U.S.
- Died: November 4, 1990 (aged 64); Framingham, Massachusetts, U.S.
- Other name: Bill Leavitt
- Citizenship: United States
- Education: Schillinger House (graduated 1951)
- Occupations: Jazz guitarist; arranger; music educator; author
- Employer: Berklee College of Music (1965–1990)
- Known for: Authoring A Modern Method for Guitar (Volumes 1–3)
- Notable work: A Modern Method for Guitar; Melodic Rhythms for Guitar; Reading Studies for Guitar
- Title: Chair of the Guitar Department, Berklee College of Music

William "Bill" G. Leavitt (October 4, 1926 – November 4, 1990) was an American jazz guitarist and arranger best known for his long series of guitar instruction books and for developing a related curriculum at Berklee College of Music as chair of the guitar department.

== Method books ==
In 1965, Leavitt succeeded Jack Petersen as chair of Berklee's Guitar Department, a role he held until 1990. Drawing on his background as a studio guitarist and arranger, Leavitt sought to establish a formal, college-level pedagogy for pick-style (plectrum) guitar—which was largely absent from higher music education at the time—to prepare students for professional session, broadcast, and orchestral work through rigorous sight-reading and fretboard mastery.

Leavitt's books contain no guitar tablature and consist only of standard notation and chord symbols with occasionally written-in fingering numbers, string numbers, and position numerals. They range in level from the beginning reader to the professional.

Emphasis is placed on using a guitar pick, rather than a fingerstyle approach. At the time, although many players were using picks, very few college-level educational materials existed that were specifically designed with the pick-style in mind.

With the exception of Classical Studies for Pick-Style Guitar, all of Leavitt's published studies are originals. This differs from many method books that include "old favourites." Leavitt emphasizes that when learning how to read music, students must be presented with music they don't already know.

== Books ==
- A Modern Method for Guitar Volume 1 (Berklee Press, ISBN 0-7935-4511-0)
- A Modern Method for Guitar Volume 2 (Berklee Press, ISBN 0-87639-015-7)
- A Modern Method for Guitar Volume 3 (Berklee Press, ISBN 0-87639-017-3)
- Berklee Basic Guitar - Phase 1 (Berklee Press, ISBN 0-634-01333-5)
- Berklee Basic Guitar - Phase 2 (Berklee Press, ISBN 0-7935-5526-4)
- Melodic Rhythms for Guitar (Berklee Press, ISBN 0-634-01332-7)
- Reading Studies for Guitar (Berklee Press, ISBN 0-634-01335-1)
- Advanced Reading Studies for Guitar (Berklee Press, ISBN 0-634-01337-8)
- Classical Studies for Pick-Style Guitar (Berklee Press, ISBN 0-634-01339-4)
