= Boothbay Harbor, Maine =

Boothbay Harbor
- Town
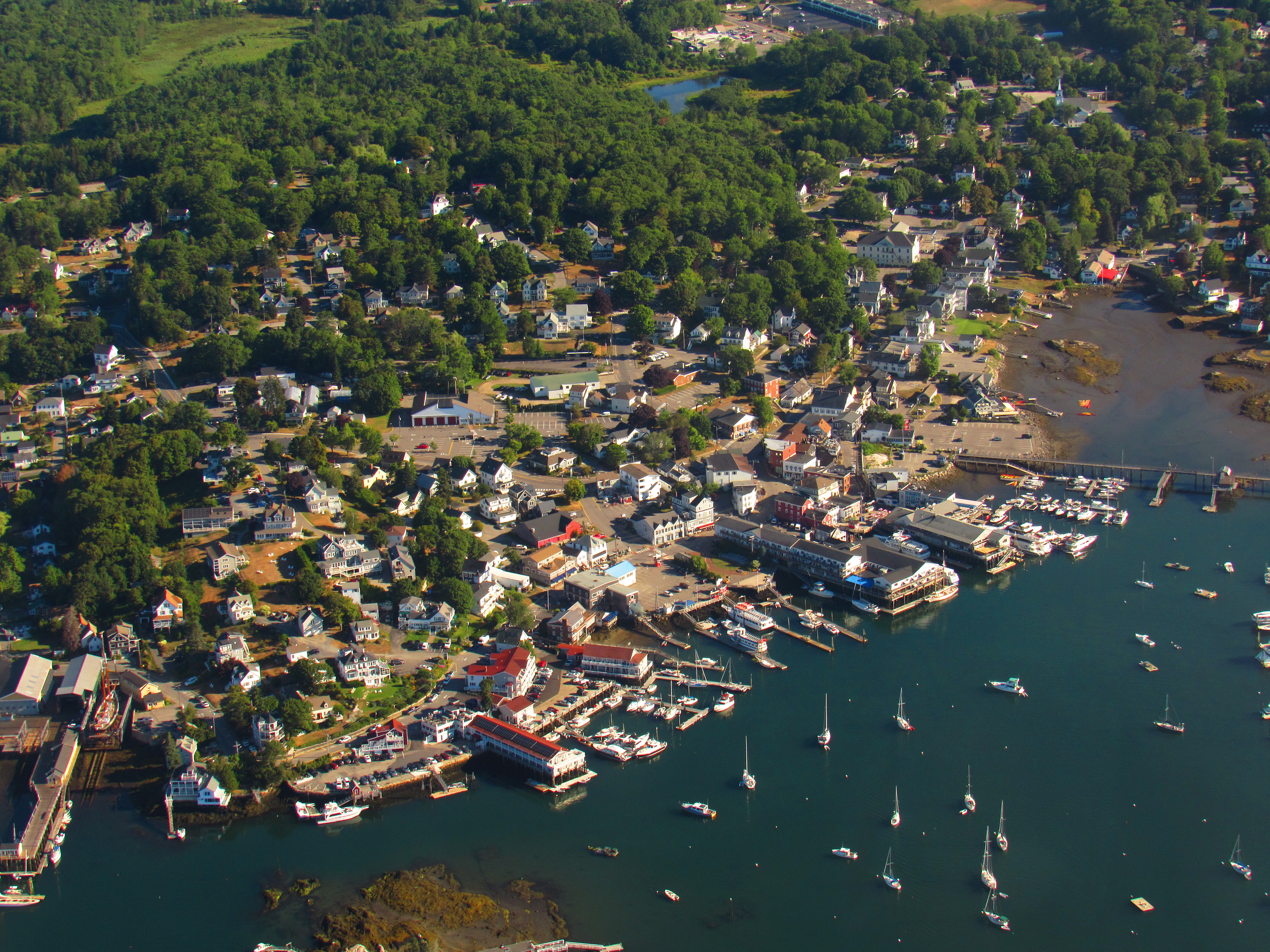
- Boothbay Harbor aerial photo

- Seal

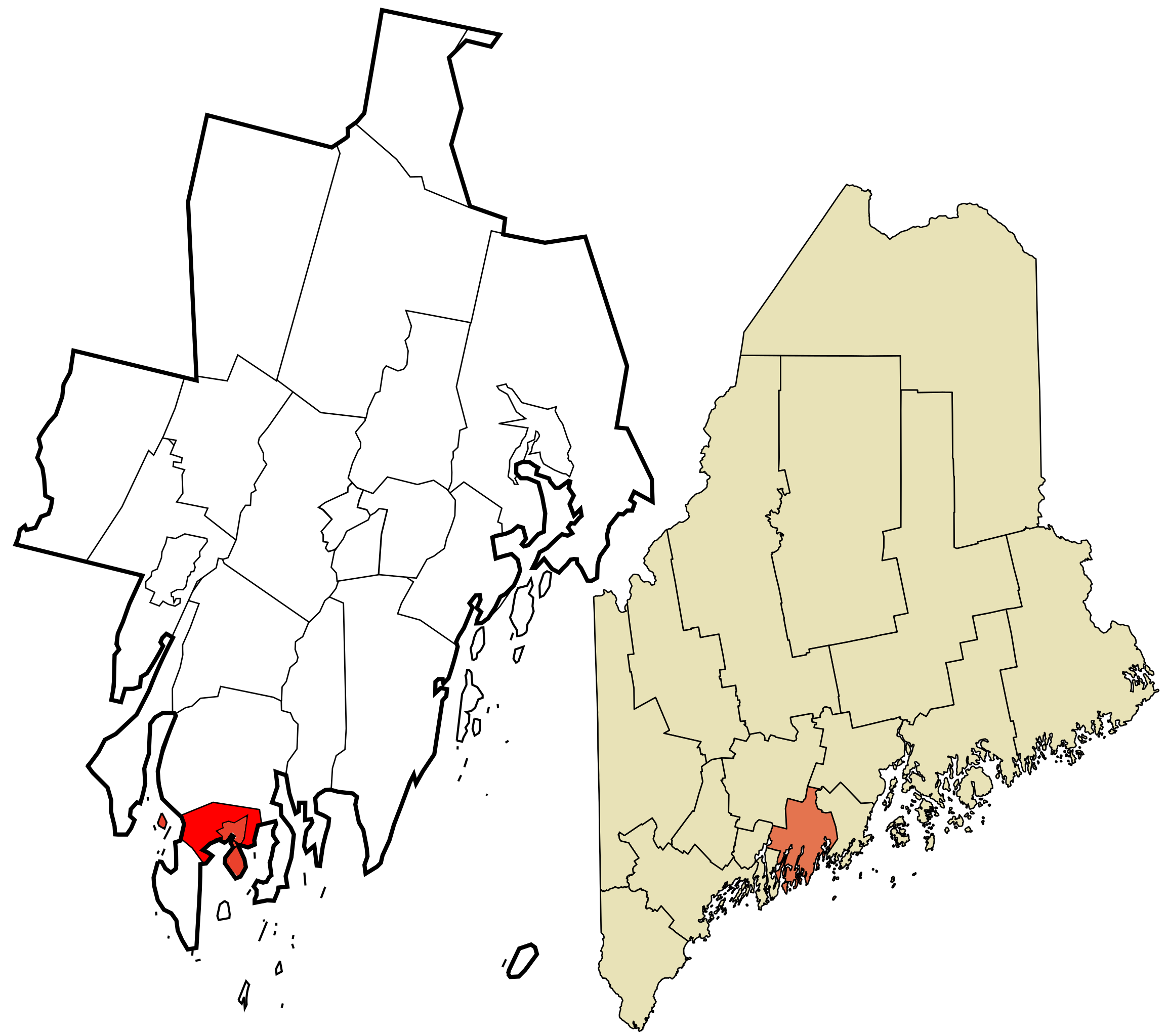
- Location in Lincoln County and the state of Maine
- Coordinates: 43°51′02″N 69°37′40″W
- Country: United States
- State: Maine
- County: Lincoln
- Incorporated: 1889

Area
  - Total: 9.22 sq mi (23.87 km^{2})
  - Land: 5.70 sq mi (14.76 km^{2})
  - Water: 3.52 sq mi (9.11 km^{2})
- Elevation: 40 ft (12 m)

Population (2020)
  - Total: 2,027
  - Density: 380/sq mi (146.7/km^{2})
- Time zone: UTC-5 (Eastern (EST))
  - Summer (DST): UTC-4 (EDT)
- ZIP Codes: 04538 (Boothbay Harbor); 04575 (West Boothbay Harbor); 04549 (Isle of Springs)
- Area code: 207
- FIPS code: 23-015-06120
- GNIS feature ID: 582359
- Website: boothbayharbor.org

Boothbay Harbor is a town in Lincoln County, Maine, United States. The population was 2,027 at the 2020 census. It includes the neighborhoods of Mount Pisgah, and Sprucewold, the Bayville and West Boothbay Harbor villages, the Isle of Springs summer colony, and the Boothbay Harbor census-designated place. Boothbay Harbor is surrounded by the larger town of Boothbay.

== History ==
The Abenaki people that lived in the region called it Winnegance. The first European presence in the region was an English fishing outpost called Cape Newagen in 1623. An Englishman by the name of Henry Curtis purchased the right to settle Winnegance from the Abenaki Sachem Mowhotiwormet in 1666. However, the English were driven from their settlements by the Abenaki in 1676 during King Philip's War in 1676. The colonists returned after the war ended. In 1689 during King William's War, they were driven out again. Winnegance was abandoned entirely, and remained a desolate waste for 40 years.

In 1730, Colonel David Dunbar, the superintendent and governor of the Territory of Sagadahock, formed a new settlement, named Townsend after Lord Charles Townshend. In 1764, the settlement was officially incorporated as the town of Boothbay. Despite predations during the French and Indian Wars, and robberies during the Revolutionary War by marauding British sailors, the settlement was successful, not least because of its large, deep and protected harbor. During the Penobscot Expedition in 1779, Boothbay became a rendezvous point for the American naval fleet prior to its disastrous encounter with the British at Castine.

In 1842, Townsend, now called Southport, split from Boothbay and was incorporated as its own town. The harbor continued to develop as a fishing center. In bad weather, it could hold at a time between 400 and 500 vessels, often Friendship Sloops, seeking shelter. By 1881, it had a fishery and fish oil company, an ice company, two marine railways, a fertilizer manufacturer, and a factory for canning lobsters. On February 16, 1889, the community was set off from Boothbay and incorporated as the town of Boothbay Harbor. Frank L. Sample shipyard at Boothbay Harbor built minesweepers for the United States Navy during World War II and into the 1950s. Some location filming for the 1956 movie version of Rodgers and Hammerstein's Carousel, notably the "June Is Bustin' Out All Over" sequence, was done there. Each summer, Boothbay Harbor draws crowds of tourists. Attractions include the state aquarium, art galleries, restaurants, boat tours to coastal islands and whale watching.

== Geography ==
The town is in southern Lincoln County, at the south end of a peninsula in the Gulf of Maine, part of the Atlantic Ocean. It is bordered to the west by the tidal Sheepscot River and to the east by Linekin Bay. The town center sits at the north end of Boothbay Harbor, which joins Linekin Bay to the south, past Spruce Point. Townsend Gut, to the southwest, separates the town of Boothbay Harbor from Southport Island. The town is bordered to the north and east by the town of Boothbay, to the south by the town of Southport, and to the west, across the Sheepscot River, by the towns of Westport and Georgetown. The island community of Isle of Springs is in the western part of the town, and West Boothbay Harbor is in the west-central part of the town. Bayville is next to the eastern border of the town, close to East Boothbay.

The town is crossed by state routes 27 and 96. Route 27 leads south into Southport and north 13 miles (21 km) to Wiscasset. Route 96 leads east 2 miles (3 km) to the village of East Boothbay and 5 miles (8 km) to its end at Ocean Point.

According to the United States Census Bureau, the town of Boothbay Harbor has a total area of 9.22 square miles (23.88 km^{2}), of which 5.70 square miles (14.76 km^{2}) are land and 3.52 square miles (9.12 km^{2}), or 38.17%, are water.

=== Climate ===
Climate data for Boothbay Harbor (Newcastle Weather Station)
Month	Jan	Feb	Mar	Apr	May	Jun	Jul	Aug	Sep	Oct	Nov	Dec	Year
Mean daily maximum °F (°C)	29.7 (−1.3)	33.1 (0.6)	41.5 (5.3)	53.2 (11.8)	65.3 (18.5)	73.2 (22.9)	78.6 (25.9)	76.9 (24.9)	67.8 (19.9)	56.8 (13.8)	45.3 (7.4)	34.4 (1.3)	54.6 (12.6)
Mean daily minimum °F (°C)	12.1 (−11.1)	15.4 (−9.2)	24.5 (−4.2)	34.0 (1.1)	44.0 (6.7)	52.5 (11.4)	58.3 (14.6)	57.3 (14.1)	49.5 (9.7)	39.4 (4.1)	30.5 (−0.8)	18.5 (−7.5)	36.3 (2.4)
Average precipitation inches (mm)	4.35 (110)	3.22 (82)	4.42 (112)	4.24 (108)	4.00 (102)	3.58 (91)	3.11 (79)	2.75 (70)	3.83 (97)	4.10 (104)	4.70 (119)	4.63 (118)	46.93 (1,192)
Source: NOAA

== Demographics ==
Historical population
Census	Pop.	Note	%±
1890	1,699		—
1900	1,926		13.4%
1910	2,021		4.9%
1920	2,025		0.2%
1930	2,076		2.5%
1940	2,121		2.2%
1950	2,290		8.0%
1960	2,252		−1.7%
1970	2,320		3.0%
1980	2,207		−4.9%
1990	2,347		6.3%
2000	2,334		−0.6%
2010	2,165		−7.2%
2020	2,027		−6.4%
U.S. Decennial Census

=== 2010 census ===
As of the census of 2010, there were 2,165 people, 1,084 households, and 550 families residing in the town. The population density was 379.8 inhabitants per square mile (146.6/km^{2}). There were 2,175 housing units at an average density of 381.6 per square mile (147.3/km^{2}). The racial makeup of the town was 97.1% White, 0.6% African American or Black, 0.3% Native American, 0.8% Asian, 0.1% from other races, and 1.2% from two or more races. Latino of any race were 0.7% of the population.

There were 1,084 households, of which 14.9% had children under the age of 18 living with them, 40.9% were married couples living together, 7.3% had a female householder with no husband present, 2.6% had a male householder with no wife present, and 49.3% were non-families. 41.8% of all households were made up of individuals, and 22.6% had someone living alone who was 65 years of age or older. The average household size was 1.90 and the average family size was 2.52.

The median age in the town was 55.8 years. 11.6% of residents were under the age of 18; 5.4% were between the ages of 18 and 24; 16.6% were from 25 to 44; 33.3% were from 45 to 64; and 33.2% were 65 years of age or older. The gender makeup of the town was 45.5% male and 54.5% female.

=== 2000 census ===
As of the census of 2000, there were 2,334 people, 1,097 households, and 627 families residing in the town. The population density was 404.3 inhabitants per square mile (156.1/km^{2}). There were 1,993 housing units at an average density of 345.2 per square mile (133.3/km^{2}). The racial makeup of the town was 97.9% White, 0.2% Black or African American, 0.30% Native American, 0.73% Asian, 0.34% from other races, and 0.56% from two or more races. Hispanic or Latino of any race were 0.90% of the population.

There were 1,097 households, out of which 21.9% had children under the age of 18 living with them, 46.4% were married couples living together, 8.4% had a female householder with no husband present, and 42.8% were non-families. 36.6% of all households were made up of individuals, and 18.4% had someone living alone who was 65 years of age or older. The average household size was 2.05 and the average family size was 2.67.

In the town, the population was spread out, with 17.4% under the age of 18, 5.4% from 18 to 24, 22.9% from 25 to 44, 28.3% from 45 to 64, and 26.0% who were 65 years of age or older. The median age was 48 years. For every 100 females, there were 84.2 males. For every 100 females age 18 and over, there were 81.9 males.

The median income for a household in the town was $35,000, and the median income for a family was $45,000. Males had a median income of $30,000 versus $21,000 for females. The per capita income for the town was $21,146. About 5.9% of families and 10.7% of the population were below the poverty line, including 16.7% of those under age 18 and 8.7% of those age 65 or over.

== Media ==
The local newspaper for the Boothbay Region is the Boothbay Register. The Lincoln County News also circulates in Boothbay Harbor. The Portland Press Herald provides daily newspaper coverage.

== Sites of interest ==
- Auld-McCobb House
- Bayville
- Boothbay Harbor Memorial Library
- Boothbay Region High School
- Opera House at Boothbay Harbor
- Sprucewold Lodge
- West Boothbay Harbor

== Notable people ==
- Nancy Hemenway Barton, artist
- Arthur Bradford, writer and filmmaker
- Lansing Campbell, illustrator
- Charles H. Chapman, jazz musician
- Mabel Conkling, sculptor
- Ralph Fuller, cartoonist
- Raymond A. Hare, American diplomat
- Elle Logan, rower
- Terry Morrison, politician
- Anning Smith Prall, politician
- George Lincoln Rockwell, neo-Nazi activist
- Tim Sample, humorist
- Stanley R. Tupper, politician
- Michael van der Veen, attorney
- Arthur Valpey, American football player and coach
- Clarence Wilkinson, politician
- Jay Zeamer Jr., US Army Air Forces pilot and Medal of Honor recipient

== Gallery ==
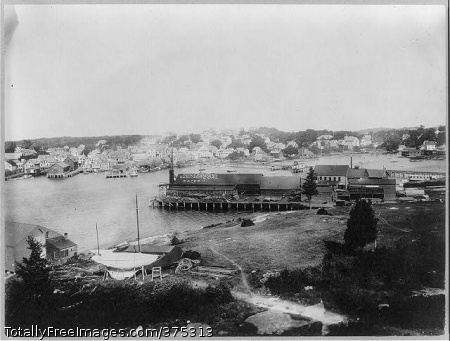
Boothbay Harbor c. 1910

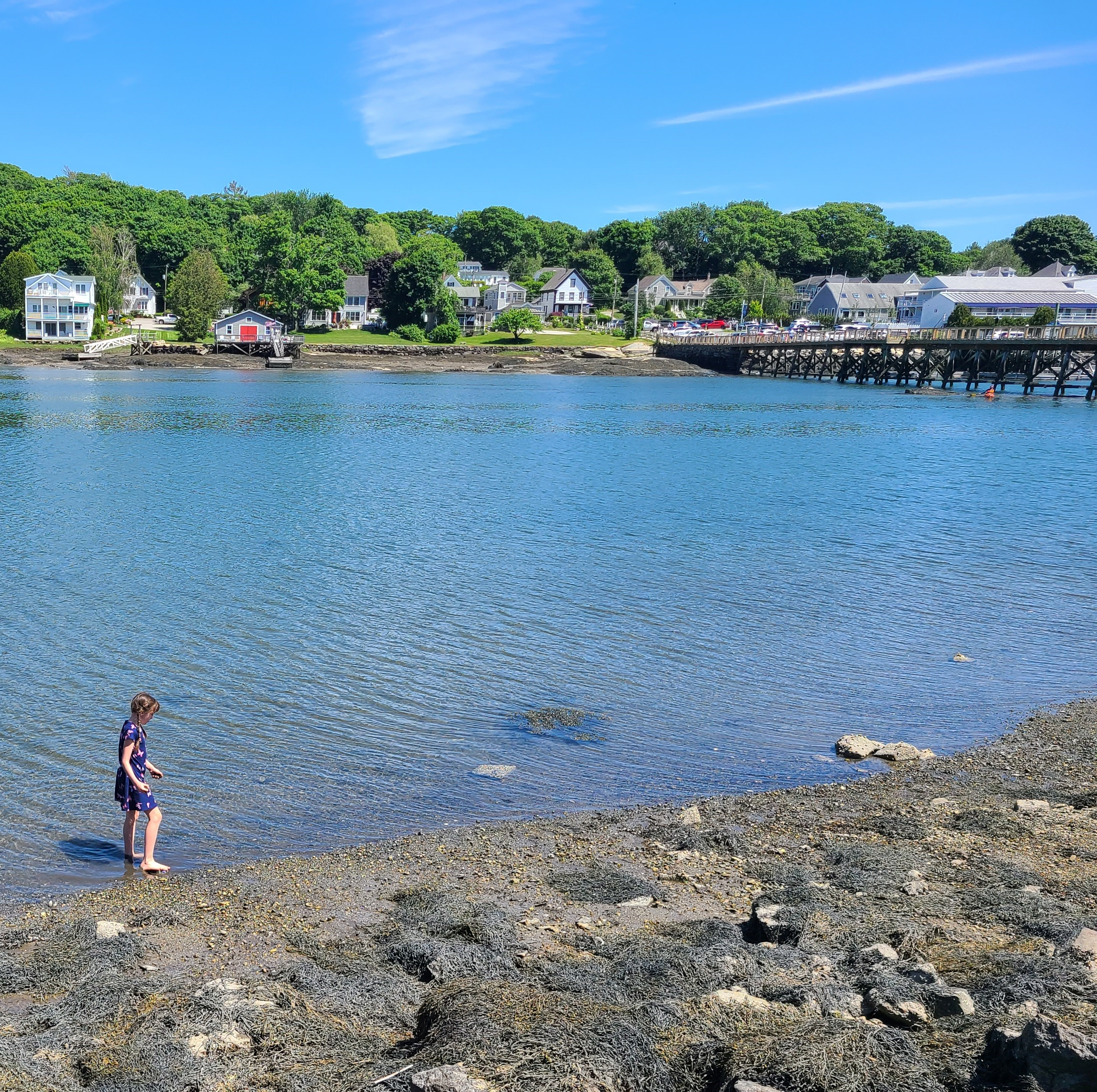
Boothbay Harbor, Maine in 2024

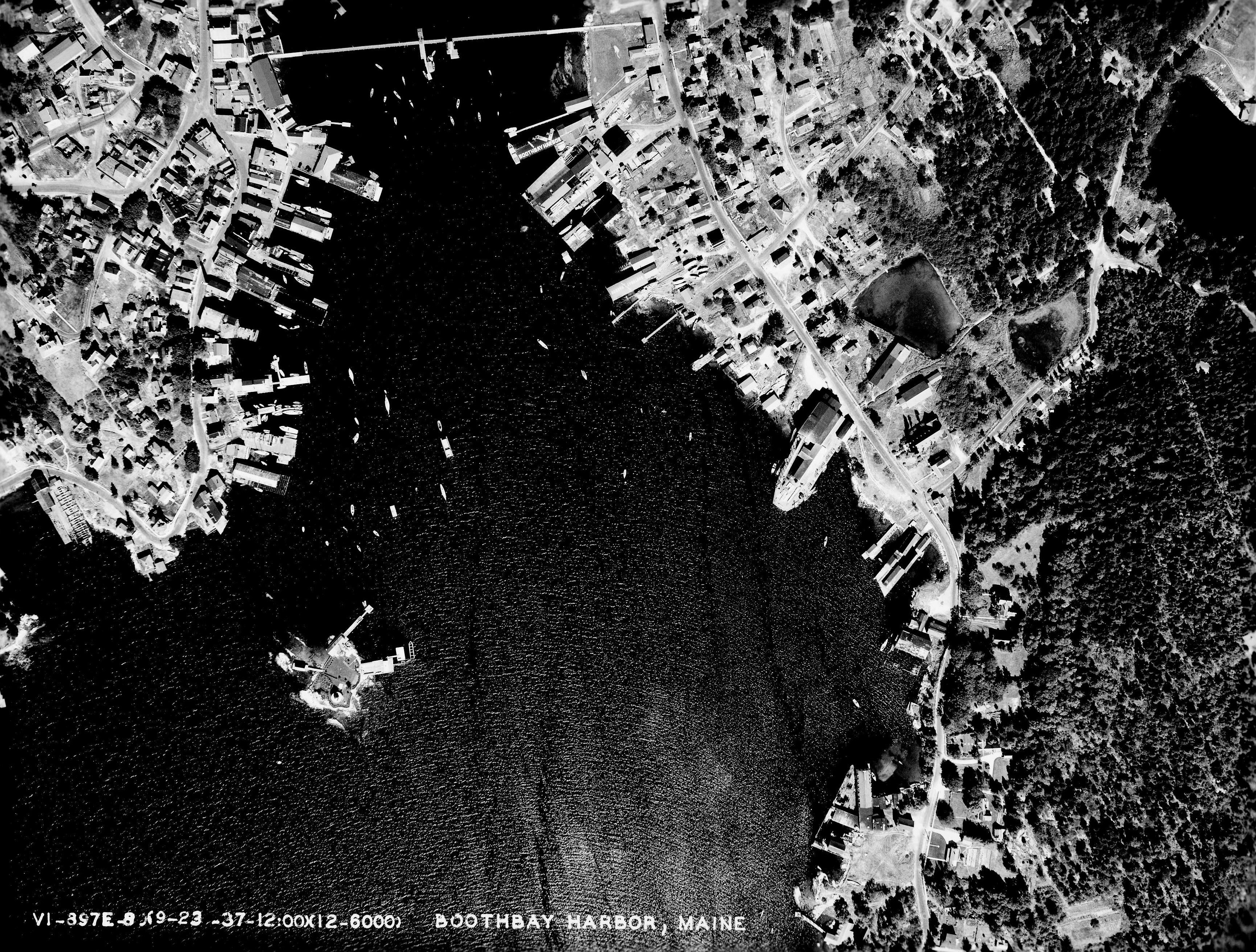
Boothbay Harbor in 1938

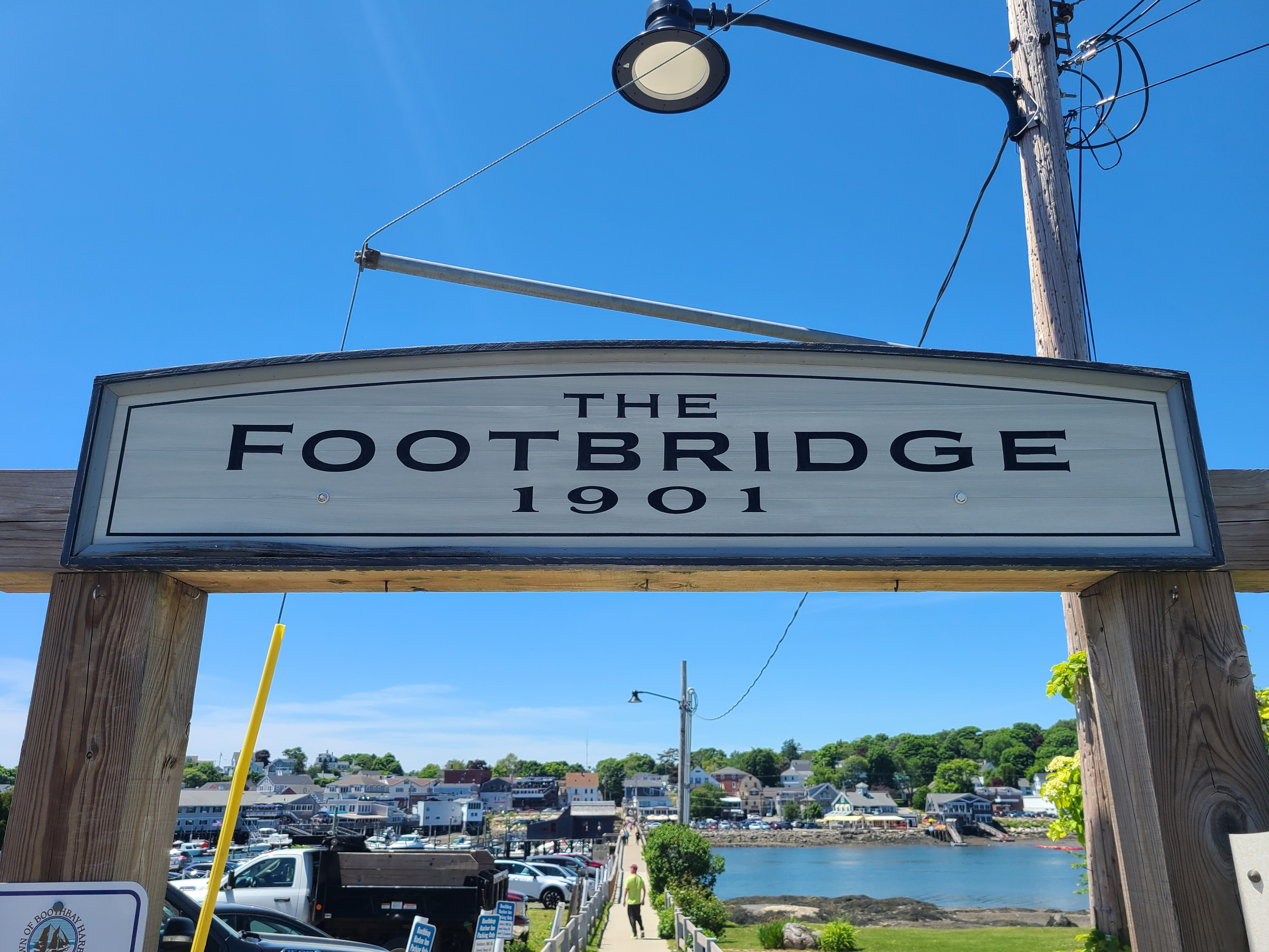
Footbridge at Boothbay Harbor, Maine

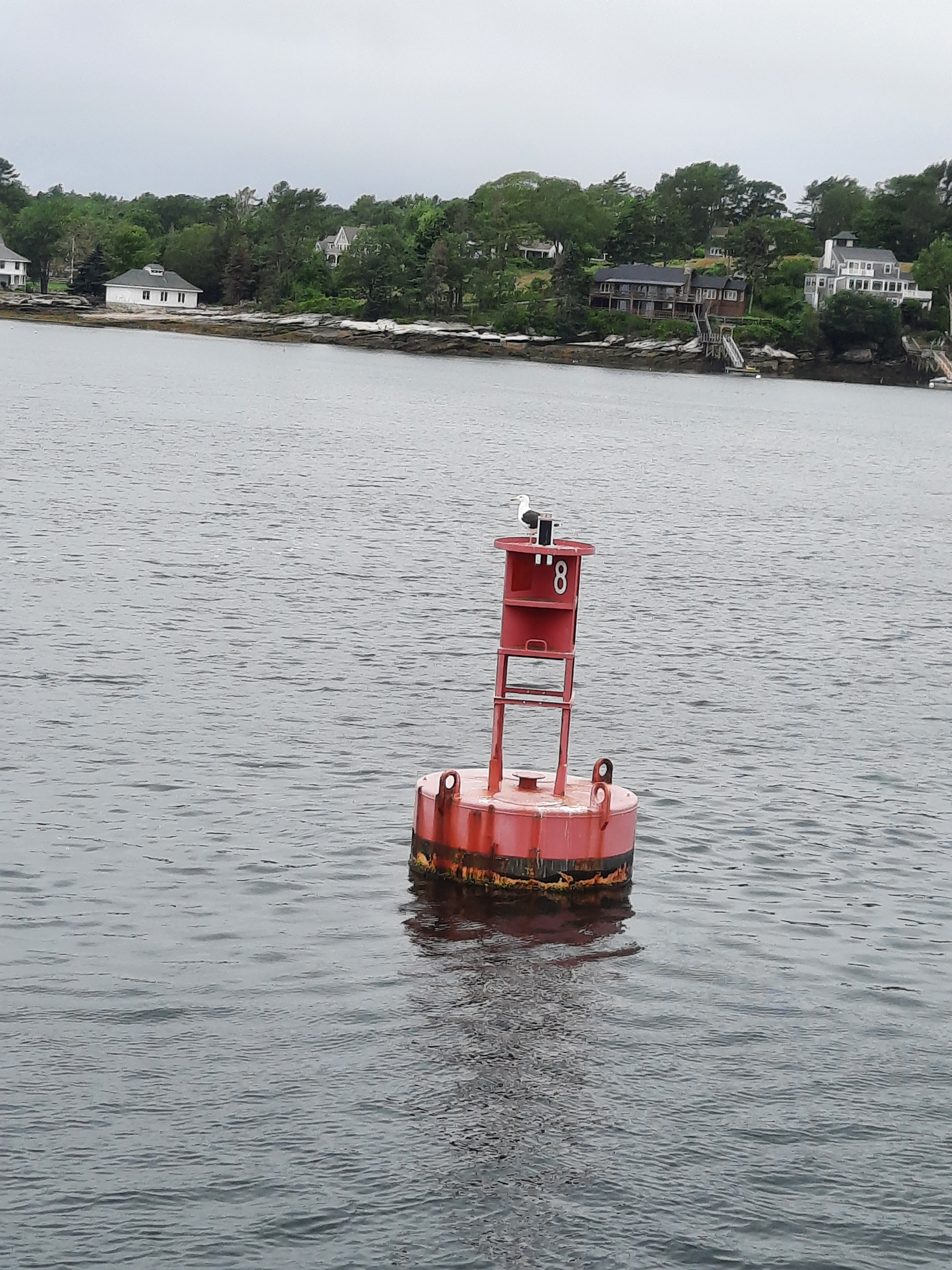
Boothbay Harbor, Maine

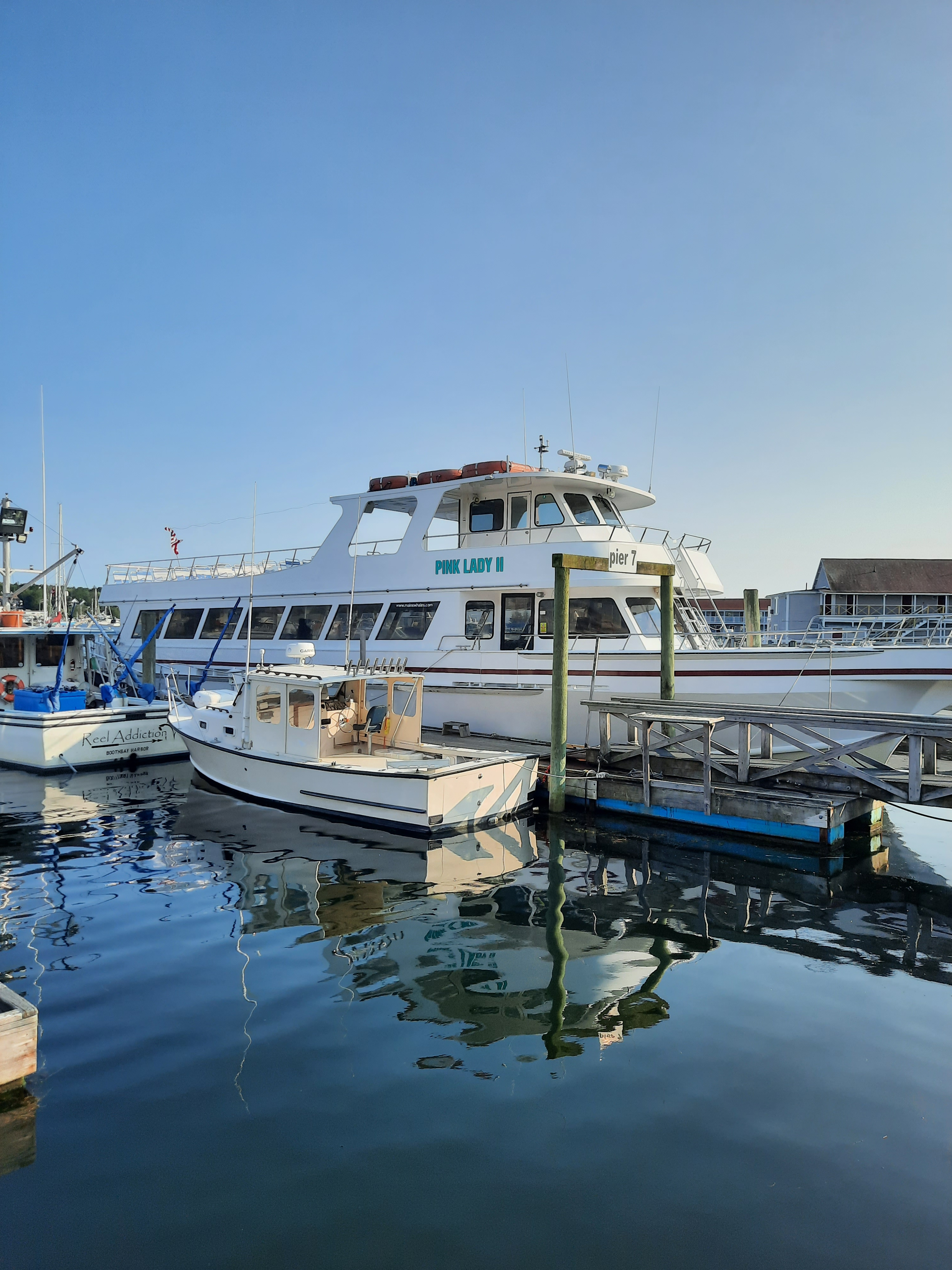
Ferries in Boothbay Harbor, Maine
