= Abner Coburn =

American politician

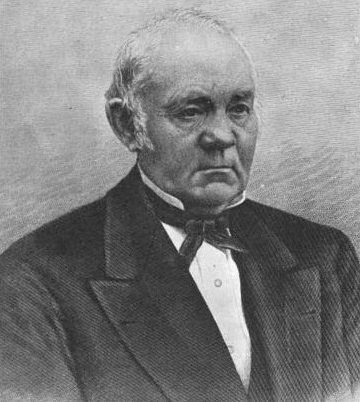

30th Governor of Maine
- In office January 7, 1863 – January 6, 1864
- Preceded by: Israel Washburn, Jr.
- Succeeded by: Samuel Cony

Member of the Maine House of Representatives
- In office 1860–1863

Personal details
- Born: March 22, 1803 Skowhegan, Massachusetts (now Maine), US
- Died: January 4, 1885 (aged 81) Skowhegan, Maine, US

Abner Coburn (March 22, 1803 – January 4, 1885) was the 30th governor of Maine from 1863 to 1864 and a prominent individual in Skowhegan, Maine until his death.

== Early years ==
Coburn was born on a farm in Old Canaan (later renamed to Skowhegan). He was raised with Puritan values and worked on his family farm from a young age which lead to him being known as an exceedingly industrious man.

== Career ==
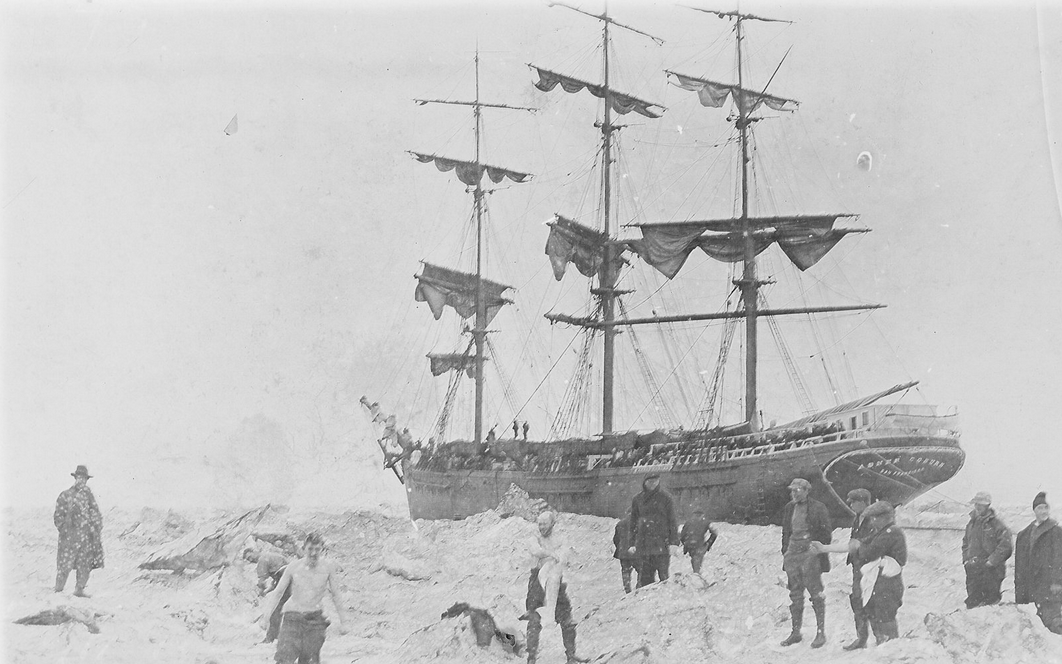
Sailing Vessel Abner Coburn

Coburn's family were Federalists and he cast his first vote for president in 1824 for John Quincy Adams. He went on to join the Whig Party and was an early member of the Maine Republican Party. Coburn served three years in the Maine House of Representatives before being elected Governor in 1863. He called for prisoners at the Maine State Prison to be leased to contractors instead of the State itself using them for manufacturing. He became prominent in Skowhegan society, serving as the president of Skowhegan Savings Bank and becoming president and director of the Maine Central Railroad. He served as the Chair of the Colby College Board of Trustees from 1874 until his death in 1885. He was the uncle of the writer Louise Helen Coburn. Many of his historical items can be seen in a museum she began, the Skowhegan History House.

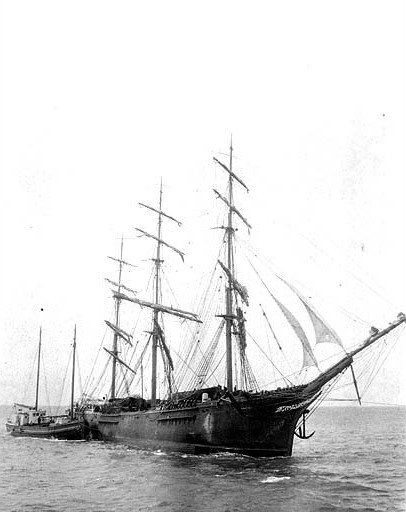
The Abner Coburn being towed from the Bering Sea, May 1918

Upon his death in 1885, Coburn left 12 acres (49,000 m^{2}) to the town of Skowhegan land for a public park. Coburn Park opened in 1907. Abner Coburn's life and achievements as governor were honored with the naming of a sailing ship.

Party political offices
Preceded by Israel Washburn Jr.	Republican nominee for Governor of Maine; 1862	Succeeded by Samuel Cony
Political offices
Preceded by Israel Washburn, Jr.	Governor of Maine; 1863–1864	Succeeded by Samuel Cony
