= Samuel Cony =

American politician

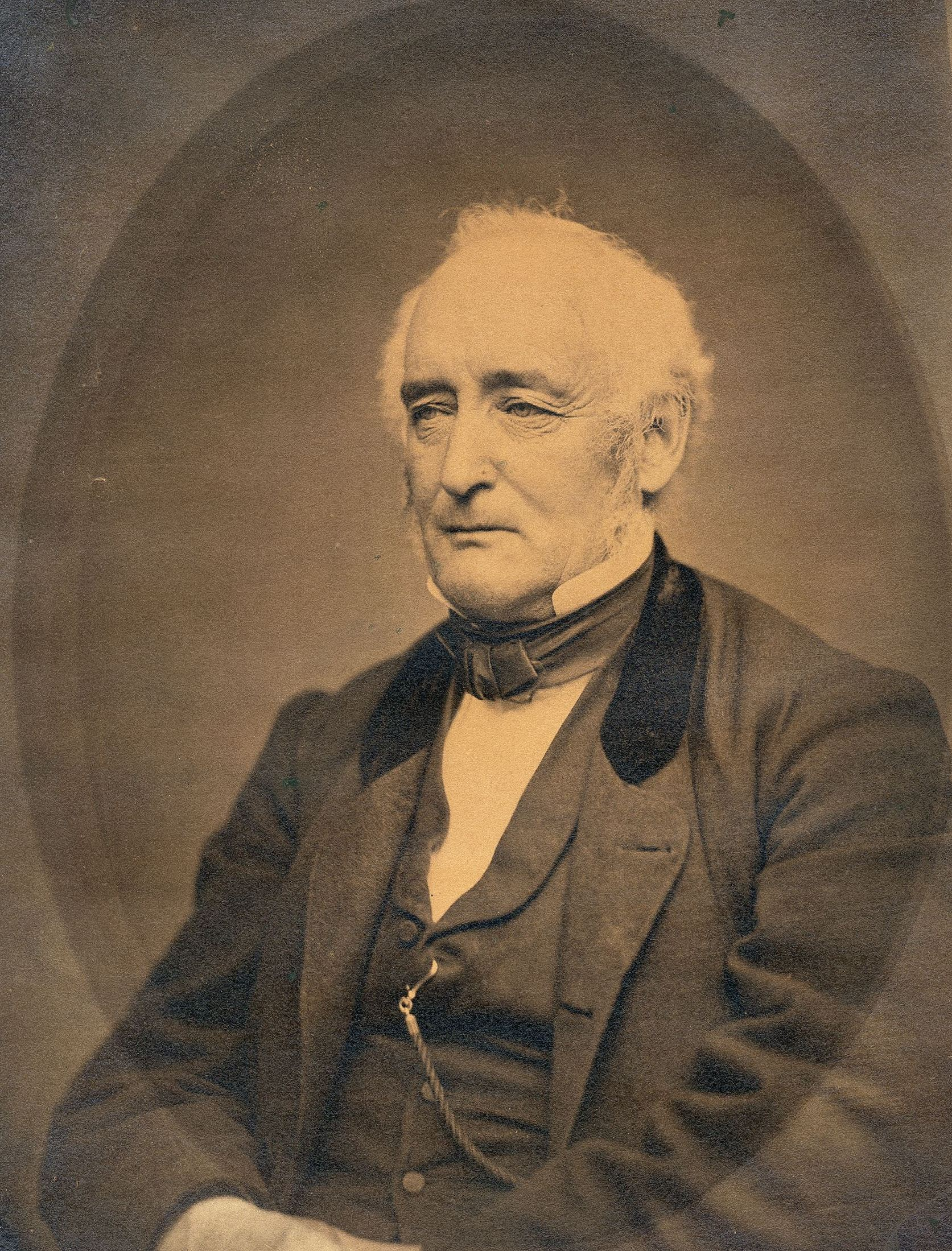

31st Governor of Maine
- In office January 6, 1864 – January 2, 1867
- Preceded by: Abner Coburn
- Succeeded by: Joshua L. Chamberlain

Treasurer of Maine
- In office 1850–1854
- Preceded by: Moses Macdonald
- Succeeded by: Woodbury Davis

Member of the Maine House of Representatives
- In office 1835–1836; 1863

Personal details
- Born: February 27, 1811 Augusta, Massachusetts, U.S. (now Maine)
- Died: October 5, 1870 (aged 59) Augusta, Maine, U.S.
- Party: Republican
- Spouse(s): Mercy H. Sewall and Lucy W. Brooks (married twice)
- Education: Brown University
- Profession: Attorney

Samuel Cony (February 27, 1811 – October 5, 1870) was an American politician, who most notably served as the 31st governor of Maine from 1864 to 1867.

== Early years ==
Cony was born in Augusta (in modern-day Maine, then a part of Massachusetts) on February 27, 1811, the son of Susan Bowdoin (Coney) and Samuel Cony. He studied at the China Academy and Wakefield College. He graduated from Brown University in 1829. He then studied law with future U.S. Congressman Hiram Belcher, of Farmington and also with his uncle, future U.S. Senator Reuel Williams of Augusta.

== Career in law ==
Cony was admitted to the bar in 1832. He opened an office in Old Town, Maine. He served as a judge of the Probate Court for Penobscot County, Maine from 1840 to 1846.

== Early political career ==
Cony was originally a Democrat and served as a member of the Maine House of Representatives from 1835 to 1836 from Penobscot County. He also served as a member of the governor's executive council (1839), the land agent for Maine (1847–1850). In 1850 he left Old Town for Augusta when he was appointed state treasurer of Maine (1850–1854). He subsequently became mayor of Augusta (1854). He joined the Republican Party in 1862, which had then become ascendant in Maine politics. He was re-elected to the Maine House of Representatives, now representing a district in Kennebec County, and served for one term.

== Governor of Maine ==
Cony was nominated by the Maine Republican Party as their candidate for governor and was elected governor by a popular vote in 1863. He was elected governor three times. During his administration, troops and provisions continued to be raised for the American Civil War. Maine sent more than 70,000 men to the front. The Executive of the State issued 4,295 commissions, of which Cony signed about 1,400. Cony announced that he would not accept another nomination in his inaugural address at the opening of the legislature in January 1866. He left office on January 2, 1867.

== Personal life ==
Cony married twice. He married Mercy H. Sewall on October 17, 1833. She died April 9, 1847. He then married Lucy W. Brooks on November 22, 1849. He had six children. He was a Congregationalist. His home on Stone Street in Augusta, the Gov. Samuel Cony House, has been listed on the National Register of Historic Places since 1985.

== See also ==
- List of mayors of Augusta, Maine

== Sources ==
- Sobel, Robert and John Raimo. Biographical Directory of the Governors of the United States, 1789-1978. Greenwood Press, 1988. ISBN 0-313-28093-2
- "Governor Samuel Cony".

Party political offices
Preceded by Abner Coburn	Republican nominee for Governor of Maine; 1863, 1864, 1865	Succeeded by Joshua Chamberlain
Political offices
Preceded by Moses Macdonald	Treasurer of Maine; 1850–1854	Succeeded by Woodbury Davis
Preceded by Abner Coburn	Governor of Maine; 1864–1867	Succeeded by Joshua L. Chamberlain
