= Sarah Fraser Robbins =

American writer and educator

Sarah Fraser Robbins (December 27, 1911 – February 9, 2002) was an American writer and educator in the field of natural history and a dedicated environmentalist.

Her scientific specialty was the creatures that inhabit the shallow waters of the seacoast of Massachusetts. She was a fervent birder as well. She was the first director of education at the Peabody Museum of Salem, 1971–1981. She spent many years before and after that time exploring the dwellers of the waters, littoral zone, and sky near her house in Gloucester, Massachusetts. For almost twenty years she served on the board of directors of the Massachusetts Audubon Society and contributed regular columns to the Society's magazines. She was also a member of the Society of Woman Geographers, an elite group of adventurers and travelers. She rode elephants to see tigers in India, flew over the Alps in a hot-air balloon, and fished in Afghanistan.

== Early life, education, and marriage ==
Sarah Fraser was the youngest of five children, one boy and four girls, of George Corning Fraser (born February 25, 1872, in New York City, died November 15, 1935, in Dallas, Texas) and Jane Gardener Tutt (born August 4, 1874, in Danville, Kentucky, died December 25, 1936, in New York City). They were married December 5, 1895, in St. Louis, Missouri. Sarah was born in Morristown, New Jersey, on December 27, 1911. Almost a fifty-year resident of Gloucester, she died in Boston on February 9, 2002, at the age of 90.

Sarah's father was a lawyer in New York City and amateur geologist by avocation. He had a great spirit of wanderlust that he passed on to his children. He enjoyed taking his daughters on summer field trips to the western United States, especially Utah.

Sarah was educated at Brearley School in New York City, became a debutante, and was honored at a dinner and dance given by her older sisters in November, 1930. She followed her older sister, Ann, to Bryn Mawr College. She graduated in 1934 with a degree in geology, with distinction. During her senior year she received the Elizabeth S. Shippen Prize in Science. In 1934 and 1935 she returned to Brearley to teach science. In 1984, at her fiftieth reunion, she was chosen by her Bryn Mawr classmates to present the class gift to the college.

On May 2, 1936, in the garden of the estate at Morristown, she married Chandler Robbins II of Boston, the son of physician Dr. William Bradford Robbins and his wife Marian Bennett Robbins. Chandler Robbins II was born in Boston on November 21, 1906, and died in Boston on June 2, 1955, of cancer. His entire career, except for the World War II years, was spent with the Bates Manufacturing Company of Lewiston, Maine, one of the greatest textile companies in America.

The young couple moved to Auburn, Maine, where the first three of five children were born: Hanson Corning, born in 1937; Theodore Bennett, born in 1939; and Marian, born in 1941 and died in 1975. Two other daughters, Sarah, born in 1943, and Jane, born in 1945, were born in Washington, D.C., while their father served in the production section of the research and development division of the Office of the Quartermaster General. At the time of Chandler Robbins's death, he was described as “assistant to the president in charge of research and development” for the Bates Manufacturing Company.

== Years at Eastern Point, Gloucester, Massachusetts ==
After renting summer houses on Gloucester for many years, Sarah Fraser's maternal aunt Myra Tutt purchased a house on Aileen Terrace, Eastern Point in 1928. At her death in 1946, Miss Tutt bequeathed the house on the harbor to her niece. For almost ten years, until Chandler Robbins's death, the family spent summers in Gloucester and the school year in Auburn. Immediately after her husband's death, Mrs. Robbins moved into the Eastern Point house and lived there all year round until her death in 2002.

Sarah's greatest friend and traveling companion was Dorothy Addams Brown, a summer and later full-time resident of Eastern Point. Dotty was born in Boston in 1923 and died in Gloucester in 2014. Addams Brown was the first woman vice president of the Boston Safe Deposit and Trust Company.

== Years with the Peabody Museum of Salem ==
In 1956 Robbins began her volunteer work at the Peabody Museum of Salem, now the Peabody Essex Museum. This was the beginning of twenty-five years of work at the Museum. In 1958, she first appears in the annual report of the director of the Peabody Museum, Ernest Dodge. In that year she was a volunteer working under Dorothy Snyder on the renovation of the "Mammals of Essex County" exhibit. In 1961, she was made Honorary Curator of Natural History. In 1971, she was made the first Director of Education of the Museum. The position was made possible by an anonymous donation. In 1981, she is listed as Director Emerita. She was then 70 years old.

While working at the museum in 1971, she gave an introduction to Physical Geology, a 6-session presentation on the “Living Landscape of Essex County,” and a 2-session in-service teacher training at the Massachusetts Audubon center in Gloucester on the physical geology of Essex County, Massachusetts, including the sea shore.

In 1972, she gave a 12-session lecture course, "How to Look at the Landscape", and two 6-session courses on "At the Edge of the Tide" and "Living Landscapes of Essex County", as well as lectures on whaling and Alaska.

In 1973, she and Clarice Yentsch co-authored The Sea is All About Us, a guidebook to the marine environments of Cape Ann and other northern New England waters.

In 1974, she ran a 5-week marine science program for almost one hundred children of Gloucester and neighboring Rockport, Massachusetts, overseeing a staff of eight teachers.

In 1975, she presided over a symposium at Harvard University of the National Association of Underwater Instructors. She also led geology field trips by bus and whale watches by boat. She re-ran the previous year's program for Gloucester school children.

In 1976, she spent some time in New Guinea; she became editor of Aquasphere, the magazine of the New England Aquarium; and she gave a 4-session course in Oceanography for the United States Power Squadrons.

In 1977, she was involved in planning a course on the environment with the extension service of the University of Massachusetts, and also started planning a “Discovery Room” for the Peabody Museum.

In 1978 and 1979, she was the naturalist aboard the schooner Harvey Gamage on week-long cruises among the Virgin Islands. She also ran seminars for elementary school teachers at Salem State College. After 1978, the museum director ceased detailing her activities.

Robbins retired in July 1981. During all her years at the Peabody Museum (which became the Peabody Essex Museum in 1992), she provided for the professional development of teachers to take leadership roles. By the end of her tenure, the museum's Education Department was providing programs for over thirty thousand children and nine thousand adults annually.

In 2003, in her memory, the Peabody Essex Museum established the Sarah Fraser Robbins Directorship of the new Art & Nature Center. This center features original exhibits that investigate the interconnection between people and nature through contemporary art, historical objects and interactive experiences.

== Contributions to the improvement of the environment of Gloucester ==
In 1961, Robbins, with other Eastern Point residents, prevailed upon members of the Raymond family to give what ultimately became almost forty acres of land on Eastern Point to the Massachusetts Audubon Society.

In 1978, Robbins, her daughter Sarah, and Philip Weld, Jr. swam almost a mile and a half in the open water of Gloucester Harbor to protest the ongoing pollution of the harbor waters. Every year since then, open water swimmers have commemorated that swim; 2014 is the 36th annual swim. The current course is about 1.2 miles out and back in the harbor. Until 1993, the swim was sponsored by the Massachusetts Audubon Society. In that year its name was changed to “Celebrate the Clean Harbor,” since the conditions had immensely improved. The Weld family sponsored a harbor cleanup research and monitoring program under the auspices of the Massachusetts Society to ensure that the federal funding necessary that the program was spent wisely. Currently, the race is sponsored by the New England Marathon Swimming Association. Robbins swam it for many years, and her daughter Sarah has succeeded her.

In 1970, the University of Massachusetts Amherst bought the defunct Consolidated Lobster Company buildings at Hodgkins Cove on the northwest side of Cape Ann to set up a marine research station to study the “basic productivity of marine water.” That same year, Charles Yentsch arrived to serve as the director, and brought his wife Clarice. Clarice Yentsch, familiar only with the ecosystems of southern waters, sought out Robbins to teach her about northern New England waters. In late June, 1974, the Yentschs resigned, and they, with most of their team of researchers and the research vessel R.V. Bigelow, moved to Boothbay, Maine, where they established the Bigelow Laboratory for Ocean Sciences.

Maritime Gloucester, formerly the Gloucester Maritime Heritage Center, is located on the Gloucester waterfront. The education center at Maritime Gloucester, formally the Sarah Fraser Robbins Marine Science Center, was dedicated November 15, 2008. On June 21, 2014, Maritime Gloucester presented the first Sarah Fraser Robbins Environmental Award to Dr. Molly Lutcavage, director of research at the University of Massachusetts Large Pelagics Research Center–in absentia, because she was in Hawaii establishing a cooperative satellite tuna tagging project. This was also the occasion of the formal launch of a re-edition of the book The Sea is All About Us, which Robbins and Clarice Yentsch had co-authored in 1973.

== Publications ==
Robbins had a regular column, “The Curious Naturalist,” which appeared in the magazines of the Massachusetts Audubon Society. She contributed articles between 1958 and 1971, almost all on the creatures of the littoral zone of Gloucester.

In 1973, she was the senior author of a book, co-authored by Clarice Yentsch, entitled The Sea is All About Us, which was based on fifty of the articles that Sarah had contributed to the Audubon Society's magazine with added material. It was jointly published by the Peabody Museum and the Cape Ann Society for Marine Science.

She also published articles on the seashore in Aquasphere, the journal of the New England Aquarium, and many small, regional journals concerned with the environment.

== Legacy ==
The guidebook and the two education centers are concrete reminders of Robbins's legacy as a provider of programs which brought natural history to thousands of people. She was an early example of a “citizen scientist.” The Sarah Fraser Robbins Environmental Award, first given by Maritime Gloucester in 2014, is established in her name to commemorate this legacy.
