= Edward Moran (disambiguation) =

Edward Moran (1829–1901) was an American artist.

Edward Moran or Ed Moran may also refer to:

- Edward C. Moran Jr. (1894–1967), American politician from Maine
- Edward Percy Moran (1862–1935), American artist, son of Edward Moran
- Edward S. Moran Jr. (1900–1996), New York politician
- Edward J. Moran, a 2006 tugboat in the port of East Boothbay, Maine
- Ed Moran (born 1981), long-distance track and roadrunner
- Ed Moran (runner, born 1937), American middle-distance runner, 1958 and 1959 All-American for the Penn State Nittany Lions track and field team

== See also ==
- Eddie Moran (disambiguation)
