= Clarice Yentsch =

American marine scientist and curator

Clarice Morel Yentsch is a scientist, author, education and museum professional, and community benefactor. As a scientist, she pioneered the use of flow cytometry to investigate marine phytoplankton and co-founded Bigelow Laboratory for Ocean Sciences.

== Education and career ==
Yentsch has a B.S. Natural Sciences (1964) and M.Sc. Science Education Biology (1965) from the University of Wisconsin. In the period between 1967 and 1968, she also taught biology at the Junior College of Broward County which is now called Broward College. She obtained her Ph.D. from Nova Southeastern University where she was one of 21 students in Nova Southeastern's first class four of whom were women. Yentsch describes the beginning of Nova Southeastern's oceanography program and their one-to-one ratio of Ph.D. students to professors in a 2014 video filmed during a celebration of the founding of Bigelow Laboratory for Ocean Sciences. The program from the May 17, 1970 commencement lists her Ph.D. research project as a "Contribution by Oscillatoria erythraea (Ehrenb.) Kutz, to the Primary Productivity of the Tropical Marine Environment", by Clarice Morel and advised by Charles S. Yentsch.

Clarice and her husband Charles Yentsch considered positions at the University of Massachusetts in 1970, but the offers were rescinded because the University of Massachusetts would not allow Clarice to hold a position at the same institution as her husband. When land became available on McKown Point in Maine, Charlie and Clarice worked to establish a research institution there which, in literature dating to 1954, is described as the Northeastern Research Foundation and later became the Bigelow Laboratory for Ocean Sciences. During a 2014 event at Bigelow Laboratory, Clarice noted "people are first" was a guiding principle of the foundation of the laboratory and she and Charlie aimed to establish a research institute that would minimize the bureaucratic load on the scientists. Yentsch has described one goal of founding Bigelow Laboratory to allow scientists to "focus on the sea as a unit". In 2019 Deborah Bronk, the director of Bigelow Laboratory for Ocean Sciences, described the lab as “brain child of two rebel oceanographers [Clarice and Charlie Yentsch] who were sick of people telling them what to do".

From 1974 to 1993, Yentsch was a Research Scientist at Bigelow. After that period, she worked at a number of public institutions including the Education Development Center in Newton, MA (1993–1998), the American Museum of Natural History in New York City (1998–2001), the Mel Fisher Maritime Museum (2002–2008), the Smithsonian Institution National Museum of Natural History in Washington D.C. and Nova Southeastern University Oceanographic Center in Dania Beach, Florida (starting in 2009).

== Research ==
Yentsch is known for adapting the use of flow cytometry from biomedical research to the study of phytoplankton in marine systems. In 1981, Yentsch first demonstrated this by utilizing a flow cytometer from the medical laboratories of the University of Rochester to quantify the amount of saxitoxin in the red tide dinoflagellate Gonyaulax. In 1982, Yentsch lead a team of scientists in the flow cytometric analysis of seawater samples collected at the Bermuda Biological Station (now the Bermuda Atlantic Time-series Study) where they demonstrated phytoplankton cells could be distinguished from non-living material and that cyanobacteria could be sorted from a mixed community and subsequently cultured in the lab. To develop this technology, Clarice Yentsch received funding in 1982 from the National Science Foundation (OCE 8213567 for "Flow cytometry development for ocean science research" and OCE-8121331 "Carbon in autotrophs and heterotrophs separated by fluorescence-activated cell sorting"). In 1983, Clarice Yentsch established the Center for Aquatic Cytometry at Bigelow Laboratory for Ocean Sciences which is active to this day. In 1988, Sallie W. Chisholm, Robert Olsen, and Clarice Yentsch described flow cytometry with the goal of introducing the technique to the oceanographic community, including a list of flow cytometers dedicated to oceanography and limnology.

By 1984, the study of phytoplankton was advancing due to the ability of flow cytometry to characterize phytoplankton on small scales, as described in a paper led by Clarice Yentsch. By adding stains that bind to DNA, Yentsch and colleagues were able to quantify the nucleic acid content of dinoflagellates and thereby estimate the actively-growing proportion of the microbial population. The use of flow cytometry in aquatic science advanced rapidly and in 1989 Clarice Yentsch and Paul Horan co-edited a special issue on "Cytometry in the Aquatic Sciences".

At the same time, large scale investigations into phytoplankton ecology using satellites were beginning and Clarice and Charles Yentsch examined both of these tools in a 1984 publication. Clarice and Charlie had history of joint publications starting with two publications in 1970 on the quantification of phytoplankton pigments in oligotrophic oceans and the decomposition of chlorophyll from marine phytoplankton. This early research was funded by a $31,900 grant from the National Institutes of Health to Clarice Yentsch at the Northeastern Research Foundation, the precursor to Bigelow Laboratory for Ocean Sciences, for a project entitled "Assessment of health hazards from toxic red tide cysts".

== Philanthropic activities ==
Yentsch works in the community in several roles. She worked on the Teachers Experience Antarctica project and serves on the advisory committee for the Consortium for Ocean Science Exploration and Engagement (COSEE). In 2015, Yentsch established the Waypoint Foundation to address areas of concern in the Florida Keys. Through the Waypoint Foundation, Yentsch is working on two initiatives, the Innocent Souls show of Vietnam photography and a program on dental health through the Smile Maker project.

== Published books ==
Yentsch has published two books: The Women Scientist: Meeting the Challenges for a Successful Career and, with Sarah Fraser Robbins, The Sea is All About Us.

== Awards and honors ==
- Maryann Hartman Award from University of Maine for achievement by a Maine woman (1996)
- Distinguished Alumni Achievement Award from Nova Southeastern University (2005)
- Association for the Sciences of Limnology and Oceanography honor Clarice Yentsch and David Schindler by establishing the Yentsch-Schindler Award for early career scientists (2012)
- NIGHTSEA / Electron Microscopy Sciences KEY award was named for K = Les Kaufman, E = Harold Edgerton and Thomas Eisner, and Y is the "remarkable husband and wife team of Drs. Charlie and Clarice Yentsch" (2015)
