= Allen's Island =

Allan's Island or Allen's Island may refer to:

- Allan's Island, Newfoundland and Labrador in Canada
- Allen's Island (St. George, Maine) in Maine, USA, listed on the NRHP
