= Damariscove Island =

Island in Maine

- Location within Maine Location within the United States

Geography
- Coordinates: 43°45′36″N 69°36′51″W

Damariscove is an uninhabited island at the southernmost part of a chain of islands extending south from the Maine coast, defining the eastern side of Boothbay, Maine. It is approximately 5 nautical miles (9.3 km) off the coast at the mouth of the Damariscotta River. The long, narrow island is approximately 2 miles (3.2 km) long and 1,500 feet (460 m) at its widest point. It has served as a fishing settlement and a United States Coast Guard life saving station. In December 2009, Governor John Baldacci named Damariscove, together with Monhegan and Boon islands, as test sites for a three year trial run testin the viability of offshore wind farms. Critics have called for careful oversight to ensure that local lobster fisheries and migratory bird paths are not affected.

== History ==
The earliest residents of the island were the Abenaki, who called the island Aquahega or "place of landing." (Note: Woodard 2004, p.84) As early as 1604, the island was settled as a commercial fishing enterprise, with Francis Popham among those sending fishing vessels there on yearly expeditions. (Note: Duncan 1992, p.48) Captain John Smith charted the island as "Damerils Iles" after a visit in 1614, with the name traditionally attributed to Humphrey Damerill. (Note: Griffin 1981, p.17) Damerill had been a member of the failed Popham Colony, but moved to Damariscove in 1608 to establish a store to supply the fishing community. (Note: Duncan 1992, p.111) By 1622, the island was home to 13 year-round fishermen, with two shallops in the winter and up to 30 sailing ships fishing the waters in the spring. The fishermen had also constructed a fort, with a palisade and mounted gun. (Note: Duncan 1992, p.111) When the Pilgrims of Plymouth Colony were facing starvation in the spring of 1622, they sent a boat to Damariscove to beg for assistance. The fishermen responded by filling the colonists’ boat with cod, which helped ensure the Pilgrims’ survival. (Note: Duncan 1992, p.111) Damariscove had become a thriving community when, in 1671, Massachusetts Bay Colony laid claim to the island, extending their eastern borders. Over the next few years, the Massachusetts General Court established a local government there, and appointed a military officer and constable. The court also granted a license for a house of entertainment, while assessing taxes for the first time. (Note: Griffin 1981, p.20)

On August 20, 1676, in the aftermath of King Philip's War, a massive Native American assault attacked and burned every settlement east of the Kennebec River, including the nearby settlement of Pemaquid. (Note: Woodard 2004, p.109) Approximately 300 Refugees from Pemaquid, Boothbay, Damariscotta and Sheepscot converged on the island, seeking shelter. Despite the presence at the time of farms, a fort and a tavern, there were not enough provisions to support this many refugees. When nearby Fisherman's Island was attacked a few days later, everyone crowded into boats and fled to the better protected Monhegan Island to the east. (Note: Woodard 2004, p.110) The residents did not abandon the island for long, as records indicate that a sloop was seized and a man killed in another raid later that year. (Note: Duncan 1992, p.128)

Damariscove was also the target of attacks at the start of King William's War in 1689. Richard Pattishall, who had bought the island in 1685, was slain in the first attack. In another raid that summer, thirteen Abenaki were driven back, and no casualties were reported. (Note: Duncan 1992, pp.133-134) Despite additional attacks in 1697 and during Father Rale's War in 1725, Damariscove Island continued to survive as a fishing station. (Note: Griffin 1981, p.21) In 1717, Damariscove was the destination of the pirate Samuel Bellamy after taking 53 ships and over sixty cannon; but on April 26 of 1717 his ship, Whydah Galley, wrecked on the backside of Cape Cod before he could reach the island. According to historian and pirateologist Kenneth J. Kinkor and the Boston trial records of the Whydah's survivors, it was the intent of Bellamy to establish a pirate republic on Damariscove and join forces with the Pirate Republic of the Bahamas, thus completely blockading the entire Eastern seaboard and wrestling control of North America from England and the rest of Europe.

By the time of the American Revolution, farming had begun to play a significant role on the island. Just prior to the Burning of Falmouth in 1775, Captain Henry Mowatt raided the island, burning at least one home to the ground. Historical records show that Mowatt's forces carried off seventy-eight sheep and three hogs. (Note: Griffin 1981, pp.23-24)

By the late 19th century, most farming and fishing had moved elsewhere, while many of the surrounding areas, such as Squirrel Island, Southport and Boothbay Harbor were developing into resort communities. The remaining inhabitants of Damariscove Island primarily made a living from dairy farming, with some additional income from fishing and running an ice house with ice harvested from the fresh water pond on the island. The produce was delivered by boat to local hotels and summer communities. (Note: Griffin 1981, p.27) As recently as 1914, there was a large enough population on the island to establish a school, (Note: Griffin 1981, p.85) but by 1917, enough families had moved off the island for the school to close. (Note: Griffin 1981, p.43)

A majority of the island has been protected since Mr. and Mrs. K.L. Parker donated it to The Nature Conservancy in 1966. Prior to the summer of 2005, The Nature Conservancy transferred ownership of the island to the Boothbay Region Land Trust (BRLT), while maintaining a "forever wild" conservation easement.

== U.S. Coast Guard station ==
- Damariscove Lifesaving Station
- U.S. National Register of Historic Places
- Location within Maine Location within the United States
- Nearest city: Boothbay, Maine
- Coordinates: 43°45′18″N 69°36′57″W
- Area: less than one acre
- Built: 1897
- Architect: Mendelheff, Victor
- NRHP reference No.: 87000924
- Added to NRHP: June 25, 1987

The Damariscove Lifesaving Station is a historic coastal maritime rescue facility facing the western leg of the channel. It was built in 1897 in response to the frequent shipwrecks on the ledges and shoals that surround the island.

The United States Life-Saving Service was established in 1874 by the United States government to provide marine rescue services along the nation's shores and waterways. Between then and 1929, the Service, and its successor the United States Coast Guard, built twelve stations on the Maine coast. The one on Damariscove Island was designed by Victor Mendelheff, and is one of the more architecturally distinguished of the surviving stations. It has an asymmetrically massed 1-1/2 story wood frame structure, sections covered by hip roofs, and an octagonal observation tower at the southeast corner. The boathouse portion extends east from the main block, with north-facing bay doors. The station was staffed by the United States Life-Saving Service and later the Coast Guard, until 1959, and was listed on the National Register of Historic Places on June 25, 1987. It is now privately owned.

While the life station and surrounding area remains under private ownership, the remainder of the island is now uninhabited. Damariscove harbor is still actively used for moorings and storage docks by the local commercial fishing fleet. BRLT maintains two guest moorings, the stone pier, and several hiking trails that are open to the public during the summer. The northern half of the island is a protected nesting site each spring for the common eider.

== See also ==
- List of islands of Maine
- National Register of Historic Places listings in Lincoln County, Maine
