= Fisherman Island (Maine) =

Island in Lincoln County, Maine, United States

- Location within Maine

Geography
- Location: Gulf of Maine
- Coordinates: 43°47′50″N 69°35′58″W
- Area: 70.7 acres (28.6 ha)

Administration
- United States of America
- State: Maine
- County: Lincoln County
- Town: Boothbay

Fisherman Island, or Fisherman's Island, is a 71-acre (29 ha) island, on the central coast of Maine, United States. Located roughly midway between Damariscove Island and the mainland at Ocean Point, the privately owned island has a history of human activity predating the colonial period, and was settled by English fishermen in the 17th century. The island was listed on the National Register of Historic Places in 2015 for the significance of its prehistoric archaeological sites.

== Description ==
Fisherman Island is part of a group of islands along the eastern edge of Boothbay, extending roughly southward from Ocean Point, the southernmost mainland point of the town of Boothbay, at the tip of the Linekin Neck peninsula. The island is relatively narrow and about 1 mile (1.6 km) long, with a narrow section at its center. It is separated by a narrow channel from Ram Island, where the Ram Island Light is located. To its east are a series of ledges known as The Hypocrites, a name probably derived from early references to this island as "Hippocras".

At the center of the northern half of the island stand a small cluster of buildings, which were used for some years in the 20th century as a religious retreat, but were then updated for potential use as an inn or family retreat. The island is otherwise treeless and windswept, and is a significant waterfowl nesting area.

== History ==
The island has evidence of prehistoric human habitation, for which it was listed on the National Register of Historic Places in 2015. The island is believed to have been a landing point of the exploratory expedition of Englishman George Weymouth in 1605. Damariscove Island soon afterward was settled as a significant coastal fishing community, and by the 1640s two families were said to be living on Fisherman's, along with fifteen on Damariscove. Fisherman's was attacked by Native Americans in 1676, late in King Philip's War, as part of broadbased campaign against all English settlements east of the Kennebec River, and was abandoned until 1684. It was again abandoned with the outbreak of King William's War in 1689.

In 1925, the island was purchased by John Henry Wilson, a minister who established a religious retreat, building the large stone house that now occupies the island's high point. It has since been redeveloped.

== See also ==
- List of islands of Maine
- National Register of Historic Places listings in Lincoln County, Maine

== Sources ==
- Greene, Francis (1906). History of Boothbay, Southport and Boothbay Harbor, Maine. 1623-1905. Boothbay, Maine: Loring.
