= Chebeague Island Ferry =

Passenger ferry in Maine, United States

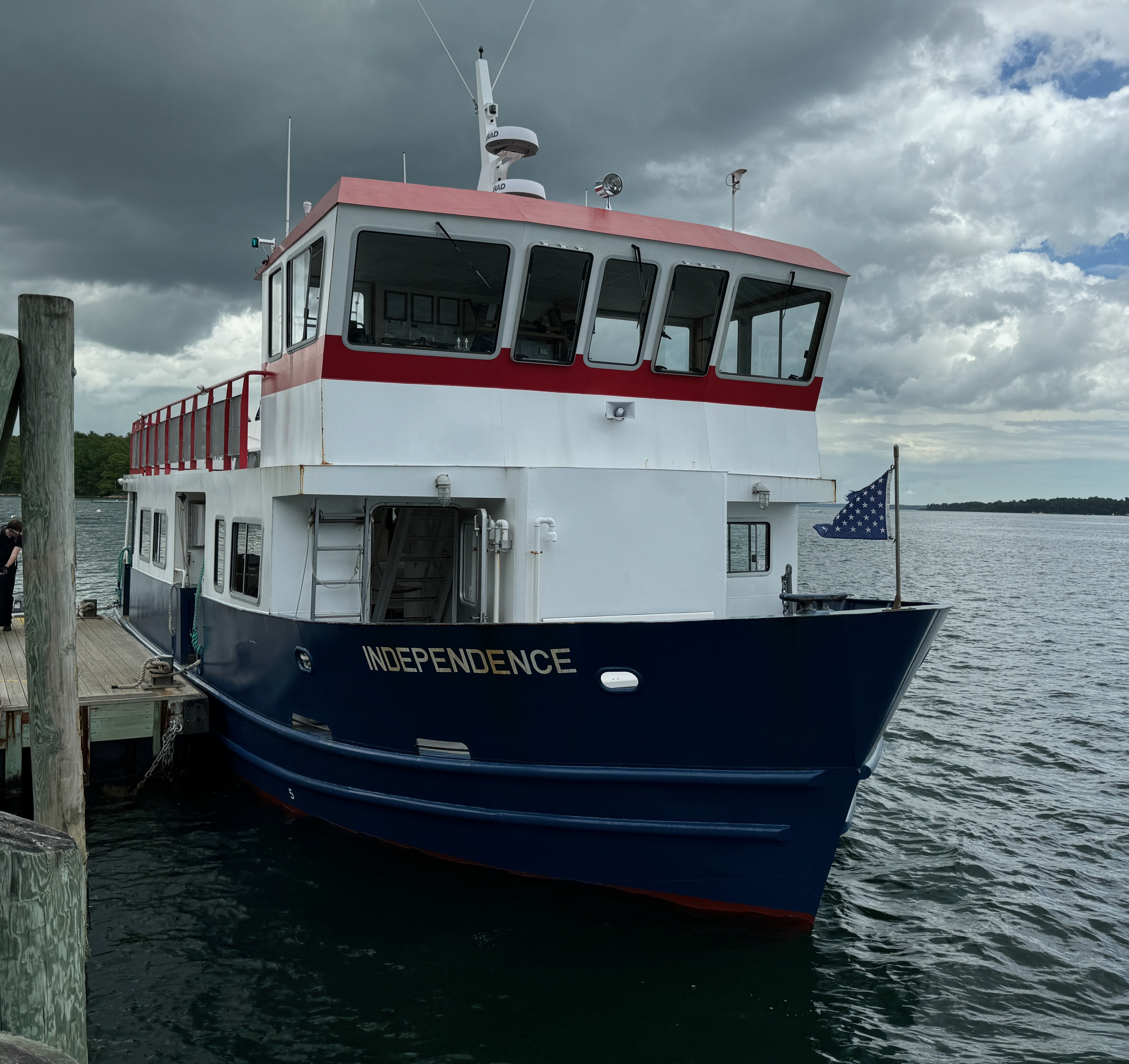
- Independence at the Cousins Island wharf (2024)

History

United States
- Name: Chebeague Island Ferry
- Owner: Chebeague Transportation Company
- Operator: Chebeague Transportation Company
- Route: Chebeague Island to Cousins Island, Maine
- Builder: Washburn & Doughty Associates, East Boothbay, Maine
- Launched: July 19, 2019 (6 years ago)
- Maiden voyage: 1975 (50 years ago)
- Status: Operational

General characteristics
- Type: Ferry

The Chebeague Island Ferry (also known as the CTC Ferry) is a passenger ferry which runs between Chebeague Island and Cousins Island in Maine, United States. Operated by the Chebeague Transportation Company (CTC), the route was formally established in 1975, although boats have carried passengers between the two islands since the late 1950s. Around 120,000 passengers make the crossing on the ferry each year.

The first ferry, a wooden vessel named the Polly-Lin II, was able to carry 23 passengers. It was replaced two years later by the larger Big Squaw. The Islander was purpose-built, and was launched in 1985. It was in service for thirty years and, as of 2023, is the back-up vessel.

The 54-foot (16 m) Independence, was introduced in 2019.

A CTC-owned barge, for carrying cars, trucks and large equipment, is moored off Chebeague Island.

== Schedule ==
The ferry runs seven days a week, albeit with a curtailed schedule on Sundays, from 6:30 AM to 9:30 PM (10:30 PM on Friday and Saturday). It departs Chebeague Island's Stone Wharf for the Cousins Island Wharf. The crossing takes around fifteen minutes.

A bus is available to bring passengers from a satellite parking lot on U.S. Route 1 in Cumberland Foreside.

== Construction ==
The vessel was built by Washburn & Doughty Associates in East Boothbay, Maine.

== Gallery ==
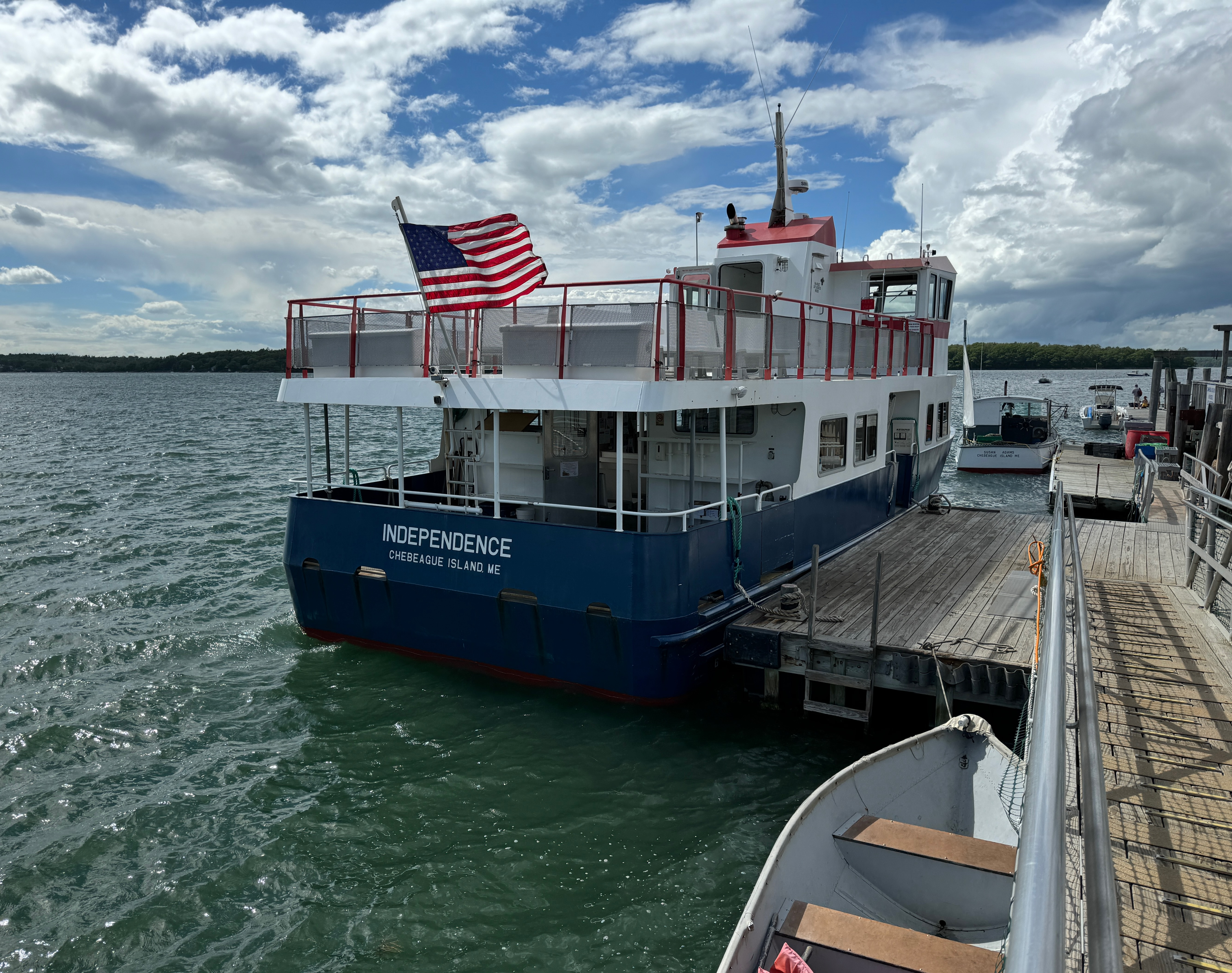
The Independence berthed at Stone Wharf on Chebeague Island in 2024

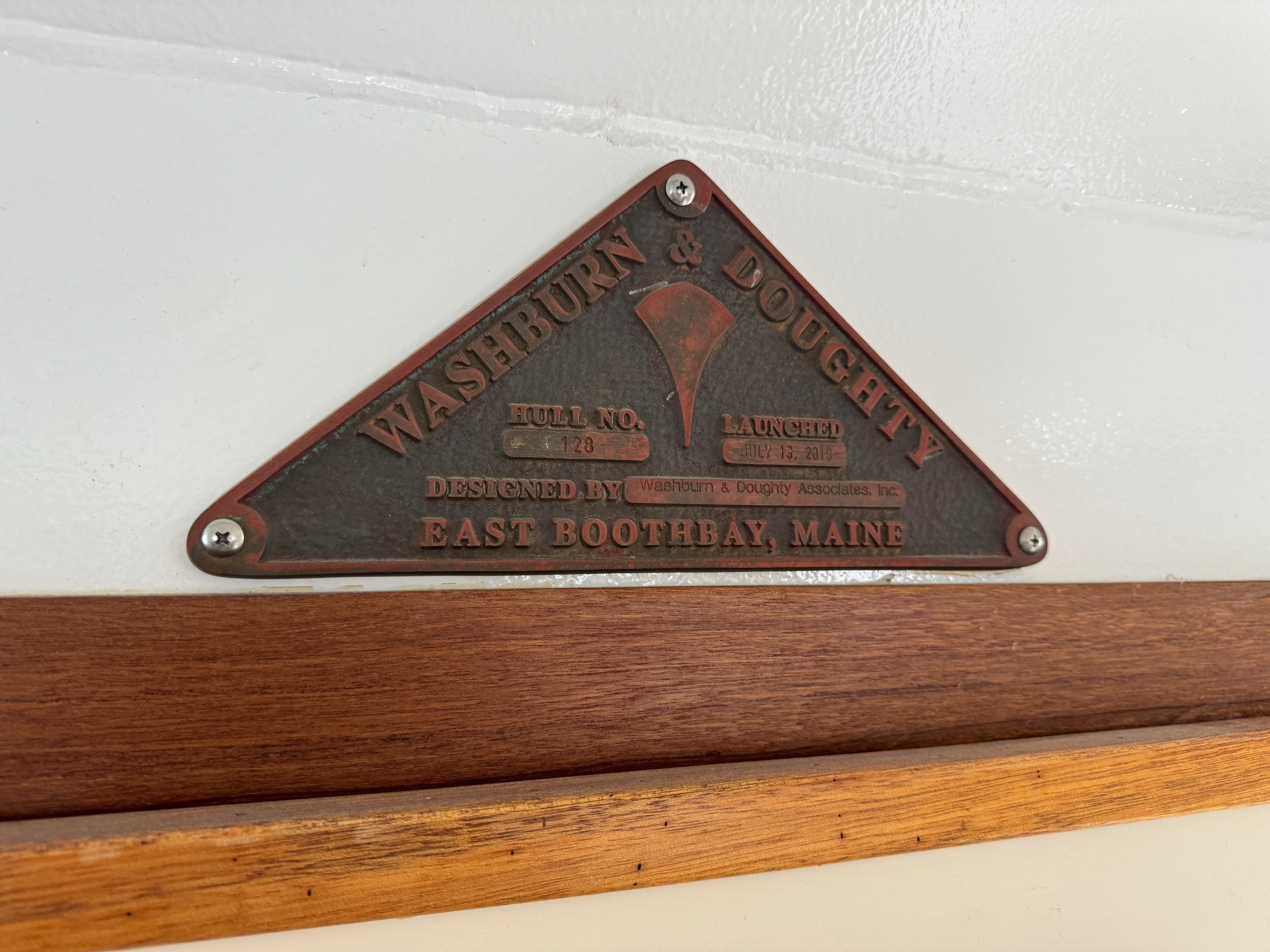
Construction plate aboard the vessel

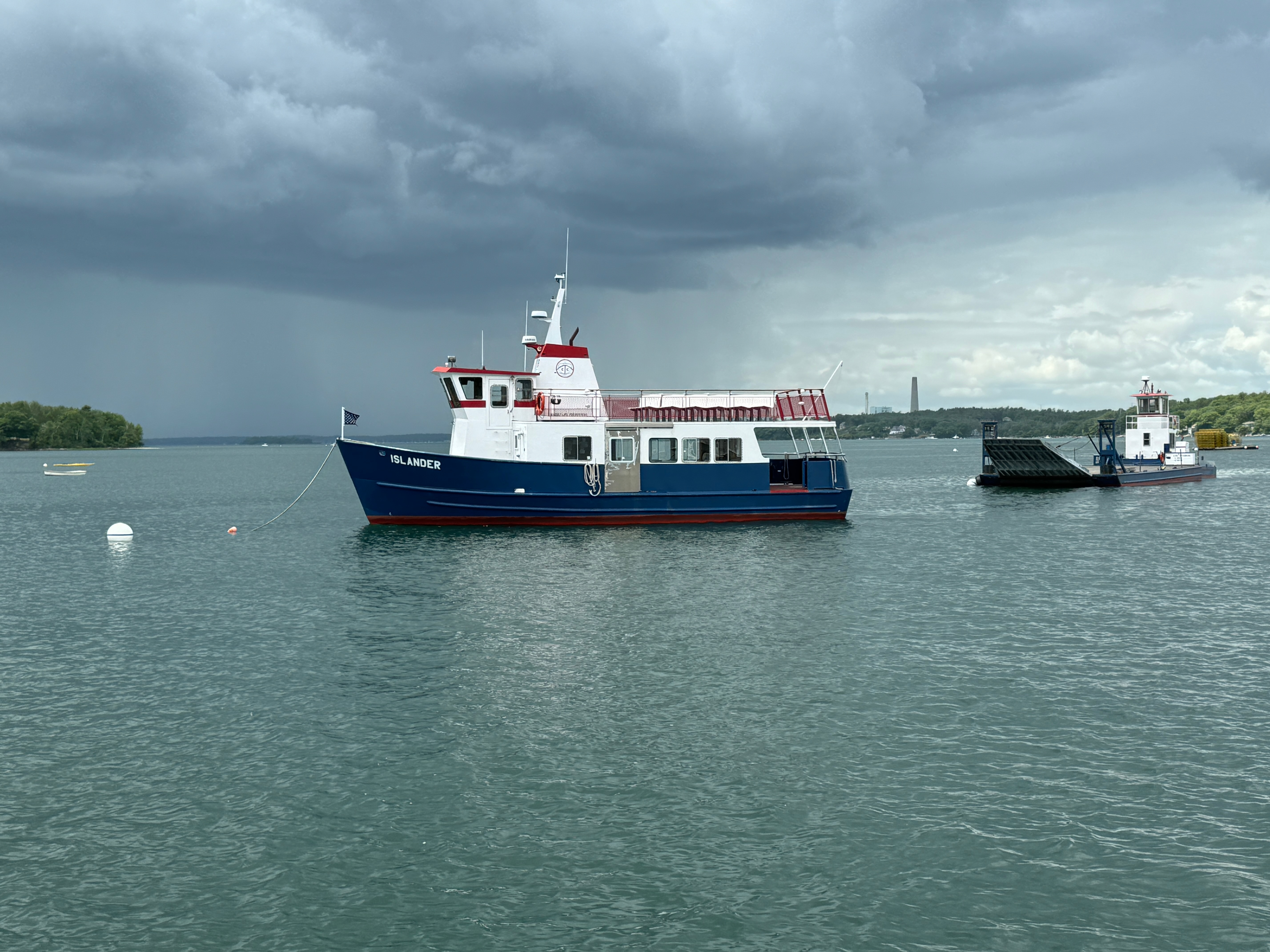
The Islander and barge moored off Chebeague Island in 2024
