= Hendricks Head Light =

Lighthouse in Maine, US

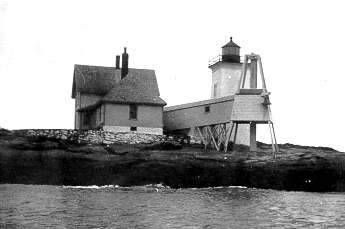
- Undated US Coast Guard photo
- Location: Sheepscot River, Maine
- Coordinates: 43°49′21.282″N 69°41′23.011″W

Tower
- Constructed: 1829
- Construction: brick
- Automated: 1975
- Height: 12 m (39 ft)
- Shape: Square Brick Tower
- Markings: White
- Heritage: National Register of Historic Places listed place
- Fog signal: Bell originally now none

Light
- First lit: 1875 (current structure)
- Deactivated: 1933-1951
- Focal height: 43 feet (13 m)
- Lens: 4th order Fresnel lens (original), 9.8 inches (250 mm) (current)
- Range: 9 nautical miles (17 km; 10 mi) & 7 nautical miles (13 km; 8.1 mi)
- Characteristic: F W with R sector
- Hendricks Head Light Station
- U.S. National Register of Historic Places
- U.S. Historic district
- Nearest city: West Southport, Maine
- Built: 1875
- Architect: US Army Corps of Engineers
- MPS: Light Stations of Maine MPS
- NRHP reference No.: 87002024
- Added to NRHP: November 20, 1987

Hendricks Head Light is a lighthouse in Southport, Maine marking the west side of the mouth of the Sheepscot River. The light station was established in 1829, and its present structures date to 1875. It was deactivated in 1933, but relit in 1951. The two-story wood keeper's house is now a private summer residence. The light is on continuously, showing white to the west and red to the east. It was listed on the National Register of Historic Places as Hendricks Head Light Station on November 20, 1987.

== Description and history ==
The town of Southport occupies an eponymous island on the Mid Coast of Maine, separating the Sheepscot River from the Boothbay Harbor. Hendricks Head is a peninsula extending southwest on the northern part of the island's western shore, and marks the westernmost point of the island. The lighthouse is located at the tip of the peninsula. The station includes a tower, keeper's house, fog bell tower, shed, and oil house. The tower is a tapered square-shingled wood-frame structure, topped by an octagonal lantern house. It was originally connected to the keeper's house via a covered walkway. The keeper's house is a T-shaped 2 1/2-story wood-frame building. The bell tower is a roughly pyramidal structure, with a central enclosed section housing the bell.

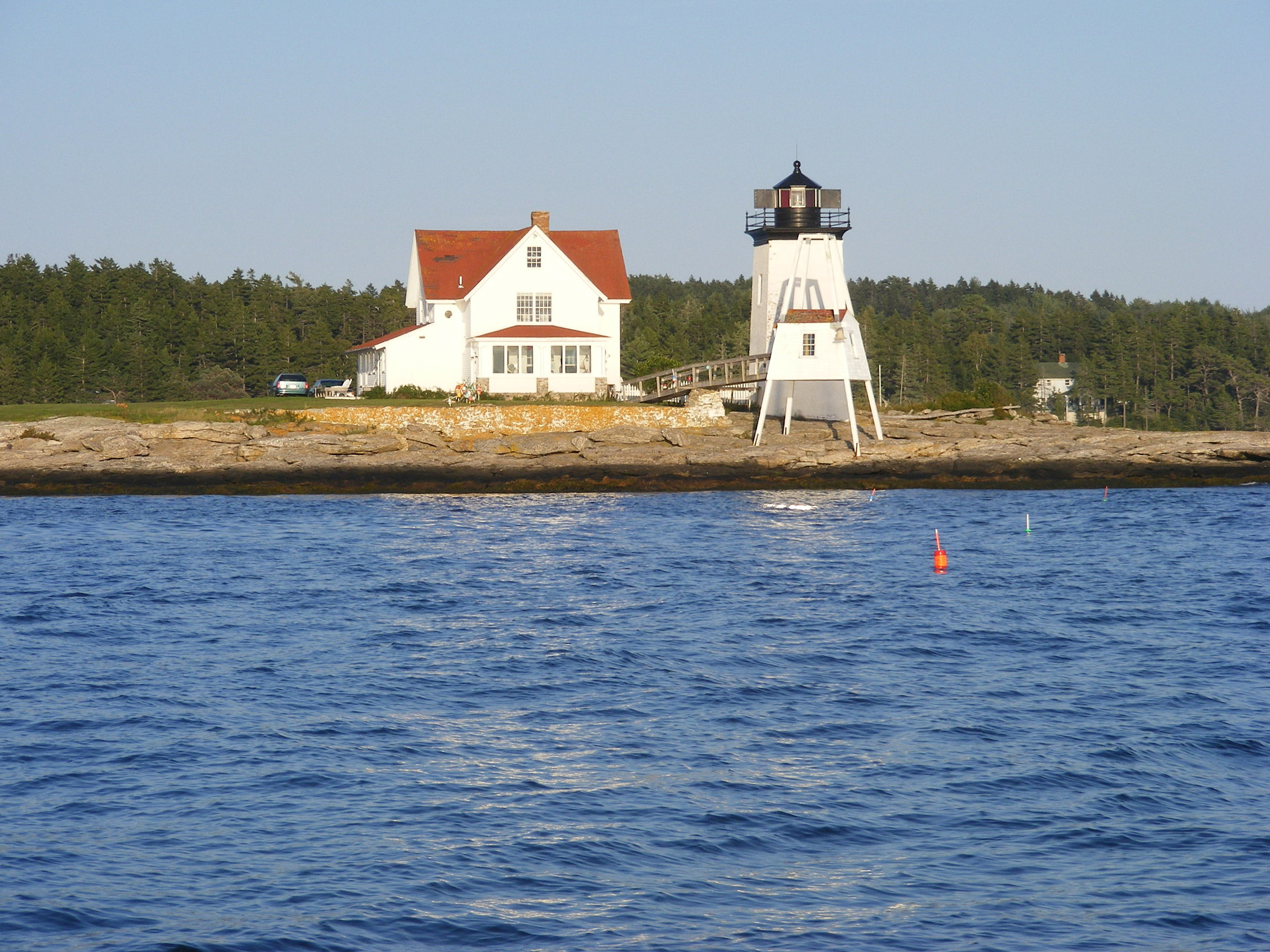
The light in 2020

The light station was established in 1829 to mark the mouth of the Sheepscot River, which provided access to the then-important shipbuilding and port center of Wiscasset. The original light station consisted of a keeper's house, built on a rubble foundation, with the lantern house mounted on top. The present tower and keeper's house were built in 1875, the house on the foundation of the previous building.

== See also ==
- National Register of Historic Places listings in Lincoln County, Maine
