= Woodbury S. Grover =

American politician

Woodbury S. Grover was a member of the Wisconsin State Assembly.

== Biography ==
Grover was born on December 3, 1830, in Townsend, Maine. On February 25, 1856, he married Angeline Potter. In 1858, Grover took his wife and their daughter, Floribella, to Dunn County, Wisconsin. There, he worked for Knapp, Stout & Co. and began farming. Grover would move to Dallas (town), Wisconsin, in 1868 and to Ridgeland, Wisconsin, in 1902.

In addition to Floribella, Grover and his wife would have twelve more children. One son, Warren, would become Postmaster of Ridgeland. Angeline died on March 20, 1918, and Woodbury died on January 28, 1927.

== Political career ==
Grover was a member of the Assembly during the 1877 session. Other positions he held include Chairman (similar to Mayor) of Dallas. He was a Republican.
