= Knight-Corey House =

Historic house in Maine, United States

- U.S. National Register of Historic Places
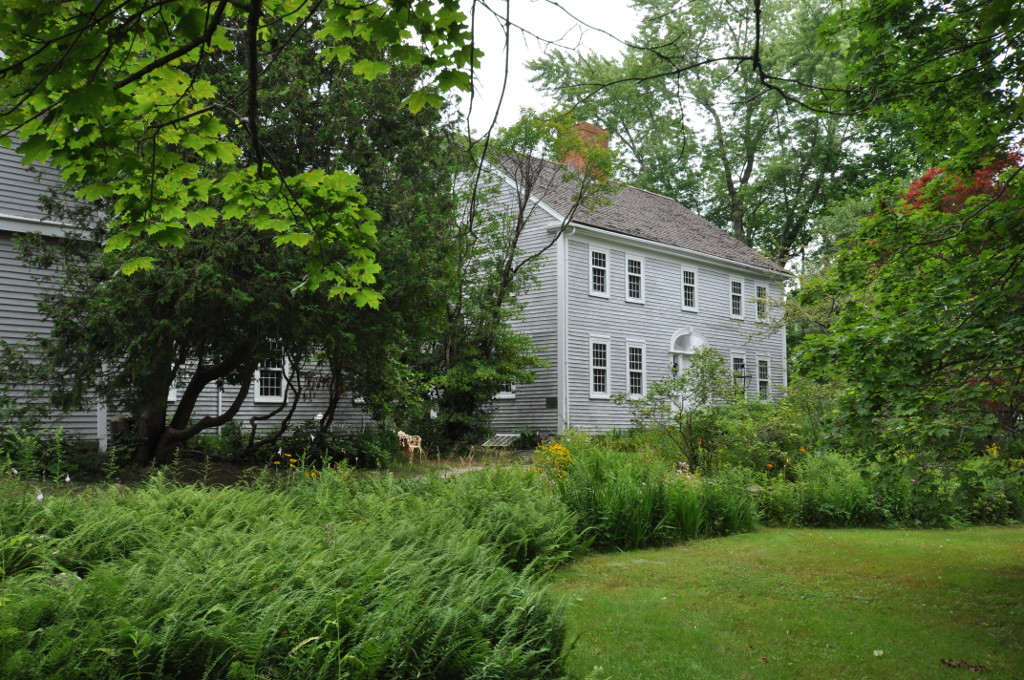

- Location within Maine Location within the United States
- Location: Corey Lane, Boothbay, Maine
- Coordinates: 43°52′35″N 69°38′9″W
- Area: 0.5 acres (0.20 ha)
- Built: 1787
- Built by: Knight, Nicholas
- Architectural style: Federal
- NRHP reference No.: 80000237
- Added to NRHP: March 13, 1980

The Knight-Corey House is a historic house on Corey Lane in Boothbay, Maine. Built in 1787, it is a high quality local example of Federal period architecture. It was listed on the National Register of Historic Places in 1980.

== Description and history ==
The Knight-Corey House stands in the village center of Boothbay, occupying a triangular lot formed on the northeast by Back River Road and on the south by Corey Lane. It is a large 2 1/2-story timber-frame structure, with a gabled roof, large central chimney, clapboard siding, and fieldstone foundation. Its main facade faces south, and is a symmetrical five bays across. The centered entrance is flanked by sidelight windows and topped by a Federal style fan. A 1 1/2-story wood-frame ell extends to the west of the main block, joining it to a barn. The interior has restored Federal period features, including five working fireplaces, gunstock posts, and a distinctive enclosed circular staircase.

The house was built in 1787 by Nicholas Knight, on a site previously occupied by an inn established by one of the area's early settlers. From 1974 to 1990 the house was home to the Boothbay Theatre Museum, an extensive collection of theatrical memorabilia collected by Franklyn Lenthall, featuring large numbers of items associated with actors Edwin Booth and Sarah Bernhardt. The museum was closed in 1990 and its collections were auctioned off.

== See also ==
- National Register of Historic Places listings in Lincoln County, Maine
