= Edward J. Moran =

History
- Operator: Moran Towing Corporation
- Launched: 2006
- In service: 2006
- Identification: IMO number: 9365336; MMSI number: 367108030; Callsign: WDC9891; USCG Doc. No.: 1181190

General characteristics
- Tonnage: 263 gross; 179 net
- Length: 93.4 ft (28.47 m)
- Beam: 37.6 ft (11.46 m)
- Depth: 16 ft (4.88 m)

Edward J. Moran is a tugboat built in 2006 by Washburn and Doughty Associates, in the port of East Boothbay, Maine. Built for the Moran Towing Corporation of New Canaan, Connecticut, the tug was profiled in Popular Mechanics as "the world's most powerful tugboat." The boat works out of Savannah, Georgia, and its tasks include escorting gas carriers transporting liquefied natural gas. Among its capacities, it has powerful twin Z-drive propellers with which it "can go from 13 knots forward to 13 knots in reverse in 15 seconds", and it has a 100-horsepower winch and two 900 horsepower water cannons for fighting fires.
