= Eddie Moran =

Eddie Moran may refer to

- Eddie Moran (politician), Mayor of Reading, Pennsylvania, see List of mayors of Reading, Pennsylvania
- Eddie Moran (writer) (1899-1987), see Eve Knew Her Apples
- Eddie Moran (footballer) (1930-2013), see List of Rochdale A.F.C. players (25–99 appearances)
- Eddie Moran (actor) (born 1966), see List of fictional doctors

== See also ==
- Edward Moran (disambiguation)
