= Southport, Maine =

Town in Maine, United States

- Town
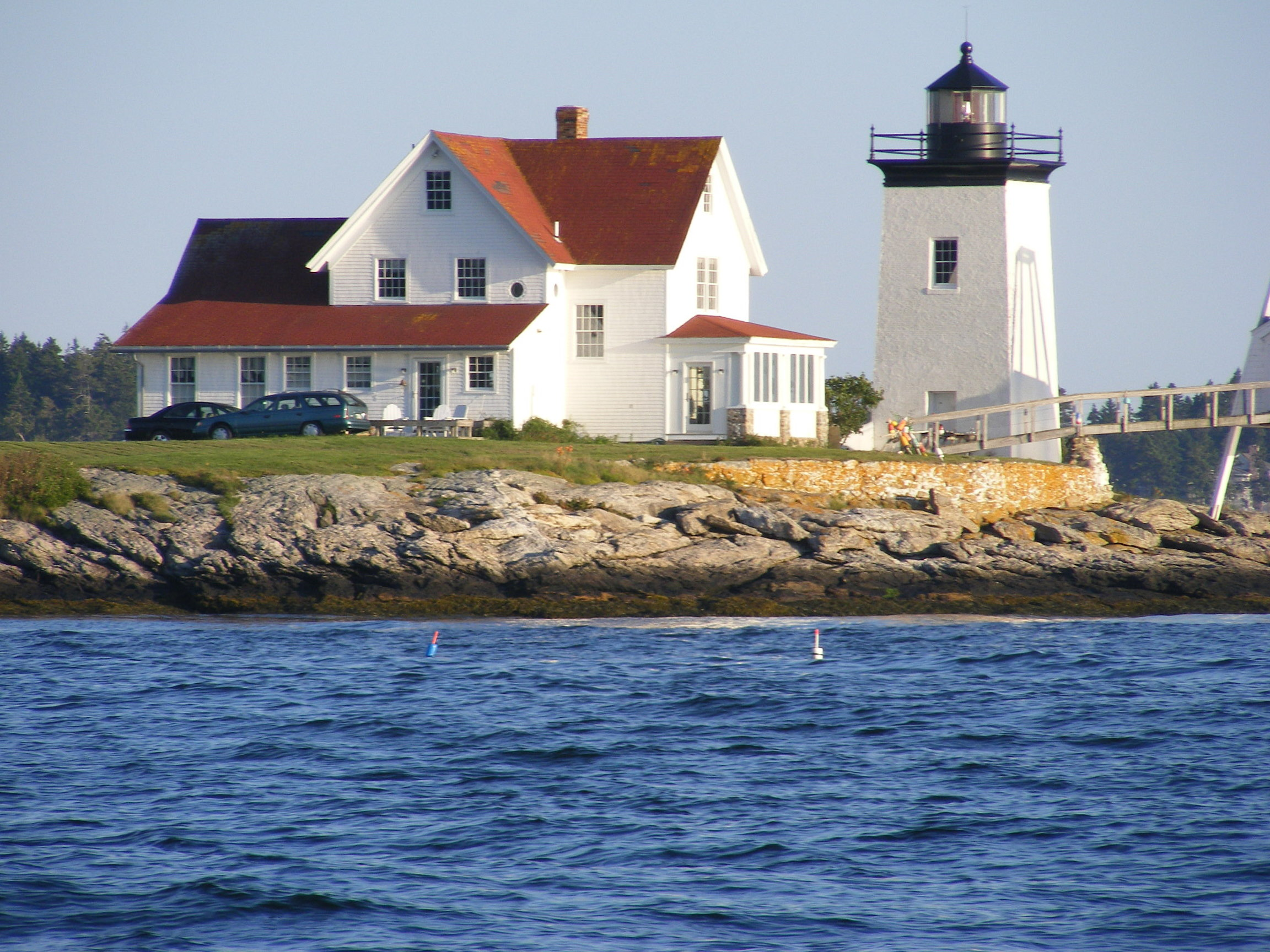
- Hendricks Head Light

- Seal

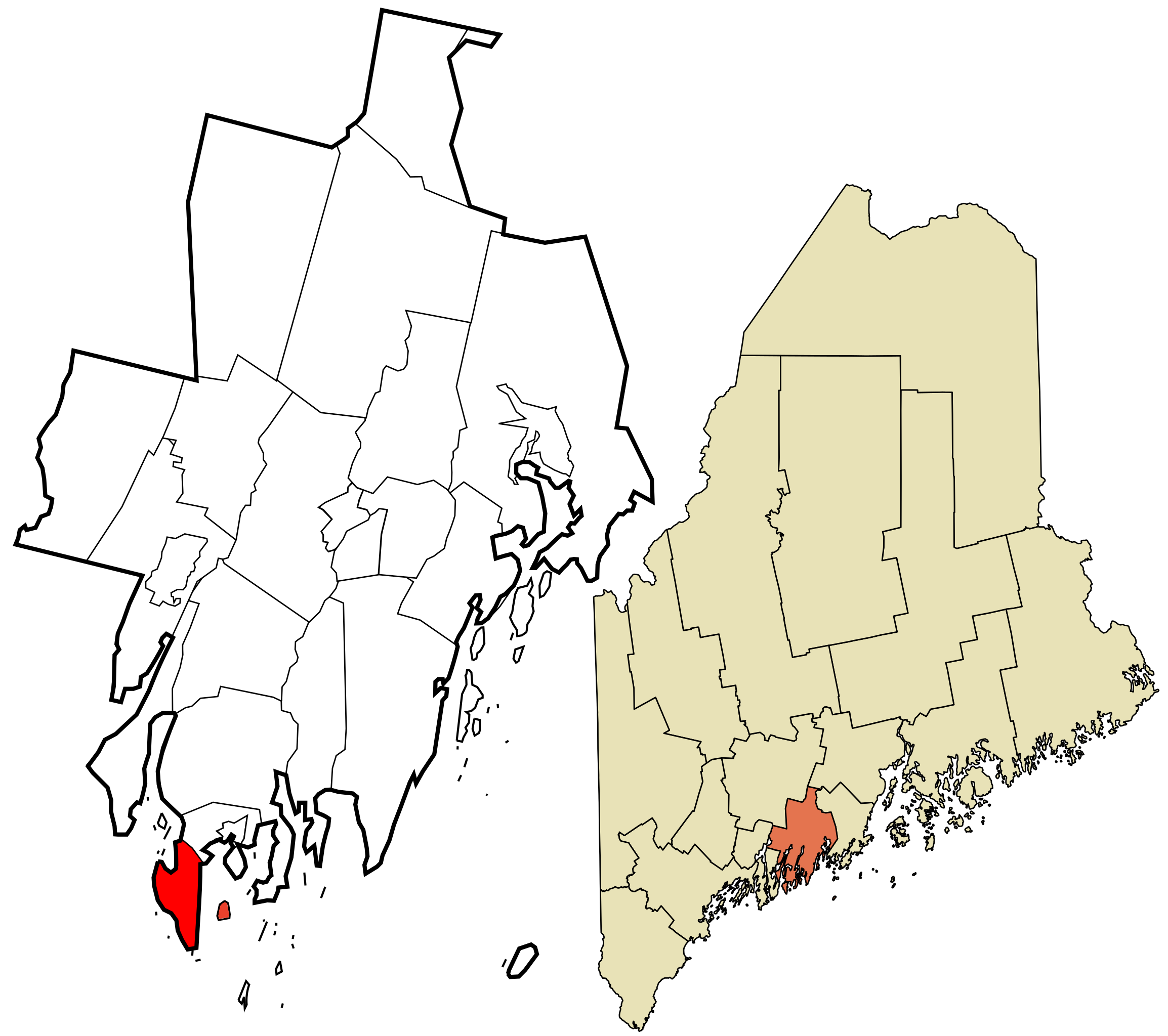
- Location in Lincoln County and the state of Maine
- Coordinates: 43°47′50″N 69°38′22″W
- Country: United States
- State: Maine
- County: Lincoln
- First settled: 1623
- Incorporated as a town: 1842

Area
  - Total: 23.16 sq mi (59.98 km^{2})
  - Land: 5.38 sq mi (13.93 km^{2})
  - Water: 17.78 sq mi (46.05 km^{2})
- Elevation: 43 ft (13 m)

Population (2020)
  - Total: 622
  - Density: 116/sq mi (44.7/km^{2})
- Time zone: UTC-5 (Eastern (EST))
  - Summer (DST): UTC-4 (EDT)
- ZIP Codes: 04576 (Southport); 04570 (Squirrel Island)
- Area code: 207
- FIPS code: 23-71955
- GNIS feature ID: 582737
- Website: www.townofsouthport.org

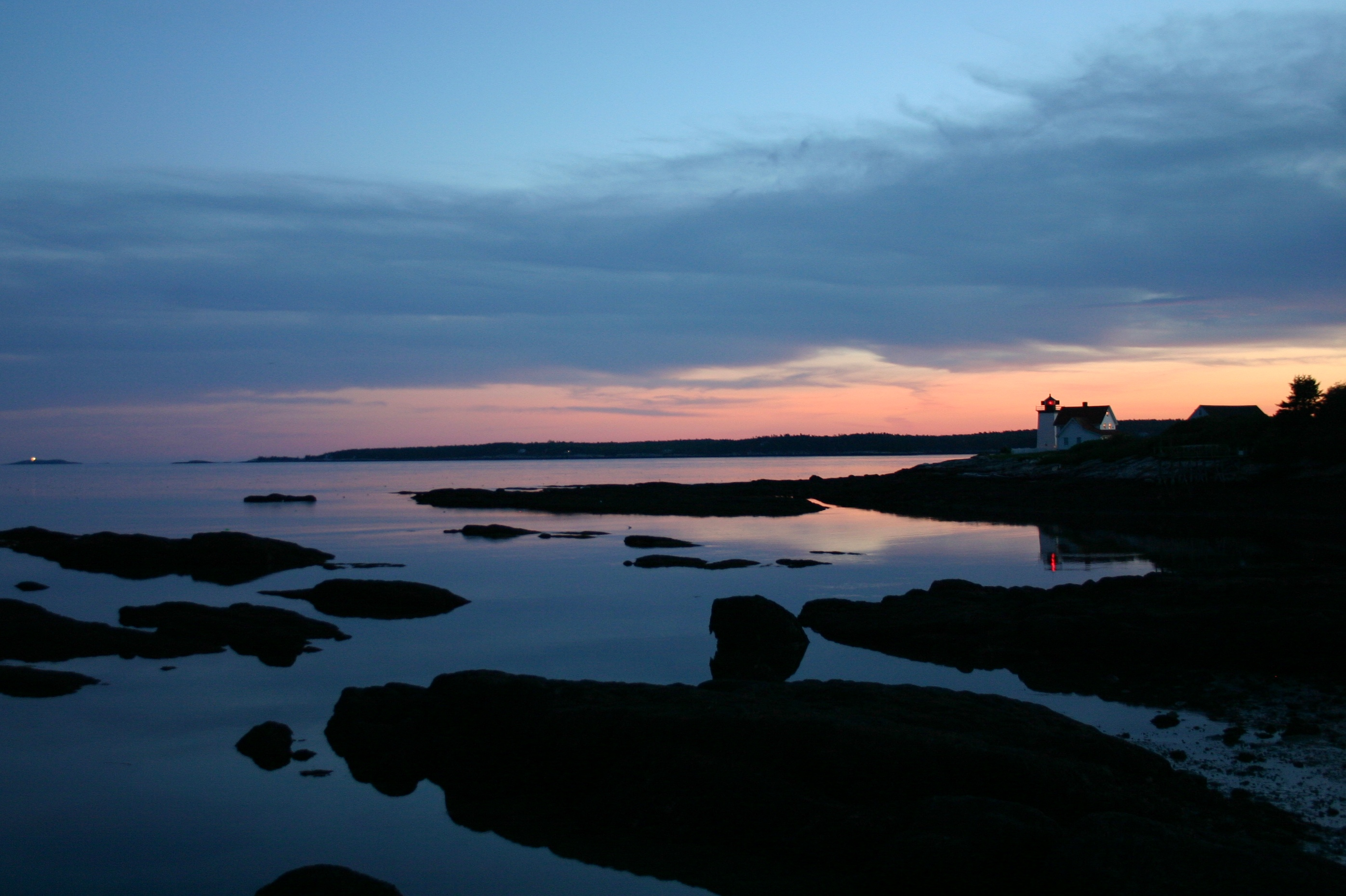
Hendricks Head Light at sunset

Southport is a town and island in Lincoln County, Maine, United States. The population was 622 at the 2020 census. It includes the neighborhoods of Cozy Harbor, Newagen, Pine Cliff, West Southport, and the Capitol Island and Squirrel Island summer colonies. The majority of the town's residents live on its main island, Southport Island.

== History ==
The Abenaki people who originally inhabited the island called it Capanewagen. Cape Newagen, an English corruption of the Abenaki name, was the name of an early English fishing outpost at the southern tip of the island. The island would later be known as Newagen Island by Europeans.

While the first European settlement was established in 1623, the island was abandoned by the English when they were driven from the region by the Abenaki during King Phillip's War in 1676. After the war, colonists returned to the island, only to be driven out again during King William's War in 1689.

After 40 years, colonists again returned to the region in 1730, and established a settlement called Townsend, named after Lord Charles Townshend. In 1764, the settlement was officially incorporated as the town of Boothbay. On February 12, 1842, the island split from Boothbay, becoming incorporated as Townsend. On June 12, 1850, Townsend changed its name to Southport, after Southport, England.

== Geography ==
According to the United States Census Bureau, the town has a total area of 23.16 square miles (59.98 km^{2}), of which 5.38 square miles (13.93 km^{2}) is land and 17.78 square miles (46.05 km^{2}) is water. Southport is on Southport Island, in the mouth of the Sheepscot River. The islands of Southport include the Ark, Boston Island, Burnt Island, Cape Island, Capitol Island, Cedarbush Island, the Cuckolds, David Island, the Green Islands, Hunting Island, Lower Mark Island, Mouse Island, Pratts Island, Southport Island, and Squirrel Island.

The main island is crossed by state routes 27 and 238. Southport Island is connected by a green swing bridge to the adjacent town of Boothbay Harbor.

== Demographics ==
Historical population
Census	Pop.	Note	%±
1850	543		—
1860	708		30.4%
1870	684		−3.4%
1880	679		−0.7%
1890	533		−21.5%
1900	527		−1.1%
1910	409		−22.4%
1920	272		−33.5%
1930	412		51.5%
1940	405		−1.7%
1950	435		7.4%
1960	416		−4.4%
1970	473		13.7%
1980	598		26.4%
1990	645		7.9%
2000	684		6.0%
2010	606		−11.4%
2020	622		2.6%
U.S. Decennial Census

=== 2010 census ===
As of the census of 2010, there were 606 people, 316 households, and 195 families living in the town. The population density was 112.6 inhabitants per square mile (43.5/km^{2}). There were 1,051 housing units at an average density of 195.4 per square mile (75.4/km^{2}). The racial makeup of the town was 96.5% White, 1.7% from two or more races, 1.3% Asian, 0.3% African American and 0.2% Native American. Hispanic and/or Latino of any race were 0.2% of the population.

There were 316 households, of which 14.2% had children under the age of 18 living with them, 55.1% were married couples living together, 4.7% had a female householder with no husband present, 1.9% had a male householder with no wife present, and 38.3% were non-families. 33.2% of all households were made up of individuals, and 18.4% had someone living alone who was 65 years of age or older. The average household size was 1.92 and the average family size was 2.38.

The median age in the town was 60.1 years. 12% of residents were under the age of 18; 2.3% were between the ages of 18 and 24; 13% were from 25 to 44; 35.6% were from 45 to 64; and 37% were 65 years of age or older. The gender makeup of the town was 48.5% male and 51.5% female.

=== 2000 census ===
As of the census of 2000, there were 684 people, 331 households, and 218 families living in the town. The population density was 127.0 inhabitants per square mile (49.0/km^{2}). There were 912 housing units at an average density of 169.3 per square mile (65.4/km^{2}). The racial makeup of the town was 98.83% White, 0.58% Asian, and 0.58% from two or more races.

There were 331 households, out of which 19.9% had children under the age of 18 living with them, 59.8% were married couples living together, 3.3% had a female householder with no husband present, and 34.1% were non-families. 29.9% of all households were made up of individuals, and 14.5% had someone living alone who was 65 years of age or older. The average household size was 2.07 and the average family size was 2.52.

In the town, the population was spread out, with 14.6% under the age of 18, 3.5% from 18 to 24, 15.4% from 25 to 44, 35.7% from 45 to 64, and 30.8% who were 65 years of age or older. The median age was 53 years. For every 100 females, there were 95.4 males. For every 100 females age 18 and over, there were 97.3 males.

The median income for a household in the town was $38,125, and the median income for a family was $52,750. Males had a median income of $35,500 versus $24,583 for females. The per capita income for the town was $33,481. About 4.2% of families and 6.8% of the population were below the poverty line, including 11.2% of those under age 18 and 3.3% of those age 65 or over.

== Sites of interest ==
- Burnt Island Light
- The Cuckolds Light
- Hendricks Head Light
- Squirrel Island

== Notable people ==
- Ralph H. Cameron, U.S. senator from Arizona
- Essie P. Carle, women's suffrage activist
- Rachel Carson, marine biologist and conservationist
- Margaret Hamilton, film actress
- Wilder Hobson, journalist
- Hart Day Leavitt, educator and editor
- George Lincoln Rockwell, neo-Nazi activist
- George Lovejoy Rockwell, vaudeville performer
- Gustaf Tenggren, illustrator
- Claggett Wilson, painter
