= Old Gray House =

Historic house in Maine, United States

- U.S. National Register of Historic Places
- Location within Maine Location within the United States
- Location: 60 Tavenner Rd., Boothbay, Maine
- Coordinates: 43°52′27″N 69°40′51″W
- Area: 2.5 acres (1.0 ha)
- Built: 1753
- Built by: Charles F. Way
- Architectural style: Federal, Colonial Revival
- NRHP reference No.: 07000408
- Added to NRHP: May 8, 2007

The Old Gray House, also known as the Hodgden-Merrow House, is a historic house at 60 Tavenner Road, on Sawyers Island in Boothbay, Maine. The house, probably built in the 1820s, but possibly older (or including older sections), is built on a site that has been in documented use since the 1740s. It was listed on the National Register of Historic Places in 2007.

== Description and history ==
The Old Gray House stands near the northwestern tip of Sawyer Island, a large island on the west side of the town of Boothbay in the Sheepscot River. It is a two-story wood-frame structure, with a hip roof, central chimney, clapboard siding, and granite foundation. The front facade, facing south, is five bays wide and slightly asymmetrical, with larger bays to the right of the entrance, which is slightly off-center. The entrance is framed by pilasters and topped by a transom window and corniced entablature. An enclosed porch projects to the west side, and a two-story ell extends north from the main block. The interior is well preserved, retaining original plaster, woodwork, and fireplaces.

The exact construction date of the house is uncertain, with architectural evidence suggesting a date in the early 19th century. The oldest documentary evidence of the property is a 1746 deed for the entire island, and by 1753 there was a house on the site, which served as a tavern, inn, and store, under the proprietorship of Joseph Patten. In 1774, Benjamin Sawyer acquired ownership of the island, and he continued to operate the businesses on the island until losing it to foreclosure in 1786. The Hodgdon family then owned most of the island into the early 20th century. It is likely that the house was either built or enlarged in the 1820s, giving it its present high-quality Federal period finishes. In 1918 the house was purchased by the Merrow family, which undertook a renovation in consultation with architect Charles Way of Sudbury, Massachusetts.

== See also ==
- National Register of Historic Places listings in Lincoln County, Maine
