= Washburn & Doughty =

Shipyard in Maine

Washburn & Doughty is a shipyard located in East Boothbay, Maine.

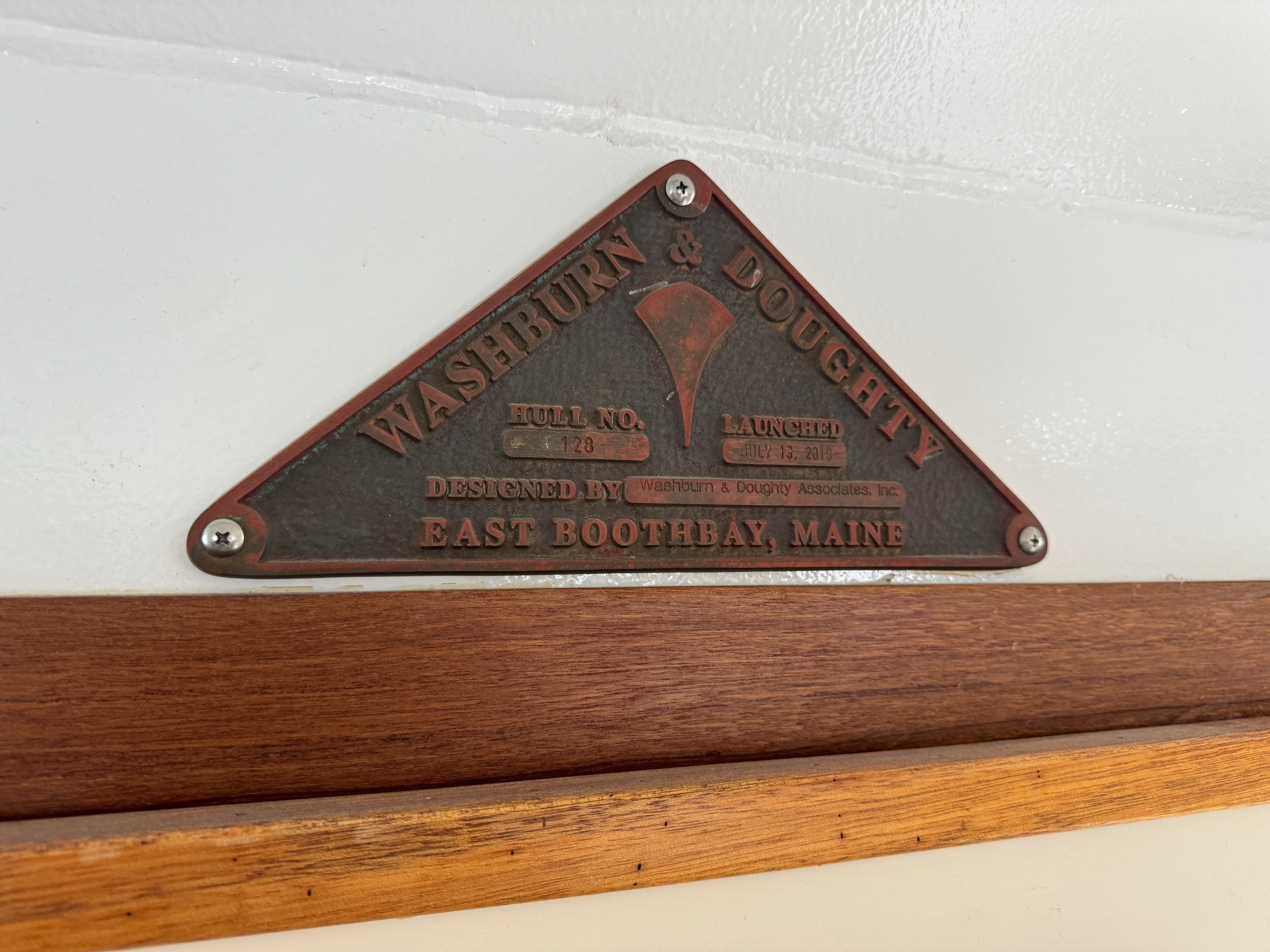
Construction plate aboard the Chebeague Island Ferry, then named The Independence

The company was founded in 1977 by Bruce Washburn and Bruce Doughty, then employees at Bath Iron Works. For the first several years of its existence, vessels were constructed on a lot in Woolwich until it moved to a building in East Boothbay. In July 2008, the shipyard burned to the ground in a fire sparked by a cutting torch. The fire caused an estimated $30 million in damage to the facility and under-construction vessels, and led the company to lay off 65 of its 100 employees. Immediately after the incident, the company began designing a replacement building, with operations continuing at other sites until being consolidated back to East Boothbay the following year. In 2016, the company began planning to expand to a site in Brunswick, Maine on the former Naval Air Station Brunswick, where it would locate steel cutting and some fabrication operations.

Washburn & Doughty initially constructed primarily fishing boats, including some early examples of freezer trawlers on the US East Coast. It subsequently expanded into passenger vessels, and in 1997 delivered its first z-drive tugboat to a design that would eventually be the basis for most vessels built by the company—by 2018, Washburn & Doughty had delivered over 50 such tugboats. Led by Bruce Washburn, who was educated as a naval architect, the company designs about three quarters of the ships it builds. Since 2000, the company has built almost exclusively tugboats, becoming the largest builder of them on the East Coast by 2007 and holding just under 30% of the market in 2016. In 2018, it was awarded its first ferry construction contract since the 1990s for a 154 feet (47 m) vehicle and passenger ferry, to enter service in 2020 for the Maine Department of Transportation.

== See also ==
- Edward J. Moran
- The Independence
