= Brenda Bettinson =

British-American artist

- Born: 1929; King's Lynn, England
- Died: November 2021; Barters Island, Maine, USA

Brenda Bettinson (born 1929) is a British-American artist, muralist, radio station art editor, and professor.

== Biography ==
Bettinson was born in 1929 in King's Lynn, England. Her father Randall C. Bettinson served in the Royal Engineers Regiment. Bettinson studied art in London, Paris and Rome. In London she studied at Saint Martin's School of Art and passed her exam in 'Arts and Crafts' in 1948. Then from 1948 to 1950, Bettinson attended the Central School of Arts + Crafts. In Paris Bettinson studied at the Academie de la Grande Chaumiere under figure painter Edouard Goerg and then at the Sorbonne she studied and collaborated with Etruscologist Raymond Bloch.

== Career ==
Bettinson's first solo exhibition was at the Twenty Brook Street Gallery in London in 1948. In 1949, she had a solo show in Paris and the French critic R. Vrinat wrote, "...this gallery was showing drawings by Brenda Bettinson, born in 1929. What strength, what a creative and visionary temperament! Subjects such as Acheron, Circus, Idols etc. are for this young girl the pretext for drawings which are extremely mordant, violent, searching, this stupefying artist has it all-technical skills and creative personality-to go far, very far."

She painted numerous murals and large panels on commission including works for the Vatican Pavilion at the 1964 New York World's Fair and at Calvary Hospital in the Bronx. Bettinson was the art editor for Riverside Radio WRVR-FM, New York from 1961 to 1965. Later she served as professor of art at Pace University in New York for 27 years until her retirement in 1990 as professor emeritus. Bettinson lectured at the Katonah Gallery, New York and taught in its docent program and was a Society for the Renewal of Christian Art consultant. She won the gold medal from the National Arts Club, New York in 1966.

After retiring from the academic world, Bettinson moved to Barter's Island, Maine and continued to produce work. In addition to Mathias Fine Art gallery in Trevett, Bettinson has shown her work at Unity College, Bates College, the Center for Maine Contemporary Art, the Ogunquit Museum of American Art and the Holocaust and Human Rights Center of Maine on the campus of the University of Maine at Augusta.

In her final years Bettinson's studio output had focused on imagery about war. "Seeking a way to express antiwar feelings brought on by the military conflicts in Iraq, Afghanistan and elsewhere...She started with the Trojan War, and in 2015 she began the first of two series related to World War I." Her last series of paintings is called Ravensbrück: You Are Not Forgotten. This series dealt with the conditions in the Second World War women's concentration camp at Ravensbrück.
