= The Cuckolds Light =

Lighthouse in Maine, US

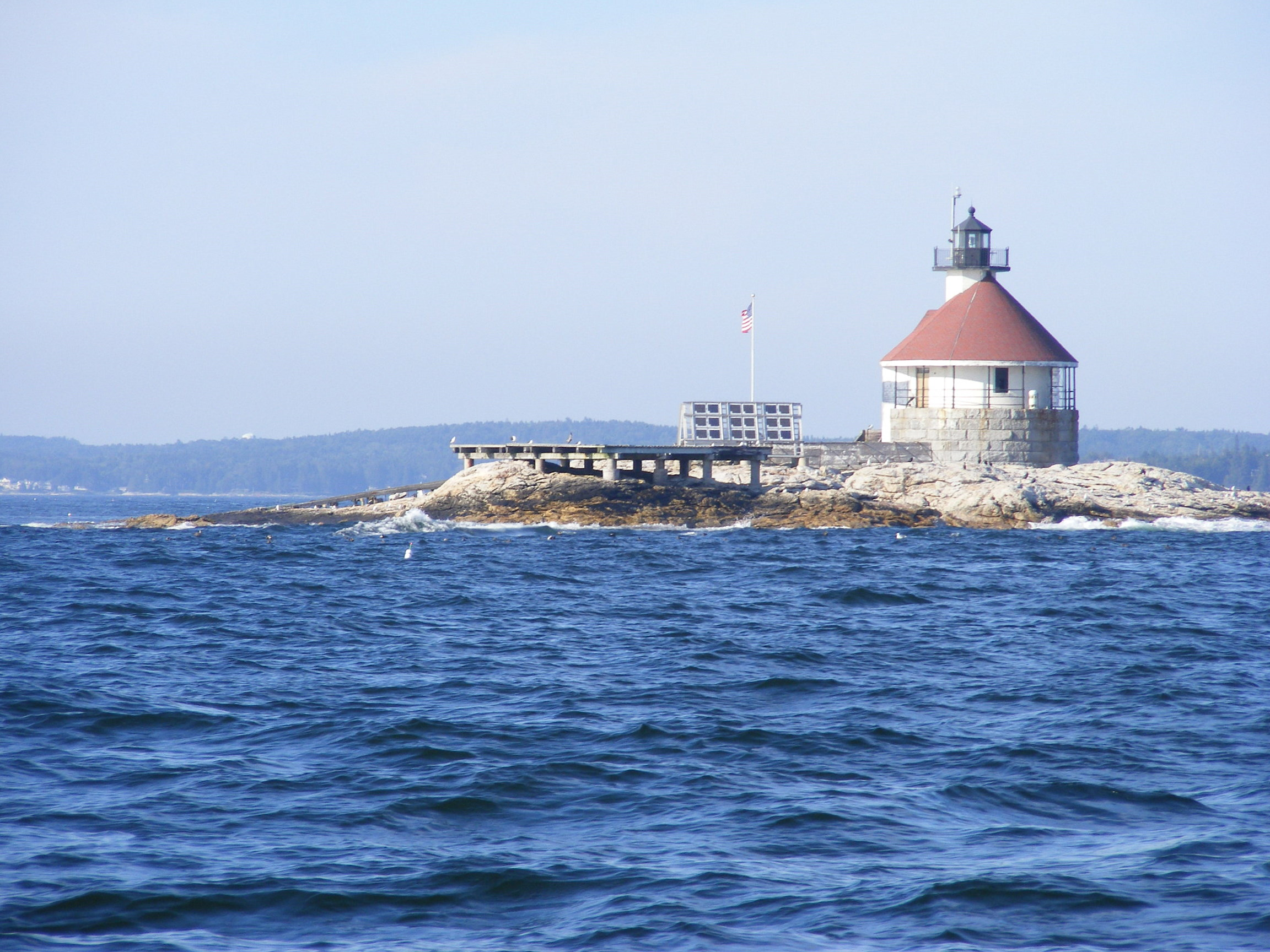
- Location: Boothbay Harbor, Maine
- Coordinates: 43°46′46.2″N 69°39′0.017″W

Tower
- Constructed: 1892
- Automated: 1975
- Height: 14.5 m (48 ft)
- Shape: Octagonal Tower on Dwelling
- Markings: White
- Heritage: National Register of Historic Places listed place
- Fog signal: HORN: 1 every 15s

Light
- First lit: 1907 (current structure)
- Focal height: 59 feet (18 m)
- Lens: 4th order Fresnel lens (original), VRB-25 (current)
- Range: 12 nautical miles (22 km; 14 mi)
- Characteristic: Fl (2) W 6s
- Cuckolds Light Station
- U.S. National Register of Historic Places
- Nearest city: Southport, Maine
- Area: 7 acres (2.8 ha)
- Built: 1892
- MPS: Light Stations of the United States MPS
- NRHP reference No.: 02001413
- Added to NRHP: December 2, 2002

The Cuckolds Light, known as the Cuckolds Island Fog Signal and Light Station or just Cuckolds Light Station, is a lighthouse located on the eastern pair of islets known as the "Cuckolds" in Lincoln County, Maine, United States. The islets are southeast and in sight of Cape Island, that is just off the southern tip of Cape Newagen on Southport Island, south of Booth Bay, that leads to Boothbay Harbor, Maine.

The fog station was first established as a daymark on November 16, 1892, for marking the islets and Collector ledge replacing a 57-foot-tall wooden tripod. In 1893, a bell was installed and a light was added in 1907. The keeper's house was demolished following the 1974 decommission, but was rebuilt from 2010 to 2014, along with the wharf, and the lighthouse restored.

The Cuckolds Light was added to the National Register of Historic Places as Cuckolds Light Station on December 2, 2002.

== History ==
The United States Congress appropriated funding through the Lighthouse commission and authorized the building of the lighthouse August 30, 1890, but the $25,000 funding was not provided until March 3, 1891. The station commenced operation in 1892 with duplicated four horsepower coal-fired engines, compressors, and tanks, along with hot air first-order Daboll trumpets. Material for construction included 105 yards of granite, 60,000 bricks, 430 casks of cement, 100 tons of sand, 200 tons of broken stone and pebbles, 70,000 feet of lumber, and included 3,400 pounds of wrought-iron work. The granite was used for the foundation and the lighthouse was attached to this for stability. A radio transmitter was installed in 1956.

=== Light ===
In 1907, a Fourth-order Fresnel lens was installed. The early coal-fired system used approximately seven tons of coal to run approximately 1000 hours and when converted to oil, ran 423 hours on 195 gallons of oil. The original 24,000 candlepower, provided by an incandescent oil vapor lamp, was increased to 30,000 candlepower powered by an electric lamp and the fourth-order lens, and by 1971 to 500,000 candlepower.

=== Deactivation and transfer ===
The lighthouse was decommissioned in 1974 and listed as United States Coast Guard surplus property. The non-profit Cuckolds Island Fog Signal and Light Station Council was formed and submitted a 542-page proposal that was accepted and the deed transferred on May 8, 2006.

=== Current ===
In June 2014 the Inn at Cuckolds Lighthouse opened, being rebuilt as well as the lighthouse restored, and was advertised as a luxurious retreat providing "pampered luxury" for upward of $3000 a weekend. Transportation to the island would be provided in a restored United States Navy whaleboat. The Inn ceased operations in July 2019.

The Fresnel lens, removed when the light was decommissioned, is housed at the Maine Lighthouse Museum in Rockland. The lighthouse is currently equipped with a VRB-25 and remains an active aid to navigation, maintained by the Coast Guard.

== See also ==
- National Register of Historic Places listings in Lincoln County, Maine
