= Allen Island (Maine) =

Private island in St. George, Maine, US

- Allen's Island
- U.S. National Register of Historic Places
- Location within Maine Location within the United States
- Nearest city: St. George, Maine
- Coordinates: 43°52′0″N 69°18′51″W
- Area: less than one acre (listed area)
- NRHP reference No.: 83003646
- Added to NRHP: December 15, 1983

Allen Island or Allen's Island is a 450-acre (180 ha) private island which is part of St. George, Knox County, Maine, United States. it is located near the southeastern end of Muscongus Bay, roughly midway between the southernmost parts of the St. George's mainland, and Monhegan Island.

== Description ==
The island is the largest of a small cluster of islands marking the southeastern extent of Muscongus Bay. To its northwest is Benner Island, from which it is separated by a relatively narrow channel, and to the east, across a wider channel, is Burnt Island (not to be confused with Burnt Island in Boothbay Harbor, where Burnt Island Light is located). The geographic features match those described in James Rosier's account of the 1605 exploratory expedition of George Waymouth, in which landing and exploration of an island is made.

In 1979, the island was purchased by Betsy Wyeth, wife of painter Andrew Wyeth. The island had lost its full-time residents when it was purchased by Wyeth and had become "a seasonal home for two fishing families living in decaying houses on the fringe of the fast-encroaching spruce forest".

Betsy Wyeth died in 2020 and the island (and its neighbor Benner Island) were acquired by Colby College in 2022 as "an interdisciplinary study center."

== Archaeological site ==
The island contains archaeologically sensitive prehistoric sites. It was surveyed by the state in the early 1980s, seeking confirming evidence of Waymouth's expedition landing, and a stratified Contact Period/Middle Woodland site was identified. The site was listed on the National Register of Historic Places on December 15, 1983.

== See also ==
- List of islands of Maine
- National Register of Historic Places listings in Knox County, Maine
