= Essie P. Carle =

Essie P. Carle (1859–1935) was an American women's suffrage activist from Maine. Born in Southport, Maine in Lincoln County, she was president of the Belfast Woman's Club and the first woman to register to vote in Belfast, Maine after passage of the 19th Amendment. A widow, she owned a dry goods store. She was also chair of the Waldo County Republican Committee.
