= Bigelow Laboratory for Ocean Sciences =

Private non-profit oceanography center

Coordinates: 43.859739°N 69.580037°W

- Company type: Non Profit
- Founded: July 1974; 51 years ago
- Founders: Dr. Charles Yentsch; Dr. Clarice Yentsch
- Headquarters: 60 Bigelow Drive, East Boothbay, Maine, U.S.
- Key people: Dr. Deborah Bronk (President & CEO)
- Revenue: 14,444,038 United States dollar (2017)
- Total assets: 62,794,897 United States dollar (2022)
- Website: www.bigelow.org

Bigelow Laboratory for Ocean Sciences, founded in 1974, is an independent, non-profit oceanography research institute. The Laboratory's research ranges from microbial oceanography to the large-scale biogeochemical processes that drive ocean ecosystems and health of the entire planet.

The institute's LEED Platinum laboratory is located on its research and education campus in East Boothbay, Maine. Bigelow Laboratory supports the work of over 100 scientists and staff. The majority of the institute's funding comes from federal and state grants and contracts, philanthropic support, and licenses and contracts with the private sector.

== History ==
The Laboratory was established by Charles and Clarice Yentsch in 1974 as a private, non-profit research institution named for the oceanographer Henry Bryant Bigelow, founding director of the Woods Hole Oceanographic Institution. Bigelow's extensive investigations in the early part of the twentieth century are recognized as the foundation of modern oceanography. His multi-year expeditions in the Gulf of Maine, where he collected water samples and data on phytoplankton, fish populations, and hydrography, established a new paradigm of intensive, ecologically-based oceanographic research in the United States and made this region one of the most thoroughly studied bodies of water, for its size, in the world.

Since its founding, the Laboratory has attracted federal grants for research projects by winning competitive, peer-reviewed awards from all of the principal federal research granting agencies. The Laboratory's total operating revenue (including philanthropy) has grown to over $18 million a year. Federal research grants have supported most of the Laboratory's research operations. Education and outreach programs rely on other sources of support, primarily contributions from individuals and private philanthropic foundations.

In February 2018, Deborah Bronk became the president and CEO of Bigelow Laboratory. Prior to joining the Laboratory, Bronk was the Moses D. Nunnally Distinguished Professor of Marine Sciences and department chair at Virginia Institute of Marine Sciences. She previously served as division director for the National Science Foundation's Division of Ocean Science and as president of the Association for the Sciences of Limnology and Oceanography.

== Research ==
Bigelow Laboratory studies the marine organisms that form the foundation of ocean health. Most of these are the microscopic life that drives global biogeochemical processes and forms the base of the ocean's food web — including phytoplankton, zooplankton, bacteria, archaea, viruses, and protists. Some of them are large, like kelp and coral reefs.

Bigelow Laboratory's research efforts are grouped into three interdisciplinary themes:

- Ocean Health and Function: This research focuses on the foundational species that drive the marine food web, such as phytoplankton and zooplankton, as well as the ocean's biogeochemistry, such as the carbon cycle.
- Our Changing Planet: This research focuses on the warming waters and changing ecosystems that result from climate change as well as the development of predictive models that help fisheries managers, communities, and governments prepare for them.
- The Ocean's Potential: This research focuses on the genetic, chemical, and biological potential of microscopic organisms in the ocean to provide new medicines, technologies, food sources, and climate change solutions.

== Education programs ==
The Laboratory's education activities include high school, undergraduate, postdoctoral, and professional training programs. The Laboratory also hosts public events and programs, such as its popular Café Sci series of talks for nonscientists.

At the high school level, Bigelow Laboratory offers the annual Keller BLOOM (Bigelow Laboratory Orders Of Magnitude) program for Maine high school juniors, as well as the BLOOM Educators program to help Maine teachers to bring ocean science into their classrooms. The week-long BLOOM programs offer participants the opportunity to work alongside professional researchers and explore ocean science through field and laboratory work.

At the undergraduate level, Bigelow Laboratory offers Sea Change, a semester-in-residence program for undergraduate students at its campus. Students live in the Laboratory's residence hall, take classes from Bigelow Laboratory scientists, and gain hands-on experience with research in the lab and in the field.

The Laboratory annually hosts a 10-week internship program as part of the NSF-funded Research Experience for Undergraduates (REU) program. Each summer, more than 30 students from across the country travel to East Boothbay to conduct original research under the mentorship of Bigelow Laboratory scientists.
