= Deborah Bronk =

American oceanographer

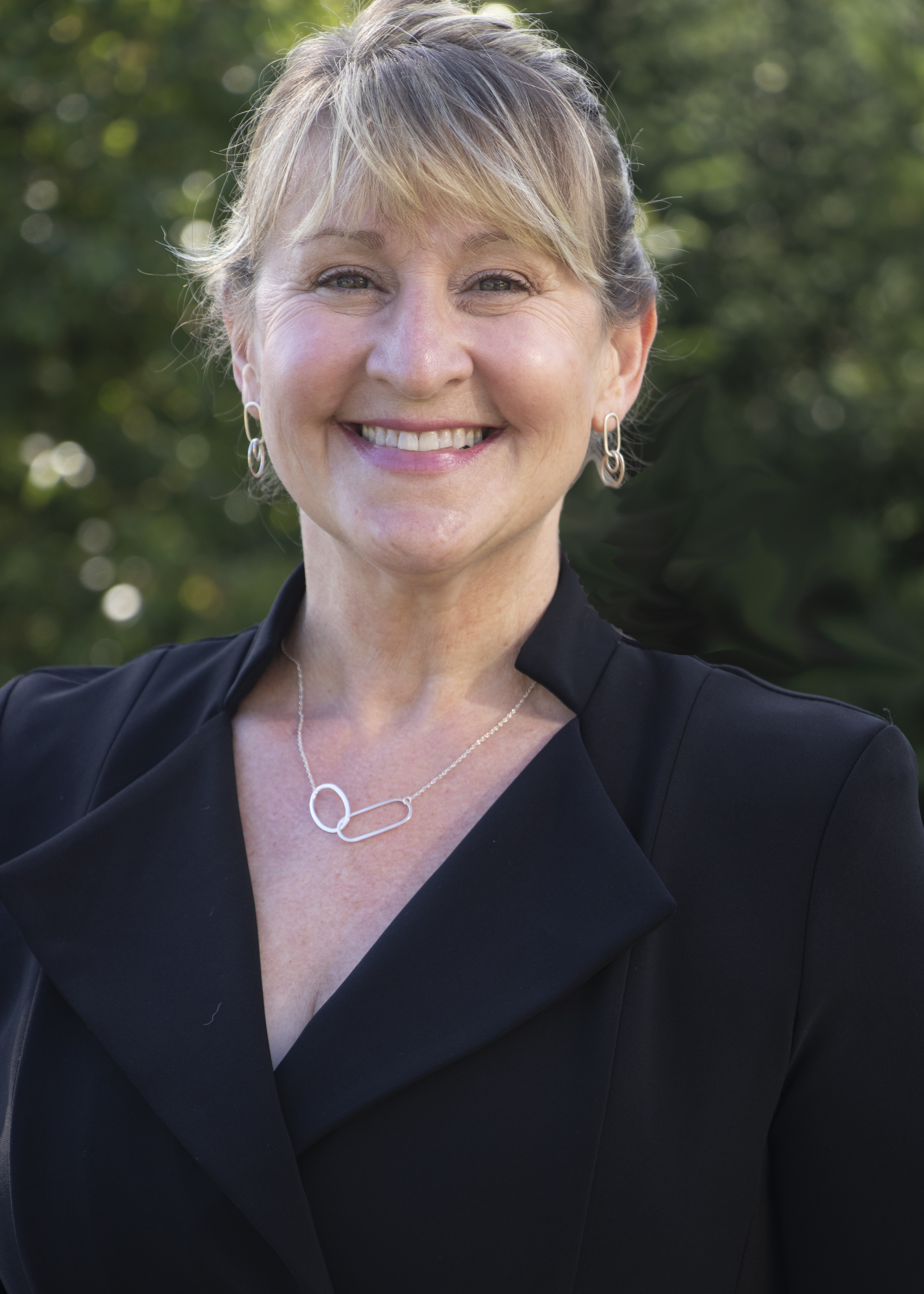
Dr. Deborah Bronk

Deborah Ann Bronk is an American oceanographer and the president and CEO of Bigelow Laboratory for Ocean Sciences. She leads the nonprofit research institution in East Boothbay, Maine in its mission to understand the ocean's microbial engine and to harness the potential of these and other organisms at the base of the ocean food web through research, education, and innovation.

== Education and academic career ==
Bronk earned her doctorate in marine-estuarine and environmental sciences from the University of Maryland in 1992, and completed postdoctoral research at the University of California, Santa Cruz in 1993. She held a professorship at the University of Georgia between 1994 and 2000, and at the College of William & Mary's Virginia Institute of Marine Science between 2000 and 2018. She chaired that university's department of physical sciences for two years until becoming the president and CEO of Bigelow Laboratory for Ocean Sciences in 2018.

== Professional career ==
Before joining Bigelow Laboratory, Bronk was the Moses D. Nunnally Distinguished Professor of Marine Sciences and chair of the Department of Physical Sciences at the College of William & Mary’s Virginia Institute of Marine Sciences. She previously served as division director for the National Science Foundation’s Division of Ocean Science, as president of the Association for the Sciences of Limnology and Oceanography, and as chair of the Council of Scientific Society Presidents, which represents over a million scientists in the US. In 2019, she twice testified before Congress on the effect of climate change on the ocean, before the House subcommittee on Water, Oceans and Wildlife and the Senate subcommittee on Science, Oceans, Fisheries and Weather.

Bronk studies ocean nitrogen cycling and biogeochemistry. Her research interests lie in the ways that nitrogen controls the growth of the microscopic organisms at the base of ocean food webs. She has authored over 90 scientific papers and reviews, and conducted more than 50 research cruises and field studies in freshwater and marine environments that stretch from pole to pole. Her work also extends into the processing of nitrogen within wastewater treatment plants

Bronk has also held two positions with the National Science Foundation. Between 2012 and 2013, she was the section head of its ocean science section. From 2013 to 2015, she directed the National Science Foundation's division of ocean science.

== Selected awards and elected positions ==
Between 2008 and 2014, Bronk served as the president of the Association for the Sciences of Limnology and Oceanography, and she was named a sustaining fellow of the organization in 2015. In 2018, Bronk received the Outstanding Faculty Award from the State Council of Higher Education for Virginia, the state's highest honor for faculty at its public and private colleges and universities. Between 2017 and 2019, she served as chair of the Council of Scientific Society Presidents. Bronk received an Antarctic Service Medal for her research in the region in 1995.

In 2021, Bronk was named President-Elect of The Oceanography Society. Her two-year term begins in 2023.
