= Ram Island Light =

Lighthouse in Maine, US

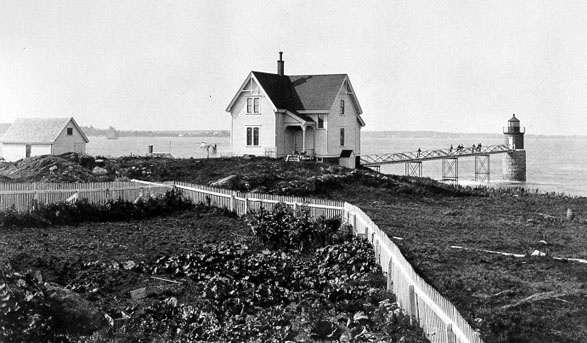
- Location: south of Boothbay Harbor, Maine
- Coordinates: 43°48′14.2″N 69°35′57.7″W

Tower
- Constructed: 1883
- Foundation: Granite Caisson
- Automated: 1965
- Shape: Cylindrical Tower
- Markings: White
- Heritage: National Register of Historic Places listed place
- Fog signal: HORN: 1 every 30s

Light
- Focal height: 36 feet (11 m)
- Range: 11 nautical miles (20 km; 13 mi) & 9 nautical miles (17 km; 10 mi)
- Characteristic: Iso R 6s with 2 W sectors
- Ram Island Light Station
- U.S. National Register of Historic Places
- U.S. Historic district
- Nearest city: Boothbay Harbor, Maine
- Architect: US Army Corps of Engineers
- MPS: Light Stations of Maine MPS
- NRHP reference No.: 87002280
- Added to NRHP: January 21, 1988

Ram Island Light is a lighthouse located just offshore of Ram Island, marking the eastern entrance to Boothbay Harbor, Maine, and the west side of the mouth of the Damariscotta River. It was built in 1883 and automated in 1965. It was listed on the National Register of Historic Places as Ram Island Light Station on January 21, 1988.

== Description and history ==
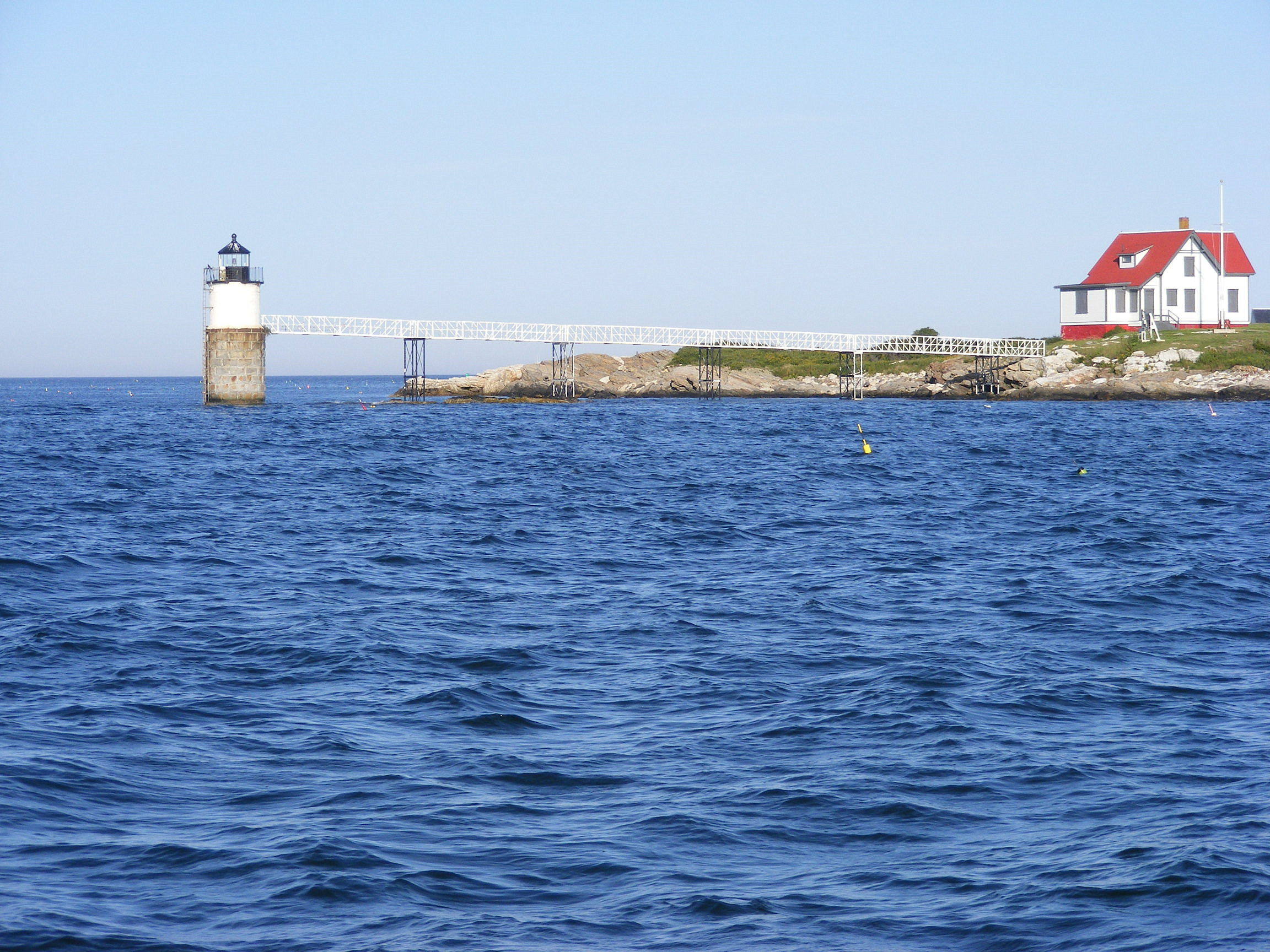
The lighthouse in 2008

Ram Island is part of a group of islands along the eastern edge of Boothbay, extending roughly southward from Ocean Point, the southernmost mainland point of the town of Boothbay, at the tip of the Linekin Neck peninsula. The island is separated by a narrow channel from Fisherman's Island, a long and narrow north-south island. Ram Island Light is located offshore, about 100 feet (30 m) north of Ram Island. The tower consists of an ashlar granite base, from which the main brick tower rises to a polygonal lantern house. The lantern house is surrounded by an iron walkway and railing, and is capped by a ventilator. It now houses a modern light fixture. The tower was originally connected to the island by an elevated walkway. On the island stand the keeper's house, and a fuel house, both wood frame structures, and a small brick oil house.

By the late 19th century, Boothbay Harbor had become a major commercial and shipbuilding center of Mid Coast Maine, with a growing tourist trade and scheduled steamer service from cities further south. This station was established in 1883 to mark the easternmost entrance to the harbor area, and the western approach to the Damariscotta River. The light was automated in 1965.

== See also ==
- National Register of Historic Places listings in Lincoln County, Maine

== Sources ==
- Greene, Francis (1906). History of Boothbay, Southport and Boothbay Harbor, Maine. 1623-1905. Boothbay, Maine: Loring.
