= Squirrel Island, Maine =

Island in Maine, United States

Coordinates: 43°48′30″N 69°37′50″W

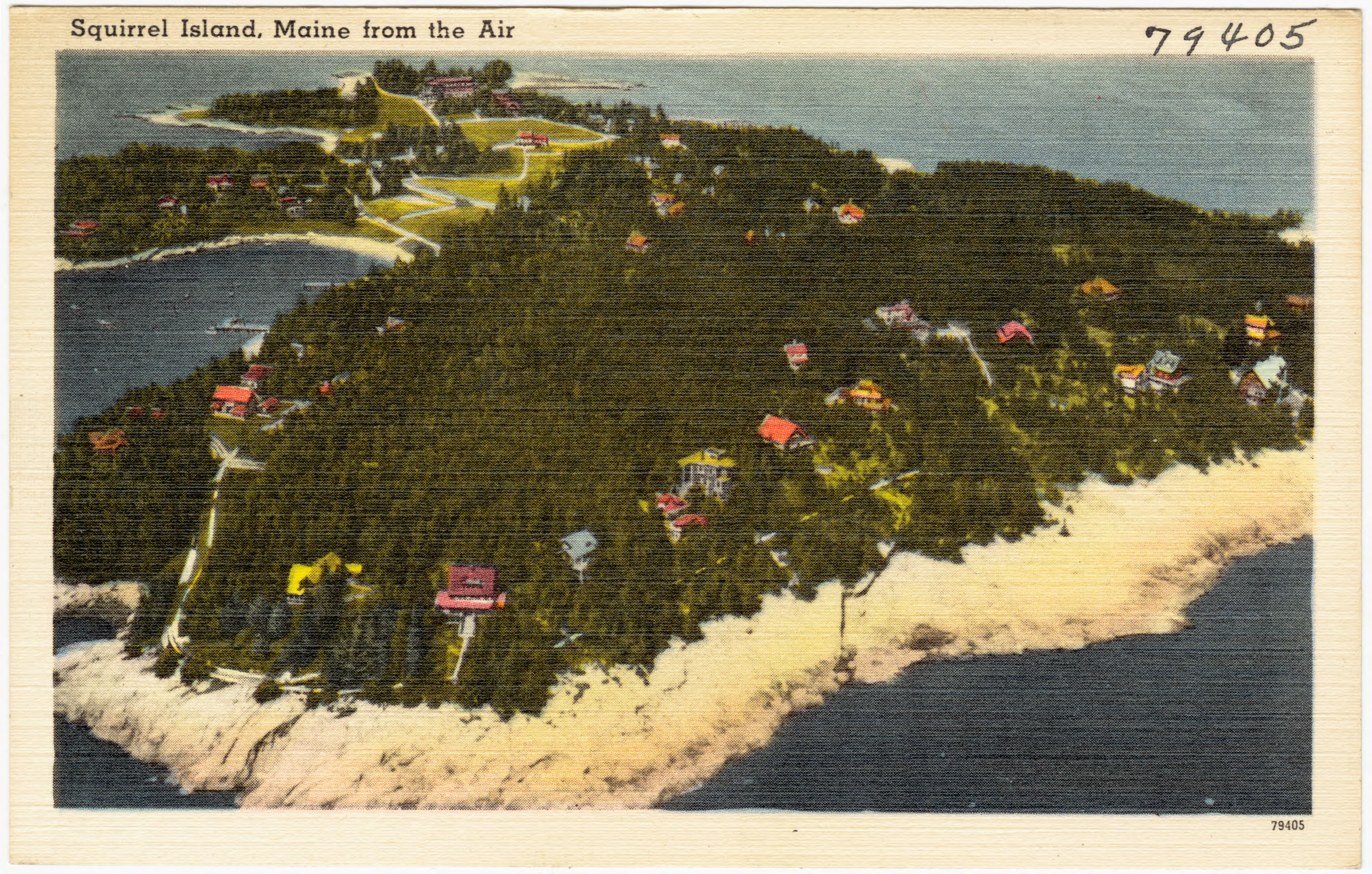
Aerial view c.1940s

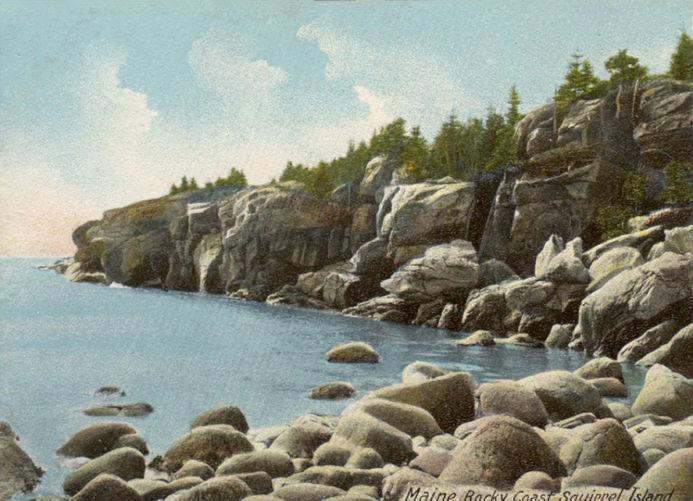
Rocky coast of Squirrel Island in 1906

Squirrel Island is an island in the Gulf of Maine and village within the town of Southport, Maine, United States. It was established as a summer community in 1871. The origin of the name is not related to its squirrel population, since according to island chronicler Charles McLane "[s]quirrels do not inhabit the island (or if they do now, they did not in early times according to local pundits)," but, rather, refers to the shape of the island which, when seen from above, resembles a squirrel holding an acorn.

== History ==
Farmers and shepherds have resided on Squirrel Island since the American Revolution. The summer colony was created with the formation of the Squirrel Island Association in 1871, and the subsequent establishment of a village corporation within the town of Southport, the first of a handful of communities so governed in the state of Maine, in 1903. The "village corporation" adds an additional layer of control within the town government to meet the island's unique needs that arise from the fact that most island residents are not year-round residents of Southport and therefore have no right to vote in local elections. Residents of Squirrel Island pay taxes to Southport, a portion of which is rebated for expenditure on the island, and an additional tax that is locally controlled and spent. Most land parcels are leased from the Squirrel Island Association, subjecting the lease to land-use rules similar to a restrictive covenant or homeowner's association. There are approximately 100 parcels, each with one one-family cottage. Most cottages were first built between the 1870s and 1920s; however, most have been remodeled and enlarged over the years.

The island was once home to a casino and hotel, both of which burned down in the 1960s.

== Accommodations and infrastructure ==
Residents of Squirrel Island vacate during the winters because above-ground plumbing is drained to prevent freezing. Residents enjoy beaches, tennis, boating, a local restaurant, library, and chapel. All island facilities and equipment (including the mooring fields, floats, tennis courts, beaches, dinghies and kayaks) are maintained by the taxpayers of Squirrel Island for the use and benefit of residents and their guests. The island has no medical facilities or stores. Transportation around the island is by foot; residents are not allowed to bring motor vehicles. The island receives telephone, electric, and water utilities via undersea cables and pipes from the mainland. A ferry boat (the Novelty) runs regular trips from Boothbay Harbor, Maine.

== See also ==
- List of islands of Maine
