= Burnt Island Light =

Lighthouse in Maine, United States

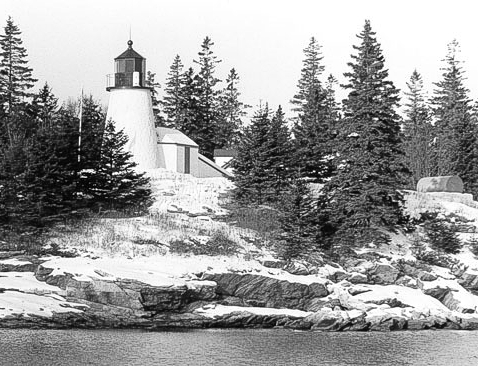
- Location: Burnt Island SSW of Boothbay Harbor, Maine
- Coordinates: 43°49′30.7″N 69°38′24.8″W

Tower
- Constructed: 1821
- Foundation: Surface rock
- Construction: Granite w/brick lining
- Automated: 1989
- Height: 30 feet (9.1 m)
- Shape: Conical
- Markings: White w/black lantern
- Heritage: National Register of Historic Places listed place
- Fog signal: HORN: 1 every 10s

Light
- First lit: 1821
- Focal height: 61 feet (19 m)
- Range: R 12 nautical miles (22 km; 14 mi), W 15 nautical miles (28 km; 17 mi)
- Characteristic: Flashing red 6 sec w/ two white sectors
- Burnt Island Light Station
- U.S. National Register of Historic Places
- Nearest city: Boothbay Harbor, Maine
- NRHP reference No.: 77000139
- Added to NRHP: November 23, 1977

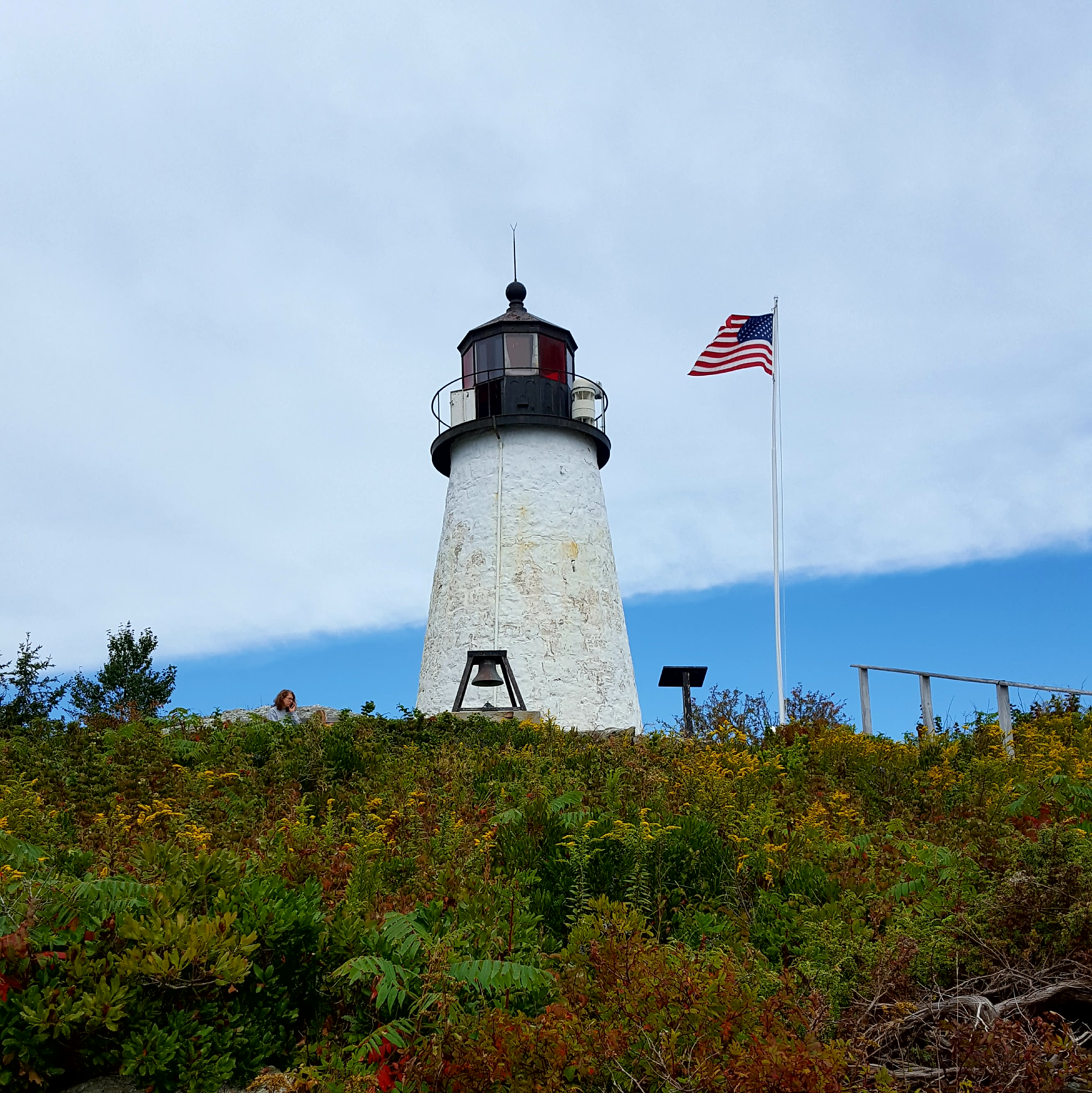
Burnt Island Light 2018

The Burnt Island Light, built in 1821, is the second oldest surviving lighthouse in Maine. It hosts a living history museum run by the state Department of Marine Resources. It was added to the National Register of Historic Places as Burnt Island Light Station on November 23, 1977.

== History ==
Burnt Island lies at the western entrance to Boothbay Harbor, a large natural harbor with the town of the same name at its northeastern corner. The island took its name from the practice of burning the island's vegetation in order to keep the land clear for sheep grazing.

Funds for building a light for Boothbay Harbor were appropriated in March 1821, and a petition by town officials and pilots for a lighthouse on the island met with purchase of the island within a few days. A granite rubble tower, lined with brick, was erected, together with a stone keeper's house, and late that summer the light was first exhibited, using the system of whale oil lamps and parabolic reflectors typical of the time. The original keeper's house was replaced in 1857 with the frame house that survives today; a covered walkway joined the house and the tower. At the same time a fourth order Fresnel lens was installed, the first of many changes in the lighting and characteristic of the beacon.

The original characteristic was a fixed white light; the intent of the light was to attract traffic to the harbor, not to warn of danger. In 1888, the light was blocked in sector to the southwest to prevent it from being seen by traffic coming up the coast from the south until they had cleared the Cuckolds, a pair of rocky islands at the mouth of Booth Bay. A year later the characteristic was changed again, this time to fixed red with two white sectors indicating the safe channels to either side of Squirrel Island. This brought about confusion with the Ram Island Light (built in 1883), and in 1901 the fixed light was removed and replaced with a rotating beacon consisting of a square box with a lens on each face. This lens served until 1962, when it was retired to a museum and replaced with an electrified beacon. It was the last lighthouse in Maine to be converted from kerosene.

A pyramidal wooden tower was constructed in 1895 to hold a fog bell. This was demolished in 1962 when the bell was moved to a metal frame and rung with an electric striker instead of clockwork. The station was automated in 1988, one of the last Maine stations to be manned.

== Museum ==
In 1998, the island and light station were transferred to the State of Maine Department of Marine Resources as part of the Maine Lighthouse Program. The buildings have been restored, as far as possible, to their 1950s condition, and in 2003 a living history program was inaugurated.

== See also ==
- List of islands of Maine
- National Register of Historic Places listings in Lincoln County, Maine
