= Boothbay, Maine =

- Town
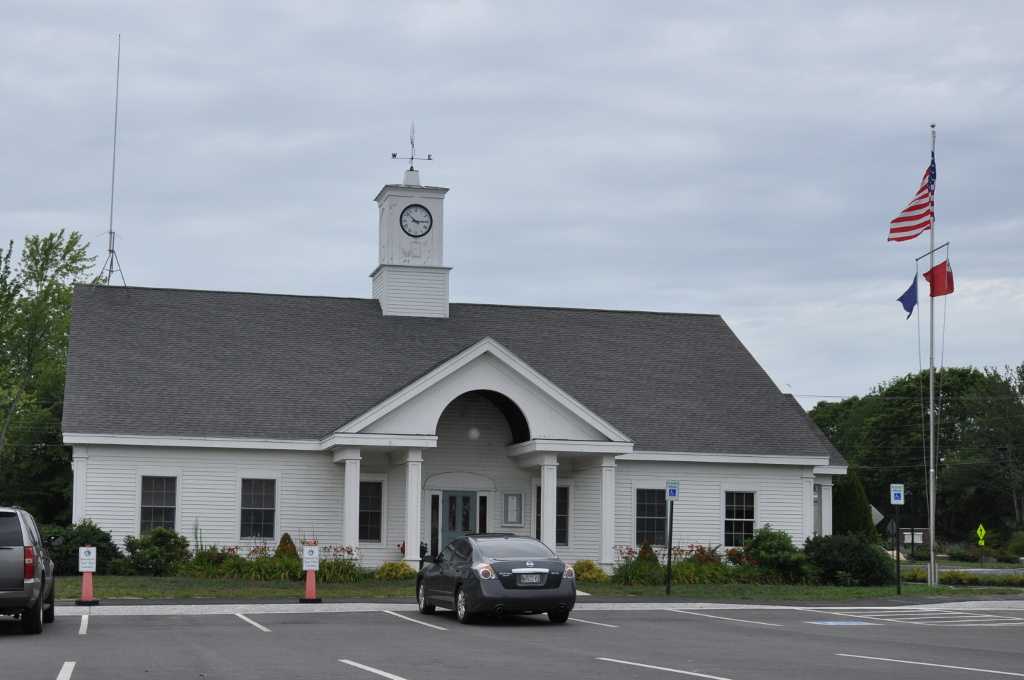
- Boothbay Town Hall

- Seal
- Motto: Pelegrinis Cibum Dedimus (Latin) "We Fed the Pilgrims"
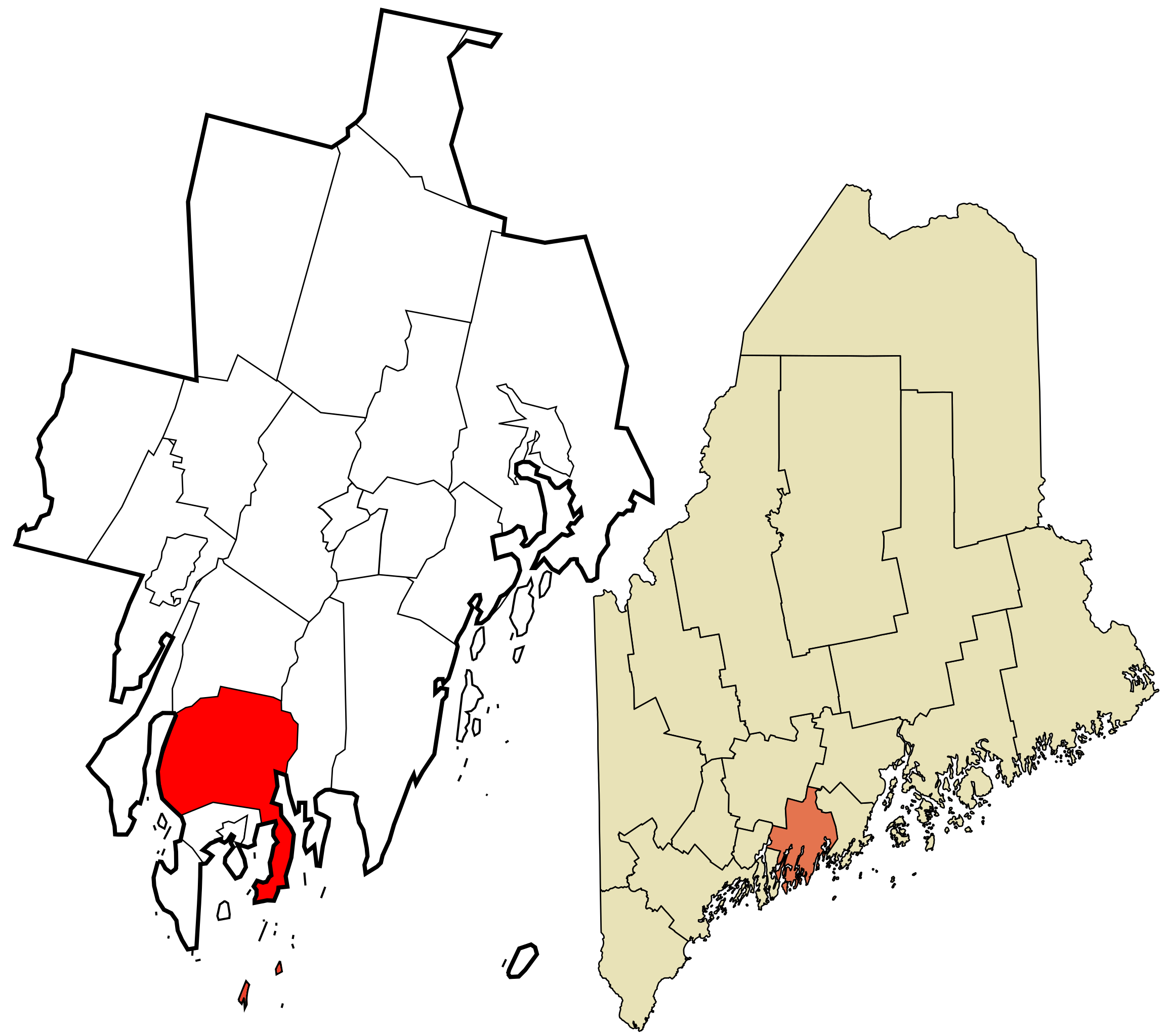
- Location in Lincoln County and the state of Maine
- Coordinates: 43°50′35″N 69°37′41″W
- Country: United States
- State: Maine
- County: Lincoln
- Incorporated: November 3, 1764

Area
  - Total: 71.80 sq mi (185.96 km^{2})
  - Land: 21.93 sq mi (56.80 km^{2})
  - Water: 49.87 sq mi (129.16 km^{2})
- Elevation: 0 ft (0 m)

Population (2020)
  - Total: 3,003
  - Density: 142/sq mi (54.9/km^{2})
- Time zone: UTC−5 (Eastern (EST))
  - Summer (DST): UTC−4 (EDT)
- ZIP Codes: 04537 (Boothbay); 04544 (East Boothbay); 04571 (Trevett)
- Area code: 207
- FIPS code: 23-06050
- GNIS feature ID: 582358
- Website: www.townofboothbay.org

Boothbay is a town in Lincoln County, Maine, United States. The population was 3,003 at the 2020 census. It includes the neighborhoods of Back Narrows, Dover, Linekin, Oak Hill, Ocean Point, Spruce Shores, and the villages of East Boothbay and Trevett. Boothbay surrounds the town of Boothbay Harbor, a center of summer tourist activity, and a significant part of its population does not live there year-round. Five shipyards are located in the town, the largest of which is Washburn & Doughty.

== History ==
The Abenaki people who lived in the region called it Winnegance. The first European presence in the region was an English fishing outpost called Cape Newagen in 1623. An Englishman by the name of Henry Curtis purchased the right to settle Winnegance from the Abenaki Sachem Mowhotiwormet in 1666. However, the English were driven from their settlements by the Abenaki in 1676 during King Philip's War. The colonists returned after the war ended. In 1689, during King William's War, they were driven out again. Winnegance was abandoned entirely, and remained a desolate waste for 40 years.

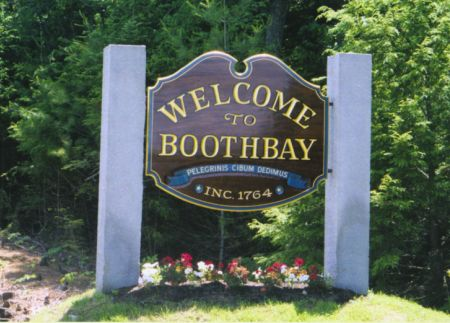
Welcome to Boothbay sign featuring the motto Pelegrinis cibum dedimus, Latin for "We fed the Pilgrims"

Colonel David Dunbar, governor of the Territory of Sagadahock, established a settlement called Townsend, after Lord Charles Townshend, in 1730, and convinced approximately 40 families of Scots-Irish Presbyterians, largely from the north of Ireland, to settle there. Some were veterans of the Revolution of 1688. The settlement survived and was incorporated as the town of Boothbay on November 3, 1764. In 1842, Townsend, now called Southport, split from Boothbay and was incorporated as its own town, followed by Boothbay Harbor in 1889.

== Geography ==
According to the United States Census Bureau, the town has a total area of 71.80 square miles (185.96 km^{2}), of which 21.93 square miles (56.80 km^{2}) is land and 49.87 square miles (129.16 km^{2}) is water. Situated on the Cape Newagen peninsula extending into the Gulf of Maine, Boothbay lies between the Sheepscot River and Damariscotta River. The town includes Damariscove Island.

Boothbay is crossed by State Routes 27 and 96. It borders the towns of Edgecomb to the north, and Boothbay Harbor to the south. Separated by water, it is near the towns of Westport to the west, and South Bristol to the east.

=== Climate ===
This climatic region is typified by large seasonal temperature differences, with warm to hot (and often humid) summers and cold (sometimes severely cold) winters. According to the Köppen Climate Classification system, Boothbay has a humid continental climate, abbreviated "Dfb" on climate maps.

== Demographics ==
Historical population
Census	Pop.	Note	%±
1790	997		—
1800	1,246		25.0%
1810	1,582		27.0%
1820	1,950		23.3%
1830	2,286		17.2%
1840	2,631		15.1%
1850	2,504		−4.8%
1860	2,857		14.1%
1870	3,200		12.0%
1880	3,575		11.7%
1890	1,718		−51.9%
1900	1,766		2.8%
1910	1,700		−3.7%
1920	1,432		−15.8%
1930	1,345		−6.1%
1940	1,370		1.9%
1950	1,559		13.8%
1960	1,617		3.7%
1970	1,814		12.2%
1980	2,308		27.2%
1990	2,648		14.7%
2000	2,960		11.8%
2010	3,120		5.4%
2020	3,003		−3.7%
U.S. Decennial Census

=== 2010 census ===
As of the census of 2010, there were 3,120 people, 1,386 households, and 963 families living in the town. The population density was 142.3 inhabitants per square mile (54.9/km^{2}). There were 2,474 housing units at an average density of 112.8 per square mile (43.6/km^{2}). The racial makeup of the town was 98.0% White, 0.4% African American, 0.3% Native American, 0.4% Asian, and 0.8% from two or more races. Hispanic or Latino of any race were 0.5% of the population.

There were 1,386 households, of which 23.0% had children under the age of 18 living with them, 58.0% were married couples living together, 7.6% had a female householder with no husband present, 3.8% had a male householder with no wife present, and 30.5% were non-families. Of all households, 23.8% were made up of individuals, and 11.9% had someone living alone who was 65 years of age or older. The average household size was 2.25 and the average family size was 2.63.

The median age in the town was 51.7 years; 17.2% of residents were under the age of 18; 4.9% were between the ages of 18 and 24; 17.9% were from 25 to 44; 35.1% were from 45 to 64; and 24.9% were 65 years of age or older. The gender makeup of the town was 49.3% male and 50.7% female.

=== 2000 census ===
As of the census of 2000, there were 2,960 people, 1,261 households, and 881 families living in the town. The population density was 134.0 inhabitants per square mile (51.7/km^{2}). There were 2,046 housing units at an average density of 92.6 per square mile (35.8/km^{2}). The racial makeup of the town was 99.05% White, 0.03% African American, 0.34% Native American, 0.14% Asian, 0.10% from other races, and 0.34% from two or more races. Hispanic or Latino of any race were 0.51% of the population.

There were 1,261 households, out of which 27.2% had children under the age of 18 living with them, 59.2% were married couples living together, 6.8% had a female householder with no husband present, and 30.1% were non-families. Of all households, 23.8% were made up of individuals, and 11.5% had someone living alone who was 65 years of age or older. The average household size was 2.35 and the average family size was 2.77.

In the town, the population was spread out, with 21.1% under the age of 18, 5.0% from 18 to 24, 25.1% from 25 to 44, 31.2% from 45 to 64, and 17.6% who were 65 years of age or older. The median age was 44 years. For every 100 females, there were 96.3 males. For every 100 females age 18 and over, there were 91.9 males.

The median income for a household in the town was $41,406, and the median income for a family was $45,761. Males had a median income of $30,500 versus $28,370 for females. The per capita income for the town was $22,036. About 5.5% of families and 6.9% of the population were below the poverty line, including 8.0% of those under age 18 and 5.2% of those age 65 or over.

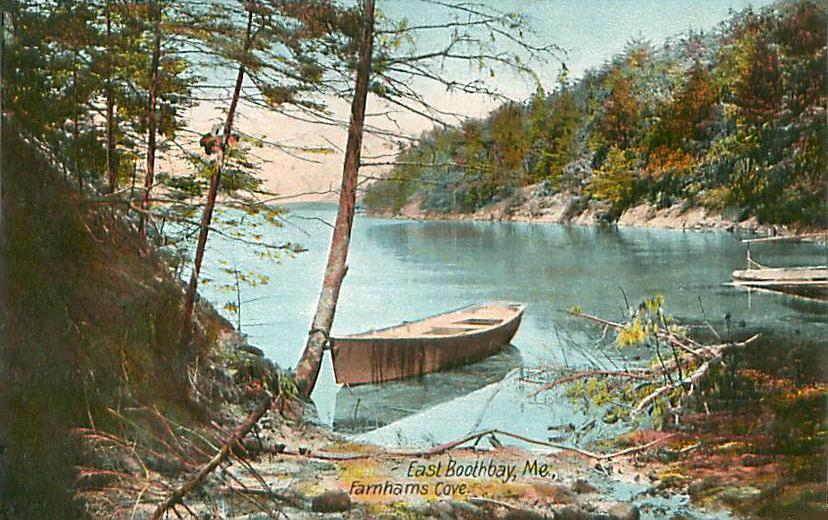
Postcard of Farnham's Cove, East Boothbay, 1907

== Sites of interest ==
- Bigelow Laboratory for Ocean Sciences
- Coastal Maine Botanical Gardens
  - Bosarge Family Education Center
- Damarsicove Island
  - Damariscove Lifesaving Station
- Knight-Corey House
- Fisherman Island
- Hodgdon Yachts
- Old Gray House
- Ram Island Light
- Washburn & Doughty

== Notable people ==
- George Herbert Baker, painter
- Brenda Bettinson, artist
- Cole Brauer, sailor
- Deborah Bronk, oceanographer
- Mabel Conkling, sculptor
- Robert H. Conn, government official
- Francis C. Florini, politician
- Richard Ford, author
- Matthew Forgues, racewalker
- Jane Gilbert, actress
- Woodbury S. Grover, politician
- Palmer Hayden, artist
- John B. Hayes, admiral
- Dorothy M. Healy, English professor and historian
- Paul LePage, Governor of Maine
- Beth Orcutt, oceanographer
- Joseph Pollia, sculptor
- Christopher Reeve, actor
- Daniel Rose, politician
- Dixie Selden, painter
- Holly Stover, politician
- T. J. Southard, shipbuilder, businessman, and politician
- John Welsh, biologist
