= Milledgeville Historic District, Georgia =

Historic district in Georgia, United States

- Milledgeville Historic District
- U.S. National Register of Historic Places
- U.S. Historic district
- Location within Georgia Location within the United States
- Coordinates: 33.078333°N 83.228611°W
- NRHP reference No.: 72000360
- Added to NRHP: June 28, 1972

The city of Milledgeville was founded in 1803 along the Oconee River in Baldwin County, Georgia.

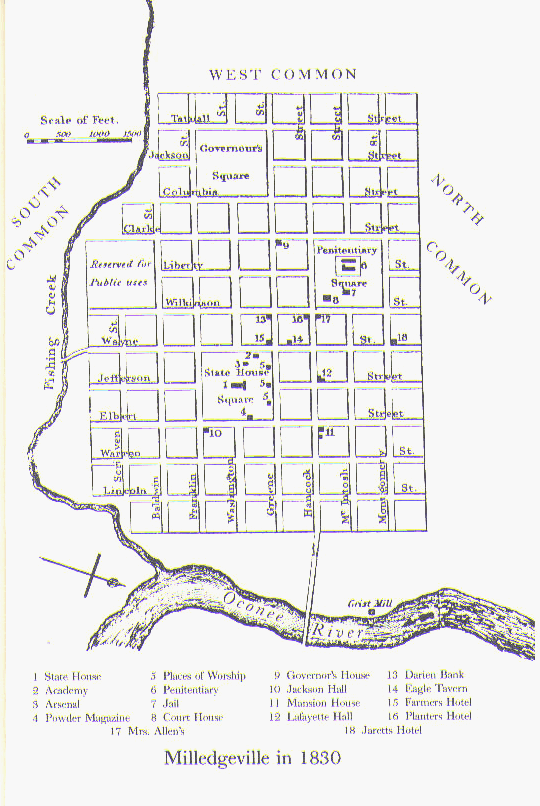
1830 Map of Milledgeville GA

It served as the state capital of Georgia from 1804 to 1868, including during the Antebellum era and the American Civil War. The city layout was modeled after the grid plans of the early US cities of Savannah and Washington DC, due to its intended role as the State's government seat. The capital was relocated to Atlanta in 1868.

During its years as the state capital, Milledgeville quickly became a thriving hub of political activity and cotton-based commerce. Substantial building took place of both residential and commercial structures, within the original grid. Many of these buildings still exist, having changed ownership and use over the years.

To encourage and support continued preservation efforts, the Milledgeville Historic District was listed on the National Register of Historic Places in 1972. The district is approximately the size of the 3,240 acres (13.1 km^{2}) area laid out in the 1803 plan for the city. It is bounded by Irwin St (W), Thomas St (N), Warren St (E) and Fishing Creek (S).

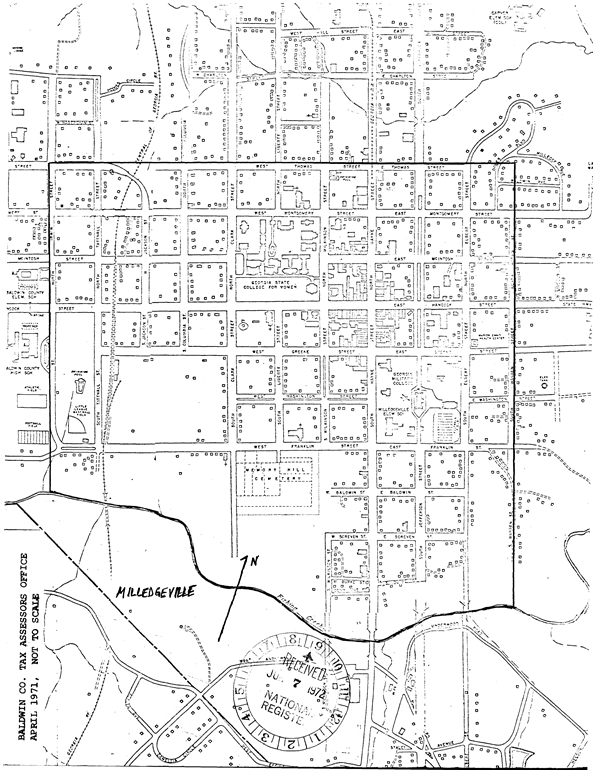
Map from 1972 NRHP application

There is a varied mix of architectural styles represented including: Cottage, Ecclesiastical, English Tudor, Federal, Georgian, Gothic, Gothic Revival, Greek Revival, Neoclassical, New England Folk, Plantation and Victorian.

Within the district there are four buildings that are separately listed on the NRHP: Atkinson Hall (Georgia College), Fowler Apartments, the Old Governor's Mansion and the Old State Capitol.

The district is also home to two institutions of higher learning that were instrumental in the growth of Milledgeville. Georgia College and State University, was originally known as Georgia Normal and Industrial College, then Georgia State College for Women. Atkinson Hall, constructed in 1896, was the first building built on the campus. The second is the Georgia Military College. This was founded in 1879 as Middle Georgia Military and Agricultural College. The Old State Capitol, built in 1807, resides on the campus grounds.

There are currently 46 properties within the district included on a Historic Walking Tour sponsored by Visit Milledgeville. These properties are all within walking distance of the downtown visitor's center and offer an amazing array of building styles and uses. The table below includes all properties on the tour.

Note that the downtown intersection of Hancock and Wayne Streets serves as the delineator of North/South and East/West addresses.

Clicking on a column heading in the properties table below, will sort the corresponding column in ascending or descending order. Commonly used sorts are the "Name", "Address", (Tour) "Stop", (Year) "Built" and "Style" columns. Sorting by the "Stop" column will present the list in the Tour sequence that matches the Visit Milledgeville printed brochure.

The photos displayed in the historic "Then" column were predominantly retrieved from the Nation Register of Historic Districts application (1972) NRHP 72000360 or the Historic American Buildings Survey (1934-1937). The year taken for the remaining historic photos is displayed.

Additional photos for all historic properties can be found by accessing the Wikimedia page for the Milledgeville Historic District from the "External Links" section at the bottom of the current page.

The table below includes all properties on the Historic Walking Tour. Please note that you can scroll right to display all table columns, if they are not immediately visible. The furthest right column is headed "Current Use".

== Milledgeville Historic District - walking tour properties ==
Name	Image	Address	Stop	Built	Style	Then	Notes	Marker/Sign	Current Use
Allen's Market Building		E McIntosh St - 101	36	1911	Federal		local grocery store until 1980s; now part of Marlor Arts Center		community building
Alling-Bethune-Combs-Graciaa House		S Liberty St - 231	19	1895	Victorian		designed by architect E.T. Alling for his family; previous parsonage for First Baptist Church (330 S Liberty)		private residence
Atkinson Hall, Georgia College		W Hancock St - 231	43	1896 NRHP	Neoclassical	1913	oldest building on Georgia College's campus; extensively remodeled 1982		Georgia College & State University campus
Beardon-Montgomery-Gormly-Cash-Higgins-Bugg House		S Liberty St - 241	18	1899	Victorian		designed by architect E.T. Alling		private residence
Beeson-Andrews-Stewart-Roberts House		N Columbia St - 210	32	1898	Victorian		porches on each story were later addition		private residence
Bell-Martin-Kidd House		S Liberty St - 200	24	1898	Victorian & Neoclassical	1936	underwent renovations in 1910		private residence
Blount-Parks-Mara-Williams-Peavey-Callaway House		S Clarke St - 220	9	1818	Federal		originally located on W Greene St; house moved 3 times then restored at current location in 1991		private residence
Bone-Cathy-Knapp House		W Hancock St - 517	27	1921	English Tudor		inspired by Surrey, England home; previously Georgia College Alumni Center		private residence
Breedlove-Scott-Tate-Thompson House		N Jefferson St - 201	39	1838	Georgian & Victorian	1940	remodeled in 1886; original front door crafted from 28 varieties of Georgia wood and adorned with masonic symbols		private residence - apartment house
Brown-Stetson Sanford House		W Hancock St - 601	25	1825	Federal	HABS 1936	originally on Wilkerson St; moved to present site in 1966 and renovated		Old Capital Heritage Center; museum
"Buena Vista" Flemister-Alton House		S Liberty St - 221	21	1893	Victorian		from 1902 to 1993 was owned by the Flemister family		private residence
Case-Flemister-Woods-Pelton House		N Jefferson St - 221	38	1888	Victorian		kitchen remains from 1820 structure on site; owned by same family from 1888 to 1991		private residence
Cline-O'Connor-Florencourt House		W Greene St - 311	12	1820	Federal	NRHD Application 1972	family home of the late Flannery O'Connor; columns remain from original structure; purchased by GCSU		Georgia College & State University campus
Compton-Fowler-McKnight-McElheny-Braxely Cottage		N Columbia St - 151	30	1815	New England Folk		one of Milledgeville's oldest structures		private residence
First Presbyterian Church		S Wayne St - 210	3	1904	Gothic Revival	1904	founded 1822; building constructed in what was known as Government Square; cornerstone from Scotland		house of worship
Flagg Chapel Baptist Church		W Franklin St - 400	6	1976	Ecclesiastical	1864	founded 1830 by a group of freedmen; original building erected 1864		house of worship
Flemister-Roberts-Littleton-Hobbs House		N Jefferson St - 241	37	1820	Federal & Victorian		second story added in 1880		private residence
Fraley-Sessions-Lawrence-Harrington-Sheppard House		S Liberty St - 211	22	1894	Victorian		charming victorian with wrap around porches		private residence
Gobert-Baston-Snyder House		W Hancock St - 520	26	1840	Greek Revival		designed by architect E.T. Alling		private residence - apartment building
Harris-Vinson-Snead House		W Montgomery St - 421	33	1825	Federal & Victorian		owned by Congressman Vinson after Harris family Carl Vinson		Georgia College & State University campus
Magnolia Hall		W Hancock St - 300	46	1913	Greek Revival	1930	originally First United Methodist Church; purchased by GCSU in 2004		Georgia College & State University campus
Major Edward White House		S Clarke St - 247	8	1806	Plantation		Major White served as Adjutant to Marquis de Lafayette; originally on W Greene St; restored in 1989		private residence
Marlor House - John Marlor Arts Center		N Wayne St - 201	35	1830	Federal & Greek Revival		one of four buildings comprising the arts center		Allied Arts offices and Elizabeth Marlor Bethune Art Gallery
Masonic Hall		E Hancock St - 102	41	1832-1834	Federal with Italianate details	NRHD Application 1972	contains unique 87 foot unsupported staircase extending three flights		commercial building
McComb-Hollomon-Waddell House		S Wilkinson St - 138	14	1879	Victorian	NRHD Application 1972	owned by same family until 1982		law offices
Memory Hill Cemetery		W Franklin St - 300	5	1803	x	1937 photo of 1856 monument	notables interred include Congressman Carol Vinson and writer Flannery O'Connor		cemetery
Milledgeville Visitor's Center		W Hancock St - 200	1	1911	Federal	1913	originally US Post Office; became visitor center in 1987		visitor center
Myrick-Jenkins-Harris House		S Liberty St - 220	20	1890	Victorian		unusual asymmetric design		private residence
Newell-Watts House		S Clarke St - 201	10	1825	Georgian & Greek Revival	NRHD Application 1972	owned by same family for over 100 years; purchased by GCSU		Georgia College & State University campus
Old Baldwin County Courthouse, Georgia College		W Hancock St - 201	42	1885	Victorian		different courthouses located in various county locations over time; the Milledgeville building was constructed in 1885; purchased by GCSU		Georgia College & State University campus
Old Governor's Mansion (Milledgeville, Georgia)		S Clarke St - 120	45	1839 NRHP	Greek Revival	HABS 1934	home to governors of Georgia from 1839 to 1868; purchased by GCSU; open to the public		Georgia College & State University campus; museum
Old State Capitol (Milledgeville, Georgia)		E Greene St - 201	2	1807 NRHP	Gothic	HABS 1937	considered first example of gothic architecture in US; site of Succession Convention held in 1861		Georgia Military College campus
Ormee-Sallee-Johnson House		S Liberty St - 251	17	1822	Federal	HABS 1936	considered to be one of the most beautiful buildings in the area		private residence
Paine-Jones House		S Liberty St - 201	23	1820	Federal	NRHD Application 1972	originally owned by Dr Joshua Paine, the physician at the Penitentary		private residence
Roberts-Jones-Johnson/Thompson-Lorenz House		N Columbia St - 200	31	1890	Greek Revival		designed by architect E.T. Alling for Judge Roberts		private residence
Sacred Heart Catholic Church		N Jefferson St - 110	40	1874	Gothic Revival	1890	built with materials salvaged from the Lafayette Hotel, which was previously on site		house of worship
Sallie Ellis Davis House		S Clarke St - 301	7	1890	Cottage	2016	occupied by former Eddy School teacher and principal for over 50 years; purchased by GCSU; restored 2013		Georgia College & State University campus
Sanford-Powell-Binion-Mara-Hogg-Mimbs-Thorton-Sims House		W Greene St - 330	11	1824	Federal & Neoclassical		original fourteen columns retained during 1890 renovations		private residence
St Stephens Episcopal Church		S Wayne St - 220	4	1841	Gothic	1972	oldest church building in Milledgeville; damaged during Sherman's occupation in 1864		house of worship
"The Cedars" Howard-Jarratt-Garrard Baker House		N Columbia St - 131	29	1822	Federal	HABS 1936	the two unusual original Ionic columns are reeded, rather than fluted		private residence - fraternity house
"The Homestead" Williams-Ferguson-Lewis-Oliver-Sims House		W Washington St - 240	16	1818	Federal	1972	owned by Williams descendent until 2003; when built was largest private residence in city		private residence - sorority house
"The Old Parsonage"		N Columbia St - 140	28	1821	Greek Revival		at one time the rooms to the rear supported a second story		private residence
"Thirteen Columns" Stovall-Conn-Gardener House		S Wilkinson St - 141	13	1825	Federal & Greek Revival	HABS 1936	thirteen columns said to represent original thirteen colonies		law offices
Tomlinson Fort House (Milledgeville, Georgia)		S Liberty St - 321	15	1820	Federal & Victorian additions	NRHD Application 1972	Tomlinson Fort (congressman)		private residence - fraternity house
Trinity CME Church		N Wilkinson St - 321	34	1921	Ecclesiastical	1860	originally founded by freedmen in 1860 in building outside Memory Hill Cemetery; current brick building replaced previous wooden structure when congregation moved to Wilkinson St		house of worship
Wooten-Garner House		S Clarke St - 131	44	1900	Classical Revival		corinthian columns; purchased by GCSU; remodeled in 1976		Georgia College & State University campus

There are numerous other historic properties within the district boundaries, which are not specifically on the walking tour. Details on all district properties can be found on-line using the Baldwin County Tax Assessors site.

== Milledgeville Historic District - other historic buildings ==
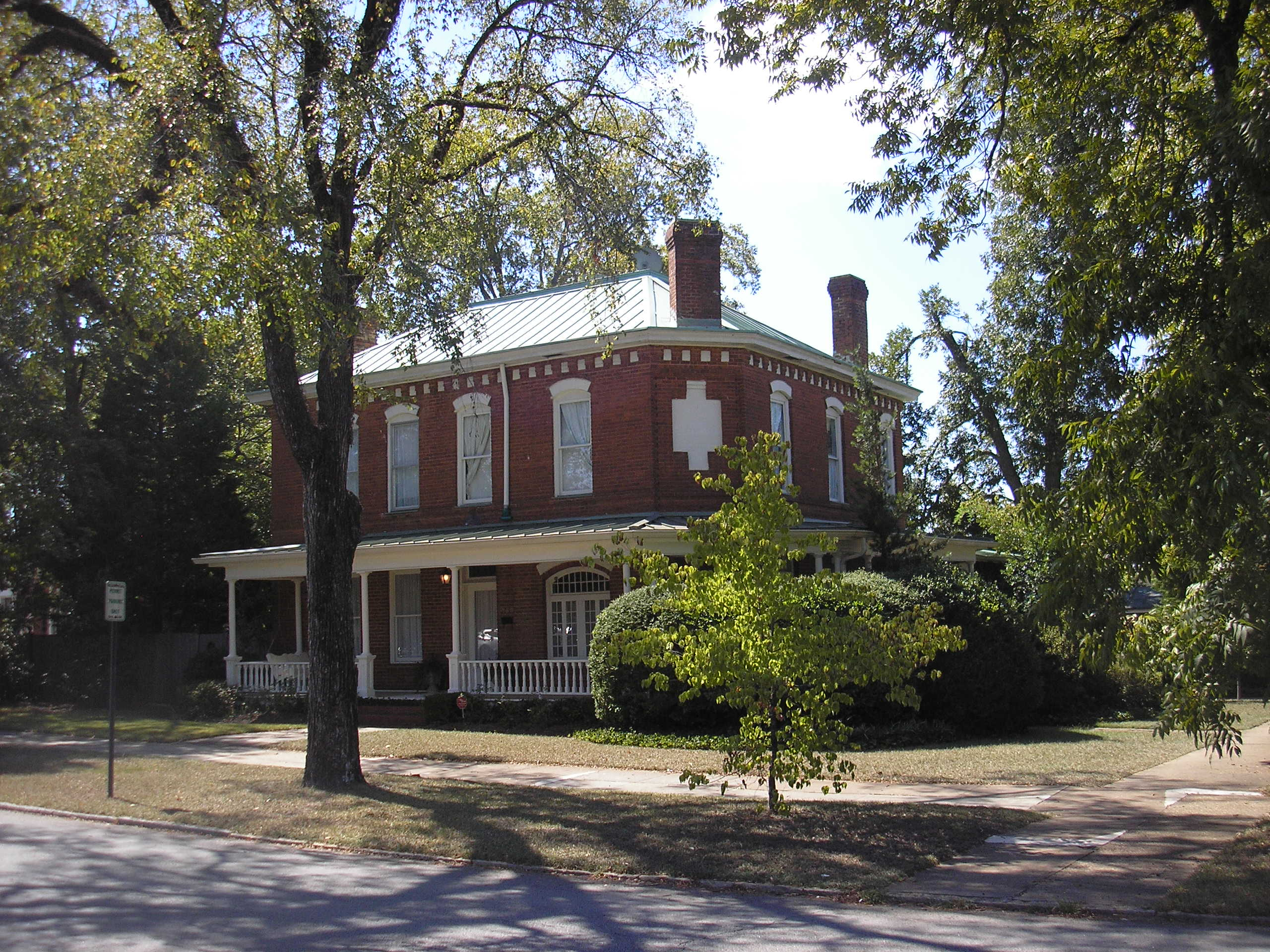
Bass House, (1902) 150 N Jefferson St

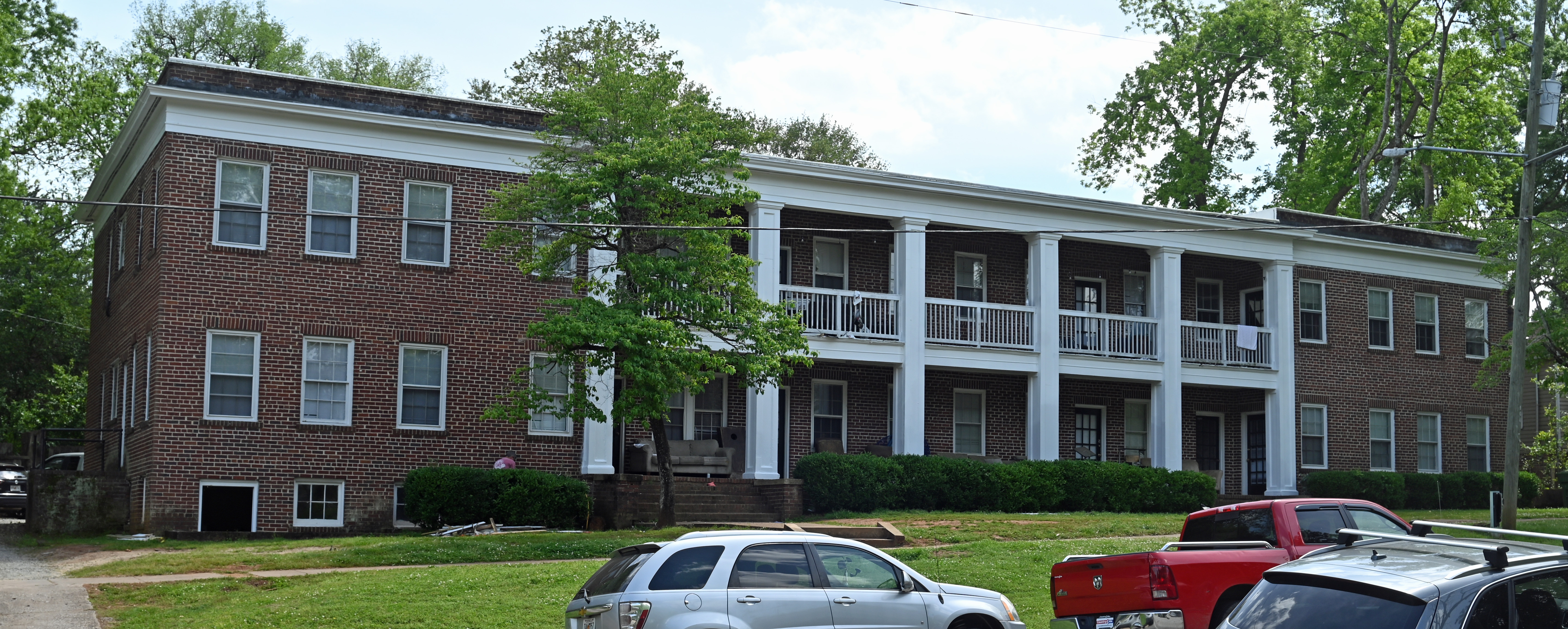
Fowler Apartments, (1930) 430 W McIntosh St; NRHP

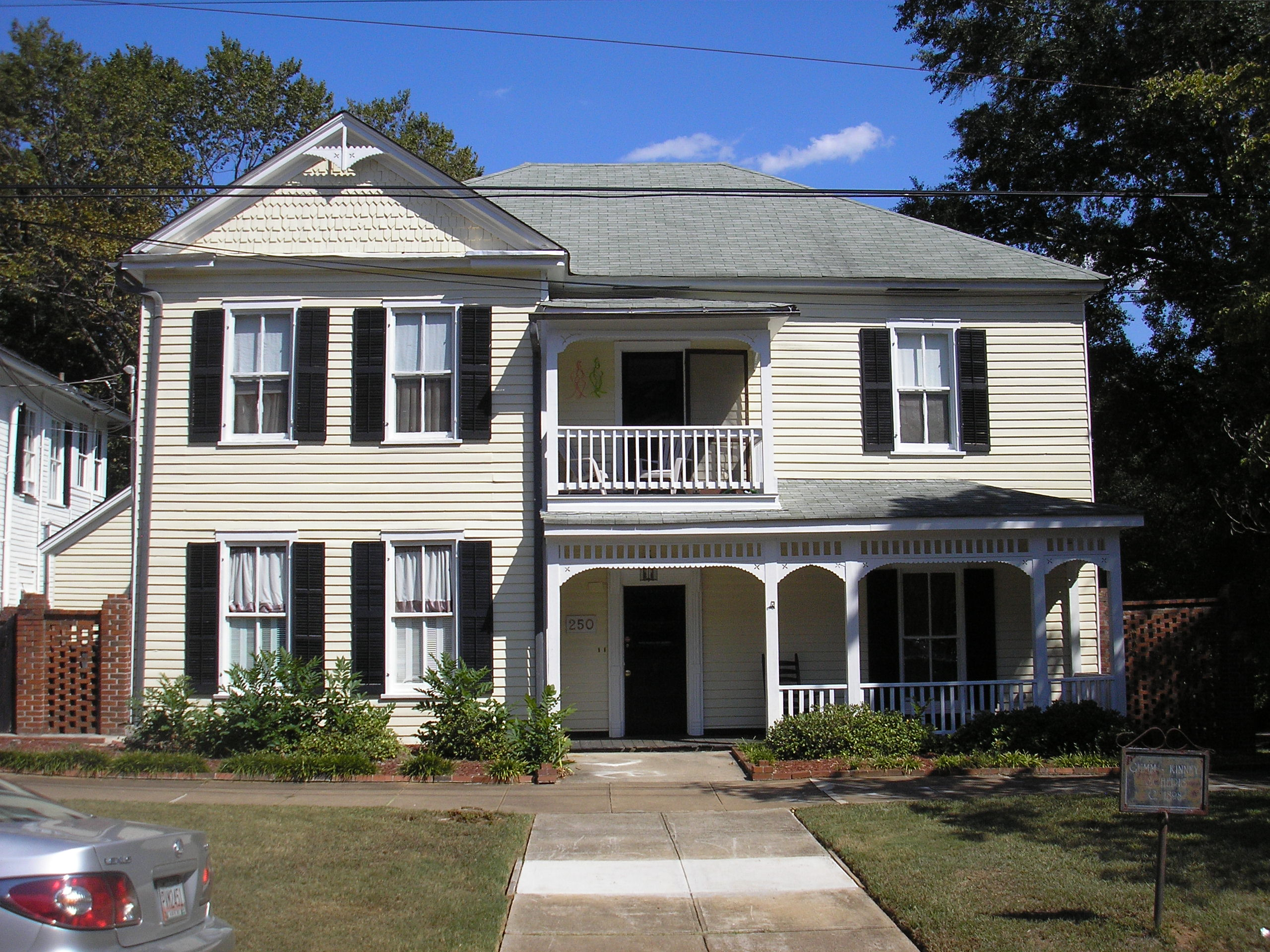
Gumm-Kinney-Shepis House, (1899) 250 S Liberty St

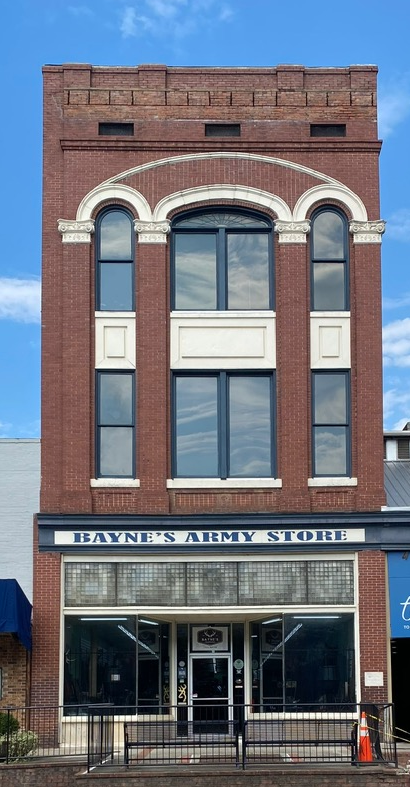
Hatcher Building, (1908) 118 S Wayne St

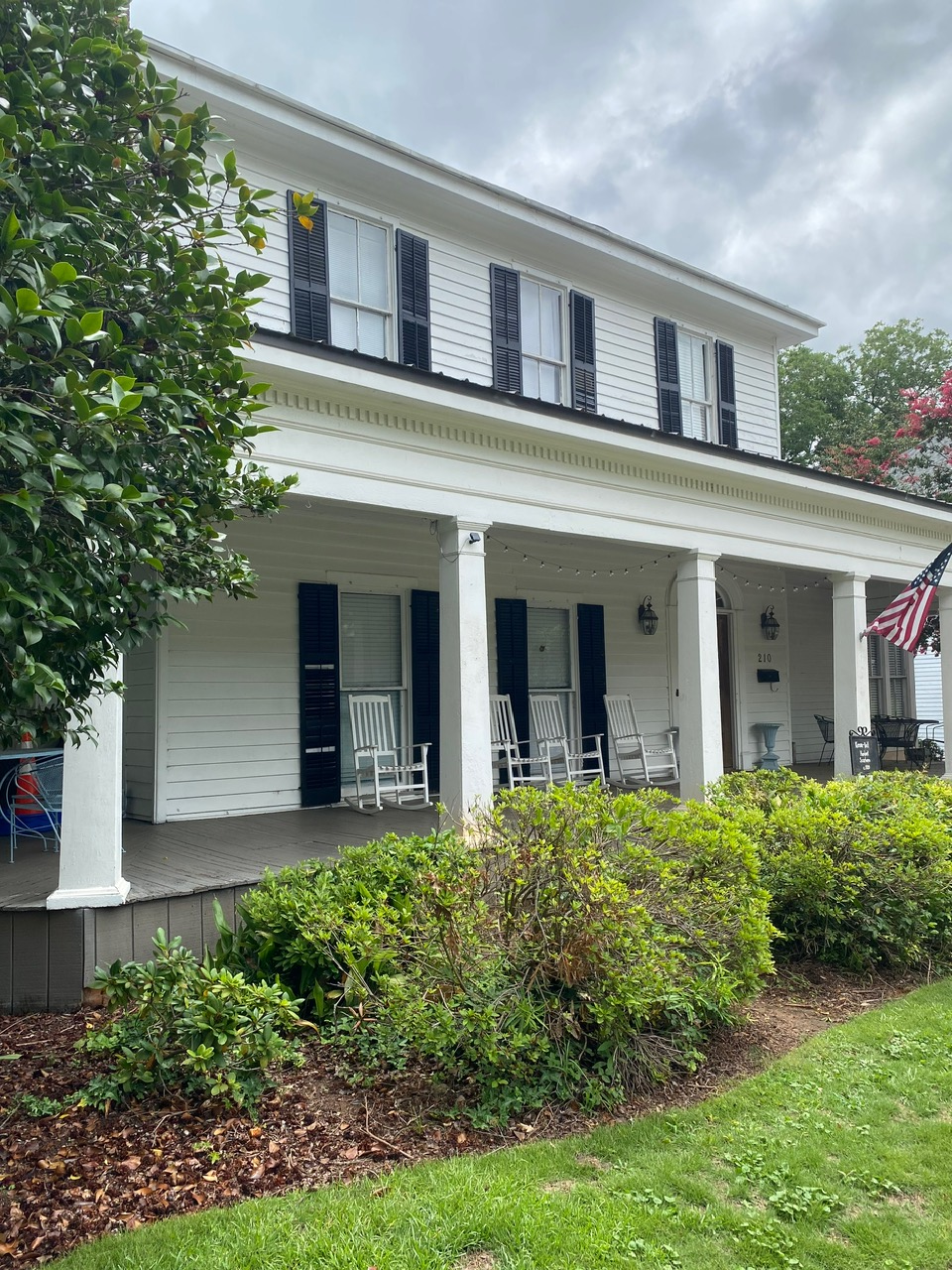
Keenan-Bell House, (1820) 210 S Liberty St

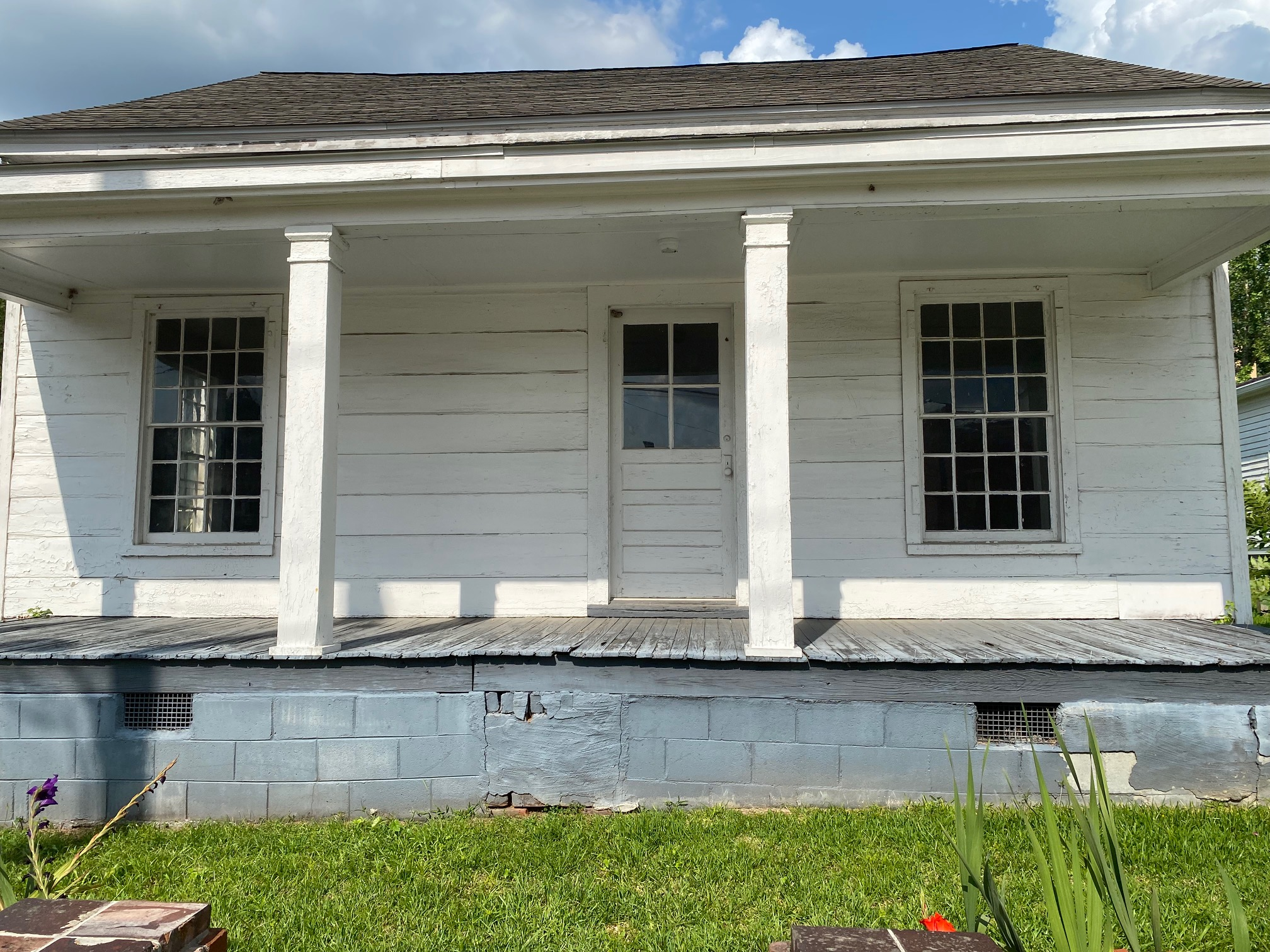
Marlor Cottage, (1830) 201 N Wayne St; Marlor Arts Center

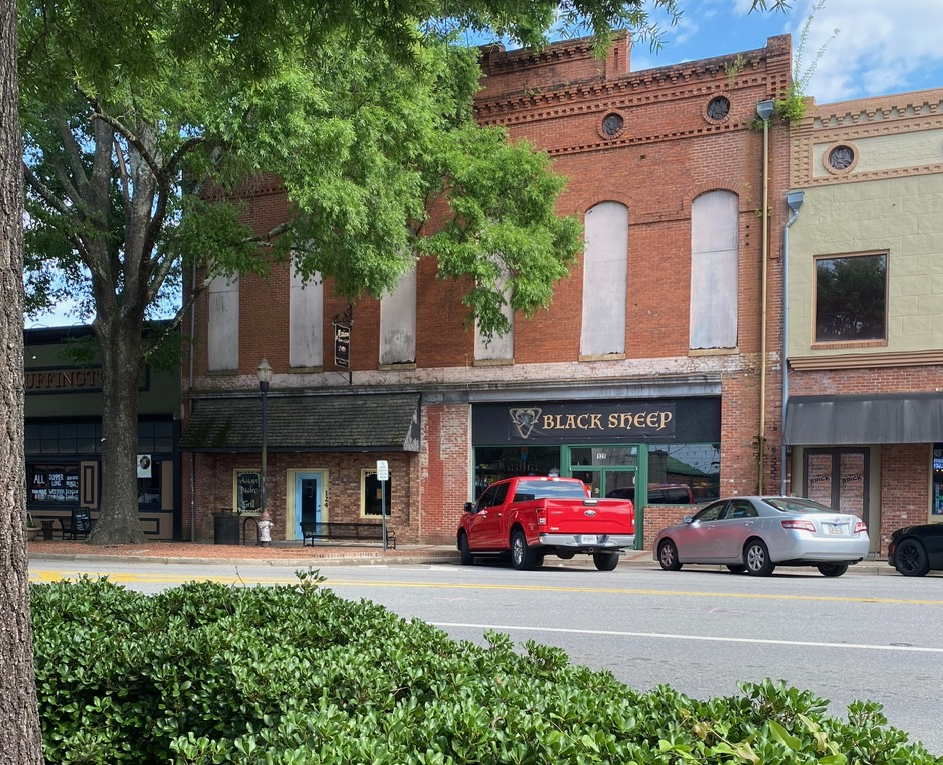
Old Opera House, (1881) 124-128 W Hancock St

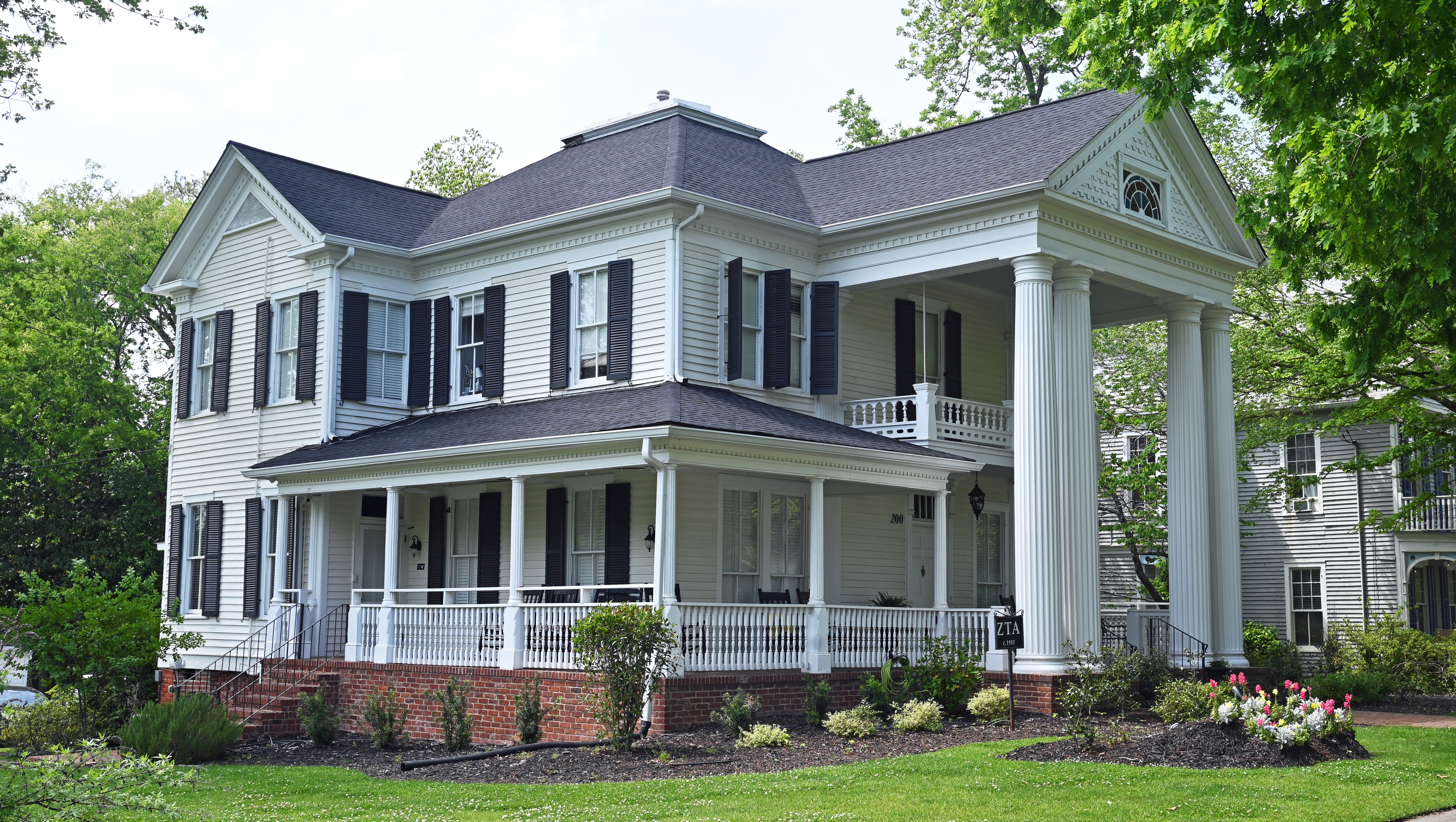
501 West Mcintosh

== See also ==
- National Register of Historic Places listings in Baldwin County, Georgia
