= Rockwell House =

Rockwell House may refer to:

in the United States (by state then city)

- Rockwell House (Norfolk, Connecticut), listed on the National Register of Historic Places (NRHP)
- Perkins-Rockwell House, Norwich, Connecticut, NRHP-listed, also known as the Dr. John Rockwell House
- Solomon Rockwell House, Winsted, Connecticut, listed on the NRHP in Litchfield County
- Stoddard Rockwell House, Lumpkin, Georgia, listed on the NRHP in Stewart County
- Samuel Rockwell House, Milledgeville, Georgia, listed on the NRHP in Baldwin County
- Bertrand Rockwell House, Kansas City, Missouri, listed on the NRHP in Jackson County
- Rockwell House (Dryden, New York), listed on the NRHP in Tompkins County
