= National Register of Historic Places listings in Baldwin County, Georgia =

Location of Baldwin County in Georgia

This is a list of properties and districts in Baldwin County, Georgia that are listed on the National Register of Historic Places (NRHP).

This National Park Service list is complete through NPS recent listings posted May 22, 2026.

== Current listings ==
	Name on the Register	Image	Date listed	Location	City or town	Description
1	Andalusia	Andalusia	February 8, 1980 (#80000968)	NW of Milledgeville on U.S. 441; 33°07′31″N 83°16′04″W	Milledgeville	The home of Flannery O'Connor from 1951 until her death
2	Atkinson Hall, Georgia College	Atkinson Hall, Georgia College	January 20, 1972 (#72000359)	Georgia College campus 33°04′49″N 83°13′51″W	Milledgeville	
3	Barrowville		December 14, 1978 (#78000958)	E of Milledgeville on GA 22/24; 33°05′18″N 83°12′17″W	Milledgeville	
4	Maj. Francis Boykin House	Maj. Francis Boykin House	November 14, 1978 (#78000959)	10 mi. (16 km) SE of Milledgeville off GA 24; 33°00′41″N 83°05′22″W	Milledgeville	
5	Central Building, State Lunatic Asylum	Central Building, State Lunatic Asylum	July 20, 1978 (#78000960)	Broad St. 33°03′01″N 83°13′19″W	Milledgeville	
6	Central State Hospital Cemeteries	Central State Hospital Cemeteries	July 12, 2005 (#05000694)	3 mi. SE of Milledgeville, centered on Cedar Lm, at Central State Hospital, bet. US 441 and GA 112; 33°02′20″N 83°13′12″W	Hardwick	
7	Devereux-Coleman House	Devereux-Coleman House	April 8, 1993 (#93000214)	167 Kenan Dr. 33°08′49″N 83°17′00″W	Milledgeville	
8	Fort-Hammond-Willis House	Fort-Hammond-Willis House	March 25, 2003 (#03000173)	1760 Irwinton Rd. 33°03′27″N 83°13′46″W	Milledgeville	
9	Fowler Apartments	Fowler Apartments	August 21, 1997 (#97000861)	430 W. McIntosh St. 33°04′52″N 83°14′01″W	Milledgeville	
10	Milledgeville Historic District	Milledgeville Historic District	June 28, 1972 (#72000360)	Bounded by Irwin, Thomas, and Warren Sts. and Fishing Creek; 33°04′42″N 83°13′43″W	Milledgeville	
11	Old Governor's Mansion	Old Governor's Mansion	May 13, 1970 (#70000194)	120 S. Clark St. 33°04′43″N 83°13′53″W	Milledgeville	National Historic Landmark
12	Old State Capitol	Old State Capitol	May 13, 1970 (#70000195)	Greene St. 33°04′40″N 83°13′32″W	Milledgeville	
13	Samuel Rockwell House	Samuel Rockwell House	April 19, 1978 (#78000961)	165 Allen Memorial Dr. 33°03′24″N 83°13′57″W	Milledgeville	
14	Roe-Harper House		March 6, 1986 (#77000437)	SE of conjunction of US 441 and Corral Rd. 33°09′57″N 83°16′39″W	Milledgeville	
15	Rose Hill	Rose Hill	April 3, 2017 (#100000821)	1534 Irwinton Rd. 33°03′40″N 83°13′35″W	Milledgeville	Now part of Lockerly Arboretum
16	John Rutherford House	John Rutherford House	March 21, 1978 (#78000962)	550 Allen Memorial Dr. 33°03′18″N 83°14′28″W	Milledgeville	
17	Storehouse, State Lunatic Asylum	Storehouse, State Lunatic Asylum	June 15, 1978 (#78000963)	Broad St. and Lawrence Rd. 33°03′03″N 83°13′26″W	Milledgeville	
18	Thalian Hall	Thalian Hall	March 21, 1978 (#78000964)	Allen Memorial and Ivey Drs. 33°03′19″N 83°14′43″W	Milledgeville	Demolished in 1990
19	Westbrook-Hubert Farm		June 13, 1997 (#97000558)	143 Little Rd. 33°09′24″N 83°20′17″W	Meriwether	
20	Westover	Westover	February 12, 1987 (#87000094)	151 Meriwether Rd. NW; 33°07′50″N 83°17′44″W	Milledgeville	
21	Woodville	Woodville	June 22, 1979 (#79000695)	3 mi. (4.8 km) S of Milledgeville on GA 243; 33°01′04″N 83°14′32″W	Milledgeville	
22	Dr. Charles and Louise Zattau House	Dr. Charles and Louise Zattau House	July 3, 2012 (#12000381)	290 Lakeside Dr. 33°06′01″N 83°14′18″W	Milledgeville	

== Former listings ==
	Name on the Register	Image	Date listed	Date removed	Location	City or town	Description
1	Old State Prison Building	Old State Prison Building	May 8, 1979 (#79000694)	April 26, 2019	3 mi. (4.8 km) W of Milledgeville on GA 22; 33°05′40″N 83°16′31″W	Milledgeville	

== See also ==
- National Register of Historic Places listings in Georgia
- List of National Historic Landmarks in Georgia (U.S. state)
