= Tomlinson Fort House =

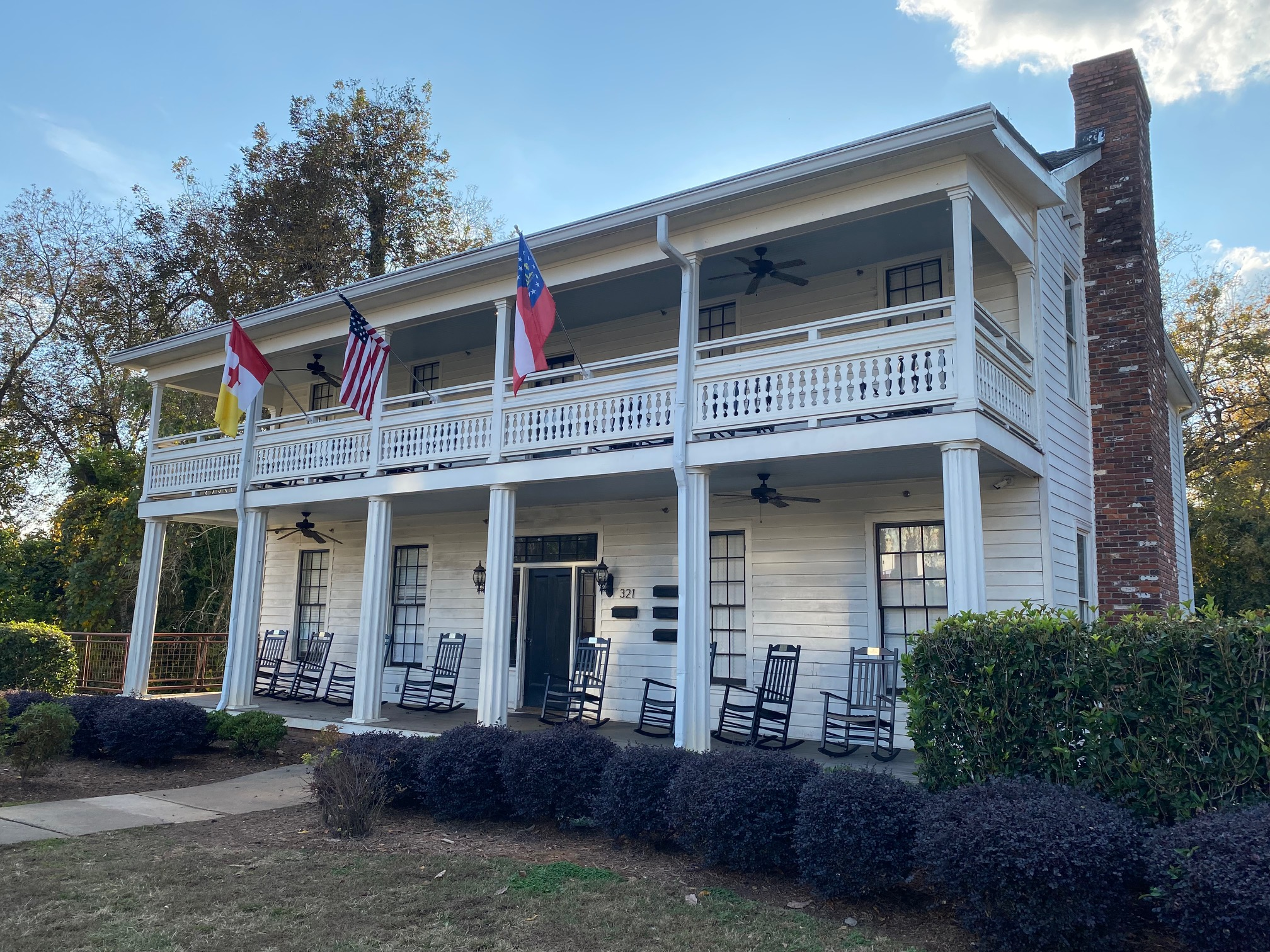
Tomlinson Fort House - 321 S Liberty Street, Milledgeville, Ga 31061

Location of Baldwin County in Georgia

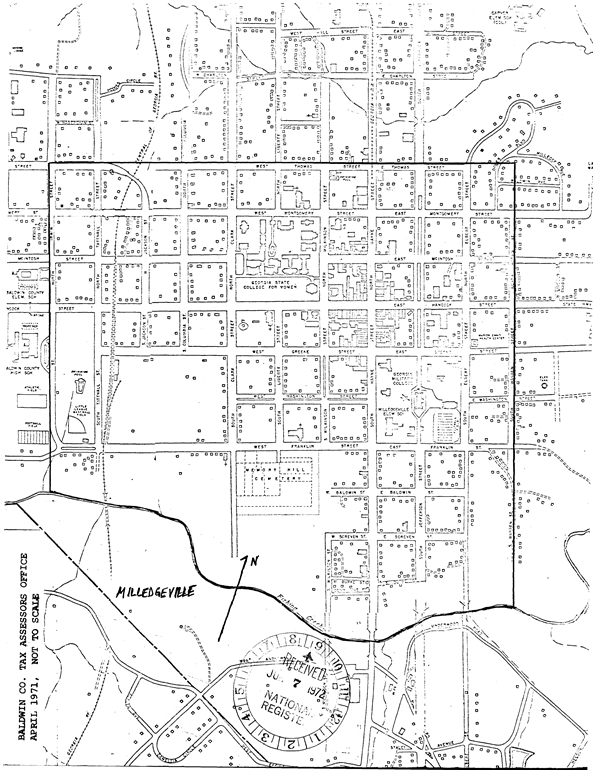
Map of the Milledgeville Historical District, Georgia from NRHP documentation

The Tomlinson Fort House is a historic residence located in Baldwin County, Georgia in the city of Milledgeville. It was built for and was maintained as the primary residence of Tomlinson Fort (congressman) (1787- 1859), upon its completion in 1820. It is a significant site reflecting the life and numerous contributions of its first owner.

Milledgeville served as the State Capital of the State of Georgia from 1804 to 1868. The city planners implemented a grid-based layout similar to Savanah, GA and Washington, DC. The Fort House was originally constructed within an area of many historically significant structures in what is now known as the Milledgeville Historic District. The District is approximately the size of the 3,240 acres (13.1 km^{2}) area laid out in the 1803 plan for the city and was listed on the National Register of Historic Places in 1972.

Being rich in antebellum history, the city played a pivotal role during the Civil War. The nearby Old Governor's Mansion was claimed as a "prize" in General William T. Sherman’s March to the Sea, on November 23, 1864. The State Capital was moved to its current geographical location of Atlanta after the end of the American Civil War (1861-1865).

Within four years after the construction of the house, Tomlinson Fort married Martha Lou Fannin (1804–1883) of nearby Madison, Georgia. Their wedding was held on October 28, 1824. During their marriage Tomlinson and Martha had thirteen children, nine of whom lived to adulthood.

A marker was erected by the Georgia Historical Society at the original homestead location in 1961 to honor Tomlinson Fort as a Union Party leader, a captain in the War of 1812, and a prominent force in both the political and medical histories of the State. Fort attended one year at Philadelphia Medical School in 1809, before settling in Milledgeville to start his medical practice. While serving as a captain in the Baldwin Volunteers in 1812, he was to sustain a wound that would be his eventual cause of death at the age of 72. Mr. Fort was a member of both the Georgia House of Representatives (a Democrat reelected annually: 1818–1826) and the United States House of Representatives (Jacksonian - Twentieth Congress One Term: 1827-1829) from Georgia's 6th Congressional District.

Returning to his medical practice after being a member of both the State and US House of Representatives, Tomlinson Fort helped found the Medical Academy of Augusta in 1928 (with the institution name changing to the Medical College of Georgia after 1933). In 1829 Fort was elected Trustee of University of Georgia in Athens, a position held for 27 years. In July 1930 Tomlinson Fort founded the newspaper "The Federal Union", which was published weekly until 1861. In 1832 he rose to the position of President of the Central Bank of Georgia (later part of State Bank of Georgia), which he held until his death. Fort was an active participant in the group of founders of the Georgia Lunatic Asylum. Work started in 1837 and the facility was opened in1842 in Milledgeville and was later called the Central State Hospital. He ended his political career as Mayor of Milledgeville (1847–1848). Fort was considered to be a public-spirited resident who was also credited with improving the diverse areas of newspapers, learning academies/schools and financial institutions/banks.

In 1849 the Milledgeville office of the newspaper "The Federal Union" published a widely used medical book titled "A dissertation on the practice of medicine: containing an account of the causes, symptoms, and treatment of diseases, and adapted to the use of physicians and families" authored by Tomlinson Fort. A paperback edition of this medical book was published in 2015 by Scholars Choice, followed by a hardcopy edition in 2016 by Wentworth Press. There are currently multiple first edition copies of the book available for sale on-line published as part of the original group from "The Federal Union" stock. On-demand leather bound, hard cover or soft cover copies of the original 1849 book are currently available for printing from on-demand publishers located in the United States, Australia, Canada, Germany, India, Spain and the United Kingdom.

Three of Tomlinson Fort's sons fought in the First and Second Battles of Bull Run (1861&1862). They were part of the 1st, 9th and 28th Georgia Infantry Regiments. Both Civil War battles resulted in Confederate victories.

Under the guidance of Mrs. Fort, the family home became known as the meeting place for the members of the local chapter of the Ladies Relief Society, which was established during the US Civil War. The Relief Society was part of the Women's Organization within the Church of Jesus Christ of Latter-Day Saints, which had begun in 1842 in Illinois.

As the economy of Milledgeville has shifted focus in recent years to emphasize tourism due to the high concentration of preserved historically significant structures, the Tomlinson Fort House has become an instrumental component to these efforts. The residence at its current location at 321 South Liberty Street (relocated in 1985) is featured in the most recent edition of the "Historic Walking Tour Guide - Milledgeville, Georgia". The house is listed as stop 15, as part of the 46 homes, buildings and pieces of property highlighted.

The home was moved to 321 South Liberty Street in 1985 to avoid demolition, when its original location was scheduled for commercial development due to its prime location on a main throughfare.

== Description of structure ==
The Tomlinson Fort House was originally constructed at the NE corner of the intersection of South Liberty Street and West Greene Streets and was completed circa 1820. It was located on the southern half of a lot fronting West Hancock Street, which was to later become one of the main throughfares of the downtown Milledgeville district.

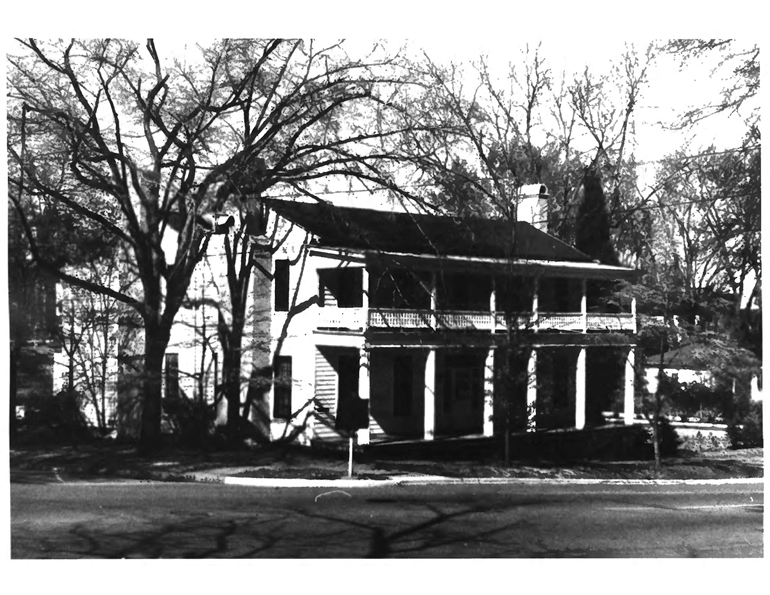
Tomlinson Fort House - West Greene St (original location)

The home was built as a two-story wood-frame house with a set of parallel pitched roofs. Across the front of the building it featured both a full-length porch on the ground level and a second floor balcony. The porch was supported by six fluted Doric inspired columns, while the balcony roof was supported by six smaller columns of the same design. This was an early simplistic adaptation of the Greek architectural style. For much of its life the structure has been painted white. The second floor balcony was later enclosed by a decorative balustrade. As often happened as families grew during that era, the house had been added onto on multiple occasions.

Early photos of the house showed that there were chimneys flanking both stories of the house on both the right and left sides of the building.

== Other community uses - headquarters for Ladies Relief Society ==
In addition to serving as the primary family residence, the Tomlinson Fort House served as the headquarters for the "Ladies Relief Society", when a chapter was established in Milledgeville by Martha Fort.

The local chapter of the Society was reported to have played a significant role in the community's history, particularly during the Civil War. The society raised funds and provided care for wounded soldiers. It demonstrated the vital contributions of women in medical and humanitarian efforts. The women who were part of the group worked to support their fellow citizens during a time of great need. Mirroring activities of Society Chapters in other geographic location, Mrs. Fort was reported to have also opened her living room to her female friends and neighbors to sew uniforms and knit socks for the troops.

As noted above, three of Martha and Tomlinson Fort's sons were to serve during the Civil War as volunteers with the Confederate Army.

== Historic marker ==
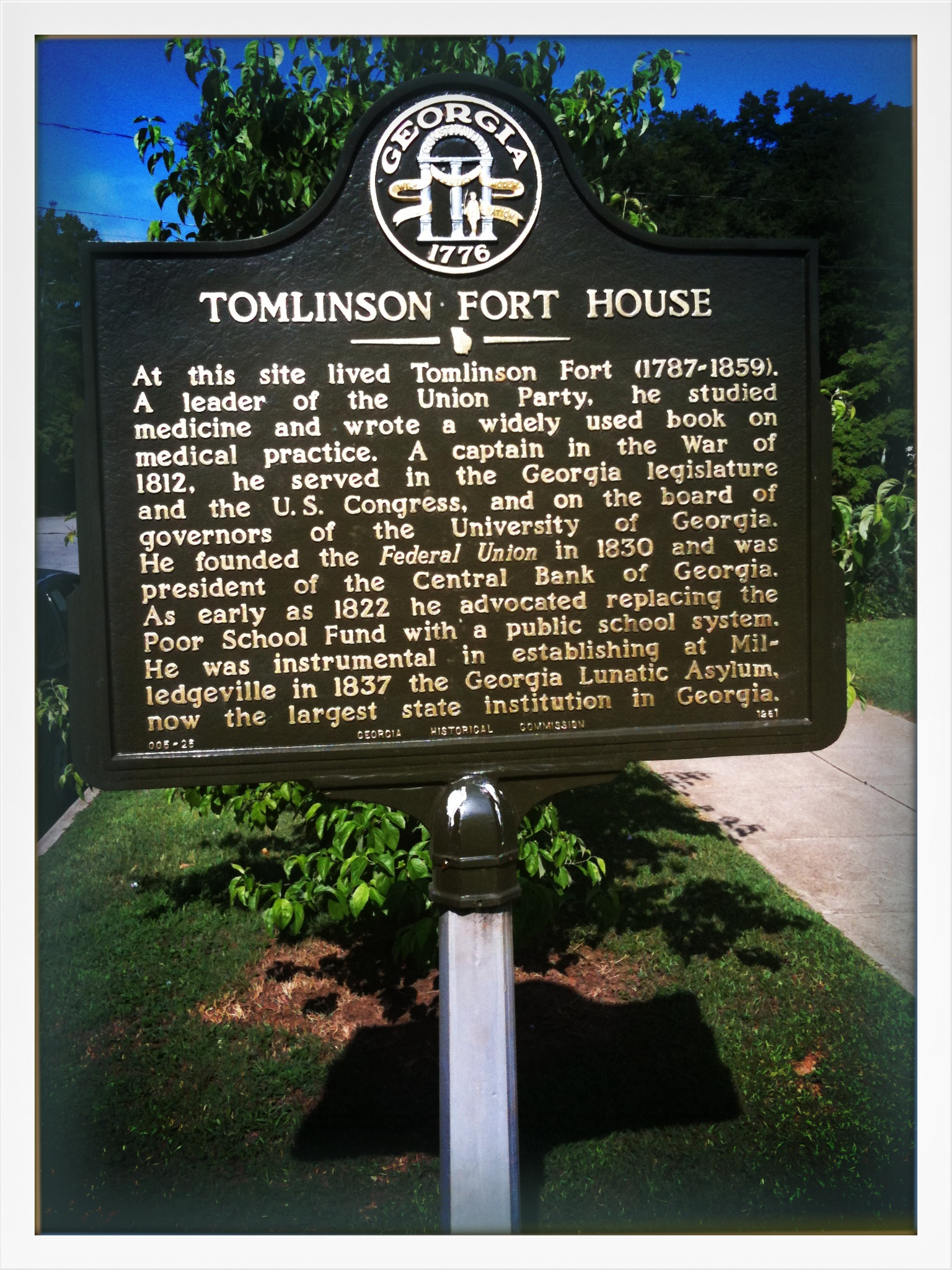
- GHS Historical Marker

A historic marker for the house was erected at the original location of the structure in 1961 by the Georgia Historical Society.

The Historical Marker Number is 005–25. The physical location of the marker was 33° 4.76′ N, 83° 13.783′ W. It was located at the intersection of West Greene Street and South Liberty Street, on the right when traveling west on West Greene.

The State Historical Marker at the house read: "At this site lived Tomlinson Fort (1787-1859). A leader of the Union Party, he studied medicine and wrote a widely used book on medical practice. A captain in the War of 1812, he served in the Georgia legislature and the U.S. Congress, and on the board of governors of the University of Georgia. He founded the Federal Union in 1830 and was president of the Central Bank of Georgia. As early as 1822 he advocated replacing the Poor School Fund with a public school system. He was instrumental in establishing at Milledgeville in 1837 the Georgia Lunatic Asylum, now the largest state institution in Georgia."

Although for a period of time the Historical Society had stated that the marker was no longer visible on site due to damage or maintenance, a refurbished version has been erected in 2026.

== Relocation of the structure in 1985 ==
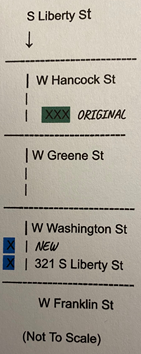
Tomlinson Fort House Relocation

The Fort House was originally built on a piece of land whose zoning use changed from residential (1820–1902) to 1/2 commercial & 1/2 residential (1903–1984), to fully commercial (1985) over time. The north half of the lot fronted West Hancock Street, which eventually became the main east–west commercial throughfare through the historic district. By 1903 the property contained a bank building, in addition to the existing residence (south half of lot fronting West Green St.) when the Exchange Bank was founded. The bank property eventually evolved into an entire block fronting at 250 West Hancock St (SE corner of South Liberty Street and West Hancock Street). The Tomlinson Fort House was scheduled to be torn down for the expansion of the bank's drive-through and adjacent parking facilities in the early 1980s. However, the house was saved from demolition and moved to a different location in the Milledgeville Historic District in 1985 because of its historic significance.

The structure is now located at 321 South Liberty Street (west side of street), with West Washington Street to the North and West Franklin Street to the South. This is approximately two full blocks down South Liberty St and on the other side of the street from the original site. It can be found across from the First Baptist Church complex, with a 330 South Liberty Street address (east side of street).

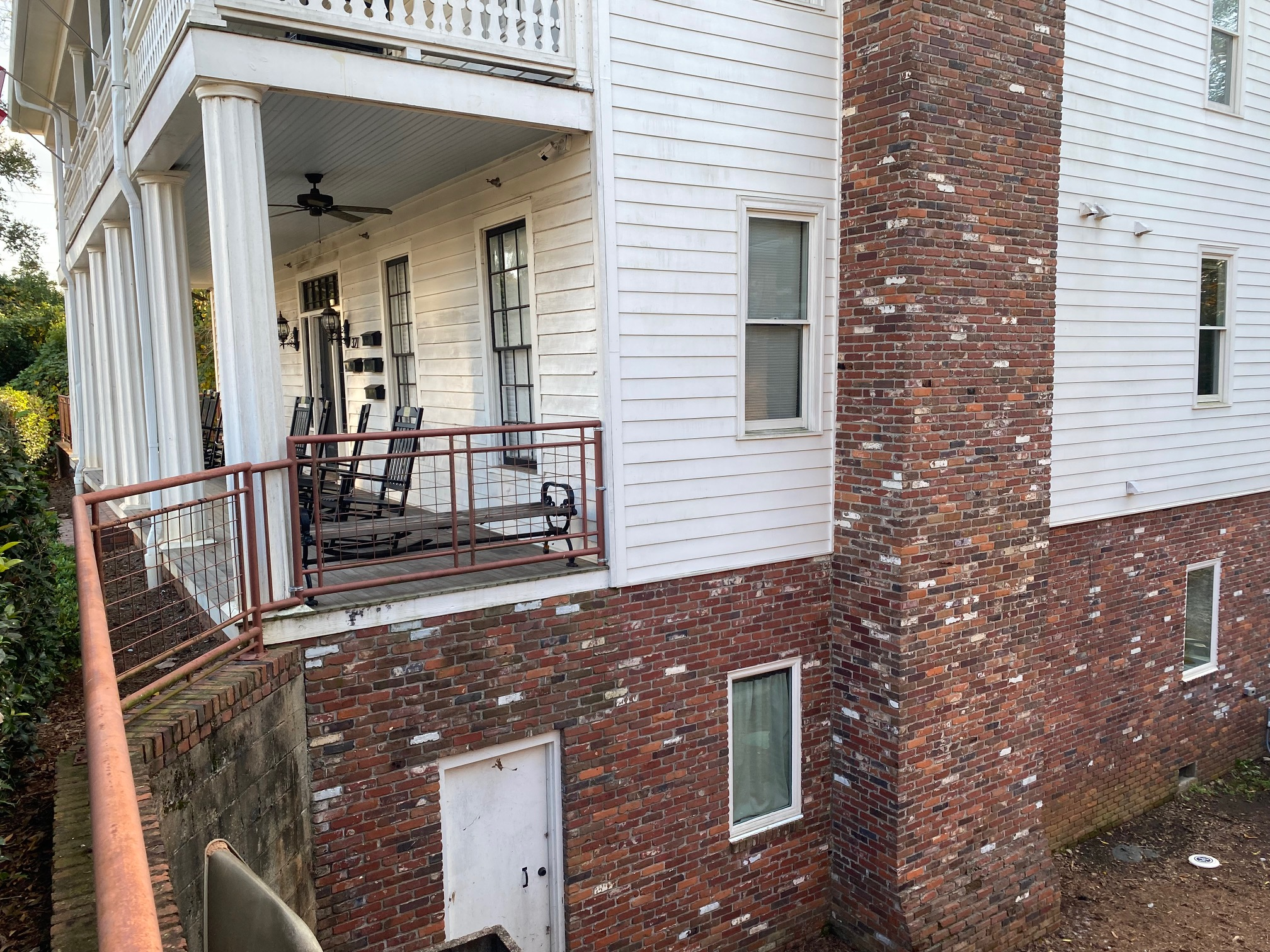
New brick foundation and chimney added as part of move

A brick foundation had been built at the new site prior to the arrival of the structure. Once the structure was settled onto its new foundation, a new chimney was built on the right side to go up all three levels. The chimney which was originally located on the left side of the building, was not rebuilt in the new location. The building is now three stories, with the lower level accessible from the parking lot to the rear of the lot.

The historical marker was not relocated when the physical structure was moved to its current location.

== Also view ==
- Fort, Tomlinson - (1849) A dissertation on the practice of medicine : containing an account of the causes, symptoms, and treatment of diseases, and adapted to the use of physicians and families. Digitized 1849 Book - The Library of Congress
- Fort, Kate Haynes - (1903) Memoirs of the Fort and Fannin Families. Digitized 1903 Book - Internet Archive
