= Devereux-Coleman House =

Historic house in Georgia, United States

- Devereux--Coleman House
- U.S. National Register of Historic Places
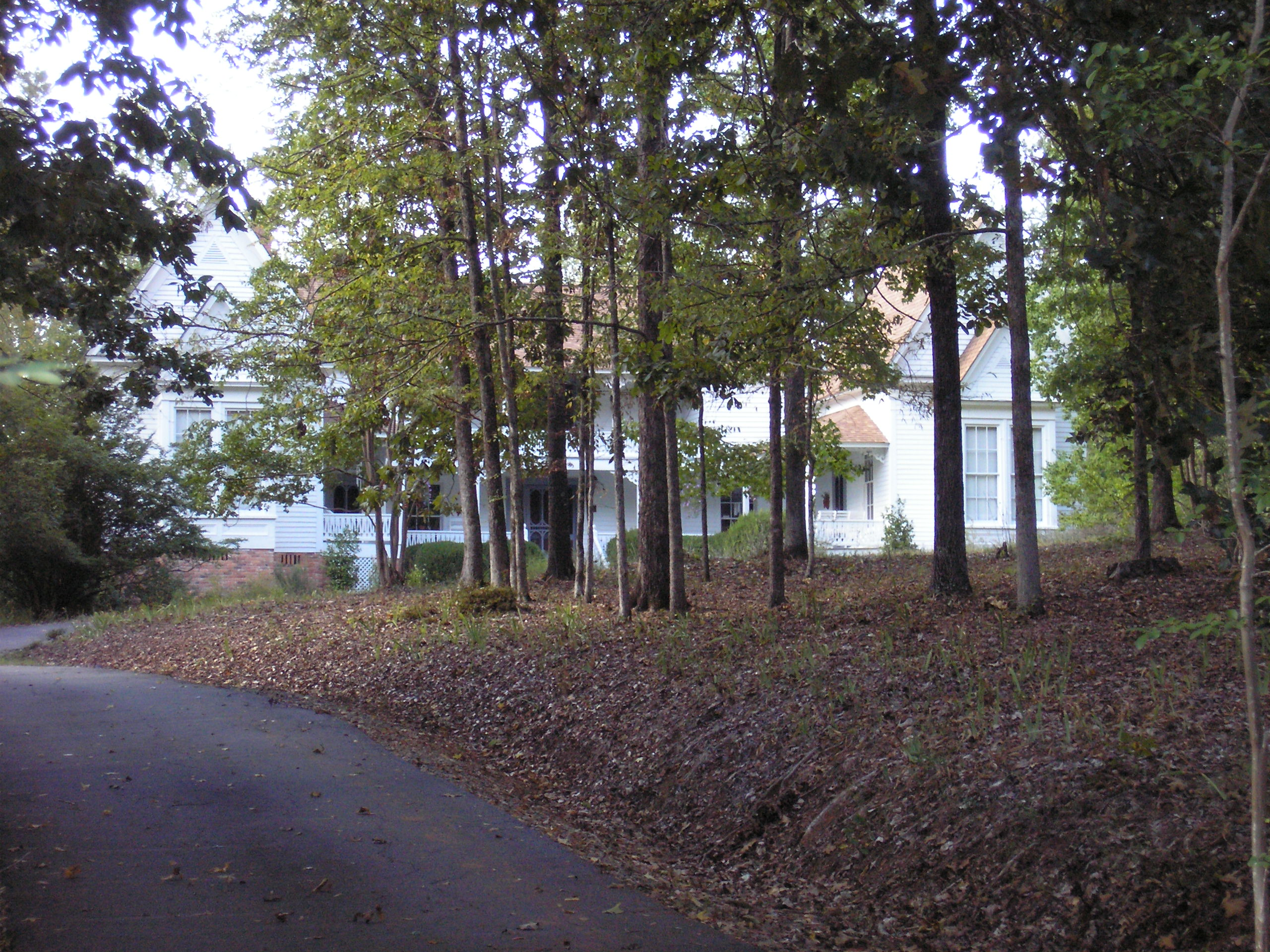
- House is visible through the trees, kind of

- Location within Georgia Location within the United States
- Location: 167 Kenan Dr., Milledgeville, Georgia
- Coordinates: 33.1469°N 83.2833°W
- Area: 1 acre (0.40 ha)
- Built: 1834, 1840, 1887
- Architectural style: I-house, Folk Victorian
- NRHP reference No.: 93000214
- Added to NRHP: April 8, 1993

The Devereux-Coleman House, also known as the Coleman-Hogan House, in Milledgeville in Baldwin County, Georgia, was listed on the National Register of Historic Places in 1993.

== Description and history ==
It is a two-story, wood-framed I-House with wings that make a U-shape, all connected by a front porch. It was built in 1834 as a one-story central hallway-plan house, and the second floor was added in 1840. The wings and connecting front porch were built in 1887. It has Folk Victorian details.

The entire house was moved about 20 miles to its current location in 1981, from its original rural location in Hancock County.
