= Old Capitol Building =

Old Capitol Building can refer to:

- Iowa Old Capitol Building
- Old Capitol Building (Olympia, Washington)
- Old State Capitol (Milledgeville, Georgia)
- Old State Capitol State Historic Site
