= Thalian Hall (Georgia) =

- U.S. National Register of Historic Places
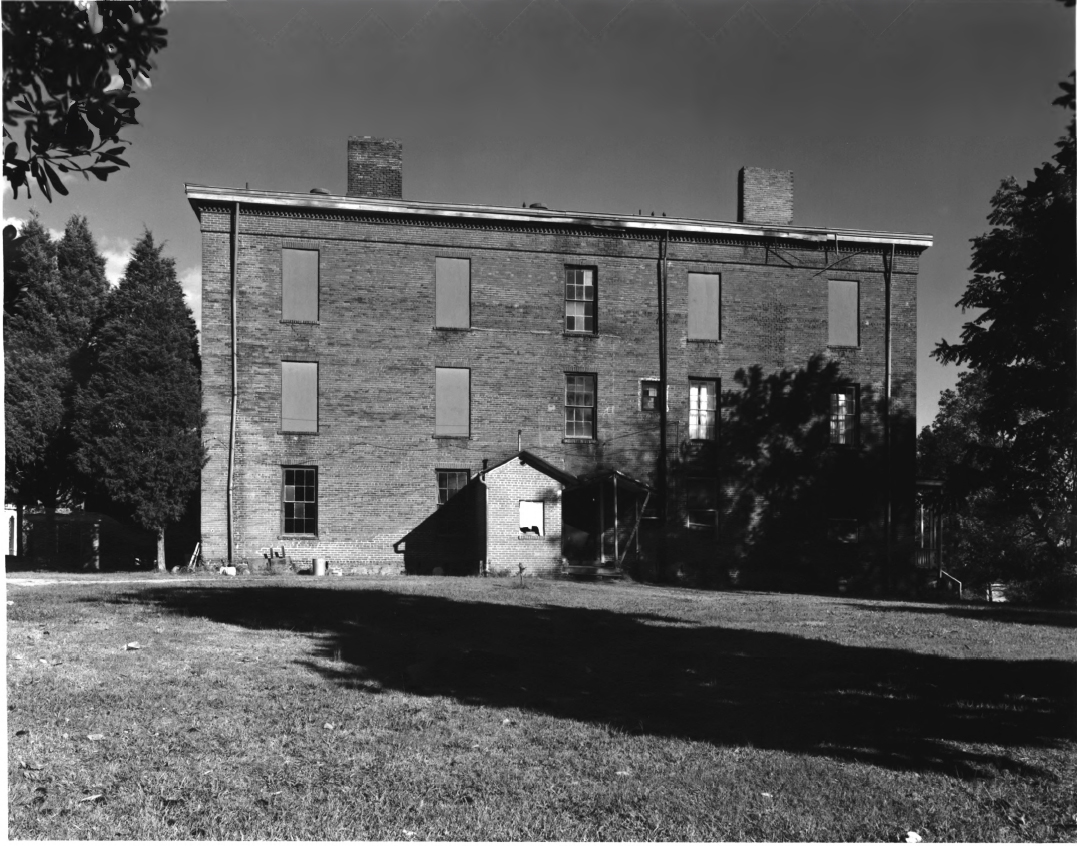
- Thalian Hall in 1976

- Location within Georgia Location within the United States
- Nearest city: Milledgeville, Georgia
- Coordinates: 33°3′19″N 83°14′43″W
- Area: 3 acres (1.2 ha)
- Built: 1859-1860
- Built by: Lane, Joseph, Jr.
- NRHP reference No.: 78000964
- Added to NRHP: March 21, 1978

Thalian Hall was a historic building in Milledgeville, Georgia, U.S. It was added to the National Register of Historic Places in 1978.

== History ==
The three-story building was built by Joseph Lane Jr. in 1860. The building was home to the Thalian Society, a literary society at Oglethorpe University, who used it as a dorm. Poet Sidney Lanier lived in this dorm as a student. The building was demolished in 1990.
