= Old State Capitol (Milledgeville, Georgia) =

Historic state capitol in Georgia, US

- U.S. National Register of Historic Places
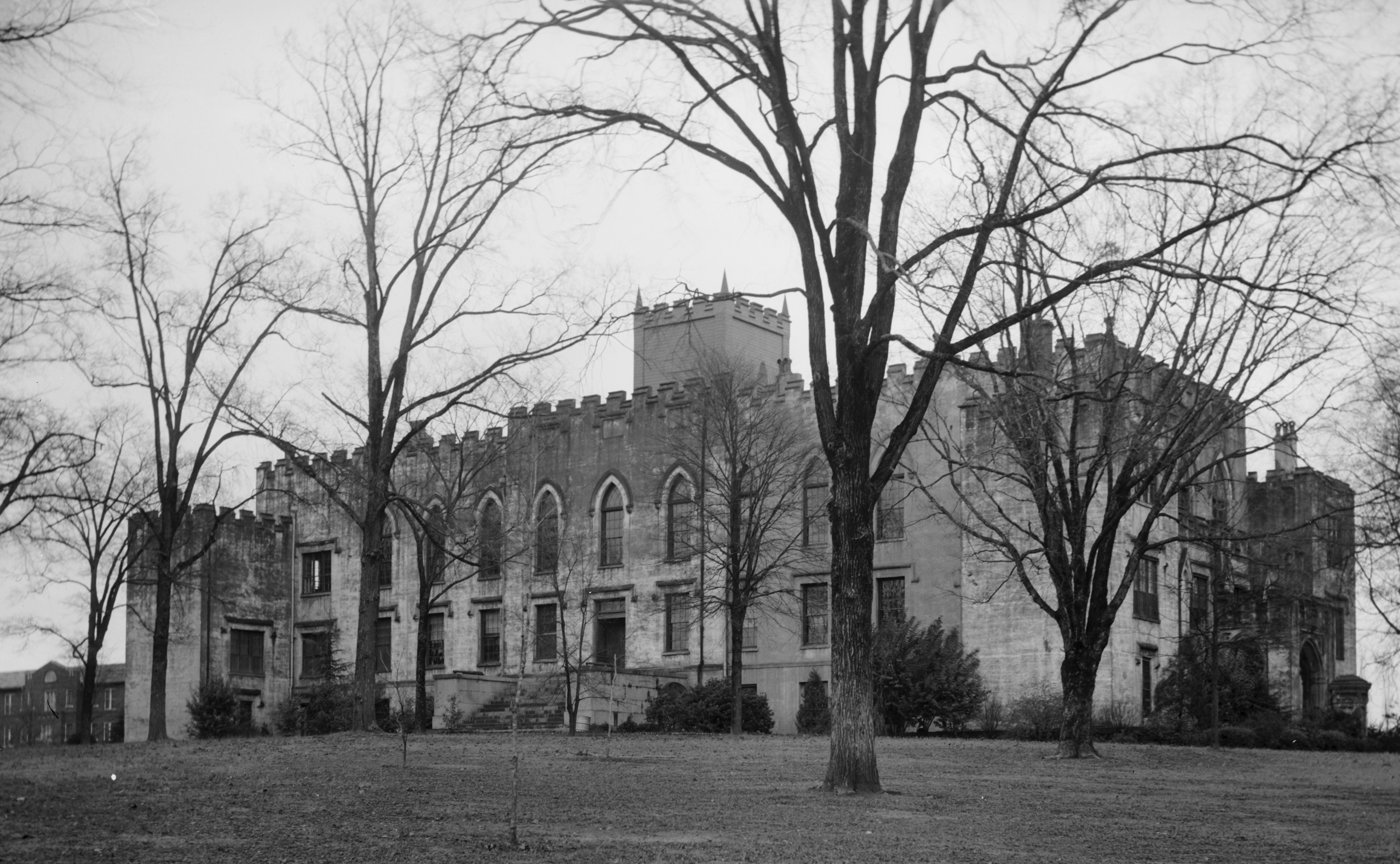
- Old Georgia State Capitol, photograph by L. D. Andrew for the Historic American Buildings Survey

- Location within Georgia Location within the United States
- Location: Greene St., Milledgeville, Georgia
- Coordinates: 33.07770°N 83.22547°W
- Area: 5 acres (2.0 ha)
- Built: 1807
- Built by: Gen. Jett Thomas, Joseph Lane
- Architectural style: Gothic Revival
- NRHP reference No.: 70000195
- Added to NRHP: May 13, 1970

The Old State Capitol is located in Milledgeville, Georgia. It was added to the National Register of Historic Places on May 13, 1970. It is located on Greene Street. Georgia's original state capitol was in Louisville, Georgia. On December 12, 1804, the state legislature voted to designate Milledgeville as the capital of Georgia. In 1805, $60,000 was appropriated to build a capitol building; and a planned city with elements of Savannah, Georgia, and Washington D.C., was proposed, for centrally located Milledgeville. Jett Thomas and John B. Scott were the general contractors for the construction work.

The Georgia Legislature met in the yet-to-be-completed building for the first time in 1807. The Marquis de Lafayette visited the building in 1825 while on his tour through the United States. Expansions were completed to north and south wings in 1828 and 1834, respectively. East and west porticoes with granite steps were added in 1835.

Georgia's Secession Convention in 1861 was held in the building, and a vote for secession carried on January 19, 1861. Governor Joe Brown worked from the building, conducting the affairs of the state militia and engaging in disputes with C.S.A. President Jefferson Davis from the capitol and the nearby Governor's Mansion.

Brown and others fled the capitol ahead of the arrival of General William Tecumseh Sherman's Union Army. They occupied the city of Milledgeville on November 23, 1864. The Old Capitol building was damaged, while armories and magazines on Statehouse Square were destroyed. In 1868, during Reconstruction, the legislature moved the capital to Atlanta, a city emerging as the symbol of the New South as opposed to Milledgeville, seen as being connected to the Old South.

The statehouse was used as the court house for Baldwin County, Georgia from 1871 - 1879. Then it was used for the Middle Georgia Military and Agricultural College, which became Georgia Military College in 1900. The building remains the center of the college campus and is open for tours.

== See also ==
- National Register of Historic Places listings in Baldwin County, Georgia
