= Samuel Rockwell House =

Historic house in Georgia, United States

- U.S. National Register of Historic Places
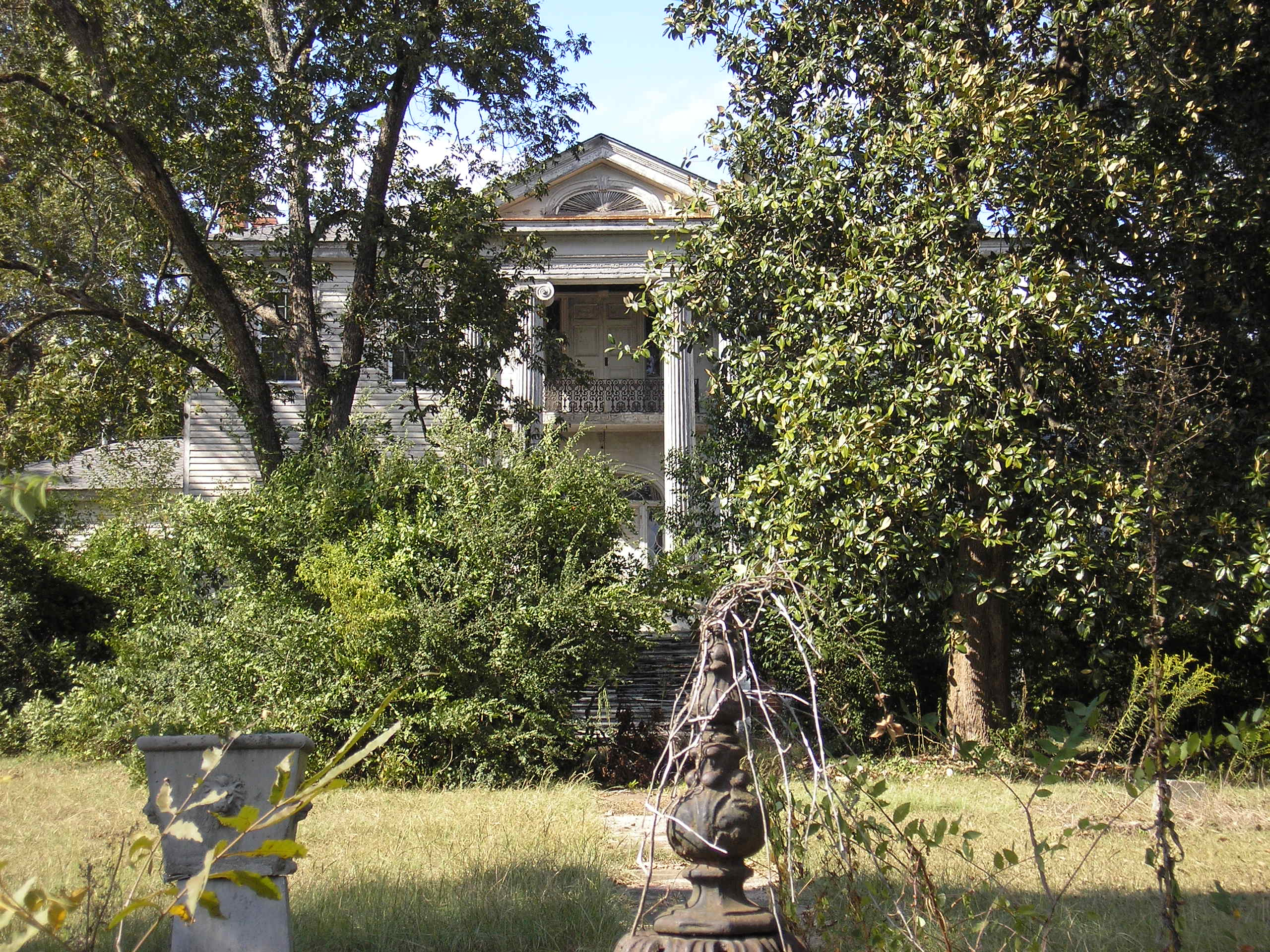
- Samuel Rockwell House (2016)

- Location within Georgia Location within the United States
- Location: 165 Allen Memorial Drive; Milledgeville, Georgia
- Coordinates: 33°3′15.12″N 83°16′6.168″W
- Built: 1838
- Architect: Joseph Lane
- Architectural style: Federal, Greek Revival
- Website: RockwellHouseGA.com
- NRHP reference No.: 78000961
- Added to NRHP: April 19, 1978

The Samuel Rockwell House is a historic house in Milledgeville, Georgia. Built in 1838, the building was at one point the summer house of Georgia Governor Herschel Vespasian Johnson. The building was damaged by a fire in 1969 and was added to the National Register of Historic Places in 1978.

== History ==
Located in what was at the time the capital city of Georgia, the building was built in 1838 for Colonel Samuel Rockwell of the Georgia Militia. Rockwell, a slaveholder, had previously lived in Maine before moving to Georgia in 1834, and before moving to Milledgeville to practice law, he served as an attorney in Savannah. The architect behind the building's construction was Joseph Lane, who had traveled with Rockwell from Maine to design the building. Rockwell would later serve on the committee that built what is now Central State Hospital in Milledgeville, while Lane would go on to design several buildings on the campus of Oglethorpe University. The building was constructed at a cost of approximately $2,500, while the cast iron fence surrounding the property reportedly cost about $2,600. An urban legend claims Rockwell suffered a heart attack after hearing how much the fence had cost.

Rockwell died at the property in 1841. Following this, the house passed through several owners, and at one time served as the summer house for Herschel Vespasian Johnson, who would later become Governor of Georgia. Following Johnson's death in 1880, the house again passed through several owners. The building was sold again in 1967 to an owner who began renovating the historic building, but in 1969 the building was damaged by a fire caused by a blowtorch used in the renovation process. Following this, the house had been the subject of a renovation project since 1971. On April 19, 1978, the building was added to the National Register of Historic Places. In 2019, the building was sold to 3 investors, including an Atlanta-based realtor who specializes in historic preservation. The house has since undergone a renovation and was open to the public for hosting events or renting rooms for nightly stays. The house is now a private home.

== Architecture ==
The building is an example of Federal architecture, with the columns and pediment showing elements of Greek Revival architecture. The building consists of eight rooms spread over two floors, as well as two foyers on each floor, with a spiral staircase connecting the floors. The building was constructed using a "notch and peg" method, with the only use of nails being in the external weatherboarding. The exterior was originally painted light yellow, with Charleston green shutters. The property includes a carriage house and slave quarters in the rear.

== See also ==
- National Register of Historic Places listings in Baldwin County, Georgia
