= Meriwether, Georgia =

- Unincorporated community
- Location within the state of Georgia Meriwether, Georgia (the United States)
- Coordinates: 33°09′18″N 83°19′09″W
- Country: United States
- State: Georgia
- County: Baldwin
- Elevation: 361 ft (110 m)
- Time zone: UTC-5 (Eastern (EST))
  - Summer (DST): UTC-4 (EDT)
- Area code: 478
- GNIS ID: 326395

Meriwether (also Meriweather, Meriwether Station) is an unincorporated community in Baldwin County, Georgia, United States.

It is the location of Westbrook-Hubert Farm, which is listed on the U.S. National Register of Historic Places.
