= Atkinson Hall, Georgia College =

- U.S. National Register of Historic Places
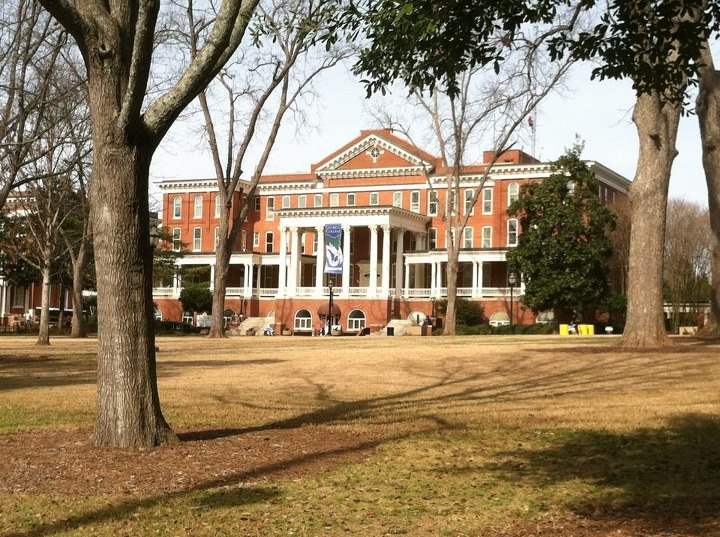

- Location within Georgia Location within the United States
- Location: Georgia College campus, Milledgeville, Georgia
- Coordinates: 33°04′54″N 83°13′51″W
- Area: less than one acre
- Built: 1896
- Architect: Bruce & Morgan
- Architectural style: Classical Revival
- NRHP reference No.: 72000359
- Added to NRHP: January 20, 1972

Atkinson Hall is a historic building at Georgia College in Milledgeville, Georgia. Atkinson Hall was constructed in 1896. It was saved from demolition in 1978 by alumni, community support, faculty, and students. The building was home to the college's J. Whitney Bunting College of Business and is named for William Y. Atkinson and his wife, Susan Cobb Milton Atkinson. Susan Atkinson was involved in advancing women's education after communicating with her journalist friend, Julia Flisch. Atkinson persuaded her husband, a state legislator from Meriwether County, Georgia (and future governor), to create legislation establishing Georgia Normal & Industrial College in 1889. The building was added to the National Register of Historic Places on January 20, 1972.

== See also ==
- National Register of Historic Places listings in Baldwin County, Georgia
