= Old Governor's Mansion (Milledgeville, Georgia) =

Historic governor's mansion in Georgia, US

- Georgia's Old Governor's Mansion
- U.S. National Register of Historic Places
- U.S. National Historic Landmark
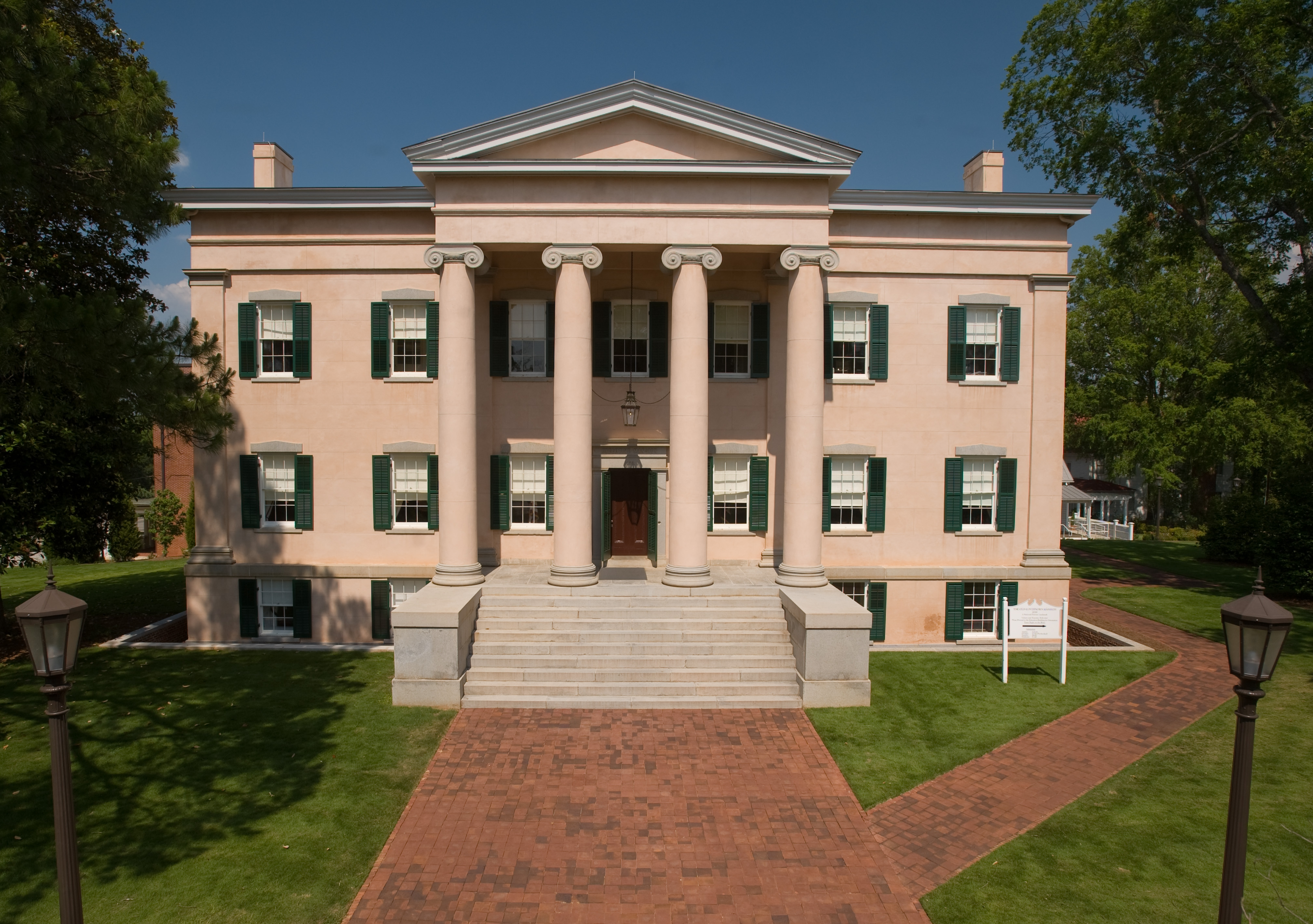

- Location within Georgia Location within the United States
- Location: 120 S. Clark St., Milledgeville, Georgia
- Coordinates: 33.07864°N 83.23131°W
- Built: 1839
- Architect: Charles B. Cluskey
- Architectural style: Greek Revival
- NRHP reference No.: 70000194

Significant dates
- Added to NRHP: May 13, 1970
- Designated NHL: November 7, 1973

Georgia's Old Governor's Mansion is a historic house museum located on the campus of Georgia College & State University (GCSU) at 120 South Clarke Street in Milledgeville, Georgia. Built in 1839, it is one of the finest examples of Greek Revival architecture in the American South, and was designated a National Historic Landmark for its architecture in 1973. It served as Georgia's executive mansion from 1839- 1868, and has from 1889 been a university property, serving for a time as its official president's residence. It is an accredited museum of the American Alliance of Museums and in 2015 was named an affiliate of the Smithsonian Institution.

== Description and history ==
Georgia's Old Governor's Mansion is located in central Milledgeville, just south of the central campus of Georgia College at the corner of Clarke and Greene Streets. It is set on a manicured parcel, its street-facing sides lined by a brick retaining wall topped by a low white fence. The main house is rectangular, two stories in height, built of stuccoed brick with a hip roof capped by a small circular cupola. The main facade faces west toward Clarke Street, and has a four-columned Greek temple portico projecting at its center. The portico is supported by smooth Ionic brick columns with granite bases and capitals, and it supports an entablature and fully pedimented gable. The entablature is continued around the sides of the building, with pilastered corners. Windows have simple stone sills, and arched stone lintels.

The mansion was built in 1839 to a design by Charles B. Cluskey, and is considered to be one of his finest works. It was the first of Georgia's three official mansions and one unofficial mansion, located in two different cities. It was home to eight governor's and their families from 1839 – 1868. Governor Joseph E Brown led Georgia through the Civil War while living in the Mansion. During the Civil War, the Mansion was claimed as a "prize" during General Sherman's "March to the Sea" and Sherman made the Mansion his headquarters, spending the night of November 23, 1864 in the Mansion's family dining room.

Following the loss of the capital, The Mansion was used as a boarding house until from 1868 - 1879, when the state loaned it to the newly organized Georgia Military and Agricultural College, and then to Georgia Normal and Industrial College, now Georgia College. The mansion served as the latter school's first dormitory, with the presidential apartment on the second floor. The school began offering tours of the ground floor in 1967.

In the early 2000s the college had the building restored to its c. 1851 appearance during a $9.5 million restoration, and opened it as a historic house museum devoted to the history of the building and its many occupants. Today, the Mansion is open to the public for tours that focus on the history of the building, its occupants both free and enslaved, and the myriad complexities of Antebellum society in Georgia and its history. Georgia's Old Governor's Mansion's mission statement is "to care for, collect, interpret and exhibit items (including artifacts, structures, and gardens) that illustrate the history of the site and its inhabitants during the years the Mansion was the official residence of Georgia's governors (1839–1868)."

Georgia's Old Governor's Mansion is open to the public Tuesdays–Saturdays 10am to 4pm and Sundays 2pm to 4pm with tours on the top of every hour and the last tour of the day at 4pm.

== See also ==
- Atkinson Hall, Georgia College
- National Register of Historic Places listings in Baldwin County, Georgia
