= Milledgeville, Georgia =

- City
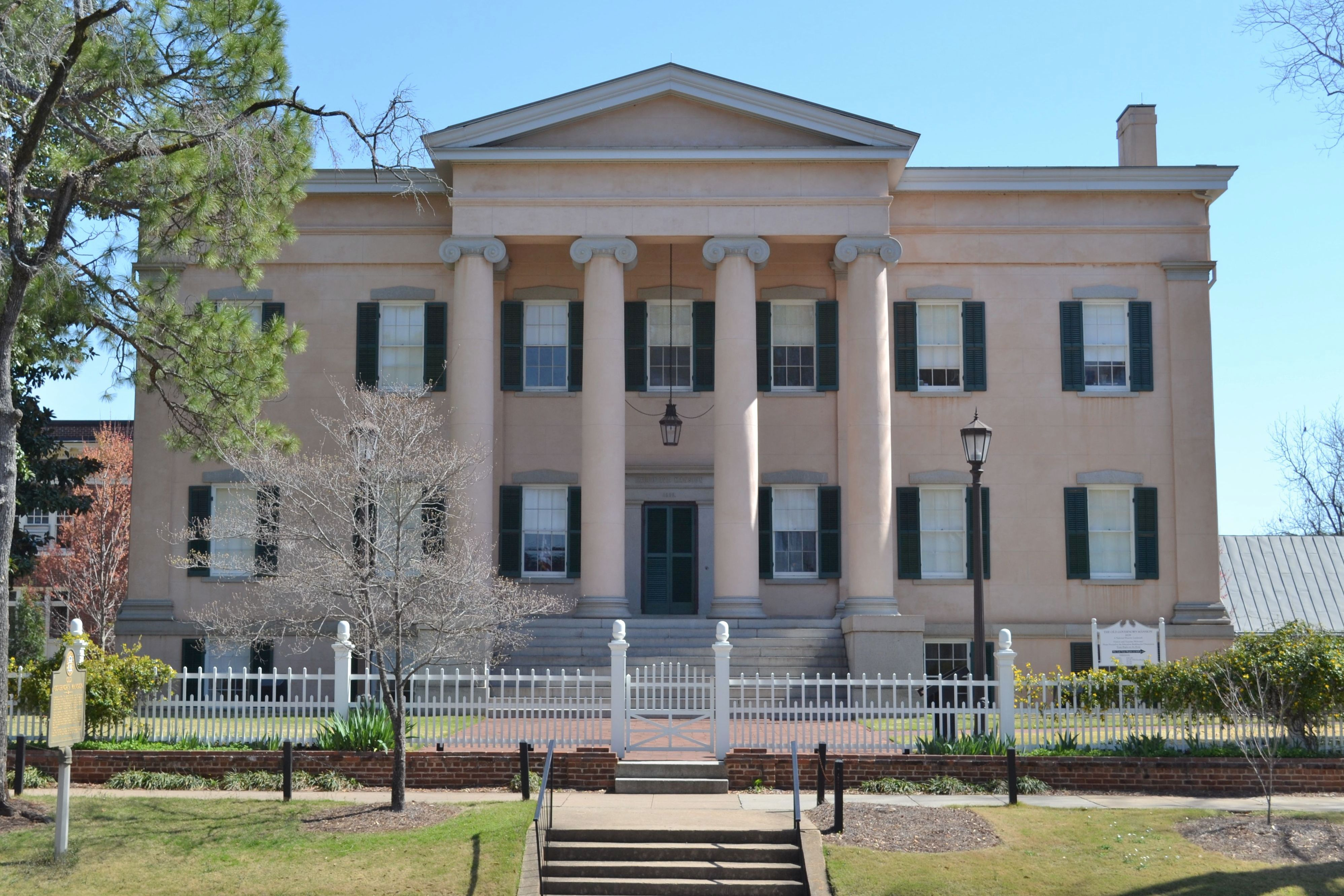
- Old Governor's House

- Flag Seal
- Motto(s): "Capitols, Columns and Culture"
- Location in Baldwin County and the state of Georgia

- Location of Milledgeville in the US
- Coordinates: 33°5′16″N 83°14′0″W
- Country: United States
- State: Georgia
- County: Baldwin
- Incorporated: December 12, 1804; 221 years ago
- Named for: John Milledge

Government
  - Type: Council–Manager
  - Mayor: Mary Parham-Copelan
  - Manager: Hank Griffeth
  - Council: Members: Dr. Collinda Lee; Jeanette Walden; Denese Shinholster; Walter Reynolds; Shonya A. Mapp; Steve Chamber – Council President Pro Tem

Area
  - Total: 20.42 sq mi (52.89 km^{2})
  - Land: 20.26 sq mi (52.47 km^{2})
  - Water: 0.161 sq mi (0.416 km^{2})
- Elevation: 330 ft (100 m)

Population (2020)
  - Total: 17,070
  - Density: 840.0/sq mi (324.31/km^{2})
- Time zone: UTC−5 (Eastern Time)
  - Summer (DST): UTC−4 (EDT)
- ZIP Code: 31061
- Area code: 478
- FIPS code: 13-51492
- GNIS feature ID: 0332390
- Website: milledgevillega.us

Milledgeville (/ˈmɪlɪdʒˌvɪl/) is a city in and the county seat of Baldwin County, Georgia, United States. Founded in 1803 along the Oconee River, it served as the state capital of Georgia from 1804 to 1868, including during the American Civil War. The city's layout—modeled after the grid plans of Savannah, Georgia, and Washington, D.C.—reflects Milledgeville's intended role as a seat of government. During its years as the capital, Milledgeville quickly became a hub of political activity and cotton-based commerce before facing significant economic changes after the capital was relocated to Atlanta in 1868.

Today, Milledgeville lies along the Fall Line Freeway, a major east-west corridor that connects Milledgeville with historically significant cities like Augusta, Macon, and Columbus. Its historic core, including the Old State Capitol, is preserved within the Milledgeville Historic District in downtown Milledgeville.

Milledgeville is home to a public school district, private K-12 schools, and three colleges: Georgia College & State University, Georgia Military College, and Central Georgia Technical College. Other key sectors include healthcare, retail trade, and public administration. Tourism also supports the local economy, with visitors drawn to features like the city's historic architecture, Lake Sinclair, and Andalusia, the former home of author Flannery O'Connor.

Milledgeville is the principal city of the Milledgeville micropolitan area, which had a population of 43,799 as of the 2020 United States census. The city itself had a population of 17,070. In recent years, local leaders have prioritized economic diversification and downtown revitalization as part of broader efforts to support growth and attract investment.

== History ==
Milledgeville served as Georgia's state capital from 1804 to 1868 and played a central role in shaping the state's early development. Established during a period of territorial expansion following treaties with the Muscogee (Creek) Nation, the city became the state's center of political activity and remained so through the American Civil War, after which the capital was relocated to Atlanta. In the decades that followed, Milledgeville responded to the challenges of losing its capital status by expanding public institutions and higher education and, more recently, by investing in economic diversification and downtown revitalization.

Milledgeville, named for Georgia governor John Milledge (1802–1806), was established in 1804 as Georgia's new centrally located capital. Its founding followed the 1802 Treaty of Fort Wilkinson, through which the Muscogee (Creek) Nation ceded land west of the Oconee River to the state. Prior to this, the area had been the subject of prolonged conflict between settlers and the Creek Nation, including violent clashes known as the Oconee War. Planned as a grid-based city similar to Savannah, Georgia, and Washington, D.C., Milledgeville quickly rose in prominence, serving as Georgia's capital for over six decades until 1868.

As Georgia's capital, Milledgeville grew into a hub of political activity and cotton-based commerce in the decades leading up to the American Civil War. The city's economic expansion was built in part by slave labor, including those who worked on plantations and within the town as domestic workers, skilled tradespeople, and general laborers. By 1828, nearly half of Milledgeville's 1,599 residents were slaves; with only 27 free Black residents.

Milledgeville continued to expand with the addition of major state institutions, including a penitentiary and the Georgia State Lunatic, Idiot, and Epileptic Asylum (now Central State Hospital). Taverns, hotels, shops, banks, and newspapers also emerged during this period, and in 1838, Oglethorpe University was founded as one of Georgia's earliest chartered colleges. As Milledgeville developed, its appearance began to shift from a frontier town to a more established capital with larger, more refined buildings. Among these were a new statehouse (now known as the Old State Capitol) and an Executive Mansion (now referred to as the Old Governor's Mansion).

By the late 1850s, tensions over slavery and states' rights culminated in political crisis. Following the election of Abraham Lincoln in 1860, a secession convention was held on January 16, 1861, with approximately 300 voting delegates in attendance. On January 19, the convention adopted the Ordinance of Secession by a vote of 208 to 80, making Georgia the fifth state to secede from the Union. Shortly afterward, Georgia joined South Carolina, Mississippi, Florida, Alabama, and Louisiana to form the Confederate States of America. During the American Civil War, Milledgeville contributed troops and supplies to the Confederate cause, but the community endured several hardships including inflation, shortages, and one of several regional food riots.

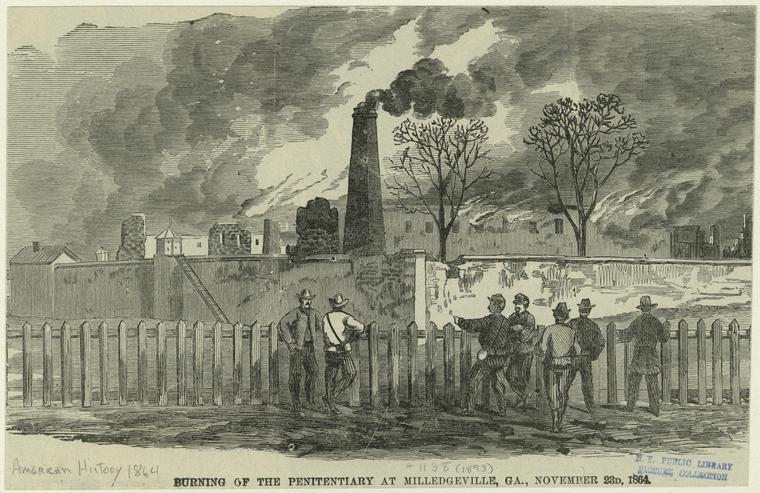
Burning of the penitentiary at Milledgeville. Confederates used the penitentiary as an armory.

In November 1864, during the American Civil War campaign known as the March to the Sea, Union General William T. Sherman and 30,000 troops entered Milledgeville. The campaign, which began in Atlanta and ended in Savannah, aimed to weaken the Confederacy by destroying infrastructure, supply lines, and civilian morale. Although Milledgeville avoided widespread destruction, several military sites were damaged, grain and livestock were seized, and homes were looted. After the war's conclusion in 1865, Milledgeville faced major economic disruption. Confederate currency became worthless, infrastructure was damaged, and many citizens bartered for basic goods amid widespread poverty.

In 1868, the Georgia General Assembly moved the state capital to Atlanta, which was emerging as a transportation and commercial hub. The relocation marked a significant shift in political and economic power, leading to a decline in population that slowed Milledgeville's recovery. Recovery efforts during the Reconstruction era focused on restoring the asylum and penitentiary, while many farmers switched to the crop-lien system—a practice that often trapped them in cycles of debt. In the following decades, the founding of Middle Georgia Military and Agricultural College (now Georgia Military College) on the former state capitol site in 1879, and Georgia Normal and Industrial College (now Georgia College & State University) on the former penitentiary grounds in 1889, contributed to the city's revitalization. The continued operation of the asylum—renamed Georgia State Sanitarium in 1897—alongside these institutions helped sustain Milledgeville's recovery into the twentieth century.

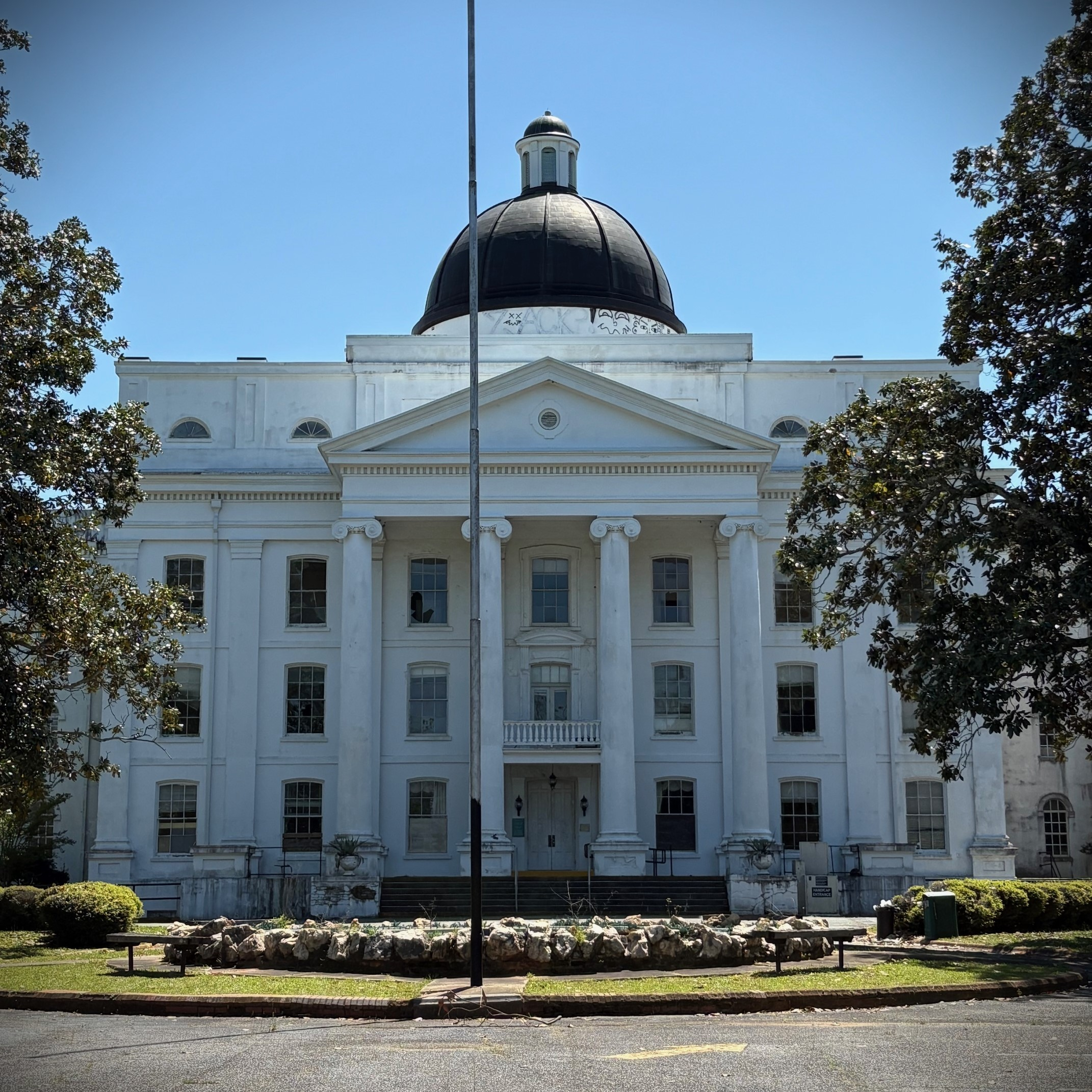
The Powell Building was the main building of the Georgia Lunatic Asylum (now Central State Hospital) when it opened in 1842. Photo taken April 2025.

The early 20th century brought additional challenges and change. Milledgeville's agricultural economy was disrupted by the boll weevil infestation, which devastated cotton crops across Georgia, pushing many farmers to diversify their crops or seek employment outside agriculture. Central State Hospital, as the former asylum came to be known, grew into one of the largest mental health institutions in the United States, housing over 12,000 patients by the 1960s. While its scale and mission were once seen as progressive, the hospital also became the subject of criticism over time, particularly related to overcrowding, inadequate treatment, and patient mistreatment—issues that reflected broader shortcomings in institutional mental health care across the U.S. The national movement toward deinstitutionalization and the rise of community-based mental health services later led to a steady decline in the hospital's operations and workforce.

Economic diversification efforts gained momentum mid-century. The formation of Lake Sinclair in 1953 by the Georgia Power Company spurred recreational tourism, and subsequent historic preservation projects in the 1980s and 1990s revitalized downtown Milledgeville. Recognition of the city's antebellum heritage, combined with community development initiatives like the Main Street Program, boosted heritage tourism and strengthened Milledgeville's cultural identity.

In the 21st century, local leaders have continued to diversify and strengthen Milledgeville's economy in response to the downsizing of Central State Hospital. Combined with state budget cuts and the closure of several correctional facilities, these changes significantly affected the availability of local jobs and economic stability. As a result, the Milledgeville community has focused on attracting private investment, supporting small businesses, and expanding job opportunities in other sectors.

== Geography ==
Milledgeville is situated along the Atlantic Seaboard fall line, a geological boundary that marks the transition between the Piedmont and Coastal Plain regions of the United States. This location results in gently rolling terrain and a mix of soil types, including red clay common in the Piedmont region. The city lies along the Fall Line Freeway, a major east–west transportation corridor that follows the fall line and connects Milledgeville to other historically significant cities in Georgia, including Columbus, Macon, and Augusta.

Milledgeville has a total area of 20.42 sq mi (52.89 km^{2}), of which 20.26 sq mi (52.47 km^{2}) is land and 0.161 sq mi (0.416 km^{2}), or 0.79%, is water. The Oconee River flows just east of the downtown area and continues southwards to merge with the Altamaha River, eventually reaching the Atlantic Ocean. Just north of the city lies Lake Sinclair, a 15,300-acre reservoir made by damming the Oconee River in 1953.

=== Climate ===
Milledgeville has a humid subtropical climate (Köppen Cfa) with hot, humid summers and mild winters. Average high temperatures peak in July, while January tends to be the coldest month. Rainfall is relatively evenly distributed throughout the year, with summer thunderstorms being common. Snowfall is rare but does occasionally occur during the winter months.

Climate data for Milledgeville, Georgia, 1991–2020 normals, extremes 1891–2017
Month	Jan	Feb	Mar	Apr	May	Jun	Jul	Aug	Sep	Oct	Nov	Dec	Year
Record high °F (°C)	79 (26)	86 (30)	94 (34)	98 (37)	101 (38)	109 (43)	110 (43)	110 (43)	108 (42)	101 (38)	90 (32)	83 (28)	110 (43)
Mean maximum °F (°C)	74.1 (23.4)	77.9 (25.5)	84.3 (29.1)	88.6 (31.4)	93.3 (34.1)	98.9 (37.2)	100.1 (37.8)	100.0 (37.8)	95.2 (35.1)	88.6 (31.4)	82.2 (27.9)	75.5 (24.2)	102.1 (38.9)
Mean daily maximum °F (°C)	58 (14)	59 (15)	65 (18)	74 (23)	81 (27)	90 (32)	92 (33)	91 (33)	81 (27)	76 (24)	64 (18)	58 (14)	74 (23)
Daily mean °F (°C)	45.5 (7.5)	49.0 (9.4)	55.6 (13.1)	62.7 (17.1)	71.0 (21.7)	78.2 (25.7)	81.8 (27.7)	80.6 (27.0)	75.1 (23.9)	64.7 (18.2)	54.2 (12.3)	48.1 (8.9)	63.9 (17.7)
Mean daily minimum °F (°C)	33.0 (0.6)	36.1 (2.3)	41.9 (5.5)	48.8 (9.3)	57.9 (14.4)	66.8 (19.3)	70.3 (21.3)	69.8 (21.0)	63.9 (17.7)	52.0 (11.1)	40.5 (4.7)	35.9 (2.2)	51.4 (10.8)
Mean minimum °F (°C)	16.6 (−8.6)	20.2 (−6.6)	25.7 (−3.5)	32.8 (0.4)	43.6 (6.4)	56.0 (13.3)	62.4 (16.9)	61.0 (16.1)	48.9 (9.4)	34.8 (1.6)	26.3 (−3.2)	19.0 (−7.2)	13.3 (−10.4)
Record low °F (°C)	−3 (−19)	8 (−13)	13 (−11)	25 (−4)	37 (3)	45 (7)	54 (12)	53 (12)	36 (2)	24 (−4)	10 (−12)	1 (−17)	−3 (−19)
Average precipitation inches (mm)	4.20 (107)	4.40 (112)	4.75 (121)	3.90 (99)	3.16 (80)	4.30 (109)	4.16 (106)	4.73 (120)	4.22 (107)	2.83 (72)	3.36 (85)	4.49 (114)	48.5 (1,232)
Average snowfall inches (cm)	0.3 (0.76)	0.2 (0.51)	0.0 (0.0)	0.0 (0.0)	0.0 (0.0)	0.0 (0.0)	0.0 (0.0)	0.0 (0.0)	0.0 (0.0)	0.0 (0.0)	0.0 (0.0)	0.1 (0.25)	0.6 (1.52)
Average precipitation days (≥ 0.01 in)	10.4	8.9	9.2	7.4	7.4	10.6	11.0	11.1	7.9	6.9	7.7	9.5	108.0
Average snowy days (≥ 0.1 in)	0.2	0.1	0.0	0.0	0.0	0.0	0.0	0.0	0.0	0.0	0.0	0.1	0.4
Source 1: NOAA
Source 2: National Weather Service (mean maxima/minima 1981–2010)

== Demographics ==
Historical population
Census	Pop.	Note	%±
1810	1,256		—
1820	2,069		64.7%
1840	2,095		—
1850	2,216		5.8%
1860	2,480		11.9%
1870	2,750		10.9%
1880	3,800		38.2%
1890	3,322		−12.6%
1900	4,219		27.0%
1910	4,385		3.9%
1920	4,619		5.3%
1930	5,534		19.8%
1940	6,778		22.5%
1950	8,835		30.3%
1960	11,117		25.8%
1970	11,601		4.4%
1980	12,176		5.0%
1990	17,727		45.6%
2000	18,757		5.8%
2010	17,715		−5.6%
2020	17,070		−3.6%
U.S. Decennial Census

=== Racial and ethnic composition ===
Milledgeville city, Georgia – Racial and ethnic composition Note: the US Census treats Hispanic/Latino as an ethnic category. This table excludes Latinos from the racial categories and assigns them to a separate category. Hispanics/Latinos may be of any race.
Race / Ethnicity (NH = Non-Hispanic)	Pop 2000	Pop 2010	Pop 2020	% 2000	% 2010	% 2020
White alone (NH)	9,217	9,287	8,055	49.14%	52.42%	47.19%
Black or African American alone (NH)	8,921	7,432	7,685	47.56%	41.95%	45.02%
Native American or Alaska Native alone (NH)	20	23	23	0.11%	0.13%	0.13%
Asian alone (NH)	286	307	280	1.52%	1.73%	1.64%
Native Hawaiian or Pacific Islander alone (NH)	1	10	16	0.01%	0.06%	0.09%
Other race alone (NH)	8	30	117	0.04%	0.17%	0.69%
Mixed race or Multiracial (NH)	73	224	339	0.39%	1.26%	1.99%
Hispanic or Latino (any race)	231	402	555	1.23%	2.27%	3.25%
Total	18,757	17,715	17,070	100.00%	100.00%	100.00%

=== 2020 census ===
As of the 2020 census, Milledgeville had a population of 17,070, reflecting a slight decline from the 2010 population of 17,715.

The median age was 29.4 years. 14.6% of residents were under the age of 18 and 12.8% of residents were 65 years of age or older. For every 100 females there were 103.2 males, and for every 100 females age 18 and over there were 102.9 males age 18 and over.

89.3% of residents lived in urban areas, while 10.7% lived in rural areas.

There were 5,575 households in Milledgeville, of which 24.9% had children under the age of 18 living in them. Of all households, 24.1% were married-couple households, 24.2% were households with a male householder and no spouse or partner present, and 46.6% were households with a female householder and no spouse or partner present. About 38.3% of all households were made up of individuals and 12.9% had someone living alone who was 65 years of age or older.

There were 6,981 housing units, of which 20.1% were vacant. The homeowner vacancy rate was 2.1% and the rental vacancy rate was 18.4%.

=== Income and poverty ===
The median household income in Milledgeville was approximately $39,669, which is below both the state and national averages, and the poverty rate stood at approximately 41.3%, significantly higher than the national average of 13.5%.

== Economy ==
In recent decades, Milledgeville's economy has undergone significant changes as the community worked to offset the decline of employment at state-run facilities. The downsizing of Central State Hospital, combined with state budget cuts and the closure of multiple correctional institutions, led to substantial job losses and economic challenges in the area. The impact was further intensified in the late 2000s, when the city's manufacturing sector contracted. In 2008, Rheem Manufacturing closed its Milledgeville operations, relocating production to Mexico and eliminating approximately 1,500 jobs. Shortly afterward, Shaw Industries shut down its carpet yarn plant, resulting in an additional 150 job losses.

In response to these shifts, local leaders have prioritized diversifying Milledgeville's economy by attracting private investment, supporting small businesses, and expanding opportunities across a broader range of industries. Efforts to recruit new industries and improve local infrastructure have included grant-supported improvements to the Smith-Sibley Industrial Park and initiatives focused on downtown revitalization.

As of 2025, the leading sectors of Milledgeville's economy by employment numbers include healthcare and social services, education, retail, and public administration. Healthcare and social services account for the largest share of employment, with over 3,600 jobs across more than 200 establishments. Education services, including Milledgeville's colleges and schools, contribute approximately 2,100 jobs. Retail trade and public administration also remain major employment sectors, with around 2,100 and 1,600 jobs respectively.

Milledgeville's higher education institutions and local tourism, in particular, contribute significantly to employment and commercial activity. The presence of Georgia College & State University and Georgia Military College provides not only job opportunities but also drives local business activity through student spending, cultural events, and campus-related initiatives. Tourism adds to the economic base as well, with visitors drawn to attractions such as the Milledgeville Historic District, Antebellum architecture, Flannery O'Connor's Andalusia Farm, and outdoor recreation at Lake Sinclair. In 2016, tourism generated $88.7 million in direct spending in Baldwin County, supported 796 jobs, and contributed over $6 million in state and local tax revenue.

== Government ==
The Milledgeville City Council is the city's legislative body, responsible for passing ordinances and resolutions and overseeing the city's budget. The council consists of six members, each elected to represent one of the city's districts, while the mayor is elected at-large for a four-year term. Together, the mayor and council oversee public spaces, city infrastructure, nuisance regulation, public safety, and the management of street and sidewalk improvements, among other responsibilities.

Mary Parham-Copelan, elected in 2017, serves as mayor.

== Education ==
=== Public schools ===
Milledgeville's public schools are operated by the Baldwin County School District, which includes multiple elementary, middle, and high schools, as well as early learning and early college programs. As of the 2023–2024 school year, the district serves approximately 4,588 students with 348.90 full-time equivalent (FTE) classroom teachers, resulting in a student–teacher ratio of about 13.15:1. The district includes four elementary schools (Lakeview Academy, Lakeview Primary, Midway Hills Academy, and Midway Hills Primary), one middle school (Oak Hill Middle School), one high school (Baldwin High School), the Early Learning Center (for Pre-K students), and Georgia College Early College (serving students in grades 6 through 12).

=== Private schools ===
Private K–12 education is available through Georgia Military College Preparatory School and John Milledge Academy, both serving grades K-12. These schools offer alternatives to public education, with programs that emphasize college preparation, character development, and extracurricular involvement.

=== Higher education ===
Milledgeville is home to three institutions of higher education. Georgia College & State University is the state's designated public liberal arts university, offering undergraduate and graduate programs across a wide range of disciplines. Georgia Military College serves as a public military junior college, with both associate and bachelor's degree programs. In addition, Central Georgia Technical College operates a local campus that provides career-focused technical training and adult education programs.

== Infrastructure ==
Highways include:

- U.S. Route 441
- Georgia State Route 22
- Georgia State Route 24
- Georgia State Route 49

Baldwin County operates a demand-response public transportation service.

Baldwin County Regional Airport is a general aviation airport located approximately 5 miles (8.0 km) north of downtown Milledgeville.

== Historic buildings and locations ==
A short distance from Milledgeville is Beckom's Mount, on the edge of what was known (at least in the early 20th century) as "Big Gulley". It is there that Major Samuel Beckom (1760–1825), a major in the Revolutionary War, is buried. Beckom had been misinformed about an impending raid by local Indians and went off to warn locals and gather reinforcements. At the garrison he left behind to protect Fort Wilkinson, a massacre occurred in his absence. His wife and three children were included in the victims. Beckom, despite his grief, guarded the fort from potential future attacks. For his services, he was granted an estate, which he named Beckom's Mount.

=== National register of historic places ===
See National Register of Historic Places listings in Baldwin County, Georgia for entries located in Milledgeville.

=== Other historic buildings ===
Other historic buildings In Milledgeville include:

- Tomlinson Fort House

== Notable people ==
- Melvin Adams Jr, better known as Fish Scales, from the band Nappy Roots
- Andrew J. Allen, concert saxophonist
- Nathan Crawford Barnett, Georgia Secretary of State for more than 30 years
- Ella Barksdale Brown, journalist, educator
- Kevin Brown, professional baseball player
- Javon Bullard, college football player for the University of Georgia
- Tasha Butts, basketball player and coach
- Wally Butts, college football coach
- Earnest Byner, professional football player
- Mary Ann Lamar Cobb, first lady of Georgia
- Lisa Cook, American economist
- Pete Dexter, novelist, journalist and screenwriter
- George Doles, Confederate Brigadier General
- Henry Derek Elis, vocalist for heavy metal supergroup Act of Defiance
- Tomlinson Fort (congressman), politician
- Tillie K. Fowler, politician
- Joel Godard, television announcer
- Marjorie Taylor Greene, U.S. representative for Georgia
- Willie Greene, professional baseball player
- Floyd Griffin, mayor of Milledgeville, state representative, state senator
- Oliver Hardy, motion picture comedian
- Nick Harper, professional football player
- Charles Holmes Herty, academic, scientist, businessman and first football coach at the University of Georgia
- Leroy Hill, professional football player
- Maurice Hurt, professional football player
- Edwin Francis Jemison, Civil War soldier who died in battle
- Sherrilyn Kenyon, author
- Grace Lumpkin, writer
- William Gibbs McAdoo, US Secretary of the Treasury
- David Brydie Mitchell, the only Governor of Georgia buried in Milledgeville
- Celena Mondie-Milner, professional track and field player
- Powell A. Moore, politician and public servant
- Otis Murphy, international saxophone soloist and professor at Indiana University Jacobs School of Music
- Flannery O'Connor, author, winner of the 1972 U.S. National Book Award for Fiction
- Ulrich Bonnell Phillips, historian
- Barry Reese, writer
- Lucius Sanford, professional football player
- Carrie Bell Sinclair, poet
- Tut Taylor, bluegrass musician
- Ellis Paul Torrance, psychologist
- Larry Turner, professional basketball player
- William Usery Jr., labor union activist and U.S. Secretary of Labor
- Carl Vinson, congressman
- J. T. Wall, professional football player
- Rico Washington, professional baseball player
- Rondell White, professional baseball player
- Robert McAlpin Williamson, Republic of Texas Supreme Court Justice and Texas Ranger
