= Baldwin County, Georgia =

County in Georgia, United States

- County
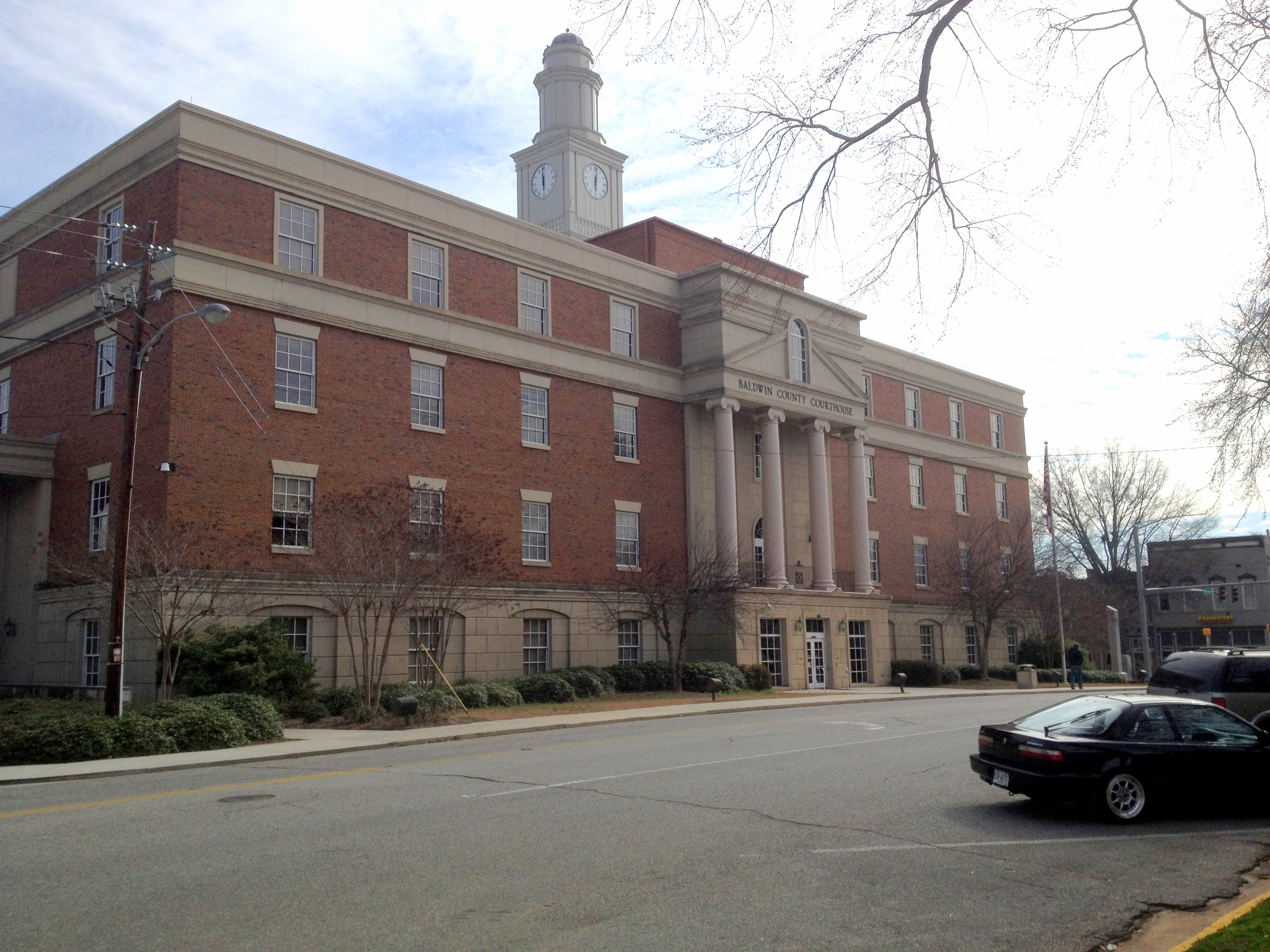
- Baldwin County Courthouse

- Seal

- Location within the U.S. state of Georgia
- Coordinates: 33°04′N 83°15′W
- Country: United States
- State: Georgia
- Founded: 1803; 223 years ago
- Named for: Abraham Baldwin
- Seat: Milledgeville
- Largest city: Milledgeville

Area
  - Total: 267 sq mi (690 km^{2})
  - Land: 258 sq mi (670 km^{2})
  - Water: 9.6 sq mi (25 km^{2}) 3.6%

Population (2020)
  - Total: 43,799
  - Estimate (2025): 44,029 ▲
  - Density: 170/sq mi (66/km^{2})
- Time zone: UTC−5 (Eastern)
  - Summer (DST): UTC−4 (EDT)
- Congressional district: 8th
- Website: baldwincountyga.com

Baldwin County is a county located in the central portion of the U.S. state of Georgia. As of the 2020 census, its population was 43,799. The county seat is Milledgeville, which was developed along the Oconee River. Baldwin County forms the entirity of the Milledgeville micropolitan area, a statistical area (μSA). The μSA also included Hancock County until the 2023 OMB statistical area updates when the county was removed.

== History ==
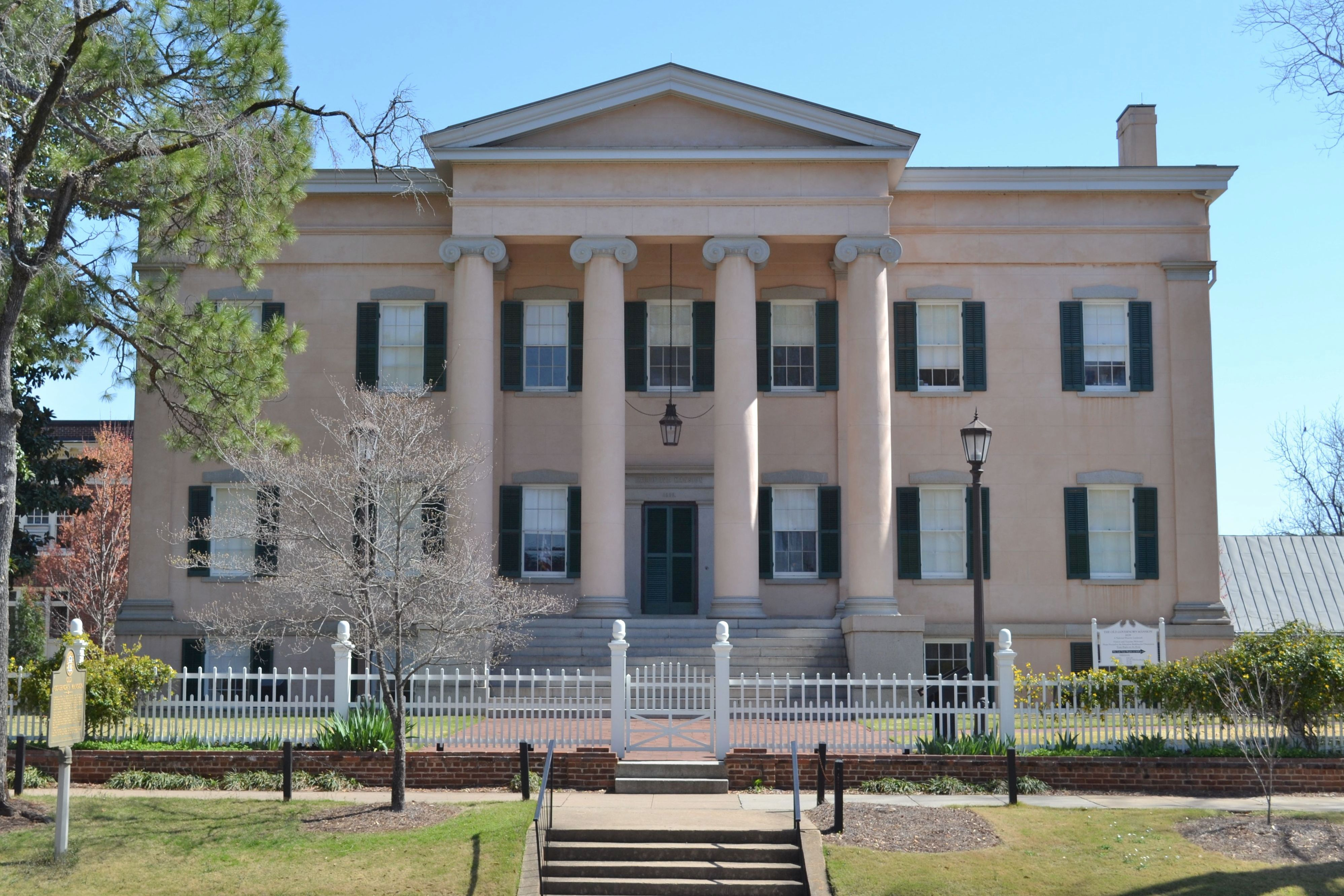
Old Governor's House

For centuries, the land was occupied by the Creek Nation, and for thousands of years before them, varying cultures of indigenous peoples.

Part of the land ceded by the Creek people in the Treaty of Fort Wilkinson in 1802 was used to create Baldwin County on May 11, 1803, by the Georgia General Assembly, the state's legislative body.

The land west of the Oconee River was organized as Baldwin and Wilkinson Counties. The Treaty of Washington with the Creek in 1805 extended the state's western boundary to the Ocmulgee River. A legislative act on June 26, 1806, added some of this additional land to both counties.

The state legislature subsequently passed an act on December 10, 1807, that created four new counties from Baldwin County's 1806 borders. It expanded Baldwin to the east with land from Hancock and Washington Counties. The new counties were Morgan, Jones, Putnam, and present-day Jasper (originally named Randolph County at the time of the act).

The county is named for Abraham Baldwin, a signer of the United States Constitution, U.S. congressman representing Georgia, and the founder of the University of Georgia. White settlers moved into the area and developed large cotton plantations, made possible by the labor of slaves. Since the invention of the cotton gin, short-staple cotton could be profitably processed, and it was well-suited to the uplands of Georgia. What became known as the Black Belt of Georgia, an arc of fertile soil, was one of the destinations for slaves being sold from the Upper South, as well as from the Low Country.

The county seat of Milledgeville, formerly the state capital of Georgia (1804–1868), is one of only 3 planned capital cities in the United States along with Washington, D.C. and Indianapolis, IN.

Because of its central location within the state and its abundant supply of water from the Oconee River, Milledgeville grew rapidly into a bustling frontier town. On November 2, 1807, the state legislature held its first session in the newly completed statehouse in Milledgeville. Georgia's first state penitentiary was also built within the historic city limits of Milledgeville in 1817. This site is now used as the main campus of Georgia College and State University. In 1837, the General Assembly provided for the establishment of the state's first mental asylum, today known as Central State Hospital.

When the state of Georgia seceded from the Union in January 1861, during a legislative session held in Milledgeville, Baldwin County became a target for Union forces. When Union general William T. Sherman made his devastating March to the Sea through Georgia, his troops occupied the capital city in November 1864. Sherman and his Union armies burned the state penitentiary, vandalized the city, and held a mock session of the legislature in the statehouse to repeal the state's ordinance of secession.

In 1868, after the Civil War (1861–65), Georgia's capital was moved from Milledgeville to its present location in Atlanta. Today, Milledgeville is home to two institutions of higher education: Georgia College and State University and Georgia Military College. Founded in 1889 as the Georgia Normal and Industrial College for Women, Georgia College and State University has since grown to become the state's premier public liberal-arts university. Georgia Military College, founded in 1879, now occupies the Old Capitol Building.

In addition to the Old Capitol and Governor's Mansion, visitors to Baldwin County can explore Andalusia, the family farm of writer Flannery O'Connor; Milledgeville's historic district; and the Lockerly Arboretum, a botanical garden and nature education center that hosts the Lockerly Heritage Festival each September.

== Geography ==
According to the U.S. Census Bureau, the county has a total area of 267 square miles (690 km^{2}), of which 9.6 square miles (25 km^{2}) (3.6%) is covered by water.

The county is located along the fall line of the Eastern United States. The city of Milledgeville, which is located along the Oconee River, is an important city in the region. Because of its location, the northern part of the county tends to be more hilly due to its location in the Piedmont than the southern part of the county, which is in the far northern part of the Atlantic coastal plain.

Most of Baldwin County, south of Lake Sinclair, is located in the Lower Oconee River sub-basin of the Altamaha River basin. The northern portion of the county is located in the Upper Oconee River sub-basin of the same Altamaha River basin.

=== Adjacent counties ===
- Putnam County, Georgia - north
- Hancock County, Georgia - northeast
- Washington County, Georgia - east
- Wilkinson County, Georgia - south
- Jones County, Georgia - west

== Communities ==
=== City ===
- Milledgeville (county seat)

=== Census-designated place ===
- Hardwick

=== Unincorporated community ===
- Scottsboro

== Demographics ==
Historical population
Census	Pop.	Note	%±
1810	6,356		—
1820	7,734		21.7%
1830	7,295		−5.7%
1840	7,250		−0.6%
1850	8,148		12.4%
1860	9,078		11.4%
1870	10,618		17.0%
1880	13,806		30.0%
1890	14,608		5.8%
1900	17,768		21.6%
1910	18,354		3.3%
1920	19,791		7.8%
1930	22,878		15.6%
1940	24,190		5.7%
1950	29,706		22.8%
1960	34,064		14.7%
1970	34,240		0.5%
1980	34,686		1.3%
1990	39,530		14.0%
2000	44,700		13.1%
2010	45,720		2.3%
2020	43,799		−4.2%
2025 (est.)	44,029	▲	0.5%
U.S. Decennial Census; 1790-1880 1890-1910; 1920-1930 1930-1940; 1940-1950 1960-1980; 1980-2000 2010

As of the 2000 census, the Milledgeville μSA (at the time, larger than just Baldwin County) had a population of 54,776 (though a July 1, 2009 estimate placed the population at 55,556). There were 54,776 people, 17,995 households, and 12,154 families residing within the μSA.

=== Racial and ethnic composition ===
Baldwin County, Georgia – Racial and ethnic composition Note: the US Census treats Hispanic/Latino as an ethnic category. This table excludes Latinos from the racial categories and assigns them to a separate category. Hispanics/Latinos may be of any race.
Race / Ethnicity (NH = Non-Hispanic)	Pop 1980	Pop 1990	Pop 2000	Pop 2010	Pop 2020	% 1980	% 1990	% 2000	% 2010	% 2020
White alone (NH)	21,276	22,209	23,920	24,704	22,432	61.34%	56.18%	53.51%	54.03%	51.22%
Black or African American alone (NH)	12,816	16,668	19,324	18,866	18,318	36.95%	42.17%	43.23%	41.26%	41.82%
Native American or Alaska Native alone (NH)	29	44	79	85	64	0.08%	0.11%	0.18%	0.19%	0.15%
Asian alone (NH)	81	257	442	580	599	0.23%	0.65%	0.99%	1.27%	1.37%
Native Hawaiian or Pacific Islander alone (NH)	x	x	3	18	27	x	x	0.01%	0.04%	0.06%
Other race alone (NH)	30	3	37	55	193	0.09%	0.01%	0.08%	0.12%	0.44%
Mixed race or Multiracial (NH)	x	x	288	493	1,027	x	x	0.64%	1.08%	2.34%
Hispanic or Latino (any race)	454	349	607	919	1,139	1.31%	0.88%	1.36%	2.01%	2.60%
Total	34,686	39,530	44,700	45,720	43,799	100.00%	100.00%	100.00%	100.00%	100.00%

=== 2020 census ===
As of the 2020 census, 43,799 people, 16,511 households, and 9,568 families lived in the county. Of the residents, 18.4% were under the age of 18 and 17.3% were 65 years of age or older; the median age was 38.4 years. For every 100 females there were 96.8 males, and for every 100 females age 18 and over there were 95.2 males. 51.2% of residents lived in urban areas and 48.8% lived in rural areas.

The racial makeup of the county was 51.7% White, 42.0% Black or African American, 0.2% American Indian and Alaska Native, 1.4% Asian, 0.1% Native Hawaiian and Pacific Islander, 1.5% from some other race, and 3.1% from two or more races. Hispanic or Latino residents of any race comprised 2.6% of the population.

There were 16,511 households in the county, of which 26.6% had children under the age of 18 living with them and 36.5% had a female householder with no spouse or partner present. About 31.7% of all households were made up of individuals and 12.2% had someone living alone who was 65 years of age or older.

There were 19,988 housing units, of which 17.4% were vacant. Among occupied housing units, 57.9% were owner-occupied and 42.1% were renter-occupied. The homeowner vacancy rate was 1.5% and the rental vacancy rate was 14.5%.

== Government ==
Members of the Baldwin County Board of Commissioners are responsible for administering the government to residents. Five members serve on the board, elected from single-member districts. Commissioners served 4 year terms up until 2024 when legislation allowed for staggered elections. The 2024 Election will be the last in which all commissioners are up for election simultaneously. Now, Districts 1-2 will share the ballot every 4 years beginning in 2028, and commissioners elected in 2024 to represent districts 3, 4 and 5 will serve a 2-year term, to end in 2026, and thereafter terms will be 4 years. The members of the board elect the chair from amongst themselves.

Board of commissioners
District	Commissioner	Party
District 1	Emily Davis	Democratic
District 2	Kendrick Butts	Democratic
District 3	Sammy Hall	Republican
District 4	Andrew Strickland	Republican
District 5	Scott Little	Republican

== Politics ==
Baldwin County has been a highly competitive swing county in recent presidential elections, with no candidate receiving more than 52.9% of the vote in any election from 1992 onward. The county was the only one in Georgia that failed to give a majority to either major-party candidate in the 2018 gubernatorial election, with Democrat Stacey Abrams winning the county by only 58 votes over Republican Brian Kemp. Baldwin County, along with neighboring Washington County, was one of 2 counties that gave a plurality of votes to Herschel Walker in the first round of the 2022 Senate election but then gave a majority of votes to Raphael Warnock in the subsequent run-off.

As recently as 2018, Democrats held all county constitutional offices with the exception of Surveyor (R). Since then, the Sheriff, Superior Court Clerk and Tax Commissioner have registered as Independents, and a Republican now serves as Solicitor General. Democrats still hold the Coroner's Office and Chief Magistrate.

Baldwin County voted for the Republican candidate in all eight statewide executive offices in 2022. In the Georgia General Assembly, the state's legislature, Republican Rick Williams represents the county in the Georgia State Senate. Democrats Mack Jackson, and Floyd Griffin represent the county in the Georgia House of Representatives.

For elections to the Georgia State Senate, Baldwin County is part of District 25. For elections to the Georgia House of Representatives, Baldwin County is divided between districts 128 and 149.

United States presidential election results for Baldwin County, Georgia
Year	Republican		Democratic		Third party(ies)	
Year	No.	%	No.	%	No.	%
1912	24	3.47%	621	89.74%	47	6.79%
1916	65	9.48%	579	84.40%	42	6.12%
1920	92	14.24%	554	85.76%	0	0.00%
1924	107	10.87%	826	83.94%	51	5.18%
1928	270	27.49%	712	72.51%	0	0.00%
1932	45	5.27%	801	93.79%	8	0.94%
1936	113	12.20%	811	87.58%	2	0.22%
1940	203	13.36%	1,313	86.38%	4	0.26%
1944	307	19.02%	1,307	80.98%	0	0.00%
1948	559	26.68%	1,132	54.03%	404	19.28%
1952	1,023	30.62%	2,318	69.38%	0	0.00%
1956	1,080	32.19%	2,275	67.81%	0	0.00%
1960	1,264	35.85%	2,262	64.15%	0	0.00%
1964	3,430	55.59%	2,740	44.41%	0	0.00%
1968	2,318	32.60%	2,115	29.74%	2,678	37.66%
1972	4,826	77.08%	1,435	22.92%	0	0.00%
1976	3,612	43.59%	4,674	56.41%	0	0.00%
1980	3,639	43.71%	4,368	52.46%	319	3.83%
1984	5,717	59.74%	3,853	40.26%	0	0.00%
1988	5,852	59.05%	4,008	40.44%	51	0.51%
1992	4,262	36.16%	5,813	49.31%	1,713	14.53%
1996	4,570	40.79%	5,740	51.23%	895	7.99%
2000	6,041	49.82%	5,893	48.60%	192	1.58%
2004	7,709	52.89%	6,775	46.48%	91	0.62%
2008	7,823	47.23%	8,587	51.84%	154	0.93%
2012	7,589	46.64%	8,483	52.14%	198	1.22%
2016	7,697	47.76%	7,970	49.45%	449	2.79%
2020	8,903	48.75%	9,140	50.05%	218	1.19%
2024	9,574	50.86%	9,159	48.65%	92	0.49%

United States Senate election results for Baldwin County, Georgia2
Year	Republican		Democratic		Third party(ies)	
Year	No.	%	No.	%	No.	%
2020	8,873	49.07%	8,783	48.57%	426	2.36%
2020	7,931	48.22%	8,515	51.78%	0	0.00%

United States Senate election results for Baldwin County, Georgia3
Year	Republican		Democratic		Third party(ies)	
Year	No.	%	No.	%	No.	%
2020	4,639	25.94%	6,167	34.48%	7,079	39.58%
2020	7,899	47.97%	8,569	52.03%	0	0.00%
2022	7,416	49.58%	7,327	48.99%	214	1.43%
2022	6,854	49.45%	7,007	50.55%	0	0.00%

Georgia Gubernatorial election results for Baldwin County
Year	Republican		Democratic		Third party(ies)	
Year	No.	%	No.	%	No.	%
2022	7,987	53.24%	6,913	46.08%	102	0.68%

== Transportation ==
=== Major highways ===
- U.S. Route 441 / State Route 29
  - U.S. Route 441 Business / State Route 29 Business
- State Route 22
- State Route 24
- State Route 49
- State Route 112
- State Route 212
- State Route 540 (Fall Line Freeway)

=== Hiking and cycling ===
- Oconee River Greenway

== Notable people ==
- Carl Vinson, who served for 50 years in the U.S. Congress, was born in Baldwin County.
- Oliver Hardy, comedian and film director, began his career in the Milledgeville Opera House.
- Flannery O'Connor, novelist and short-story writer, lived in Milledgeville.
- Lisa Cook, Member of the Federal Reserve Board of Governors.

== See also ==
- National Register of Historic Places listings in Baldwin County, Georgia
- List of counties in Georgia
