= List of elections in 1890 =

The following elections occurred in the year 1890.

- 1890 Japanese general election
- 1890 Peruvian presidential election

== North America ==
=== Canada ===
- 1890 British Columbia general election
- 1890 New Brunswick general election
- 1890 Nova Scotia general election
- 1890 Ontario general election
- 1890 Prince Edward Island general election
- 1890 Quebec general election

=== United States ===
- 1890 Minnesota Senate election
- 1890 New York state election
- 1890 United States elections

==== United States Senate ====
- 1890–91 United States Senate elections

==== United States House of Representatives ====
- 1890 United States House of Representatives elections
- United States House of Representatives elections in California, 1890
- United States House of Representatives elections in Florida, 1890
- United States House of Representatives elections in South Carolina, 1890
- United States House of Representatives elections in Wyoming, 1890

==== United States lieutenant gubernatorial ====
- 1890 California lieutenant gubernatorial election
- 1890 Connecticut lieutenant gubernatorial election
- 1890 Minnesota lieutenant gubernatorial election
- 1890 Nebraska lieutenant gubernatorial election
- 1890 Texas lieutenant gubernatorial election
- 1890 Wisconsin lieutenant gubernatorial election

==== United States gubernatorial ====
- 1890 Alabama gubernatorial election
- 1890 Arkansas gubernatorial election
- 1890 California gubernatorial election
- 1890 Colorado gubernatorial election
- 1890 Connecticut gubernatorial election
- 1890 Delaware gubernatorial election
- 1890 Georgia gubernatorial election
- 1890 Idaho gubernatorial election
- 1890 Kansas gubernatorial election
- 1890 Maine gubernatorial election
- 1890 Massachusetts gubernatorial election
- 1890 Michigan gubernatorial election
- 1890 Minnesota gubernatorial election
- 1890 Nebraska gubernatorial election
- 1890 Nevada gubernatorial election
- 1890 New Hampshire gubernatorial election
- 1890 North Dakota gubernatorial election
- 1890 Oregon gubernatorial election
- 1890 Pennsylvania gubernatorial election
- 1890 Rhode Island gubernatorial election
- 1890 South Carolina gubernatorial election
- 1890 South Dakota gubernatorial election
- 1890 Tennessee gubernatorial election
- 1890 Texas gubernatorial election
- 1890 United States gubernatorial elections
- 1890 Vermont gubernatorial election
- 1890 Wisconsin gubernatorial election
- 1890 Wyoming gubernatorial election

==== United States mayoral elections ====
- 1890 Boston mayoral election
- 1890 Manchester, New Hampshire, mayoral election
- 1890 New York City mayoral election

== Europe ==
- 1890 Belgian general election
- 1890 Bulgarian parliamentary election
- 1890 Danish Folketing election
- 1890 German federal election
- 1890 Greek parliamentary election
- 1890 Italian general election
- 1890 Liechtenstein general election
- 1890 Luxembourg general election
- 1890 Portuguese legislative election
- 1890 Serbian parliamentary election
- 1890 Swedish general election
- 1890 Swiss federal election

=== United Kingdom ===
- 1890 Ayr Burghs by-election
- 1890 Bristol West by-election
- 1890 Caernarvon Boroughs by-election
- 1890 East Waterford by-election
- 1890 East Worcester by-election
- 1890 Eccles by-election
- 1890 Mid Tipperary by-election
- 1890 Mid Glamorgan by-election
- 1890 North St Pancras by-election
- 1890 Partick by-election
- 1890 Poplar by-election
- 1890 Stamford by-election

== Oceania ==
=== Australia ===
- 1890 South Australian colonial election

=== New Zealand ===
- 1890 New Zealand general election
- 1890 Timaru by-election

== See also ==
- Category:1890 elections
