= 1890 United States gubernatorial elections =

- November 4, 1890 (Note: Alabama, Arkansas, Georgia, Idaho, Maine, Oregon, Rhode Island, Vermont and Wyoming held early elections.)

27 governorships
	Majority party	Minority party
Party	Democratic	Republican
Seats before	22	20
Seats after	28	16
Seat change	▲6	▼4
Seats up	8	17
Seats won	14	13
- Democratic gain Democratic hold Republican gain Republican hold

United States gubernatorial elections were held in 1890, in 27 states, concurrent with the House and Senate elections, on November 4, 1890 (except in Alabama, Arkansas, Georgia, Idaho, Maine, Oregon, Rhode Island, Vermont and Wyoming, which held early elections).

In New Hampshire, the newly elected Governor's term began in the January following the election for the first time, rather than in the following June as previously.

Idaho and Wyoming held their first gubernatorial elections on achieving statehood.

== Results ==
State	Incumbent	Party	Status	Opposing candidates
Alabama (held, 4 August 1890)	Thomas Seay	Democratic	Retired to run for U.S. Senate, Democratic victory	Thomas G. Jones (Democratic) 76.12% Benjamin M. Long (Republican) 23.06% L. C. Coulson (Prohibition) 0.75% Scattering 0.06%
Arkansas (held, 1 September 1890)	James Philip Eagle	Democratic	Re-elected, 55.51%	Napoleon B. Fizer (Union Labor) (Note: Some sources indicate Fizer ran under a fusion ticket between the Republicans and the Union Labor Party.) 44.49%
California	Robert Waterman (acting)	Republican	Retired, Republican victory	Henry Markham (Republican) 49.55% Edward B. Pond (Democratic) 46.41% John Bidwell (Prohibition) 4.02% Scattering 0.03%
Colorado	Job Adams Cooper	Republican	Retired, Republican victory	John Long Routt (Republican) 50.11% Caldwell Yeaman (Democratic) 42.36% John G. Coy (Farmers Alliance) 6.23% John A. Elett (Prohibition) 1.27% Scattering 0.03%
Connecticut	Morgan Bulkeley	Republican	Lost renomination. Following disputed election, remained in office for following term after legislature failed to resolve election. (Note: Under Connecticut law, a candidate needed 50% of the vote to win the election, or the state legislature would decide the election. The legality of some votes were contested. The Republican House and Democratic Senate deadlocked, and no choice was made. The Connecticut Supreme Court ruled that Bulkeley would serve the term as acting governor.)	Luzon B. Morris (Democratic) 50.01% Samuel E. Merwin (Republican) 47.28% Phineas M. Augur (Prohibition) 2.52% Henry C. Baldwin (Labor) 0.15% Scattering 0.03%
Delaware	Benjamin T. Biggs	Democratic	Term-limited, Democratic victory	Robert J. Reynolds (Democratic) 50.43% Harry A. Richardson (Republican) 48.89% William T. Kellum (Prohibition) 0.67%
Georgia (held, 1 October 1890)	John Brown Gordon	Democratic	Term-limited, Democratic victory	William J. Northen (Democratic) unopposed (Note: Although many sources record Northen as unopposed, some record the result as Northen 102,757, scattering 750. The Georgia House and Senate Journals record that Northen received 105,365 votes, and that this was a majority of the whole votes cast, but do not record the votes cast for other candidates. It would appear that votes for another candidate were cast in Chatham County.)
Idaho (held, 1 October 1890)	New state			George L. Shoup (Republican) 56.35% Benjamin Wilson (Democratic) 43.65%
Kansas	Lyman U. Humphrey	Republican	Re-elected, 39.05%	John F. Willits (Populist) 36.31% Charles L. Robinson (Democratic) 24.22% A. M. Richardson (Prohibition) 0.42%
Maine (held, 8 September 1890)	Edwin C. Burleigh	Republican	Re-elected, 56.42%	William P. Thompson (Democratic) 39.82% Aaron Clark (Prohibition) 2.62% Isaac C. Clark (Labor) 1.14% Scattering 0.01%
Massachusetts	John Q. A. Brackett	Republican	Defeated, 46.04%	William E. Russell (Democratic) 49.21% John Blackmer (Prohibition) 4.75%
Michigan	Cyrus G. Luce	Republican	Retired, Democratic victory	Edwin B. Winans (Democratic) 46.18% James Munroe Turner (Republican) 43.28% Azariah S. Partridge (Prohibition) 7.21% Eugene H. Belden (Industrial) 3.32% Scattering 0.01%
Minnesota	William Rush Merriam	Republican	Re-elected, 36.58%	Thomas Wilson (Democratic) 35.64% Sidney M. Owen (Farmers Alliance) 24.29% James P. Pinkham (Prohibition) 3.50%
Nebraska	John Milton Thayer	Republican	Lost renomination, Democratic victory (Note: Disputed election. Boyd was removed from office by the Nebraska Supreme Court in May 1891 and Thayer installed in his place. Boyd's citizenship would be upheld by the U.S. Supreme Court and he would be restored to office in February 1892.)	James E. Boyd (Democratic) 33.32% J. H. Powers (Populist) 32.78% L. D. Richards (Republican) 32.17% B. L. Paine (Prohibition) 1.72% Scattering 0.01%
Nevada	Frank Bell (acting)	Republican	[data missing]	Roswell K. Colcord (Republican) 53.27% Theodore Winters (Democratic) 46.73%
New Hampshire	David H. Goodell	Republican	Retired, Republican victory	Hiram A. Tuttle (Republican) 49.26% Charles H. Amsden (Democratic) 49.15% Josiah M. Fletcher (Prohibition) 1.58% Scattering 0.01% (Legislative election) (Note: Since no candidate received 50% of the vote, the state legislature decided the election. Tuttle was elected.) (held, 7 January 1891); Hiram A. Tuttle, 185 votes Charles H. Amsden, 150 votes
North Dakota	John Miller	Republican	Retired, Republican victory	Andrew H. Burke (Republican) 52.23% William N. Roach (Democratic) 34.55% Walter Muir (Farmers Alliance) 13.22%
Oregon (held, 2 June 1890)	Sylvester Pennoyer	Democratic	Re-elected, 53.55%	David P. Thompson (Republican) 46.45%
Pennsylvania	James A. Beaver	Republican	Term-limited, Democratic victory	Robert E. Pattison (Democratic) 50.00% George W. Delamater (Republican) 48.22% John D. Gill (Prohibition) 1.74% T. P. Rynder (Labor) 0.02% Scattering 0.02%
Rhode Island (held, 2 April 1890)	Herbert W. Ladd	Republican	Defeated, 45.07% (Note: Since no candidate received 50% of the vote, the state legislature decided the election. Davis was elected on May 27.)	John W. Davis (Democratic) 48.77% John H. Larry (Prohibition) 4.32% Arnold B. Chace (Union) 1.78% Scattering 0.05%
South Carolina	John Peter Richardson III	Democratic	Term-limited, Democratic victory	Benjamin Tillman (Democratic) 79.81% A. C. Haskell (Independent Democrat) 20.00% Scattering 0.18%
South Dakota	Arthur C. Mellette	Republican	Re-elected, 44.46%	H. L. Loucks (Independent) 31.71% Maris Taylor (Democratic) 23.83%
Tennessee	Robert Love Taylor	Democratic	Retired, Democratic victory	John P. Buchanan (Democratic) 56.57% Lewis T. Baxter (Republican) 37.91% David C. Kelley (Prohibition) 5.52%
Texas	Lawrence Sullivan Ross	Democratic	Retired, Democratic victory	Jim Hogg (Democratic) 76.45% J. Webster Flanagan (Republican) 22.65% E. C. Heath (Prohibition) 0.72% Scattering 0.18%
Vermont (held, 2 September 1890)	William P. Dillingham	Republican	Retired, Republican victory	Carroll S. Page (Republican) 61.71% Herbert F. Brigham (Democratic) 35.59% Edward L. Allen (Prohibition) 2.14% Scattering 0.56%
Wisconsin	William D. Hoard	Republican	Defeated, 42.71%	George Wilbur Peck (Democratic) 51.86% Charles Alexander (Prohibition) 3.64% Reuben May (Union Labor) 1.76% Scattering 0.03%
Wyoming (held, 11 October 1890)	New state			Francis E. Warren (Republican) 55.38% George W. Baxter (Democratic) 44.62%

== See also ==
- 1890 United States elections

== Bibliography ==
- Glashan, Roy R. (1979). American Governors and Gubernatorial Elections, 1775-1978. Meckler Books. ISBN 0-930466-17-9.
- Gubernatorial Elections, 1787-1997. Washington, D.C.: Congressional Quarterly Inc. 1998. ISBN 1-56802-396-0.
- Dubin, Michael J. (2014). United States Gubernatorial Elections, 1861-1911: The Official Results by State and County. Jefferson, North Carolina: McFarland. ISBN 978-0-7864-4722-0.
- The World Almanac and Bureau of Information, 1891. New York, NY: The Press Publishing Co. 1891.
- McPherson, Edward, ed. (1891). The Tribune Almanac and Political Register for 1891. New York, NY: The Tribune Association.
