= 1888 United States presidential election in Michigan =

- November 6, 1888
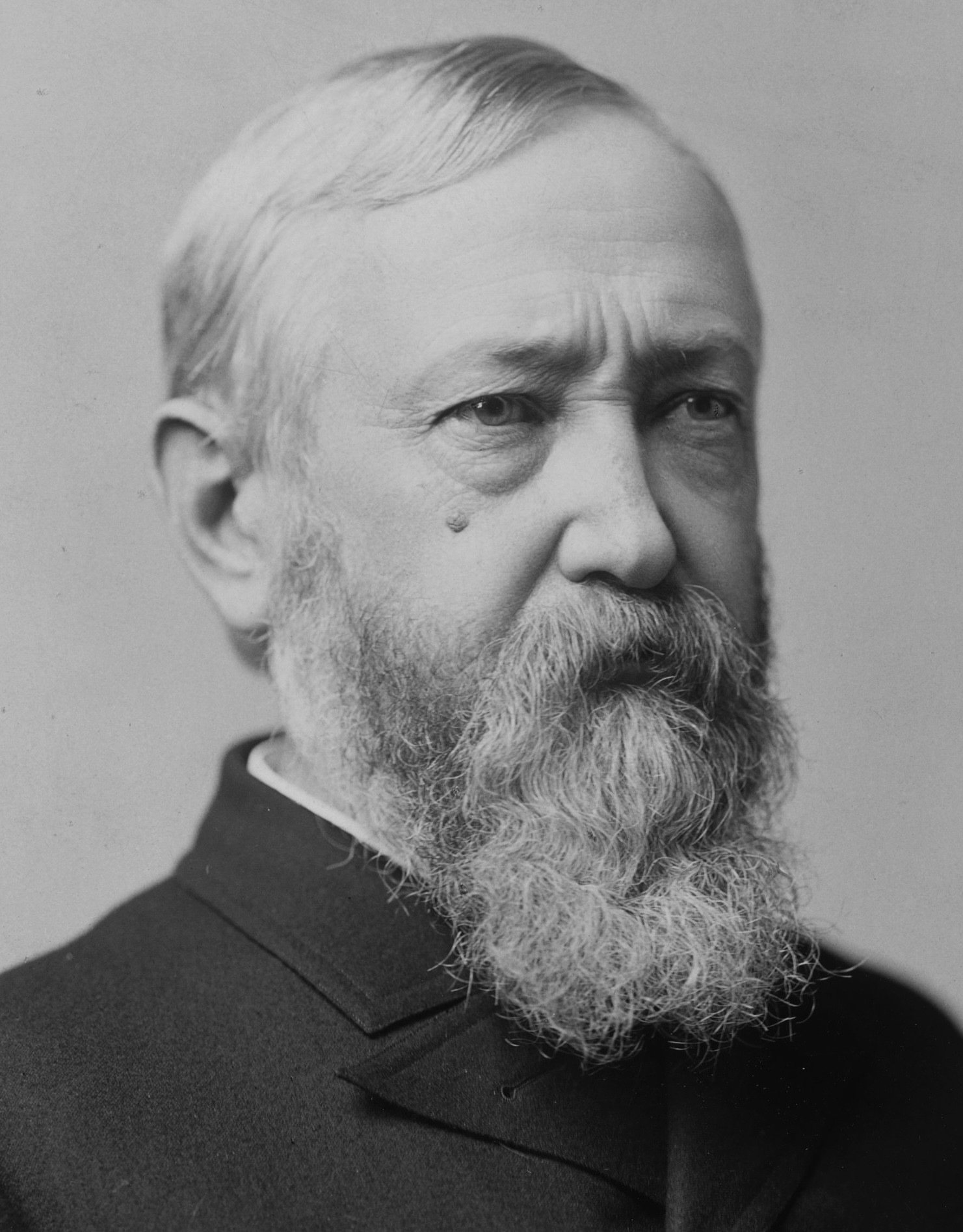

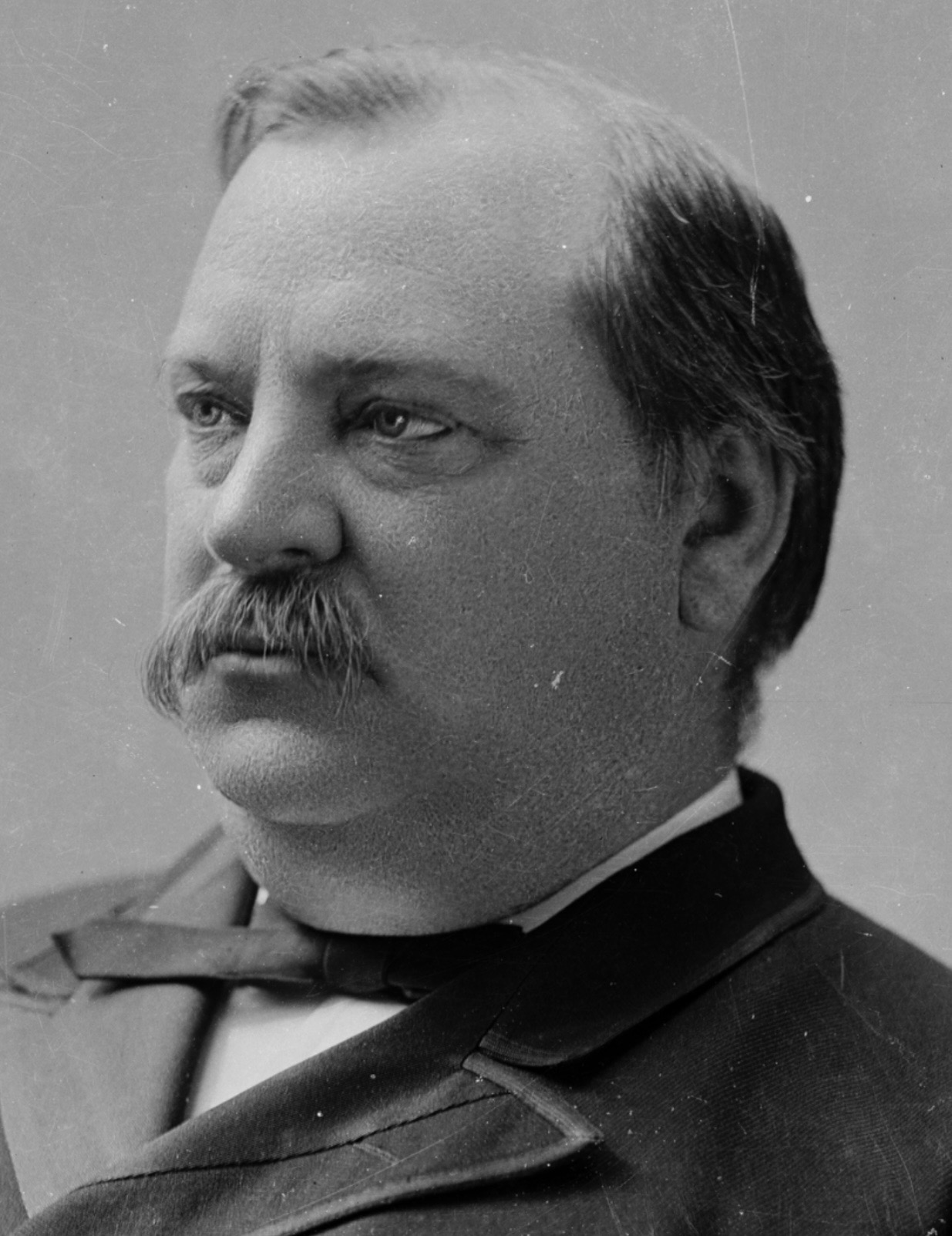
Nominee	Benjamin Harrison	Grover Cleveland
Party	Republican	Democratic
Home state	Indiana	New York
Running mate	Levi P. Morton	Allen G. Thurman
Electoral vote	13	0
Popular vote	236,387	213,469
Percentage	49.73%	44.91%
County results
Harrison
40–50%
50–60%
60–70%
Cleveland
40–50%
50–60%
60–70%
90–100%
Streeter
40–50%
President before election
Grover Cleveland
Democratic
Elected President
Benjamin Harrison
Republican

The 1888 United States presidential election in Michigan took place on November 6, 1888, as part of the 1888 United States presidential election. Voters chose 13 electors to the Electoral College, which selected the president and vice president.

Michigan voted for Republican nominees Benjamin Harrison of Indiana and his running mate Levi P. Morton of New York over Democratic incumbent Grover Cleveland.

== Results ==
General Election Results
Party	Pledged to	Elector	Votes
Republican Party	Benjamin Harrison	Joseph W. French	236,387
Republican Party	Benjamin Harrison	Junius E. Beal	236,386
Republican Party	Benjamin Harrison	Isaac Cappon	236,385
Republican Party	Benjamin Harrison	Perry Hannah	236,383
Republican Party	Benjamin Harrison	Harry P. Merrill	236,383
Republican Party	Benjamin Harrison	Edward Burk	236,382
Republican Party	Benjamin Harrison	Elliot F. Grabilt	236,381
Republican Party	Benjamin Harrison	Don J. Leathers	236,380
Republican Party	Benjamin Harrison	John S. Thompson	236,380
Republican Party	Benjamin Harrison	Richard Kingman	236,378
Republican Party	Benjamin Harrison	James M. Turner	236,373
Republican Party	Benjamin Harrison	Wellington W. Cummer	236,372
Republican Party	Benjamin Harrison	Russell A. Alger	236,370
Democratic Party	Grover Cleveland	Charles H. Dewey	213,469
Democratic Party	Grover Cleveland	S. Dow Elwood	213,469
Democratic Party	Grover Cleveland	Thomas M. Crocker	213,466
Democratic Party	Grover Cleveland	Alva W. Nichols	213,466
Democratic Party	Grover Cleveland	William Killefer	213,462
Democratic Party	Grover Cleveland	William D. Thompson	213,460
Democratic Party	Grover Cleveland	Joseph M. Sterling	213,459
Democratic Party	Grover Cleveland	Josiah W. Begole	213,453
Democratic Party	Grover Cleveland	William McArthur	213,453
Democratic Party	Grover Cleveland	John C. Blanchard	213,450
Democratic Party	Grover Cleveland	George Goodsell	213,450
Democratic Party	Grover Cleveland	William J. Ryan	213,404
Democratic Party	Grover Cleveland	Rokus Kanters	213,307
Prohibition Party	Clinton B. Fisk	Jacob Sagendorph	20,945
Prohibition Party	Clinton B. Fisk	Russell D. May	20,943
Prohibition Party	Clinton B. Fisk	John M. Gordon	20,942
Prohibition Party	Clinton B. Fisk	Carlton H. Mills	20,942
Prohibition Party	Clinton B. Fisk	Arthur D. Power	20,942
Prohibition Party	Clinton B. Fisk	John F. A. Raider	20,942
Prohibition Party	Clinton B. Fisk	Wilson C. Edsell	20,941
Prohibition Party	Clinton B. Fisk	Silas H. Lane	20,941
Prohibition Party	Clinton B. Fisk	Noah W. Cheever	20,934
Prohibition Party	Clinton B. Fisk	Charles Mosher	20,934
Prohibition Party	Clinton B. Fisk	Salmon Steele	20,927
Prohibition Party	Clinton B. Fisk	Thomas Merrill	20,904
Prohibition Party	Clinton B. Fisk	David A. Graham	20,794
Union Labor Party	Alson Streeter	William T. Aniba	4,555
Union Labor Party	Alson Streeter	John Heffron	4,555
Union Labor Party	Alson Streeter	Alonzo B. Allen	4,543
Union Labor Party	Alson Streeter	David Geddes	4,542
Union Labor Party	Alson Streeter	Valentine A. Saph	4,542
Union Labor Party	Alson Streeter	Arthur H. Wells	4,542
Union Labor Party	Alson Streeter	James E. G. Allen	4,541
Union Labor Party	Alson Streeter	Charles Southland	4,540
Union Labor Party	Alson Streeter	George Drury	4,539
Union Labor Party	Alson Streeter	John M. DeWitt	4,514
Union Labor Party	Alson Streeter	Samuel Edison	4,437
Union Labor Party	Alson Streeter	Jeremiah Lamoreaux	4,348
Union Labor Party	Alson Streeter	William Hull	4,331
Votes cast (Note: Based on highest elector on each ticket)			475,356

=== Results by county ===
County	Benjamin Harrison Republican		Grover Cleveland Democratic		Clinton B. Fisk Prohibition		Alson Streeter Union Labor		Margin		Total votes cast
County	#	%	#	%	#	%	#	%	#	%	Total votes cast
Alcona	645	55.60%	502	43.28%	7	0.60%	6	0.52%	143	12.33%	1,160
Alger	284	62.28%	162	35.53%	10	2.19%	0	0.00%	122	26.75%	456
Allegan	5,078	52.01%	3,829	39.22%	721	7.39%	135	1.38%	1,249	12.79%	9,763
Alpena	1,486	47.14%	1,504	47.72%	118	3.74%	44	1.40%	-18	-0.57%	3,152
Antrim	1,305	56.74%	881	38.30%	114	4.96%	0	0.00%	424	18.43%	2,300
Arenac	357	31.85%	261	23.28%	41	3.66%	462	41.21%	-105 (Note: In this county where Streeter finished ahead of both Harrison and Cleveland, margin given is Harrison vote minus Streeter vote and percentage margin Harrison percentage minus Streeter percentage.)	-9.37%	1,121
Baraga	389	48.69%	406	50.81%	4	0.50%	0	0.00%	-17	-2.13%	799
Barry	3,212	49.83%	2,676	41.51%	391	6.07%	167	2.59%	536	8.32%	6,446
Bay	4,378	43.73%	5,386	53.80%	121	1.21%	127	1.27%	-1,008	-10.07%	10,012
Benzie	710	57.58%	412	33.41%	94	7.62%	17	1.38%	298	24.17%	1,233
Berrien	5,128	49.72%	4,689	45.46%	468	4.54%	29	0.28%	439	4.26%	10,314
Branch	4,098	55.36%	2,739	37.00%	503	6.79%	63	0.85%	1,359	18.36%	7,403
Calhoun	5,732	52.77%	4,358	40.12%	613	5.64%	159	1.46%	1,374	12.65%	10,862
Cass	2,929	50.62%	2,564	44.31%	282	4.87%	11	0.19%	365	6.31%	5,786
Charlevoix	1,270	56.70%	874	39.02%	95	4.24%	1	0.04%	396	17.68%	2,240
Cheboygan	1,110	45.66%	1,237	50.88%	76	3.13%	8	0.33%	-127	-5.22%	2,431
Chippewa	1,055	51.56%	909	44.43%	82	4.01%	0	0.00%	146	7.14%	2,046
Clare	905	47.99%	912	48.36%	57	3.02%	12	0.64%	-7	-0.37%	1,886
Clinton	3,493	48.65%	3,248	45.24%	348	4.85%	91	1.27%	245	3.41%	7,180
Crawford	436	47.14%	479	51.78%	9	0.97%	1	0.11%	-43	-4.65%	925
Delta	1,587	54.16%	1,332	45.46%	11	0.38%	0	0.00%	255	8.70%	2,930
Eaton	4,624	52.11%	3,266	36.81%	607	6.84%	376	4.24%	1,358	15.30%	8,873
Emmet	946	44.88%	1,056	50.09%	106	5.03%	0	0.00%	-110	-5.22%	2,108
Genesee	5,404	53.17%	3,904	38.41%	836	8.23%	20	0.20%	1,500	14.76%	10,164
Gladwin	525	58.79%	357	39.98%	9	1.01%	2	0.22%	168	18.81%	893
Gogebic	1,367	54.35%	1,112	44.21%	36	1.43%	0	0.00%	255	10.14%	2,515
Grand Traverse	1,859	63.10%	925	31.40%	154	5.23%	8	0.27%	934	31.70%	2,946
Gratiot	3,667	52.35%	2,854	40.74%	416	5.94%	68	0.97%	813	11.61%	7,005
Hillsdale	4,959	57.00%	3,035	34.89%	566	6.51%	140	1.61%	1,924	22.11%	8,700
Houghton	3,012	51.12%	2,696	45.76%	184	3.12%	0	0.00%	316	5.36%	5,892
Huron	1,608	34.51%	1,988	42.67%	206	4.42%	857	18.39%	-380	-8.16%	4,659
Ingham	4,547	45.71%	4,782	48.07%	507	5.10%	112	1.13%	-235	-2.36%	9,948
Ionia	4,436	50.95%	3,779	43.41%	482	5.54%	9	0.10%	657	7.55%	8,706
Iosco	1,505	45.45%	1,639	49.50%	114	3.44%	53	1.60%	-134	-4.05%	3,311
Iron	598	53.39%	520	46.43%	2	0.18%	0	0.00%	78	6.96%	1,120
Isabella	2,154	51.46%	1,841	43.98%	175	4.18%	16	0.38%	313	7.48%	4,186
Jackson	5,646	48.82%	5,170	44.70%	586	5.07%	164	1.42%	476	4.12%	11,566
Kalamazoo	5,437	54.66%	3,950	39.71%	522	5.25%	38	0.38%	1,487	14.95%	9,947
Kalkaska	798	62.34%	400	31.25%	77	6.02%	5	0.39%	398	31.09%	1,280
Kent	12,811	49.41%	11,864	45.76%	1,252	4.83%	2	0.01%	947	3.65%	25,929
Keweenaw	411	68.50%	185	30.83%	4	0.67%	0	0.00%	226	37.67%	600
Lake	1,061	54.24%	807	41.26%	86	4.40%	2	0.10%	254	12.99%	1,956
Lapeer	3,662	53.36%	2,914	42.46%	262	3.82%	25	0.36%	748	10.90%	6,863
Leelanau	899	55.49%	673	41.54%	48	2.96%	0	0.00%	226	13.95%	1,620
Lenawee	6,475	49.49%	5,671	43.35%	916	7.00%	21	0.16%	804	6.15%	13,083
Livingston	2,706	44.99%	2,842	47.25%	348	5.79%	119	1.98%	-136	-2.26%	6,015
Luce	212	53.54%	172	43.43%	12	3.03%	0	0.00%	40	10.10%	396
Mackinac	625	40.24%	913	58.79%	15	0.97%	0	0.00%	-288	-18.54%	1,553
Macomb	3,245	45.24%	3,708	51.69%	217	3.03%	3	0.04%	-463	-6.45%	7,173
Manistee	1,668	39.23%	2,328	54.75%	212	4.99%	44	1.03%	-660	-15.52%	4,252
Manitou	3	2.08%	141	97.92%	0	0.00%	0	0.00%	-138	-95.83%	144
Marquette	4,512	65.76%	2,105	30.68%	244	3.56%	0	0.00%	2,407	35.08%	6,861
Mason	1,697	50.79%	1,573	47.08%	67	2.01%	4	0.12%	124	3.71%	3,341
Mecosta	2,604	54.94%	1,793	37.83%	333	7.03%	10	0.21%	811	17.11%	4,740
Menominee	3,156	57.09%	2,228	40.30%	96	1.74%	48	0.87%	928	16.79%	5,528
Midland	1,336	49.59%	1,148	42.61%	127	4.71%	83	3.08%	188	6.98%	2,694
Missaukee	632	50.44%	572	45.65%	47	3.75%	2	0.16%	60	4.79%	1,253
Monroe	3,430	45.33%	3,940	52.07%	182	2.41%	15	0.20%	-510	-6.74%	7,567
Montcalm	4,480	53.38%	3,495	41.64%	372	4.43%	46	0.55%	985	11.74%	8,393
Montmorency	235	48.86%	237	49.27%	9	1.87%	0	0.00%	-2	-0.42%	481
Muskegon	4,521	52.44%	3,514	40.76%	396	4.59%	191	2.22%	1,007	11.68%	8,622
Newaygo	2,448	51.85%	1,932	40.92%	241	5.10%	100	2.12%	516	10.93%	4,721
Oakland	5,389	47.31%	5,410	47.50%	589	5.17%	2	0.02%	-21	-0.18%	11,390
Oceana	1,726	47.82%	1,426	39.51%	434	12.03%	23	0.64%	300	8.31%	3,609
Ogemaw	620	48.44%	579	45.23%	32	2.50%	49	3.83%	41	3.20%	1,280
Ontonagon	308	36.15%	542	63.62%	2	0.23%	0	0.00%	-234	-27.46%	852
Osceola	1,882	57.01%	1,090	33.02%	320	9.69%	9	0.27%	792	23.99%	3,301
Oscoda	277	47.19%	299	50.94%	11	1.87%	0	0.00%	-22	-3.75%	587
Otsego	573	52.81%	434	40.00%	64	5.90%	14	1.29%	139	12.81%	1,085
Ottawa	4,302	55.03%	3,191	40.82%	268	3.43%	57	0.73%	1,111	14.21%	7,818
Presque Isle	408	45.18%	484	53.60%	11	1.22%	0	0.00%	-76	-8.42%	903
Roscommon	360	50.00%	358	49.72%	1	0.14%	1	0.14%	2	0.28%	720
Saginaw	6,723	41.95%	8,923	55.68%	325	2.03%	54	0.34%	-2,200	-13.73%	16,025
Sanilac	2,940	51.66%	2,434	42.77%	245	4.31%	72	1.27%	506	8.89%	5,691
Schoolcraft	590	47.81%	589	47.73%	55	4.46%	0	0.00%	1	0.08%	1,234
Shiawassee	4,007	51.91%	3,187	41.29%	513	6.65%	12	0.16%	820	10.62%	7,719
St. Clair	5,419	49.04%	5,286	47.83%	326	2.95%	20	0.18%	133	1.20%	11,051
St. Joseph	3,372	48.36%	3,217	46.14%	180	2.58%	203	2.91%	155	2.22%	6,972
Tuscola	3,888	52.78%	3,112	42.24%	295	4.00%	72	0.98%	776	10.53%	7,367
Van Buren	4,783	58.05%	2,986	36.24%	458	5.56%	13	0.16%	1,797	21.81%	8,240
Washtenaw	4,549	42.96%	5,482	51.78%	543	5.13%	14	0.13%	-933	-8.81%	10,588
Wayne	21,326	44.23%	25,986	53.90%	877	1.82%	23	0.05%	-4,660	-9.67%	48,212
Wexford	1,437	53.96%	1,065	39.99%	160	6.01%	1	0.04%	372	13.97%	2,663
Totals	236,387	49.73%	213,469	44.91%	20,945	4.41%	4,555	0.96%	22,918	4.82%	475,356

==== Counties that flipped from Democratic to Republican ====
- Barry
- Berrien
- Clinton
- Gratiot
- Ionia
- Jackson
- Kent
- Newaygo
- Roscommon
- Shiawassee
- St. Clair
- St. Joseph

==== Counties that flipped from Republican to Democratic ====
- Baraga
- Crawford
- Iosco
- Ontonagon
- Oscoda
- Presque Isle

==== Counties that flipped from Democratic to Union Labor ====
- Arenac

== See also ==
- United States presidential elections in Michigan
