= 1876 Prohibition National Convention =

American political convention

- 1876 presidential election
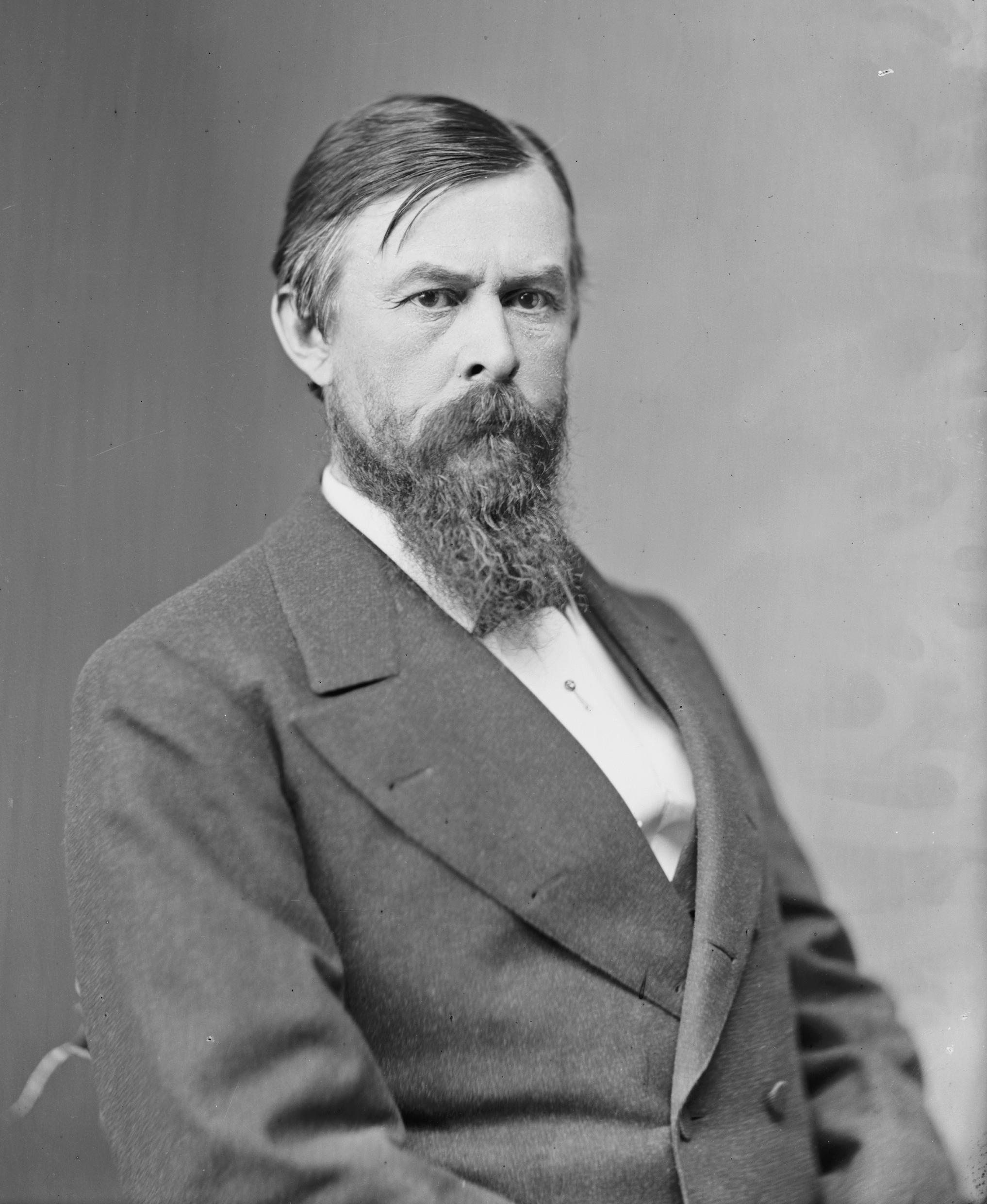
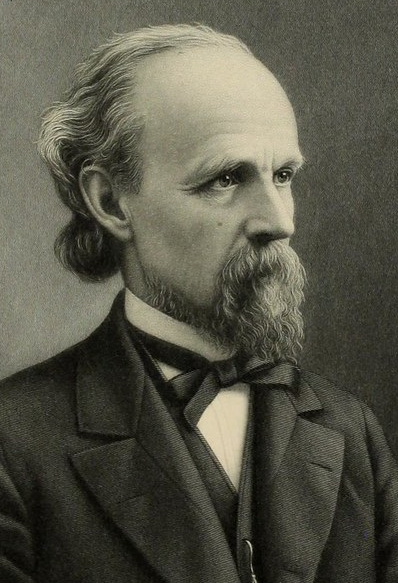
- Nominees; Smith and Stewart

Convention
- Date(s): May 17, 1876
- City: Cleveland, Ohio
- Venue: Halle's Hall

Candidates
- Presidential nominee: Green Clay Smith of Washington, D.C.
- Vice-presidential nominee: Gideon T. Stewart of Ohio

The 1876 Prohibition National Convention was a presidential nominating convention held at Halle's Hall, in Cleveland, Ohio on May 17, 1876, to select the Prohibition Party's presidential ticket for the 1876 presidential election.

== Presidential nomination ==
On May 17, 1876, the national convention was called to open by party Secretary John Russell due to the absence of Chairman Simeon B. Chase and was attended by 150 delegates, which one source describes as "not largely attended". Green Clay Smith, the former Territorial Governor of Montana, was selected to serve as the temporary chairman of the convention. James H. Raper, a representative from the United Kingdom Alliance, gave a speech at the convention.

On the first ballot a variety of candidates split the 70 votes cast including Green Clay Smith with 28 votes, former presidential nominee James Black with 12, former vice presidential nominee John Russell with 8, R. A. Brown with 7, former New York Governor Myron H. Clark with 5, Gideon T. Stewart with 3, James G. Blaine with 2, and five others received a single vote each: former Portland Mayor Neal Dow, abolitionist and advocate for Native Americans Wendell Phillips, S. Merritt, W. D. Dodge and R. M. Foust. On the second ballot, Smith received a majority of 46 votes and was nominated as the party's presidential candidate. Stewart was selected to be the vice presidential nominee.

== Platform ==
The platform drafted by the Platform Committee gave support to alcoholic prohibition in Washington, D.C., territories, and every state, equal suffrage and office eligibility regardless of race and gender, free public education, direct election of the president, vice president, and senators, increasing immigration, decreasing governmental salaries, and opposition to the death penalty, gambling, and lotteries. The delegates also voted to reaffirm their support for the party's platform which was created at the national convention during the 1872 presidential election.

== See also ==
- 1876 Republican National Convention
- 1876 Democratic National Convention
- 1876 Greenback National Convention
