= 1892 Michigan gubernatorial election =

- November 8, 1892
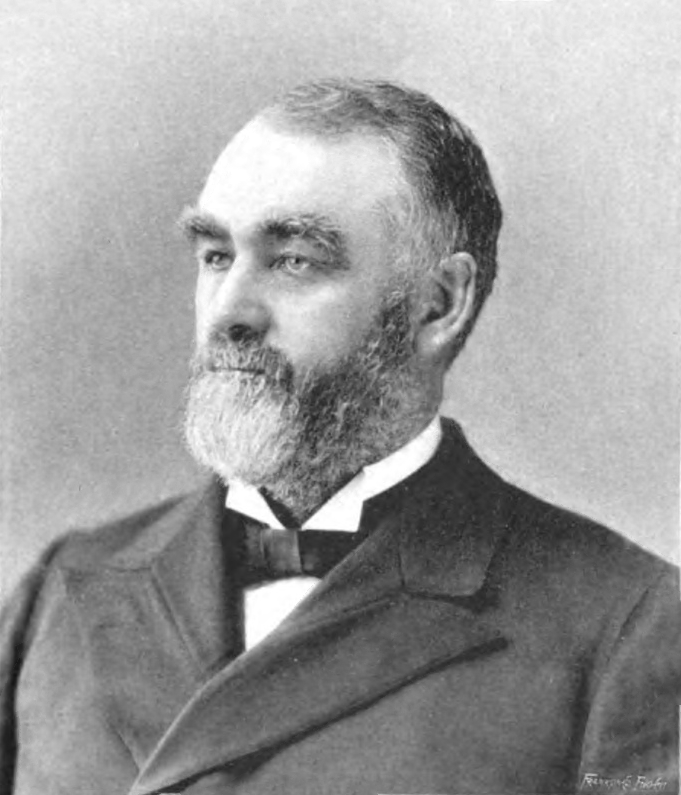

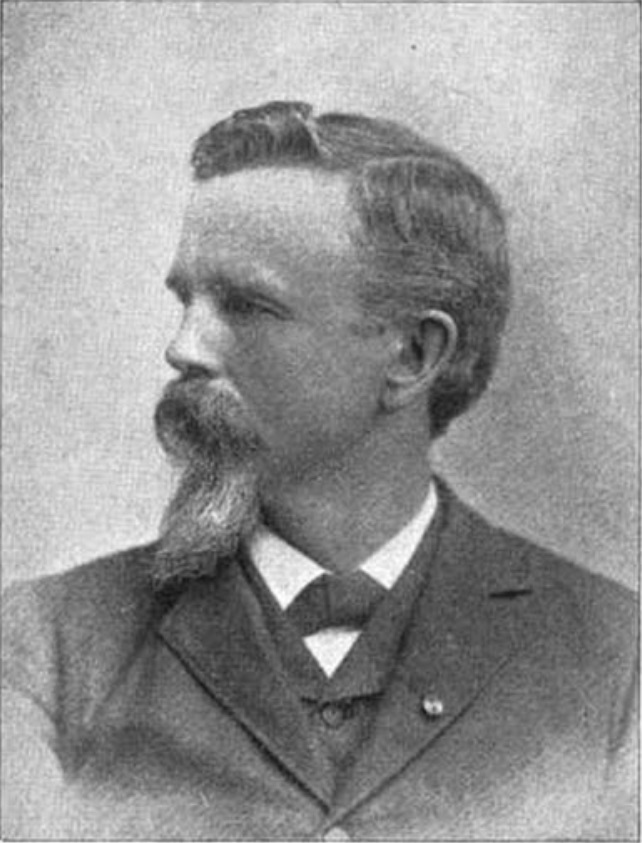
Nominee	John T. Rich	Allen B. Morse
Party	Republican	Democratic
Popular vote	221,228	205,138
Percentage	47.21%	43.77%
- County results Rich: 40–50% 50–60% 60–70% Morse: 40–50% 50–60% 60–70% Ewing: 30–40%
Governor before election
Edwin B. Winans
Democratic
Elected Governor
John T. Rich
Republican

The 1892 Michigan gubernatorial election was held on November 8, 1892. Republican nominee John T. Rich defeated Democratic candidate Allen B. Morse with 47.21% of the vote.

== General election ==
=== Candidates ===
Major party candidates

- John T. Rich, Republican
- Allen B. Morse, Democratic

Other candidates

- John W. Ewing, People's
- John Russell, Prohibition

=== Results ===
1892 Michigan gubernatorial election
Party	Candidate	Votes	%	±%
Republican	John T. Rich	221,228	47.21%	+3.92%
Democratic	Allen B. Morse	205,138	43.77%	−2.41%
Populist	John W. Ewing	21,417	4.57%	
Prohibition	John Russell	20,777	4.43%	−2.78%
	Blank	64	0.01%	
	Scattering	13	0.00%	
Plurality		16,090	3.43%	
Total votes		468,637	100.00%	
Republican gain from Democratic		Swing	+6.33%	

==== Results by county ====
After this election, Huron County would not vote Democratic again until 1986.

County	John T. Rich Republican		Allen B. Morse Democratic		John W. Ewing Populist		John Russell Prohibition		Margin		Total votes cast
County	#	%	#	%	#	%	#	%	#	%	Total votes cast
Alcona	559	57.04%	388	39.59%	4	0.41%	29	2.96%	171	17.45%	980
Alger	161	49.85%	160	49.54%	0	0.00%	2	0.62%	1	0.31%	323
Allegan	4,230	50.80%	3,211	38.56%	349	4.19%	537	6.45%	1,019	12.24%	8,327
Alpena	1,535	48.79%	1,545	49.11%	19	0.60%	47	1.49%	-10	-0.32%	3,146
Antrim	1,155	52.29%	826	37.39%	61	2.76%	167	7.56%	329	14.86%	2,209
Arenac	310	26.91%	383	33.25%	432	37.50%	27	2.34%	-49 (Note: Ewing's margin over Morse)	-4.25%	1,152
Baraga	369	36.07%	638	62.37%	4	0.39%	12	1.17%	-269	-26.30%	1,023
Barry	2,861	48.89%	1,894	32.37%	796	13.60%	301	5.14%	967	16.52%	5,852
Bay	4,562	42.56%	5,783	53.95%	181	1.69%	194	1.81%	-1,221	-11.39%	10,720
Benzie	783	52.48%	505	33.85%	105	7.04%	99	6.64%	278	18.63%	1,492
Berrien	5,093	48.38%	4,863	46.20%	133	1.26%	438	4.16%	230	2.18%	10,527
Branch	3,270	49.44%	2,245	33.94%	674	10.19%	425	6.43%	1,025	15.50%	6,614
Calhoun	5,077	47.95%	4,214	39.80%	606	5.72%	691	6.53%	863	8.15%	10,588
Cass	2,744	47.68%	2,454	42.64%	381	6.62%	176	3.06%	290	5.04%	5,755
Charlevoix	1,091	52.55%	700	33.72%	149	7.18%	136	6.55%	391	18.83%	2,076
Cheboygan	1,085	43.66%	1,251	50.34%	77	3.10%	72	2.90%	-166	-6.68%	2,485
Chippewa	1,234	52.05%	1,083	45.68%	18	0.76%	36	1.52%	151	6.37%	2,371
Clare	712	41.35%	826	47.97%	18	1.05%	166	9.64%	-114	-6.62%	1,722
Clinton	3,131	48.21%	2,790	42.96%	316	4.87%	258	3.97%	341	5.25%	6,495
Crawford	301	48.71%	306	49.51%	8	1.29%	3	0.49%	-5	-0.81%	618
Delta	1,783	54.23%	1,426	43.37%	40	1.22%	39	1.19%	357	10.86%	3,288
Dickinson	1,623	50.85%	1,277	40.01%	33	1.03%	259	8.11%	346	10.84%	3,192
Eaton	3,771	47.90%	2,875	36.52%	738	9.38%	488	6.20%	896	11.38%	7,872
Emmet	1,018	46.19%	1,068	48.46%	16	0.73%	102	4.63%	-50	-2.27%	2,204
Genesee	4,823	50.30%	3,743	39.03%	440	4.59%	583	6.08%	1,080	11.26%	9,589
Gladwin	533	60.50%	331	37.57%	4	0.45%	13	1.48%	202	22.93%	881
Gogebic	2,346	57.02%	1,633	39.69%	19	0.46%	116	2.82%	713	17.33%	4,114
Grand Traverse	1,738	54.60%	942	29.59%	315	9.90%	188	5.91%	796	25.01%	3,183
Gratiot	3,028	48.52%	1,733	27.77%	1,229	19.69%	251	4.02%	1,295	20.75%	6,241
Hillsdale	4,118	53.40%	2,659	34.48%	452	5.86%	483	6.26%	1,459	18.92%	7,712
Houghton	3,321	45.62%	2,639	36.25%	745	10.23%	574	7.89%	682	9.37%	7,279
Huron	1,699	35.23%	2,243	46.52%	703	14.58%	177	3.67%	-544	-11.28%	4,822
Ingham	4,336	43.85%	4,128	41.75%	930	9.41%	494	5.00%	208	2.10%	9,888
Ionia	4,087	47.24%	4,080	47.16%	144	1.66%	340	3.93%	7	0.08%	8,652 (Note: Includes 1 Scattering vote)
Iosco	1,399	49.49%	1,348	47.68%	23	0.81%	57	2.02%	51	1.80%	2,827
Iron	909	58.87%	589	38.15%	16	1.04%	30	1.94%	320	20.73%	1,544
Isabella	1,878	45.44%	1,785	43.19%	322	7.79%	148	3.58%	93	2.25%	4,133
Jackson	5,111	44.64%	5,106	44.59%	665	5.81%	568	4.96%	5	0.04%	11,450
Kalamazoo	4,973	50.29%	4,088	41.34%	386	3.90%	442	4.47%	885	8.95%	9,889
Kalkaska	711	58.96%	397	32.92%	37	3.07%	61	5.06%	314	26.04%	1,206
Kent	12,136	45.74%	11,693	44.07%	1,327	5.00%	1,375	5.18%	443	1.67%	26,531
Keweenaw	400	65.25%	203	33.12%	5	0.82%	5	0.82%	197	32.14%	613
Lake	655	47.60%	623	45.28%	35	2.54%	63	4.58%	32	2.33%	1,376
Lapeer	3,131	49.15%	2,727	42.81%	211	3.31%	301	4.73%	404	6.34%	6,370
Leelanau	777	53.70%	498	34.42%	128	8.85%	44	3.04%	279	19.28%	1,447
Lenawee	5,829	46.81%	5,594	44.92%	113	0.91%	917	7.36%	235	1.89%	12,453
Livingston	2,444	43.66%	2,401	42.89%	387	6.91%	366	6.54%	43	0.77%	5,598
Luce	236	55.79%	159	37.59%	3	0.71%	25	5.91%	77	18.20%	423
Mackinac	476	35.08%	863	63.60%	8	0.59%	10	0.74%	-387	-28.52%	1,357
Macomb	2,768	41.09%	3,622	53.77%	57	0.85%	289	4.29%	-854	-12.68%	6,736
Manistee	1,481	35.30%	2,322	55.34%	161	3.84%	232	5.53%	-841	-20.04%	4,196
Manitou	4	2.72%	143	97.28%	0	0.00%	0	0.00%	-139	-94.56%	147
Marquette	3,878	52.99%	2,858	39.05%	45	0.61%	538	7.35%	1,020	13.94%	7,319
Mason	1,436	45.60%	1,408	44.71%	43	1.37%	262	8.32%	28	0.89%	3,149
Mecosta	1,958	51.61%	1,497	39.46%	123	3.24%	216	5.69%	461	12.15%	3,794
Menominee	1,870	48.30%	1,821	47.03%	40	1.03%	141	3.64%	49	1.27%	3,872
Midland	1,069	46.26%	837	36.22%	290	12.55%	115	4.98%	232	10.04%	2,311
Missaukee	663	48.04%	634	45.94%	21	1.52%	62	4.49%	29	2.10%	1,380
Monroe	2,910	41.32%	3,790	53.81%	103	1.46%	240	3.41%	-880	-12.49%	7,043
Montcalm	3,612	52.87%	2,296	33.61%	663	9.70%	261	3.82%	1,316	19.26%	6,832
Montmorency	250	47.62%	259	49.33%	6	1.14%	10	1.90%	-9	-1.71%	525
Muskegon	3,824	49.39%	3,361	43.41%	241	3.11%	316	4.08%	463	5.98%	7,742
Newaygo	2,079	50.57%	1,559	37.92%	191	4.65%	282	6.86%	520	12.65%	4,111
Oakland	4,769	44.88%	4,962	46.70%	173	1.63%	722	6.79%	-193	-1.82%	10,626
Oceana	1,636	47.20%	1,433	41.34%	88	2.54%	309	8.92%	203	5.86%	3,466
Ogemaw	594	50.38%	521	44.19%	39	3.31%	25	2.12%	73	6.19%	1,179
Ontonagon	685	38.74%	1,050	59.39%	13	0.74%	20	1.13%	-365	-20.64%	1,768
Osceola	1,598	50.76%	1,113	35.36%	136	4.32%	301	9.56%	485	15.41%	3,148
Oscoda	2722	58.87%	181	39.18%	4	0.87%	5	1.08%	91	19.70%	462
Otsego	517	46.91%	540	49.00%	14	1.27%	31	2.81%	-23	-2.09%	1,102
Ottawa	3,598	50.60%	3,027	42.57%	315	4.43%	171	2.40%	571	8.03%	7,111
Presque Isle	300	35.63%	518	61.52%	5	0.59%	7	0.83%	-218	-25.89%	842 (Note: Includes 12 Scattering votes)
Roscommon	239	44.26%	286	52.96%	6	1.11%	9	1.67%	-47	-8.70%	540
Saginaw	6,666	43.76%	7,691	50.49%	593	3.89%	284	1.86%	-1,025	-6.73%	15,234
Sanilac	2,500	47.05%	1,744	32.82%	773	14.55%	297	5.59%	756	14.23%	5,314
Schoolcraft	574	42.21%	645	47.43%	40	2.94%	101	7.43%	-71	-5.22%	1,360
Shiawassee	3,615	47.51%	3,035	39.89%	282	3.71%	677	8.90%	580	7.62%	7,609
St. Clair	5,340	48.43%	5,320	48.25%	72	0.65%	231	2.09%	20	0.18%	11,027 (Note: Includes 64 Blank votes)
St. Joseph	2,816	43.67%	2,483	38.50%	961	14.90%	189	2.93%	333	5.16%	6,449
Tuscola	3,191	48.66%	2,086	31.81%	890	13.57%	391	5.96%	1,105	16.85%	6,558
Van Buren	3,788	53.77%	2,225	31.58%	621	8.81%	411	5.83%	1,563	22.19%	7,045
Washtenaw	4,326	41.78%	5,515	53.26%	65	0.63%	449	4.34%	-1,189	-11.48%	10,355
Wayne	25,459	46.38%	28,278	51.52%	486	0.89%	665	1.21%	-2,819	-5.14%	54,888
Wexford	1,391	49.89%	1,162	41.68%	52	1.87%	183	6.56%	229	8.21%	2,788
Total	221,228	47.21%	205,138	43.77%	21,417	4.57%	20,777	4.43%	16,090	3.43%	468,637

===== Counties that flipped from Democratic to Republican =====
- Berrien
- Clinton
- Delta
- Genesee
- Ingham
- Ionia
- Iron
- Jackson
- Kent
- Lenawee
- Livingston
- Mason
- Missaukee
- Muskegon
- Oceana
- Ogemaw
- Osceola
- Ottawa
- Shiawassee
- St. Clair

===== Counties that flipped from Republican to Democratic =====
- Montmorency
- Otsego

===== Counties that flipped from Democratic to Populist =====
- Arenac
