= 1892 Georgia gubernatorial election =

- October 5, 1892
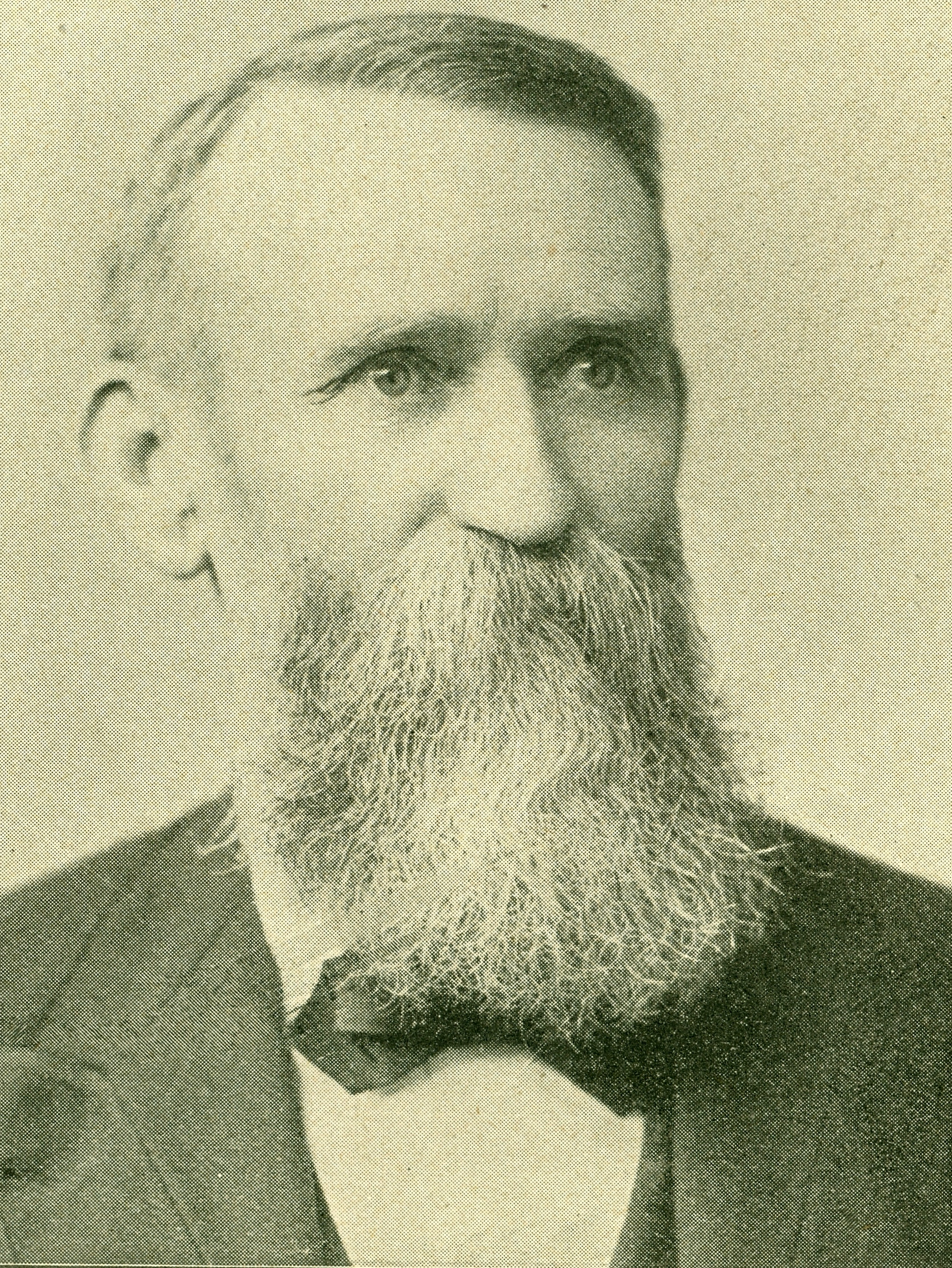

Nominee	William J. Northen	W. L. Peck
Party	Democratic	Populist
Popular vote	136,543	68,093
Percentage	66.65%	33.24%
- Results by County: Northen: 50–60% 60–70% 70–80% 80–90% >90% Peck: 50–60% 60–70% 70–80% Scattering: 50–60%
Governor before election
William J. Northen
Democratic
Elected Governor
William J. Northen
Democratic

The 1892 Georgia gubernatorial election was held on October 5, 1892, in order to elect the Governor of Georgia. Democratic nominee and incumbent Governor William J. Northen defeated People's Party nominee W. L. Peck.

== General election ==
On election day, October 5, 1892, Democratic nominee William J. Northen won re-election with a margin of 68,450 votes against his opponent People's Party nominee W. L. Peck, thereby holding Democratic control over the office of Governor. Northen was sworn in for his second term on October 27, 1892.

=== Results ===
Georgia gubernatorial election, 1892
Party	Candidate	Votes	%
Democratic	William J. Northen (incumbent)	136,543	66.65
Populist	W. L. Peck	68,093	33.24
	Scattering	242	0.11
Total votes		204,878	100.00
Democratic hold			
