= 1888 Arkansas gubernatorial election =

- September 3, 1888
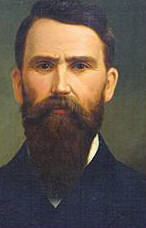

Nominee	James Philip Eagle	Charles M. Norwood
Party	Democratic	Union Labor
Alliance		Republican
Popular vote	99,229	84,223
Percentage	54.09%	45.91%
- County results Eagle: 50–60% 60–70% 70–80% 80–90% Norwood: 50–60% 60–70% 70–80% 80–90%
Governor before election
Simon Pollard Hughes Jr.
Democratic
Elected Governor
James Philip Eagle
Democratic

The 1888 Arkansas gubernatorial election was held on September 3, 1888.

Incumbent Democratic Governor Simon Pollard Hughes Jr. was defeated for re-nomination.

Democratic nominee James Philip Eagle defeated Union Labor and Republican fusion nominee Charles M. Norwood with 54.09% of the vote.

== General election ==
=== Candidates ===
- James Philip Eagle, Democratic, farmer, former Speaker of the Arkansas House of Representatives, president of the Arkansas Baptist State Convention
- Charles M. Norwood, Union Labor, former Confederate soldier and State Senator

The Republican Party endorsed Norwood.

=== Results ===
1888 Arkansas gubernatorial election (Note: Some sources give Norwood's vote as 84,273.)
Party	Candidate	Votes	%	±%
Democratic	James Philip Eagle	99,229	54.09%	−1.22%
Union Labor	Charles M. Norwood	84,223	45.91%	N/A
Majority		15,006	8.18%	
Turnout		183,452		
Democratic hold		Swing		
