= Eugene H. Belden =

American politician

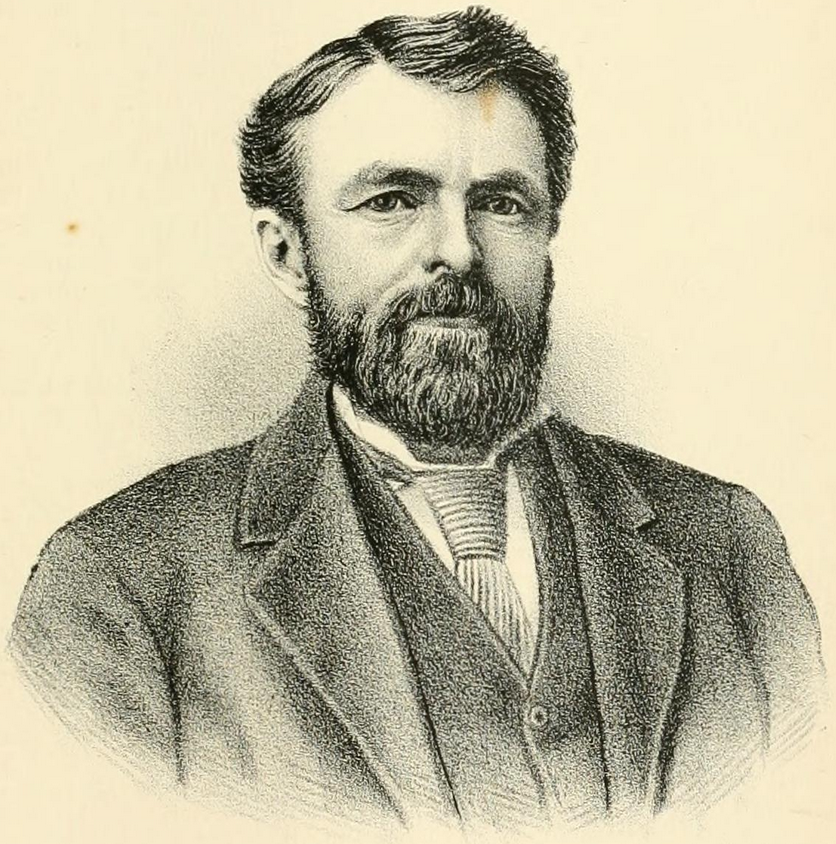

Member of the Michigan House of Representatives from the Jackson County 3rd district
- In office 1881–1882
- Preceded by: Sylvester A. Strong

Personal details
- Born: December 14, 1840 Spring Arbor, Michigan, U.S.
- Died: January 6, 1910 (aged 69) Jackson County, Michigan, U.S.
- Party: Populist
- Other political affiliations: Republican; Industrial (1890)
- Education: Michigan Central College

Eugene H. Belden (December 14, 1840 – January 6, 1910) was an American politician.

== Biography ==
Eugene H. Belden was born in Spring Arbor, Michigan on December 14, 1840. After attending lower-level schools, he began attending Michigan Central College at age 15. At age 20, he started attending the law department of the University of Michigan. He also studied law in the office of Governor Austin Blair. Belden did not graduate from the University of Michigan, and he never practiced law, instead getting involved with farming and real estate. He had also served as justice of the peace and public notary.

In 1880, Belden was elected as a Republican to the Michigan House of Representatives, representing Jackson County's 3rd district. He served one term. In September 1884, Belden was nominated at the Jackson County Republican convention for the state senate. He was defeated when running for the 7th district seat by Michael Shoemaker.

In 1890, Belden attended the founding convention of the Industrial Party. The Industrial Party was a fusion of groups including the Greenback Party, the Knights of Labor, and the Farmers' Alliance. By this time, Belden was a member of the Farmers' Alliance. Belden was nominated for governor by the new party. He received 13,198 votes in the 1890 general election.

In August 1891, Belden was appointed by Governor Edwin B. Winans to serve on Michigan's World's Fair commission. He served as vice president of the commission.

In December 1891, Belden attended the first convention of the People's Party of Michigan. He became chairman of the state executive committee. In August 1892, he was nominated for the United States Senate by the Populists. In January 1893, Belden received five votes for U.S. senator from the Michigan Legislature. The Populists again nominated Belden for U.S. senator in July 1894.

On January 6, 1910, Belden died after six months of illness. He was a widower by the time of his death.
