= Thomas and Anna Morrissey House =

- U.S. National Register of Historic Places
- Michigan State Historic Site
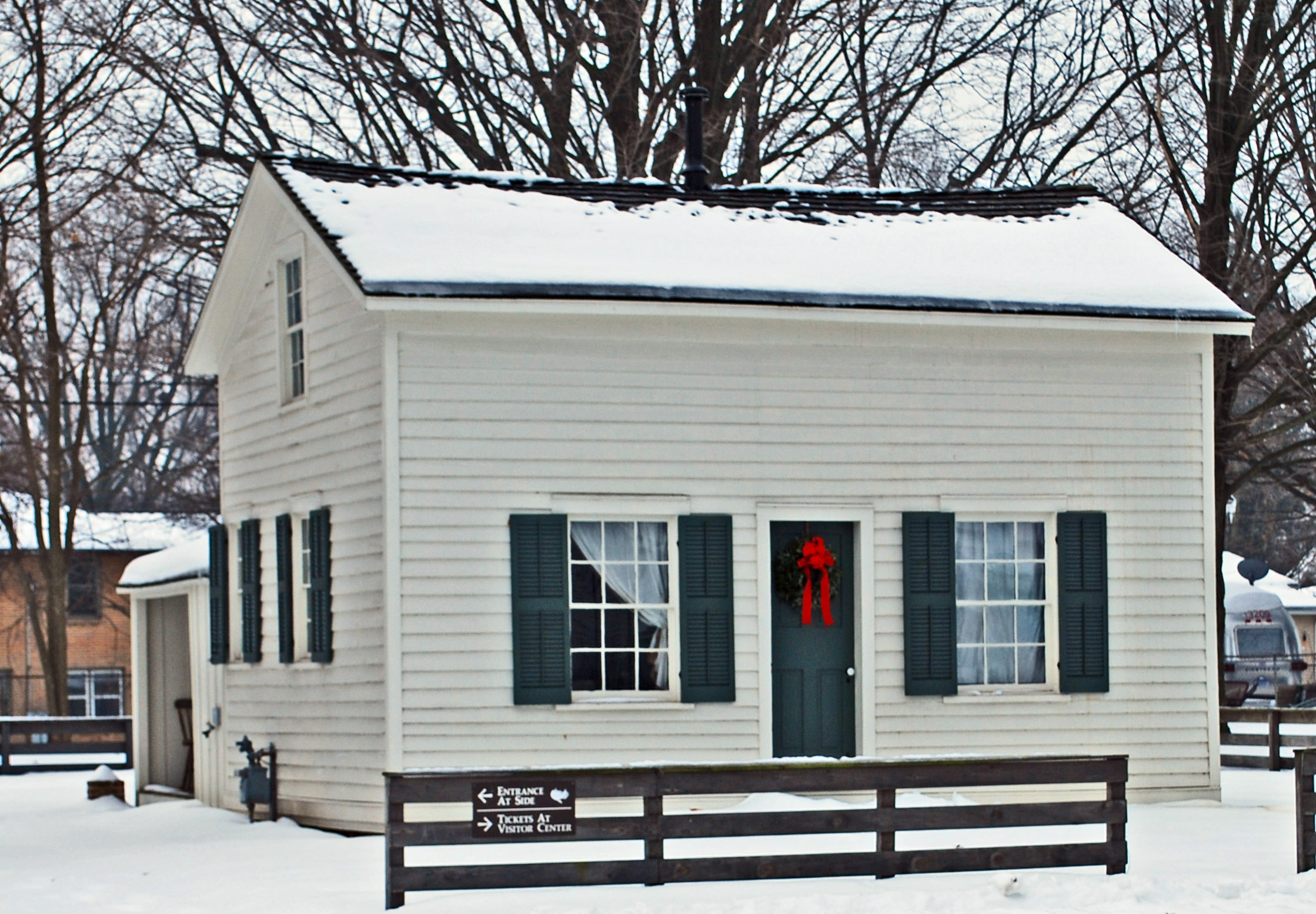

- Location within Michigan Location within the United States
- Interactive map
- Location: 190 W. 9th St., Holland, Michigan
- Coordinates: 42°47′21″N 86°6′58″W
- Area: less than one acre
- Built: 1867
- Architectural style: Hall and parlor
- NRHP reference No.: 99000337
- Added to NRHP: March 29, 1999

The Thomas and Anna Morrissey House was built as a private house, located at 190 West 9th Street in Holland, Michigan. It was listed on the National Register of Historic Places in 1999. It is one of the few houses in the area still standing that survived the disastrous 1871 forest fire that decimated Holland. The house has been restored to how it would have appeared in 1871, and is operated by the Holland Museum as the Settlers House Museum.

== History ==
Holland was first settled by Dutch immigrants who arrived in 1847, led by Rev. Albertus C. Van Raalte. Van Raalte platted the "West Addition," where this house is located, in 1867. Although the construction date of this house is not recorded, beginning in 1867, ship's carpenter Thomas Morrissey and his wife Anna paid taxes on this lot at a rate suggesting that this house existed at the time. However, they did not actually purchase the lot until 1870.

The Morriseys sold the house in 1870 to Hermanus Boone, and moved to Saugatuck, Michigan, where Thomas died the following year. Boone likely did not live in the house, but rather rented it out. In 1873 Boone sold the house to David and Hermina Dangremond Bertsch. Bertsch worked at the tannery owned by his brother John and Isaac Cappon, whose own house is nearby. The Bertsches lived in the house until 1880. The house was sold multiple times over the next ten years; later owners included fire insurance agent Hermanus Dangremond and his wife Emma, bookseller/stationer Leendert Kanters and his wife Minnie, Heinrich and Annie Eigner, and Nancy Charter. The Charter family owned the house from 1890 to 1952, renting it out to various tenants.

Stephen and Margearet Boneburg purchased the property in 1952, and lived until Margearet Boneburg died in 1996. The city of Holland purchased the house in 1996 with the intent of restoring it to be a historic house museum. The house is now open seasonally from mid-May through September, along with the nearby Isaac Cappon House.

== Description ==
The Morrissey House is a one-and-one-half-story balloon frame side-gable hall and parlor house with a lean-to addition in the rear. The house has clapboarded walls, plain corner boards, and raking cornices without returns. The front facade has a center entrance flanked by square-head six-over-six windows with board frames. The original portion of the house measures 24 by 15 feet; the addition nearly doubles the house's depth. Most of the house is supported by brick piers, but a small section has a dirt-floored cellar underneath.

On the interior, the original section contains a main room and bedroom. An enclosed staircase access the upper floor. The addition contains a kitchen and pantry.
