= 1890 Wisconsin lieutenant gubernatorial election =

- November 4, 1890
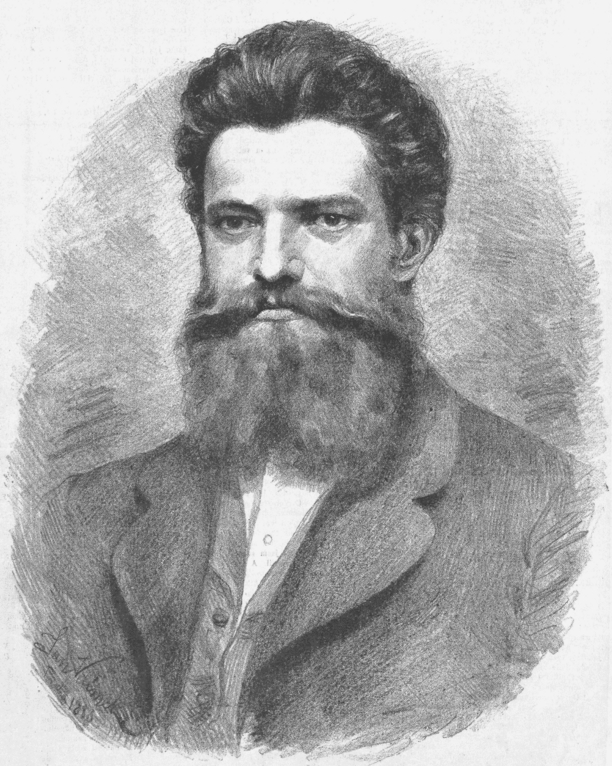

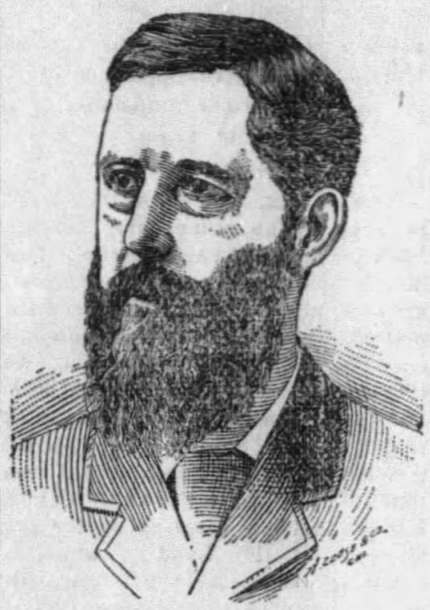
| Nominee | Charles Jonas | Joseph B. Treat |
| Party | Democratic | Republican |
| Popular vote | 159,710 | 124,736 |
| Percentage | 52.37% | 40.90% |
Lieutenant Governor before election
George Washington Ryland
Republican
Elected Lieutenant Governor
Charles Jonas
Democratic

The 1890 Wisconsin lieutenant gubernatorial election was held on November 4, 1890, in order to elect the lieutenant governor of Wisconsin. Democratic nominee and former member of the Wisconsin Senate Charles Jonas defeated Republican nominee and fellow former member of the Wisconsin Senate Joseph B. Treat, Prohibition nominee William R. Nethercut and Union Labor nominee Nelson E. Allen.

== General election ==
On election day, November 4, 1890, Democratic nominee Charles Jonas won the election by a margin of 34,974 votes against his foremost opponent Republican nominee Joseph B. Treat, thereby gaining Democratic control over the office of lieutenant governor. Jonas was sworn in as the 16th lieutenant governor of Wisconsin on January 5, 1891.

=== Results ===
Wisconsin lieutenant gubernatorial election, 1890
| Party | Candidate | Votes | % |
|---|---|---|---|
| Democratic | Charles Jonas | 159,710 | 52.37 |
| Republican | Joseph B. Treat | 124,736 | 40.90 |
| Prohibition | William R. Nethercut | 13,361 | 4.38 |
| Union Labor | Nelson E. Allen | 7,000 | 2.30 |
| | Scattering | 159 | 0.05 |
| Total votes | | 304,966 | 100.00 |
| Democratic gain from Republican | | | |
