= 1890 United States elections =

- ← 1888 1889 1890 1891 1892 → Midterm elections
- Election day: November 4
- Incumbent president: ▌Benjamin Harrison (R)
- Next Congress: 52nd

Senate elections
- Overall control: Republican hold
- Seats contested: 28 of 85 seats
- Net seat change: Democratic +2
- 1890–91 United States Senate elections results Democratic gain Democratic hold Republican gain Republican hold Populist gain Independent gain Legislature failed to elect

House elections
- Overall control: Democratic gain
- Seats contested: All 332 voting seats
- Net seat change: Democratic +86
- 1890 House of Representatives election results Democratic gain Democratic hold Republican gain Republican hold Populist gain

Gubernatorial elections
- Seats contested: 27
- Net seat change: Democratic +6
- 1890 gubernatorial election results Democratic gain Democratic hold Republican gain Republican hold

Elections occurred in the middle of Republican President Benjamin Harrison's term. Members of the 52nd United States Congress were chosen in this election. The Republicans suffered major losses due to the Panic of 1890 and the unpopularity of the McKinley Tariff. The Populist Party also emerged as an important third party.

The Republicans suffered massive losses to the Democrats in the House, and the Democrats took control of the chamber.

In the Senate, Democrats made minor gains, but Republicans kept control of the chamber. The Populists joined the Senate for the first time, electing two senators.

== See also ==
- 1890 United States House of Representatives elections
- 1890–91 United States Senate elections
