= John Russell (prohibitionist) =

American preacher and prohibition advocate (1822–1912)

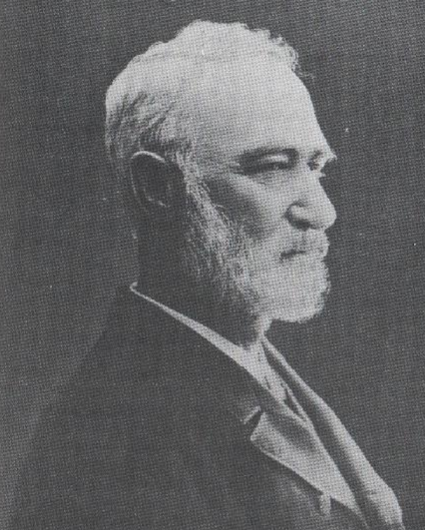

1st Chairman of the Prohibition Party
- In office 1867–1872
- Preceded by: position established
- Succeeded by: Simeon B. Chase

Personal details
- Born: September 20, 1822 Livingston County, New York, U.S.
- Died: November 3, 1912 (aged 90) Detroit, Michigan, U.S.
- Party: Prohibition
- Spouse: Mary Jane Herriman
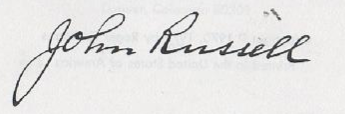
- Signature

John Russell (September 20, 1822 – November 3, 1912) was a Methodist preacher who became a leading advocate for prohibition during the 1870s. Russell helped organize the Prohibition Party, was its first National Committee Chairman, and was the party's running mate for James Black in the 1872 United States presidential election. As a journalist, Russell published the Detroit Peninsular Herald as the first prohibition newspaper.

== Life ==
John Russell was born on September 20, 1822, to Jesse Russell and Catherine Russell in Livingston County, New York. In 1869, he made calls for a convention to form a party in favor of alcoholic prohibition and in Chicago, Illinois he was selected as its first national committee chairman. He died on November 4, 1912, in Detroit, Michigan.

Political offices
Preceded by Azariah S. Partridge	Prohibition nominee for Governor of Michigan; 1892	Succeeded by Albert M. Todd
