= 1890 Texas lieutenant gubernatorial election =

- November 4, 1890
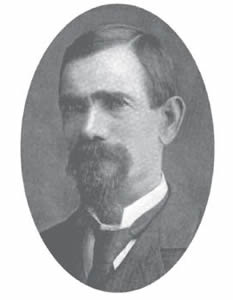

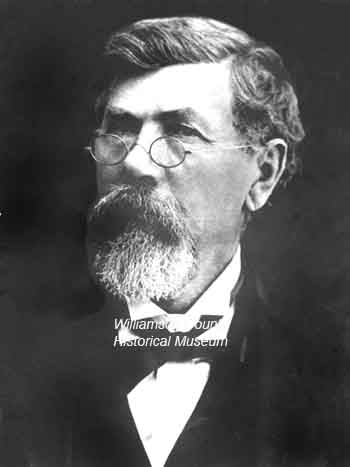
Nominee	George C. Pendleton	William K. Makemson
Party	Democratic	Republican
Popular vote	263,525	75,154
Percentage	77.21%	22.02%
Lieutenant Governor before election
Thomas Benton Wheeler
Democratic
Elected Lieutenant Governor
George C. Pendleton
Democratic

The 1890 Texas lieutenant gubernatorial election was held on November 4, 1890, in order to elect the lieutenant governor of Texas. Democratic nominee and former Speaker of the Texas House of Representatives George C. Pendleton defeated Republican nominee William Makemson and Prohibition nominee J. M. Thompson.

== General election ==
On election day, November 4, 1890, Democratic nominee George C. Pendleton won the election by a margin of 188,371 votes against his foremost opponent Republican nominee William Makemson, thereby retaining Democratic control over the office of lieutenant governor. Pendleton was sworn in as the 17th lieutenant governor of Texas on January 21, 1891.

=== Candidates ===
- George C. Pendleton, former state representative and Speaker of the Texas House, Private in the 19th Texas Cavalry Regiment (Democrat)
- William K. Makemson, lawyer from Georgetown, former district attorney for the Seventeenth Judicial District, former sheriff of Williamson County, civil war veteran of the 5th Texas Partisan Rangers (Republican)
- J. M. Thompson, of Carson (Prohibition)

=== Results ===
Texas lieutenant gubernatorial election, 1890
Party	Candidate	Votes	%	±%
Democratic	George C. Pendleton	263,525	77.21	▲4.85
Republican	William K. Makemson	75,154	22.02	N/A
Prohibition	J. M. Thompson	2,028	0.59	▼1.52
Write-in		593	0.18	0.00
Total votes		341,300	100.00	
Democratic hold				
