= 1890 Connecticut lieutenant gubernatorial election =

- November 4, 1890

| Nominee | Joseph W. Alsop | George A. Bowen |
| Party | Democratic | Republican |
| Popular vote | 67,881 | 63,577 |
| Percentage | 51.60% | 48.40% |
Lieutenant Governor before election
Samuel E. Merwin
Republican
Elected Lieutenant Governor
Samuel E. Merwin
Republican

The 1890 Connecticut lieutenant gubernatorial election was held on November 4, 1890, to elect the lieutenant governor of Connecticut. Democratic nominee and former member of the Connecticut Senate Joseph W. Alsop won the election against Republican nominee George A. Bowen. However due to irregularities in the concurrent gubernatorial election and a split state legislature, the results were not certified and the legislature spent two years debating the issue. The election's winner, Democrat Luzon B. Morris, was not seated and incumbent Republican governor Morgan Bulkeley essentially served as governor by default. The same applied to the results of this election, meaning that this election's winner, Democrat Joseph W. Alsop, was not seated and incumbent Republican lieutenant governor Samuel E. Merwin continued serving as lieutenant governor, despite not running in this election.

== General election ==
On election day, November 4, 1890, Democratic nominee Joseph W. Alsop won the election with 51.60% of the vote. But as the results were not certified due to irregularities in the concurrent gubernatorial election, incumbent Republican lieutenant governor Samuel E. Merwin continued serving as lieutenant governor, despite not running in this election.

=== Results ===
Connecticut lieutenant gubernatorial election, 1890
| Party | Candidate | Votes | % |
|---|---|---|---|
| Democratic | Joseph W. Alsop | 67,881 | 51.60 |
| Republican | George A. Bowen | 63,577 | 48.40 |
| Total votes | | 131,458 | 100.00 |
| Republican hold | | | |
