= William J. Northen =

American politician (1835–1913)

William Jonathan Northen
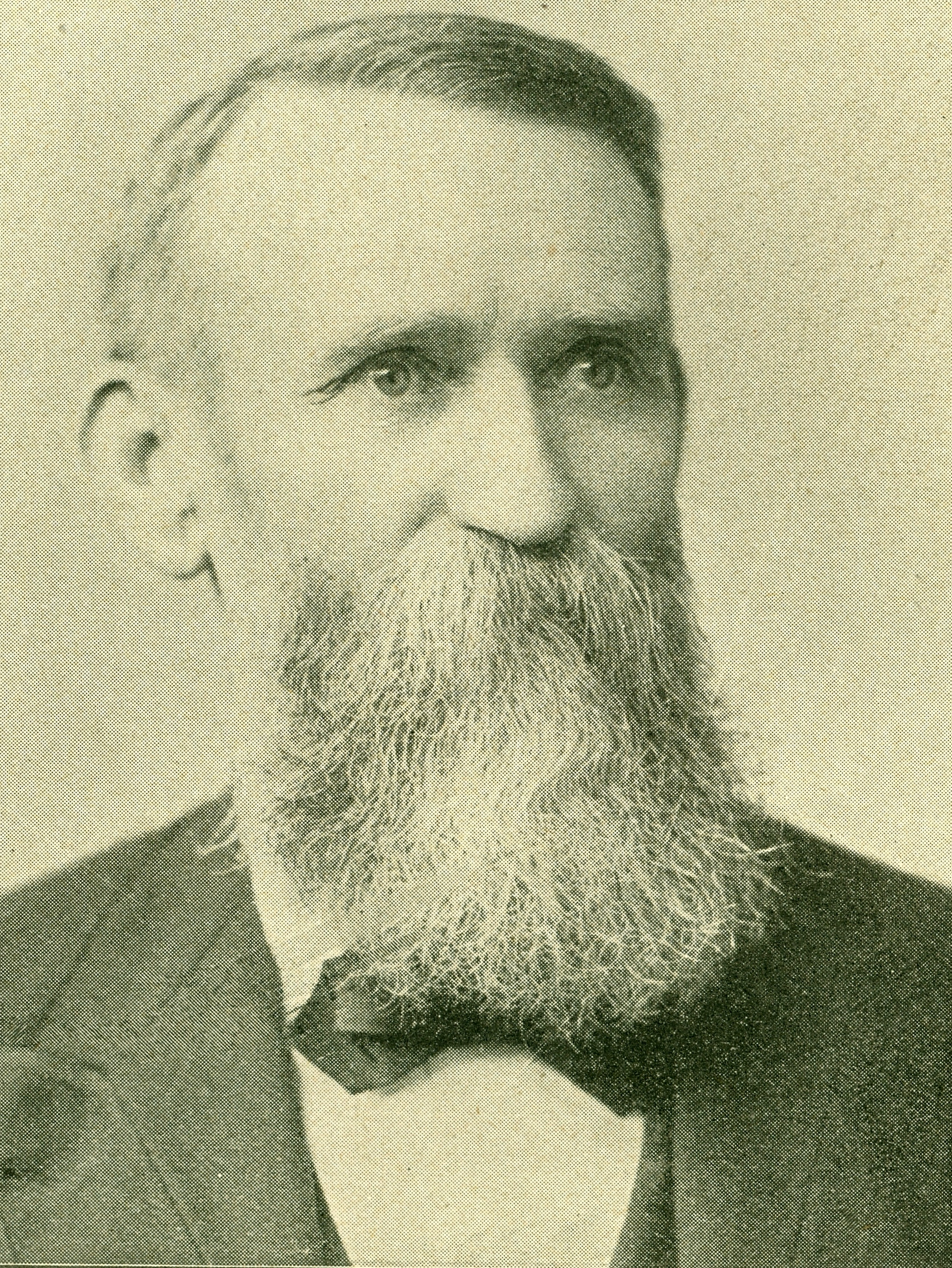

54th Governor of Georgia
- In office November 8, 1890 – October 27, 1894
- Preceded by: John Brown Gordon
- Succeeded by: William Yates Atkinson

Georgia State Senate
- In office 1885–1887

Georgia House of Representatives
- In office 1881–1883
- In office 1877–1879

Personal details
- Born: William Jonathan Northen; July 9, 1835 Jones County, Georgia U.S.
- Died: March 25, 1913 (aged 77) Atlanta, Georgia U.S.
- Resting place: Oakland Cemetery
- Party: Democratic Party
- Spouse: Martha Neel (m. 1860)
- Education: Mercer University

William Jonathan Northen (July 9, 1835 – March 25, 1913), was the 54th governor of Georgia, from 1890 to 1894, as well as a leading Baptist minister. Northen was president of the Georgia Baptist Convention from 1892 to 1910, and president of the Southern Baptist Convention from 1899 to 1901. His political rhetoric was based on his religious outlook, and often focused on racial issues at a time when lynching was increasing. Northen believed that advances in medicine and health would ultimately help African Americans achieve salvation. He promoted the ideology of the modernizing New South, but did not abandon the policy of white supremacy.

== Early life ==
Born in Jones County, Georgia, Northen graduated from Mercer University in 1853. He married Martha Neel in 1860 and served as a two-term member of the Georgia House of Representatives (1877–1881). He also was elected to the Georgia Senate in 1884. He was one of the biggest planters in Hancock County, Georgia.

== Religious life ==
Northen was president of the Georgia Baptist Convention from 1892 to 1910, and president of the Southern Baptist Convention from 1899 to 1901.

== Political life ==
Forced to resign from teaching, Northen began to farm. After the Civil War, farming in Georgia needed reform. Northen set his sights on the Georgia House of Representatives, where he earned the trust of fellow farmers in the same situation as he. He uplifted the spirits of his fellow Georgians, who elected him to two terms in the state House, one term in the state Senate, and president of the Georgia Agricultural Society. He was elected to his first term as governor in 1890.

Northen was a Democrat and a staunch foe of the Populist party. He promoted biracial cooperation among races and was against lynching, a common occurrence at the time. "I regret that the necessity exists for recommending the passage of more stringent laws for the protection of human life," he told state legislators in October 1892.

He was a proponent of temperance, and offered a temperance bill to the Georgia General Assembly on July 14, 1881. The bill passed the House, but was swiftly defeated in the Senate.

Despite opposition from Thomas E. Watson, who supported the Populist Party's candidate, Northen won a second term as governor in 1892.

== Death and legacy ==
Northen contributed to the history of Georgia by compiling a seven-volume collection of biographical essays, published between 1907 and 1912, titled Men of Mark in Georgia. In 1911, he replaced Allen D. Candler as compiler of state records and contributed to the ongoing publication of the Colonial Records of Georgia series.

He died in 1913, in Atlanta, Georgia. Northen is buried in Oakland Cemetery.

== See also ==
- List of Southern Baptist Convention affiliated people
- Southern Baptist Convention
- Southern Baptist Convention Presidents

Party political offices
Preceded by John Brown Gordon	Democratic nominee for Governor of Georgia; 1890, 1892	Succeeded by William Yates Atkinson
Political offices
Preceded by John Brown Gordon	Governor of Georgia; 1890–1894	Succeeded by William Yates Atkinson
Preceded by Jonathan Haralson	President of the Southern Baptist Convention; 1899–1901	Succeeded by James Philip Eagle
