= James Philip Eagle =

American politician (1837–1904)

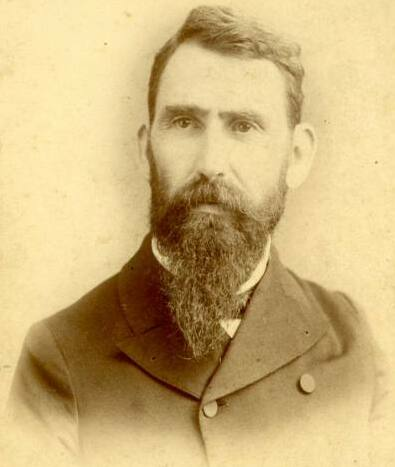

16th Governor of Arkansas
- In office January 8, 1889 – January 14, 1893
- Preceded by: Simon Pollard Hughes, Jr.
- Succeeded by: William Meade Fishback

Member of the Arkansas House of Representatives
- In office 1873–1874; 1877–1878; 1885–1886

Speaker of the Arkansas House of Representatives
- In office 1885–1887
- Preceded by: W. C. Braley
- Succeeded by: John Marshall Hewitt

Personal details
- Born: August 10, 1837 Maury County, Tennessee, U.S.
- Died: December 20, 1904 (aged 67) Little Rock, Arkansas, U.S.
- Resting place: Mount Holly Cemetery, Little Rock, Arkansas, U.S. 34°44′15.3″N 92°16′42.5″W
- Party: Democratic
- Spouse: Mary Kavanaugh Eagle

James Philip Eagle (August 10, 1837 – December 20, 1904) was an American politician who served as Speaker of the Arkansas House of Representatives and as the 16th governor of Arkansas, a Baptist minister, and president of the Southern Baptist Convention. He was a Democrat.

== Early life and military service ==
Eagle was born in Maury County, Tennessee. His family moved to Arkansas early in his life and he was educated in the public schools. He married Mary Kavanaugh Oldham in 1882. Her brother William Kavanaugh Oldham moved to Arkansas in 1885 and later entered politics himself, serving as acting governor for a brief time in 1913. A younger brother, Kies Oldham, served as Eagle's personal secretary during his time as governor.

Eagle was appointed deputy sheriff of Prairie County, Arkansas, in 1859, a position he held until the start of the American Civil War. Eagle enlisted in the Confederate States Army and rose to the rank of major. He served with the 5th Arkansas Infantry and the 2nd Arkansas Mounted Rifles. He campaigned with the Army of Tennessee and fought in most of that army's campaigns from the initial battles in Kentucky all the way to the Battle of Nashville. Eagle was wounded during the Atlanta campaign.

== Ministry and political career ==
At the conclusion of the war, Eagle attended Mississippi College for less than one year but was forced to withdraw due to illness. He studied for the ministry and was ordained as a Baptist preacher.

Eagle served as a member of the Arkansas House of Representatives from 1873 to 1878. He supported Baxter during the Brooks–Baxter War. Eagle served as speaker of the house in 1875. Eagle was elected Governor of Arkansas in 1888, and was reelected for a second term in 1890. The Eagle administration concerned itself with attracting immigration and support for education.

He was sympathetic to women's suffrage and once welcomed Susan B. Anthony to the state though he did not provide active political support. Eagle served on the state capitol commission but was fired by Governor Jeff Davis for allegedly campaigning for an opponent of Davis. Davis was opposed to the construction of the new capitol building.

== Later life and death ==
In 1880, he became president of the Arkansas Baptist Convention until 1904. In 1902, he became president of the Southern Baptist Convention until 1904.

Eagle died at his home in Little Rock, Arkansas, of heart failure, on December 20, 1904. He is buried at the historic Mount Holly Cemetery in Little Rock.

== See also ==
- List of members of the Sons of the American Revolution
- List of presidents of the Southern Baptist Convention
- List of Southern Baptist Convention affiliated people

Party political offices
Preceded by Simon Pollard Hughes Jr.	Democratic nominee for Governor of Arkansas; 1888, 1890	Succeeded by William Meade Fishback
Political offices
Preceded by Simon Pollard Hughes, Jr.	Governor of Arkansas; 1889–1893	Succeeded by William Meade Fishback
Non-profit organization positions
Preceded by William J. Northen	President of the Southern Baptist Convention; 1902–1904	Succeeded by Edwin William Stephens
