= James Munroe Turner =

American politician

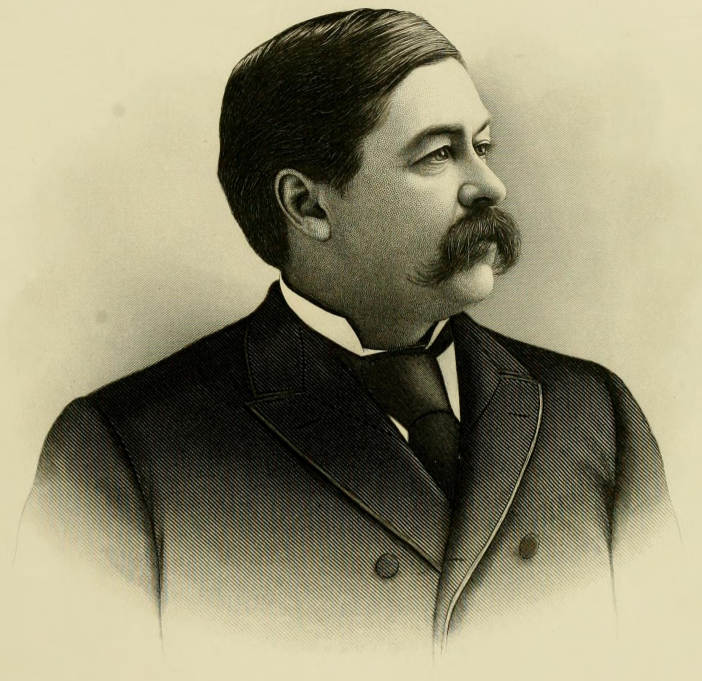

Mayor of Lansing
- In office 1889
- Preceded by: John Crotty
- Succeeded by: Frank B. Johnson
- In office 1895
- Preceded by: Alroy A. Wilbur
- Succeeded by: Russell C. Ostrander

Member of the Michigan House of Representatives from the Ingham County 1st district
- In office January 1, 1877 – December 31, 1878
- Preceded by: Samuel L. Kilbourne
- Succeeded by: Ozro A. Bowen

Personal details
- Born: April 23, 1850 Lansing, Michigan, U.S.
- Died: July 6, 1896 (aged 46) Lansing, Michigan, U.S.
- Resting place: Mount Hope Cemetery; Lansing, Michigan, U.S.
- Party: Republican
- Children: 2, including Scott

James Munroe Turner (April 23, 1850 – July 6, 1896) was a Michigan politician.

== Early life ==
James Munroe Turner was born in Lansing, Michigan, on April 23, 1850, to parents James Madison Turner and Marian Munroe Turner.

== Career ==
On November 7, 1876, Turner was elected to the Michigan House of Representatives where he represented the Ingham County 1st district from January 3, 1877, to December 31, 1878. In 1888, Turner served as an alternate delegate to the Republican National Convention from Michigan. Later in 1888, Turner served as one of Michigan's presidential electors. In 1889, Turner served as mayor of Lansing. In 1890, Turner was the Republican nominee in the Michigan gubernatorial election. Turner was defeated by Democratic nominee, Edwin B. Winans. In 1895, Turner served as mayor of Lansing again. Turner advocated for the policy of free silver, signing a non-partisan call for the policy in January 1896.

== Personal life ==
On September 20, 1876, James M. Turner married Sophia Scott Porter. Together, they had two children. On November 21, 1888, James became a brother-in-law of fellow state representative Frank L. Dodge when Dodge married James's sister, Abigail Rogers Turner.

== Death ==
Turner died on July 6, 1896, in Lansing. He was interred at Mount Hope Cemetery in Lansing.

== See also ==
- Turner-Dodge House

Party political offices
Preceded by Cyrus G. Luce	Republican nominee for Governor of Michigan; 1890	Succeeded by John T. Rich
