= 1890 New York City mayoral election =

- November 4, 1890
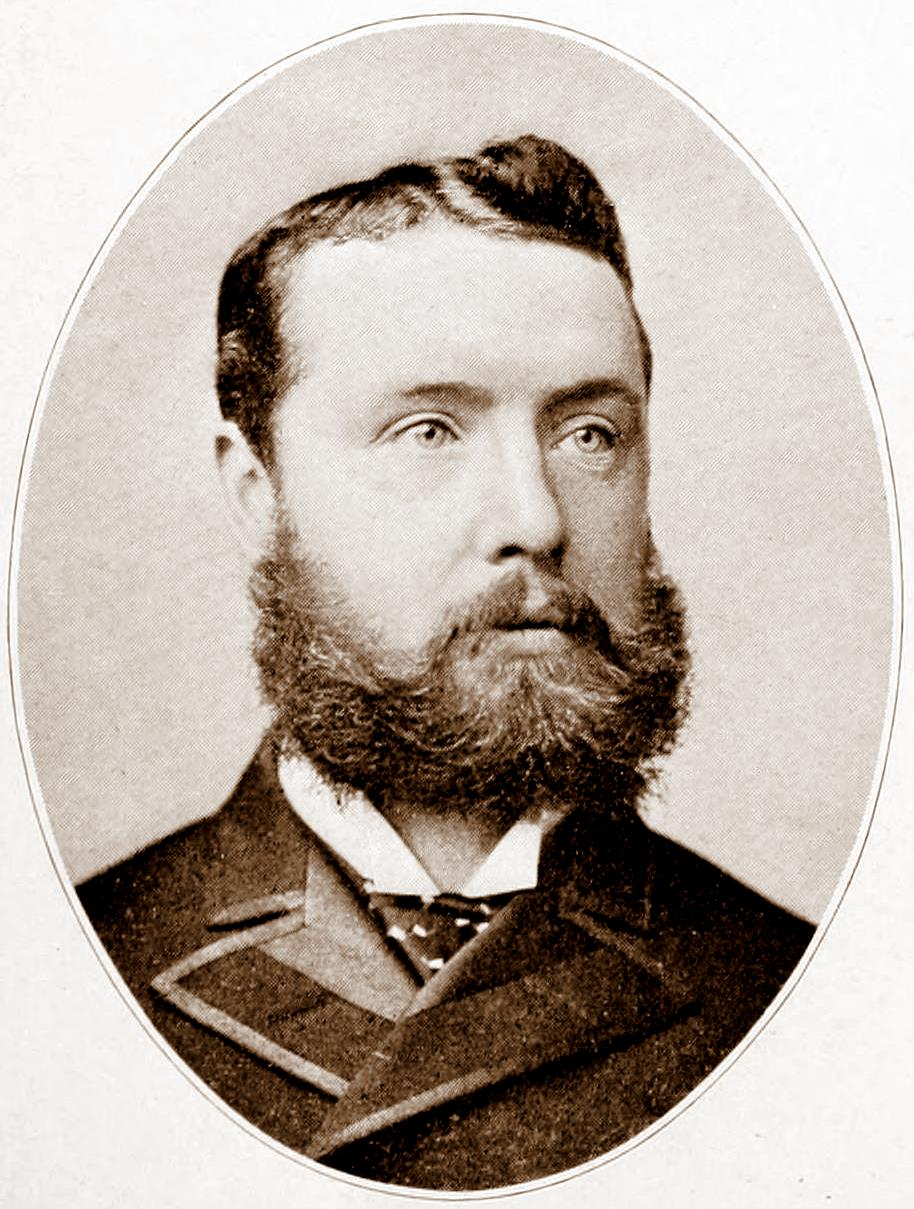

Nominee	Hugh J. Grant	Francis M. Scott
Party	Democratic	Independent Democratic
Alliance		Republican; Municipal League
Popular vote	116,581	93,382
Percentage	53.9%	43.2%
- Ward results Grant: 50–60% 60–70% 80–90% Scott: 40–50% 50–60% 60–70% 80–90%
Mayor before election
Hugh J. Grant
Democratic
Elected mayor
Hugh J. Grant
Democratic

An election for Mayor of New York City was held on November 4, 1890.

Incumbent mayor Hugh J. Grant was re-elected to a second term in office over Aqueduct Commissioner Francis M. Scott, running on the New York County Democracy and People's Municipal League lines with Republican support.

== General election ==
=== Candidates ===
- August Delabar (Socialist Labor)
- W. Jennings Demorest, cosmetics and sewing businessman and publisher of Demorest's Magazine (Prohibition)
- Hugh J. Grant, incumbent mayor since 1889 (Democratic)
- James Redpath, editor of the North American Review (Commonwealth)
- Francis M. Scott, Aqueduct Commissioner of New York City (County Democracy and People's Municipal League)

=== Results ===
1890 New York City mayoral election
Party	Candidate	Votes	%
Democratic	Hugh J. Grant (incumbent)	116,581	53.91%
Independent Democratic	Francis M. Scott	93,382	43.18%
Socialist Labor	August Delabar	4,604	2.13%
Prohibition	W. Jennings Demorest	1,004	0.46%
Commonwealth Party	James Redpath	684	0.32%
Democratic hold			
