= 1890 Peruvian presidential election =

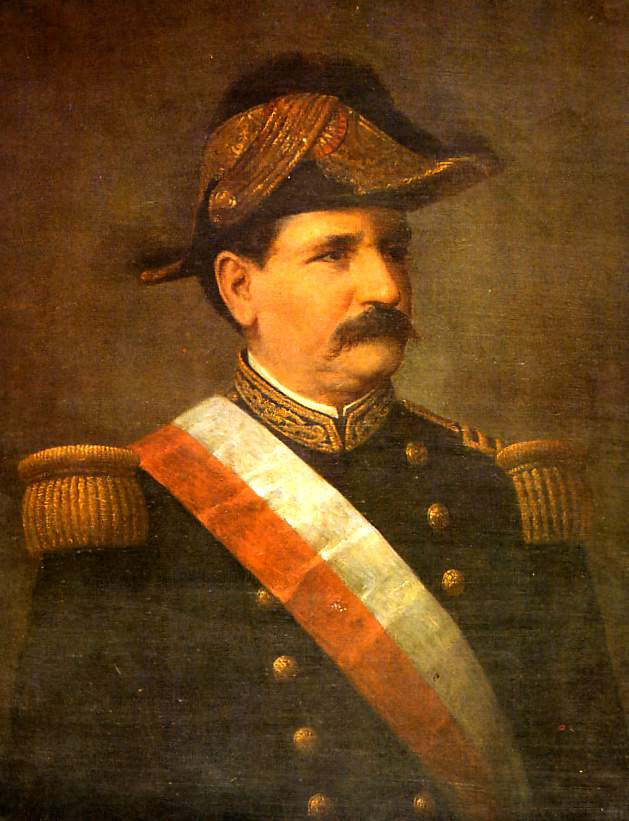
Remigio Morales Bermudez

Presidential elections were held in Peru on 13 April 1890. The result was a victory for Remigio Morales Bermúdez of the Constitutional Party, who received 68% of the vote.

== Results ==
Candidate	Party	Votes	%
Remigio Morales Bermúdez	Constitutional Party	2,899	67.96
Francisco Rojas	Civilista Party	1,315	30.83
Manuel González Prada	Independent	52	1.22
Total		4,266	100.00
Valid votes		4,266	99.44
Invalid/blank votes		24	0.56
Total votes		4,290	100.00
Source: Tuesta
