= Isaac Cappon House =

- U.S. National Register of Historic Places
- Michigan State Historic Site
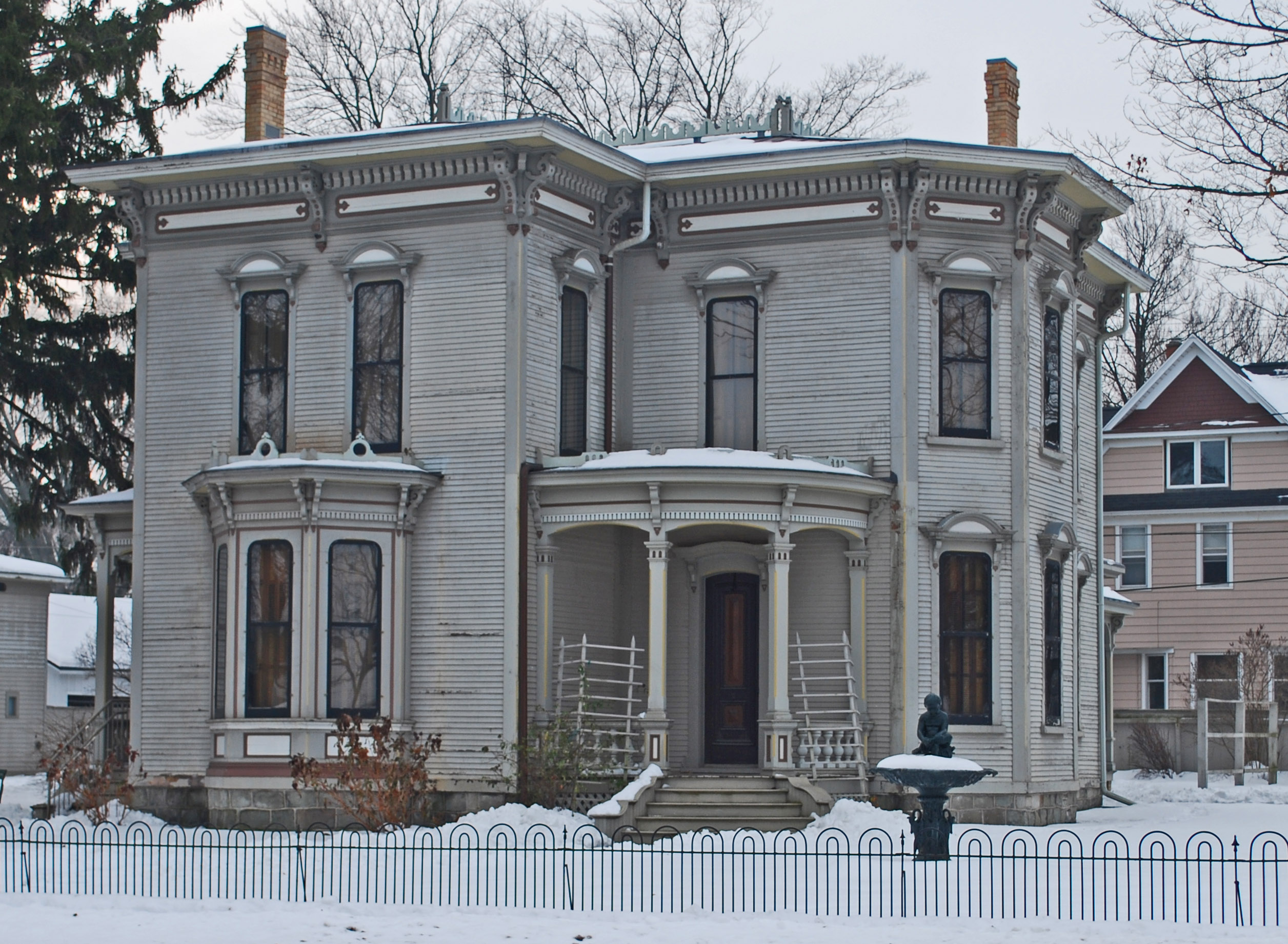

- Location within Michigan Location within the United States
- Interactive map
- Location: 228 W. 9th St., Holland, Michigan
- Coordinates: 42°47′21″N 86°7′4″W
- Area: less than one acre
- Built: 1872
- Built by: John R. Kleyn
- Architectural style: Italianate
- NRHP reference No.: 84001478
- Added to NRHP: January 26, 1984

The Isaac Cappon House was constructed as a private house, located at 228 West 9th Street in Holland, Michigan. It was listed on the National Register of Historic Places in 1984. It is now operated as the Cappon House Museum.

== History ==
Holland was first settled in 1847 by Dutch immigrants led by of the Rev. Albertus C. van Raalte. Hundreds of additional Dutch immigrants settled in Holland in the following few years. Isaac Cappon arrived in New York City in 1847, then came to Holland in 1848. He worked in a tannery until 1856, when he and fellow immigrant John Bertsch founded the Cappon and Bertsch Leather Company. The tannery grew in size, and the partners built a new building in 1863, and enlarged it a few years later.

As Cappon's business grew, so did the settlement of Holland. In 1867, Holland was incorporated as a city, and Isaac Cappon was elected as the first mayor. He eventually served four one-year terms in office, being elected in 1867, and again in 1870, 1874, and 1879. However, in 1871, a disastrous forest fire swept through the city, destroying a substantial number of building, including Cappon's house and the Cappon and Bertsch tannery. The firm rebuilt, constructing a new plant in 1872, adding a drying house the next year, and continuing to grow through the 1870s.

Cappon also rebuilt his own house, hiring builder John R. Kleyn of Holland to construct this house in 1872. The house was completed in 1874. The house remained in the Cappon family until 1978, when the last occupant, Miss Lavina Cappon, died. After this, ownership was transferred to the city of Holland, and the house began operating as a museum. The house has been partially restored to its appearance in 1900, and along with the nearby Thomas and Anna Morrissey House is open to visitors.

== Description ==
The Isaac Cappon House is a two-story T-shaped Italianate structure with a hipped roof with a central cupola. The house is of balloon-framed construction and sits on a rubble foundation. The front facade has a projecting central section, with recessed sections to each side. The double-door main entrance is located in the corner in one recessed section, underneath a bracketed canopy, with a secondary entrance located in the opposite corner. A single story wing projects to the rear.

On the interior, the main entrance opens into a broad hall, flanked by the main staircase. Off the hall is a formal parlor, the original sitting room (now remodeled into a dining room), the original dining room (now remodeled into a kitchen), and a small bedroom. The original kitchen, located in the single story addition, is now a garage. The first floor contains substantial Victorian woodwork and detailing. Upstairs there are two large bedrooms, two smaller ones, and a large bathroom. A small staircase leads to the unfinished attic and then the cupola.
