= Azariah S. Partridge =

American politician

Member of the Michigan House of Representatives from the Genesee County 1st district
- In office January 1, 1881 – 1882
- Preceded by: Jacob Bedtelyon
- Succeeded by: Sumner Howard

Personal details
- Born: December 19, 1834 Saratoga County, New York
- Died: April 28, 1901 (aged 66) Mount Clemens, Michigan
- Party: Republican (1881-1882); Prohibition (1886-1890); Populist (1894)
- Spouse: Lura Penoyer
- Children: 4

Azariah S. Partridge (December 19, 1834 – April 28, 1901) was a Michigan politician.

== Early life ==
Partridge was born on December 19, 1834, in Saratoga County, New York. Around 1856, Partridge moved to Flushing Township, Michigan. Partridge worked as a teacher for several years.

== Political career ==
Partridge was a farmer and a fruit grower. In 1874, Partridge served as drain commissioner for Flushing Township. On January 5, 1881, Partridge was elected as a member of the Michigan House of Representatives from the Genesee County 1st district as a Republican. He held this seat until 1882. In 1886, Partridge ran unsuccessfully as a Prohibitionist candidate for the position of United States Representative from Michigan's 6th District. Partridge became a member of the Michigan Prohibition Party State Central Committee in 1887. Partridge ran unsuccessfully as a Prohibitionist candidate in the 1890 Michigan gubernatorial election. Henry I. Allen, of Schoolcraft, Michigan, ran as the Prohibitionist candidate for lieutenant governor alongside Partridge. In 1894, Partridge ran unsuccessful once again for the position of United States Representative from Michigan's 6th District as a Populist candidate. Around 1898, Partridge moved to Mount Clemens, Michigan. he was the president of the Michigan Patrons of Industry

== Personal life ==
Partridge married Lura Penoyer on February 7, 1862. She was one of the first white women to be born in the Flushing area. Together they had four children. Lura died on May 11, 1892. Partridge was a Freemason. Partridge was Baptist.

== Death ==
Partridge had a stroke of paralysis on April 23, 1901. On April 27, he had another stroke. On April 28, Partridge died in his home in Mount Clemens. He is interred at Flushing City Cemetery.

Party political offices
Preceded by Amherst B. Cheney	Prohibition nominee for Governor of Michigan; 1890	Succeeded by John Russell
