= 1890 Georgia gubernatorial election =

- October 1, 1890
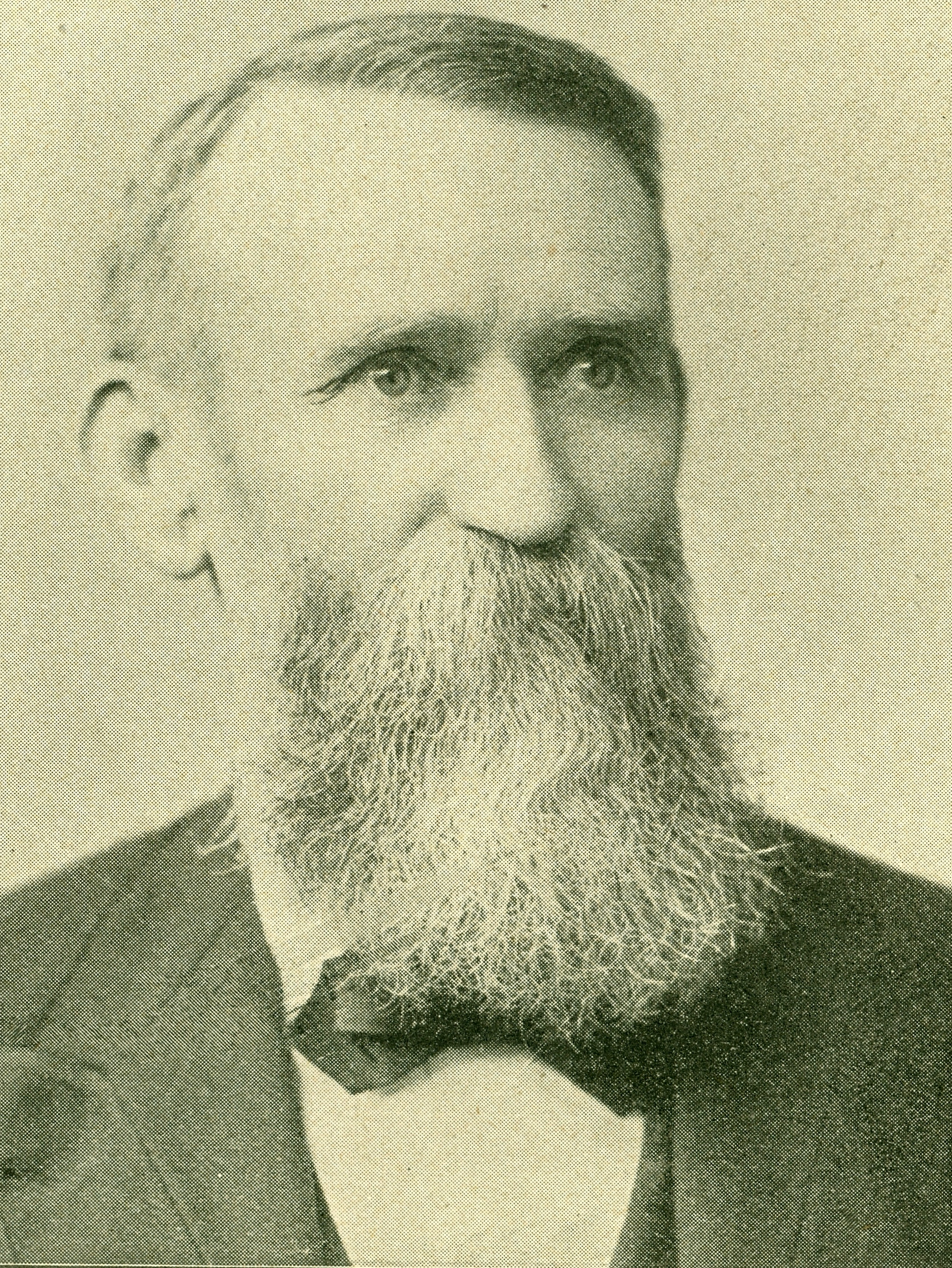
Nominee	William J. Northen
Party	Democratic
Popular vote	102,757
Percentage	99.28%
- County results Northen: 70–80% >90% Write-in: 50–60%
Governor before election
John B. Gordon
Democratic
Elected Governor
William J. Northen
Democratic

The 1890 Georgia gubernatorial election was held on October 1, 1890, to elect the governor of Georgia. Democratic nominee and former member of the Georgia State Senate William J. Northen ran unopposed and thus won the election.

== General election ==
On election day, October 1, 1890, Democratic nominee William J. Northen won the election with 99.28% of the vote, thereby holding Democratic control over the office of governor. Northen was sworn in as the 54th governor of Georgia on November 8, 1890.

=== Results ===
Georgia gubernatorial election, 1890
Party	Candidate	Votes	%
Democratic	William J. Northen	102,757	99.28
	Scattering	750	0.72
Total votes		103,507	100.00
Democratic hold			
