= 1890 Arkansas gubernatorial election =

- September 1, 1890
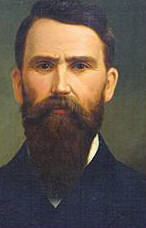

Nominee	James Philip Eagle	Napoleon B. Fizer
Party	Democratic	Union Labor
Alliance		Republican
Popular vote	106,267	85,181
Percentage	55.51%	44.49%
- County results Eagle: 50–60% 60–70% 70–80% 80–90% Fizer: 50–60% 60–70% 70–80%
Governor before election
James Philip Eagle
Democratic
Elected Governor
James Philip Eagle
Democratic

The 1890 Arkansas gubernatorial election was held on September 1, 1890. Incumbent Democratic Governor James Philip Eagle defeated Union Labor and Republican fusion nominee Napoleon B. Fizer with 55.51% of the vote.

== General election ==
=== Candidates ===
- James Philip Eagle, Democratic, incumbent Governor
- Napoleon B. Fizer, Union Labor, Methodist minister

The Republican Party endorsed Fizer.

=== Results ===
1890 Arkansas gubernatorial election
Party	Candidate	Votes	%	±%
Democratic	James Philip Eagle (incumbent)	106,267	55.51%	+1.42%
Union Labor	Napoleon B. Fizer	85,181	44.49%	−1.42%
Majority		21,086	11.02%	
Turnout		191,448		
Democratic hold		Swing		
