= 1890 Michigan gubernatorial election =

- November 4, 1890
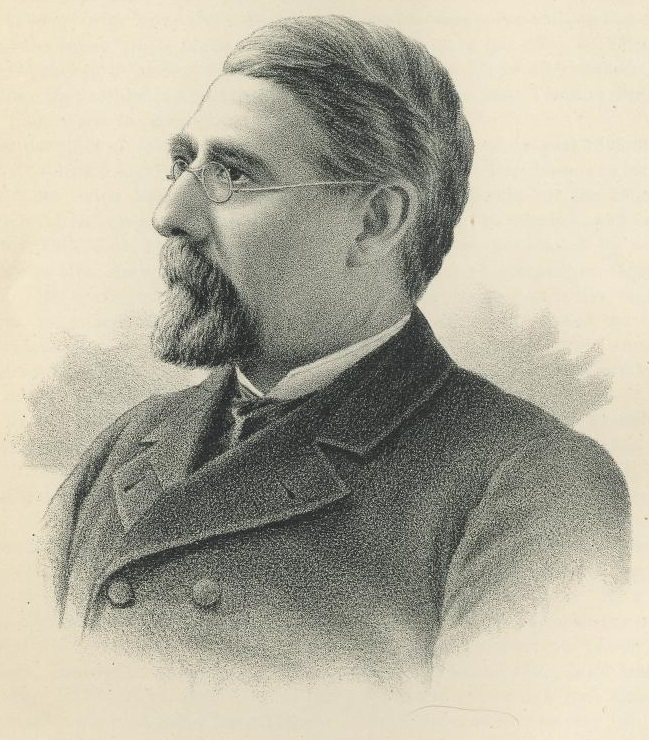

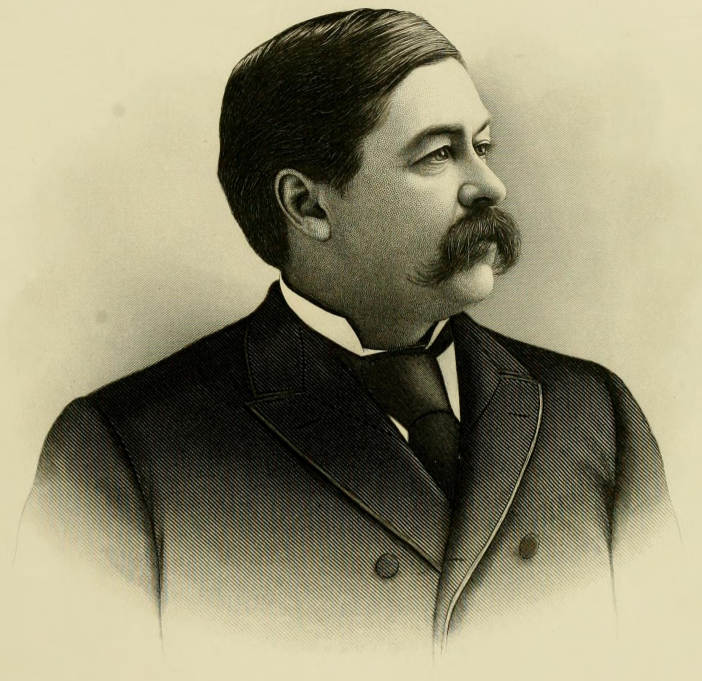

Nominee	Edwin B. Winans	James M. Turner	Azariah S. Partridge
Party	Democratic	Republican	Prohibition
Popular vote	183,725	172,205	28,681
Percentage	46.18%	43.28%	7.21%
- County results Winans: 30–40% 40–50% 50–60% 60–70% 90–100% Turner: 30–40% 40–50% 50–60% 60–70% 80–90% No data/vote
Governor before election
Cyrus G. Luce
Republican
Elected Governor
Edwin B. Winans
Democratic

The 1890 Michigan gubernatorial election was held on November 4, 1890. Democratic nominee Edwin B. Winans defeated Republican candidate James M. Turner with 46.18% of the vote. As of 2026, this is the most recent election in which Ottawa County has voted Democratic.

== General election ==
=== Candidates ===
Major party candidates

- James M. Turner, Republican
- Edwin B. Winans, Democratic

Other candidates

- Eugene H. Belden, Industrial
- Azariah S. Partridge, Prohibition

=== Results ===
1890 Michigan gubernatorial election
Party	Candidate	Votes	%	±%
Democratic	Edwin B. Winans	183,725	46.18%	+0.59%
Republican	James M. Turner	172,205	43.28%	−5.92%
Prohibition	Azariah S. Partridge	28,681	7.21%	+2.92%
Industrial	Eugene H. Belden	13,198	3.32%	+2.92%
	Scattering	47	0.01%	
Plurality		11,520	2.90%	
Total votes		397,856	100.00%	
Democratic gain from Republican		Swing	+6.51%	

==== Results by county ====
Besides Ottawa County's ongoing Republican streak, several other counties would also not vote Democratic again for a long time after this election: Delta County (1932), Iron County (1934), St. Clair County (1936), Ogemaw County (1970), Missaukee County (1978), and Osceola County (1986). Winans was the first Democrat to be elected governor without carrying St. Joseph County.

County	Edwin B. Winans Democratic		James M. Turner Republican		Azariah S. Partridge Prohibition		Eugene H. Belden Industrial		Margin		Total votes cast
County	#	%	#	%	#	%	#	%	#	%	Total votes cast
Alcona	387	44.95%	459	53.31%	11	1.28%	4	0.46%	-72	-8.36%	861
Alger	46	13.98%	279	84.80%	4	1.22%	0	0.00%	-233	-70.82%	329
Allegan	3,135	39.89%	3,471	44.17%	772	9.82%	480	6.11%	-336	-4.28%	7,859 (Note: Includes 1 scattering vote)
Alpena	1,460	52.14%	1,254	44.79%	81	2.89%	5	0.18%	-206	-7.36%	2,800
Antrim	608	36.00%	803	47.54%	252	14.92%	22	1.30%	-195	-11.55%	1,689 (Note: Includes 4 scattering votes)
Arenac	386	39.31%	247	25.15%	19	1.93%	330	33.60%	56 (Note: Winans' margin over Belden)	5.70%	982
Baraga	461	50.88%	434	47.90%	11	1.21%	0	0.00%	27	2.98%	906
Barry	2,175	42.41%	2,359	45.99%	517	10.08%	78	1.52%	-184	-3.59%	5,129
Bay	5,152	58.61%	3,216	36.58%	191	2.17%	232	2.64%	1,936	22.02%	8,791
Benzie	289	33.03%	447	51.09%	137	15.66%	2	0.23%	-158	-18.06%	875
Berrien	4,206	47.24%	3,929	44.13%	572	6.42%	196	2.20%	277	3.11%	8,903
Branch	1,650	26.43%	2,612	41.85%	964	15.44%	1,015	16.26%	-962	-15.41%	6,242
Calhoun	3,584	42.41%	3,651	43.21%	1,099	13.01%	113	1.34%	-67	-0.79%	8,450 (Note: Includes 3 scattering votes)
Cass	2,474	45.95%	2,513	46.68%	390	7.24%	7	0.13%	-39	-0.72%	5,384
Charlevoix	667	35.48%	1,025	54.52%	128	6.81%	60	3.19%	-358	-19.04%	1,880
Cheboygan	1,274	55.25%	953	41.33%	68	2.95%	11	0.48%	321	13.92%	2,306
Chippewa	865	47.55%	943	51.84%	5	0.27%	6	0.33%	-78	-4.29%	1,819
Clare	749	49.70%	604	40.08%	137	9.09%	17	1.13%	145	9.62%	1,507
Clinton	2,820	46.99%	2,620	43.66%	519	8.65%	42	0.70%	200	3.33%	6,001
Crawford	350	54.52%	285	44.39%	6	0.93%	0	0.00%	65	10.12%	642
Delta	1,454	53.73%	1,174	43.39%	69	2.55%	7	0.26%	280	10.35%	2,706 (Note: Includes 2 scattering votes)
Eaton	2,539	33.30%	3,395	44.53%	603	7.91%	1,087	14.26%	-856	-11.23%	7,624
Emmet	962	50.87%	825	43.63%	94	4.97%	10	0.53%	137	7.24%	1,891
Genesee	3,654	44.69%	3,507	42.89%	933	11.41%	81	0.99%	147	1.80%	8,177
Gladwin	286	38.70%	406	54.94%	35	4.74%	12	1.62%	-120	-16.24%	739
Gogebic	1,036	40.30%	1,465	56.98%	60	2.33%	6	0.23%	-429	-16.69%	2,571
Grand Traverse	701	29.96%	1,217	52.01%	306	13.08%	116	4.96%	-516	-22.05%	2,340
Gratiot	2,283	39.32%	2,747	47.31%	557	9.59%	219	3.77%	-464	-7.99%	5,806
Hillsdale	2,671	36.56%	3,383	46.30%	781	10.69%	471	6.45%	-712	-9.75%	7,306
Houghton	2,085	43.52%	2,496	52.10%	183	3.82%	27	0.56%	-411	-8.58%	4,791
Huron	1,980	48.29%	1,391	33.93%	171	4.17%	558	13.61%	589	14.37%	4,100
Ingham	3,874	42.71%	3,581	39.48%	691	7.62%	924	10.19%	293	3.23%	9,070
Ionia	3,737	47.31%	3,712	46.99%	439	5.56%	10	0.13%	25	0.32%	7,899
Iosco	1,417	48.30%	1,419	48.36%	90	3.07%	8	0.27%	-2	-0.07%	2,934
Iron	897	50.85%	833	47.22%	33	1.87%	1	0.06%	64	3.63%	1,764
Isabella	1,520	41.86%	1,553	42.77%	243	6.69%	315	8.68%	-33	-0.91%	3,631
Jackson	4,503	44.80%	3,733	37.14%	749	7.45%	1,067	10.61%	770	7.66%	10,052
Kalamazoo	3,768	42.95%	4,250	48.44%	556	6.34%	198	2.26%	-482	-5.49%	8,773
Kalkaska	326	30.19%	565	52.31%	179	16.57%	10	0.93%	-239	-22.13%	1,080
Kent	11,833	50.60%	9,774	41.80%	1,694	7.24%	83	0.35%	2,059	8.80%	23,385
Keweenaw	79	19.75%	290	72.50%	22	5.50%	9	2.25%	-211	-52.75%	400
Lake	585	45.99%	586	46.07%	99	7.78%	2	0.16%	-1	-0.08%	1,272
Lapeer	2,407	44.51%	2,429	44.91%	554	10.24%	18	0.33%	-22	-0.41%	5,408
Leelanau	362	33.21%	570	52.29%	149	13.67%	9	0.83%	-208	-19.08%	1,090
Lenawee	5,267	45.41%	4,977	42.91%	1,306	11.26%	50	0.43%	290	2.50%	11,600
Livingston	2,370	43.88%	1,899	35.16%	447	8.28%	684	12.66%	471	8.72%	5,401
Luce	235	48.16%	243	49.80%	10	2.05%	0	0.00%	-8	-1.64%	488
Mackinac	776	68.13%	322	28.27%	33	2.90%	8	0.70%	454	39.86%	1,139
Macomb	3,026	52.06%	2,483	42.71%	285	4.90%	18	0.31%	543	9.34%	5,813
Manistee	1,854	49.57%	1,615	43.18%	266	7.11%	5	0.13%	239	6.39%	3,740
Manitou	97	91.51%	9	8.49%	0	0.00%	0	0.00%	88	83.02%	106
Marquette	1,864	34.05%	3,017	55.11%	580	10.59%	14	0.26%	-1,153	-21.06%	5,475
Mason	1,346	49.63%	1,165	42.96%	184	6.78%	17	0.63%	181	6.67%	2,712
Mecosta	1,226	36.72%	1,520	45.52%	361	10.81%	232	6.95%	-294	-8.81%	3,339
Menominee	2,057	46.04%	2,112	47.27%	272	6.09%	27	0.60%	-55	-1.23%	4,468
Midland	776	40.12%	867	44.83%	106	5.48%	185	9.57%	-91	-4.71%	1,934
Missaukee	533	49.35%	455	42.13%	89	8.24%	2	0.19%	78	7.22%	1,080
Monroe	3,163	54.47%	2,251	38.76%	384	6.61%	8	0.14%	912	15.71%	5,807
Montcalm	2,446	40.54%	3,032	50.25%	515	8.53%	41	0.68%	-586	-9.71%	6,034
Montmorency	217	45.40%	249	52.09%	10	2.09%	2	0.42%	-32	-6.69%	478
Muskegon	3,278	48.16%	2,937	43.15%	578	8.49%	14	0.21%	341	5.01%	6,807
Newaygo	1,458	39.73%	1,713	46.68%	339	9.24%	160	4.36%	-255	-6.95%	3,670
Oakland	4,784	48.38%	4,244	42.92%	714	7.22%	147	1.49%	540	5.46%	9,889
Oceana	1,361	43.08%	1,125	35.61%	664	21.02%	9	0.28%	236	7.47%	3,159
Ogemaw	509	45.94%	504	45.49%	91	8.21%	4	0.36%	5	0.45%	1,108
Ontonagon	588	61.25%	363	37.81%	9	0.94%	0	0.00%	225	23.44%	960
Osceola	1,006	40.96%	968	39.41%	466	18.97%	16	0.65%	38	1.55%	2,456
Oscoda	252	42.64%	327	55.33%	8	1.35%	4	0.68%	-75	-12.69%	591
Otsego	456	42.11%	564	52.08%	62	5.72%	1	0.09%	-108	-9.97%	1,083
Ottawa	3,109	48.51%	2,965	46.26%	316	4.93%	19	0.30%	144	2.25%	6,409
Presque Isle	400	53.48%	332	44.39%	12	1.60%	4	0.53%	68	9.09%	748
Roscommon	286	58.97%	189	38.97%	10	2.06%	0	0.00%	97	20.00%	485
Saginaw	7,395	55.05%	5,450	40.57%	563	4.19%	26	0.19%	1,945	14.48%	13,434
Sanilac	1,897	42.10%	2,015	44.72%	482	10.70%	104	2.31%	-118	-2.62%	4,506 (Note: Includes 8 scattering votes)
Schoolcraft	579	51.47%	442	39.29%	95	8.44%	9	0.80%	137	12.18%	1,125
Shiawassee	2,800	42.13%	2,723	40.97%	762	11.47%	361	5.43%	77	1.16%	6,646
St. Clair	4,826	52.77%	3,922	42.88%	379	4.14%	9	0.10%	904	9.88%	9,146 (Note: Includes 10 scattering votes)
St. Joseph	2,387	38.27%	2,394	38.38%	330	5.29%	1,126	18.05%	-7	-0.11%	6,237
Tuscola	1,941	33.09%	2,477	42.23%	412	7.02%	1,033	17.61%	-536	-9.14%	5,866
Van Buren	1,962	31.51%	2,841	45.62%	542	8.70%	882	14.16%	-879	-14.12%	6,227
Washtenaw	5,201	56.82%	3,313	36.19%	599	6.54%	41	0.45%	1,888	20.62%	9,154
Wayne	21,524	55.99%	15,867	41.27%	986	2.56%	65	0.17%	5,657	14.72%	38,443
Wexford	776	40.23%	909	47.12%	241	12.49%	3	0.16%	-133	-6.89%	1,929
Total	183,725	46.18%	172,205	43.28%	28,681	7.21%	13,198	3.32%	11,520	2.90%	397,856

===== Counties that flipped from Republican to Democratic =====
- Berrien
- Clare
- Clinton
- Delta
- Genesee
- Ionia
- Iron
- Jackson
- Kent
- Lenawee
- Mason
- Missaukee
- Muskegon
- Oakland
- Oceana
- Ogemaw
- Osceola
- Ottawa
- Roscommon
- Schoolcraft
- Shiawassee
- St. Clair

===== Counties that flipped from Union Labor to Democratic =====
- Arenac

===== Counties that flipped from Democratic to Republican =====
- Iosco
- Montmorency
- Oscoda
