= Edwin B. Winans (politician) =

American politician (1826–1894)

Edwin Winans
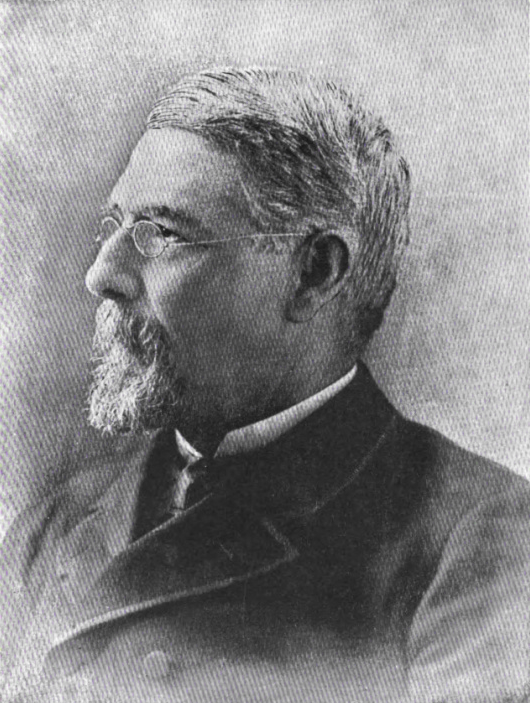

22nd Governor of Michigan
- In office January 1, 1891 – January 1, 1893
- Lieutenant: John Strong
- Preceded by: Cyrus G. Luce
- Succeeded by: John T. Rich

Member of the U.S. House of Representatives from Michigan's 6th district
- In office March 4, 1883 – March 3, 1887
- Preceded by: Oliver L. Spaulding
- Succeeded by: Mark S. Brewer

Member of the Michigan House of Representatives from the Livingston County 1st district
- In office January 1, 1861 – December 31, 1864
- Succeeded by: William Ball

Personal details
- Born: May 16, 1826 Avon, New York, U.S.
- Died: July 4, 1894 (aged 68) Hamburg Township, Michigan, U.S.
- Party: Democratic
- Spouse: Elizabeth Galloway (m. 1855)
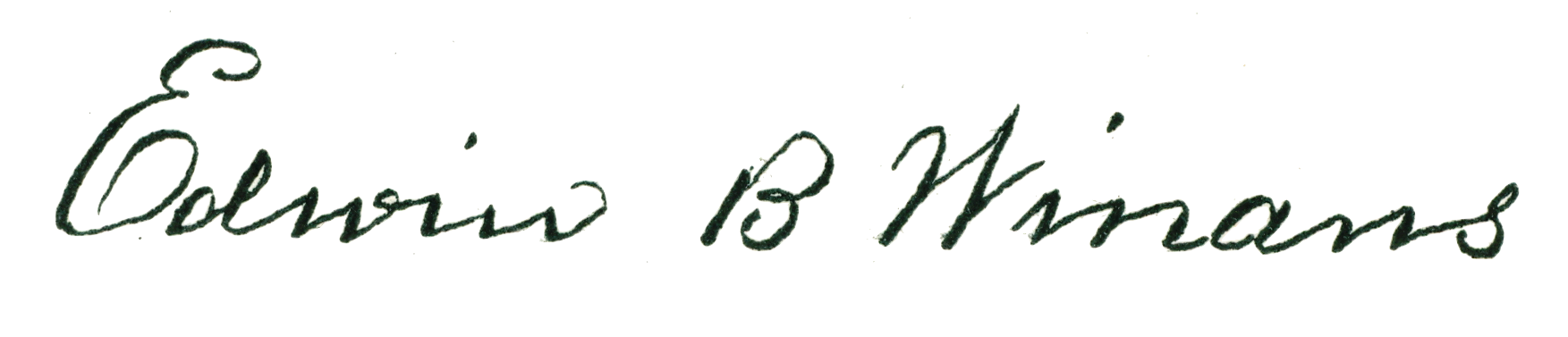
- Signature

Edwin Baruch Winans (May 16, 1826 – July 4, 1894) was a U.S. representative from and the 22nd governor of Michigan.

== Early life in New York and Michigan ==
Winans was born in Avon, New York, and moved with his parents, John and Eliza (née Way), to Livingston County, Michigan in 1834. There, they settled a farm in Unadilla Township. His father died when he was a child. Winans moved with his mother to Pettysville, also in Livingston County. There, Winans worked in a flour and wool carding mill. At the age of twenty, he attended Albion College, for two and a half years in preparation for entering the Law School of the University of Michigan at Ann Arbor.

== California Gold Rush ==
Before completing his studies, Winans was drawn by news of the California Gold Rush, and in March 1850 left for California by an overland route to seek his fortune. Arriving July 20, he engaged in mining first on the north branch of the North Yuba River near Placerville. He continued the same work with some varied success in different parts of the state. In 1853, he was one of the members of the Randolph Hill Mining Company in the town of Rough and Ready (now a town west of Grass Valley in Nevada County). In 1855, he returned to Michigan. Having returned home, he learned of his mother's death. On September 3, 1855, he married Elizabeth Galloway and then returned to California with his wife, where he continued with the Randolph Hill Mining Company until its dissolution in 1857. He was a principal stockholder in the Rough and Ready Ditch Company and also engaged in banking in Rough and Ready.

== Politics in Michigan ==
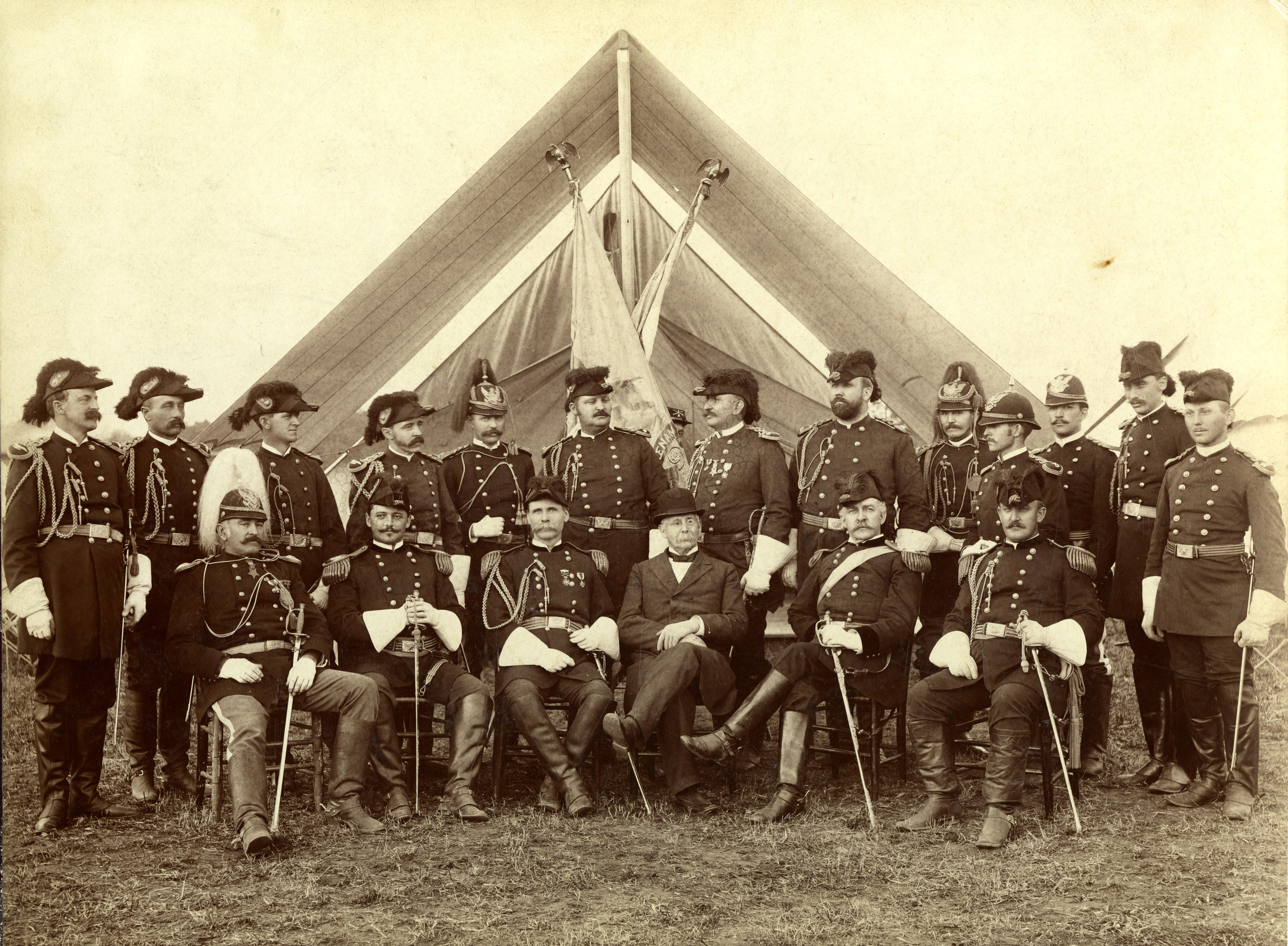
Governor Winans and staff of the Michigan National Guard, ca. 1891

He returned to Michigan in 1858 and settled on a 400-acre (1.6 km^{2}) farm in Hamburg Township, Michigan, where he and his wife had two sons, Edwin, Jr. and George. He was twice elected a member of the Michigan State House of Representatives, where he represented Livingston County's 1st district as a Democrat from 1861 to 1864. He was a delegate to the state constitutional convention of May 15, 1867. He was supervisor of Hamburg Township from 1872 to 1873 and probate judge of Livingston County from 1877 to 1881.

Winans was elected as on the Democrat-Greenback Fusion ticket and seated with the Democrats in the United States House of Representatives for the Forty-eighth and Forty-ninth Congresses, serving from March 4, 1883, to March 3, 1887. He served as Governor of Michigan from 1891 to 1893. During his tenure, several election reform bills were sanctioned, the most significant of which was the secret Australian ballot. His son, George, acted as his private secretary.

== Death and legacy ==
Winans died in Hamburg, Michigan at age 68, and is interred in Hamburg Cemetery.

Winans's son, also named Edwin Baruch Winans, was a major general in the United States Army and commanding general of the Third Army from September 15, 1932, to September 30, 1933. He also served as superintendent of the United States Military Academy at West Point, New York in 1927.

Party political offices
| Preceded by Wellington R. Burt | Democratic nominee for Governor of Michigan; 1890 | Succeeded by Allen B. Morse |
U.S. House of Representatives
| Preceded by Oliver L. Spaulding | United States Representative for the 6th congressional district of Michigan; 1883 – 1887 | Succeeded by Mark S. Brewer |
Political offices
| Preceded by Cyrus G. Luce | Governor of Michigan; 1891–1893 | Succeeded by John T. Rich |
