= List of third-party and independent performances in United States gubernatorial elections =

This is a list of notable performances of third party and independent candidates in United States gubernatorial elections. It is rare for candidates, other than those of the six parties which have succeeded as major parties (Federalist Party, Democratic-Republican Party, National Republican Party, Democratic Party, Whig Party, Republican Party), to take large shares of the vote in elections.

In the 369 gubernatorial elections since 1990, third party or independent candidates have won at least 5.0% of the vote 53 times (14%), while six candidates have won election (2%). The most recent third party or independent governor to win was Alaska's Bill Walker, a Republican turned independent, in 2014.

Listed below are gubernatorial elections since the 1820s in which a third party or independent candidate won at least 5.0% of the vote. Winners are shown in bold.

Notable third party gubernatorial performances
Year	State	Party	Nominee	Running mate	# Votes	% Votes	Place
1823	Vermont	Independent	Dudley Chase		1,088	8.11 / 100	2nd
1824	Vermont	Independent	Joel Doolittle		1,962	12.48 / 100	2nd
1826	Vermont	Independent	Joel Doolittle		3,157	22.3 / 100	2nd
1827	Vermont	Independent	Joel Doolittle		1,951	12.13 / 100	2nd
1828	New York	Anti-Masonic	Solomon Southwick		33,345	12.06 / 100	3rd
1829	Georgia	Democratic-Troup	George Rockingham Gilmer		24,204	69.31 / 100	**1st**
1829	Georgia	Democratic-Clark	Joel Crawford		10,718	30.69 / 100	2nd
1829	Pennsylvania	Anti-Masonic	Joseph Ritner		51,776	39.83 / 100	2nd
1829	Vermont	Anti-Masonic	Heman Allen (of Milton)		7,346	28.59 / 100	2nd
1830	Vermont	Anti-Masonic	William A. Palmer		10,923	35.56 / 100	2nd
1831	Connecticut	Anti-Masonic	Zalmon Storrs		4,778	25.62 / 100	2nd
1831	Georgia	Union	Wilson Lumpkin		27,305	51.35 / 100	**1st**
1831	Georgia	Troup	George Rockingham Gilmer		25,867	48.65 / 100	2nd
1831	Indiana	Independent	Milton Stapp		6,984	13.56 / 100	3rd
1831	Massachusetts	Anti-Masonic	Samuel Lathrop		13,357	25.01 / 100	2nd
1831	Vermont	Anti-Masonic	William A. Palmer		15,258	44.0 / 100	**1st**
1832	Massachusetts	Anti-Masonic	Samuel Lathrop		14,755	22.97 / 100	3rd
1832	Ohio	Anti-Masonic	Darius Lyman		63,185	46.99 / 100	2nd
1832	Pennsylvania	Anti-Masonic	Joseph Ritner		88,165	49.12 / 100	2nd
1832	Rhode Island (General)	Anti-Masonic	William Sprague III		610	10.82 / 100	3rd
1832	Rhode Island (1st Runoff)	Anti-Masonic	William Sprague III		698	10.03 / 100	3rd
1832	Rhode Island (2nd Runoff)	Anti-Masonic	William Sprague III		792	13.52 / 100	3rd
1832	Rhode Island (3rd Runoff)	Anti-Masonic	William Sprague III		967	14.33 / 100	3rd
1832	Rhode Island (4th Runoff)	Anti-Masonic	William Sprague III		832	13.8 / 100	3rd
1832	Vermont	Anti-Masonic	William A. Palmer		20,565	46.4 / 100	**1st**
1833	Connecticut	Anti-Masonic	Zalmon Storrs		3,250	14.87 / 100	3rd
1833	Georgia	Union	Wilson Lumpkin		30,861	51.93 / 100	**1st**
1833	Georgia	Troup	Joel Crawford		28,670	48.07 / 100	2nd
1833	Maine	Independent Democrat	Samuel E. Smith		3,024	6.13 / 100	3rd
1833	Massachusetts	Anti-Masonic	John Quincy Adams		18,274	29.14 / 100	2nd
1833	Massachusetts	Workingmen's	Samuel L. Allen		3,459	5.52 / 100	4th
1833	Vermont	Anti-Masonic	William A. Palmer		20,565	52.86 / 100	**1st**
1834	Connecticut	Anti-Masonic	Zalmon Storrs		2,398	6.49 / 100	3rd
1834	Massachusetts	Anti-Masonic	John Bailey		10,160	13.48 / 100	3rd
1834	Vermont	Anti-Masonic	William A. Palmer		17,131	45.37 / 100	**1st**
1835	Georgia	Union	William Schley		31,197	52.11 / 100	**1st**
1835	Georgia	State Rights	Charles Dougherty		28,670	47.89 / 100	2nd
1835	Pennsylvania	Anti-Masonic	Joseph Ritner		94,023	46.92 / 100	**1st**
1835	Pennsylvania	Independent Democrat	George Wolf		65,804	32.83 / 100	2nd
1835	Tennessee	Anti-Van Buren Democrat	Newton Cannon		41,862	50.41 / 100	**1st**
1835	Tennessee	Independent	West H. Humphreys		7,999	9.63 / 100	3rd
1836	Missouri	Independent	William Henry Ashley		13,057	47.7 / 100	2nd
1836	New Hampshire	Independent	George Sullivan		2,230	7.27 / 100	3rd
1837	Alabama	Anti-Van Buren Democrat	Samuel W. Oliver		20,152	45.21 / 100	2nd
1837	Georgia	State Rights	George Rockingham Gilmer		34,179	50.56 / 100	**1st**
1837	Georgia	Union	William Schley		33,417	49.44 / 100	2nd
1837	Mississippi	State Rights	J. B. Morgan		9,896	35.54 / 100	2nd
1837	Mississippi	State Rights	John A. Grimball		4,974	17.86 / 100	3rd
1838	Pennsylvania	Anti-Masonic	Joseph Ritner		122,325	48.9 / 100	2nd
1839	Georgia	Union	Charles James McDonald		34,634	51.42 / 100	**1st**
1839	Georgia	State Rights	Charles Dougherty		32,727	48.58 / 100	2nd
1839	Rhode Island	Abolition	Tristam Burges		457	7.4 / 100	3rd
1841	Alabama	Independent Whig	James W. McLung		21,219	43.13 / 100	2nd
1841	Vermont	Liberty	Titus Hutchinson		3,039	6.34 / 100	3rd
1842	Maine	Liberty	James Appleton		4,080	5.68 / 100	3rd
1842	Massachusetts	Liberty	Samuel Sewall		6,382	5.41 / 100	3rd
1842	New Hampshire	Independent Democrat	John H. White		5,869	12.2 / 100	3rd
1842	New Hampshire	Liberty	Daniel Holt		2,812	5.85 / 100	4th
1843	Maine	Liberty	James Appleton		6,746	10.58 / 100	3rd
1843	Maine	Calhoun Democrat	Edward Kavanagh		3,221	5.05 / 100	4th
1843	Massachusetts	Liberty	Samuel Sewall		8,901	7.34 / 100	3rd
1843	Michigan	Liberty	James G. Birney		2,776	7.11 / 100	3rd
1843	New Hampshire	Conservative	John H. White		5,597	12.53 / 100	3rd
1843	New Hampshire	Liberty	Daniel Holt		3,392	7.59 / 100	4th
1843	Rhode Island	Law and Order	James Fenner		9,107	55.18 / 100	**1st**
1843	Vermont	Liberty	Charles K. Williams		5,618	10.24 / 100	3rd
1844	Arkansas	Independent	Richard C. Byrd		2,514	13.5 / 100	3rd
1844	Maine	Liberty	James Appleton		6,245	6.65 / 100	3rd
1844	Massachusetts	Liberty	Samuel Sewall		9,635	7.18 / 100	3rd
1844	New Hampshire	Liberty	Daniel Holt		5,767	11.84 / 100	3rd
1844	Rhode Island	Law and Order	James Fenner		5,560	96.39 / 100	**1st**
1844	Vermont	Liberty	William R. Shafter		5,618	10.24 / 100	3rd
1845	Alabama	Independent Democrat	Joshua L. Martin		30,261	53.55 / 100	**1st**
1845	Maine	Liberty	Samuel Fessenden		5,867	8.7 / 100	3rd
1845	Massachusetts	Liberty	Samuel Sewall		8,316	7.85 / 100	3rd
1845	Massachusetts	American	Henry Shaw		8,089	7.64 / 100	4th
1845	Michigan	Liberty	James G. Birney		3,065	7.76 / 100	3rd
1845	New Hampshire	Liberty	Daniel Holt		5,786	12.64 / 100	3rd
1845	Rhode Island	Liberation Party	Charles Jackson		8,007	50.48 / 100	**1st**
1845	Rhode Island	Law and Order	James Fenner		7,795	49.14 / 100	2nd
1845	Vermont	Liberty	William R. Shafter		6,534	13.54 / 100	3rd
1846	Illinois	Liberty	Richard Eels		5,154	5.11 / 100	3rd
1846	Maine	Liberty	Samuel Fessenden		9,398	12.42 / 100	3rd
1846	Massachusetts	Liberty	Samuel Sewall		9,997	9.81 / 100	3rd
1846	New Hampshire	Free Soil	Nathaniel S. Berry		10,403	18.76 / 100	3rd
1846	Rhode Island	Law and Order	Byron Diman		7,477	49.77 / 100	**1st**
1846	Vermont	Free Soil	Lawrence Brainerd		7,118	14.62 / 100	3rd
1847	Maine	Liberty	Samuel Fessenden		7,352	11.26 / 100	3rd
1847	Massachusetts	Liberty	Samuel Sewall		9,193	8.72 / 100	3rd
1847	Michigan	Liberty	Chester Gurney		2,585	5.59 / 100	3rd
1847	New Hampshire	Free Soil	Nathaniel S. Berry		8,531	14.1 / 100	3rd
1847	Vermont	Free Soil	Lawrence Brainerd		6,926	14.41 / 100	3rd
1848	Illinois	Free Soil	Charles V. Dyer		4,692	6.0 / 100	3rd
1848	Maine	Liberty	Samuel Fessenden		11,484	14.27 / 100	3rd
1848	Massachusetts	Free Soil	Stephen C. Phillips		36,011	29.03 / 100	2nd
1848	New York	Free Soil	John Adams Dix		122,811	26.7 / 100	2nd
1848	Vermont	Free Soil	Oscar Lovell Shafter		14,931	29.62 / 100	2nd
1849	Connecticut	Free Soil	John Milton Niles		3,520	6.25 / 100	3rd
1849	Maine	Free Soil	George F. Talbot		7,987	10.83 / 100	3rd
1849	Massachusetts	Free Soil	Stephen C. Phillips		25,247	23.06 / 100	3rd
1849	New Hampshire	Free Soil	Nathaniel S. Berry		7,045	12.57 / 100	3rd
1849	Rhode Island	Free Soil	Edward Harris		458	5.32 / 100	3rd
1849	Vermont	Free Soil	Horatio Needham		23,250	43.98 / 100	2nd
1849	Wisconsin	Free Soil	Warren Chase		3,761	11.85 / 100	3rd
1850	Maine	Free Soil	George F. Talbot		7,267	9.01 / 100	3rd
1850	Massachusetts	Free Soil	Stephen C. Phillips		27,636	22.77 / 100	3rd
1850	New Hampshire	Free Soil	Nathaniel S. Berry		6,472	11.6 / 100	3rd
1850	Ohio	Free Soil	Edward Smith		13,747	5.13 / 100	3rd
1850	Rhode Island	Free Soil	Edward Harris		773	16.89 / 100	2nd
1850	Vermont	Free Soil	Lucius Benedict Peck		18,856	39.69 / 100	2nd
1851	Georgia	Union	Howell Cobb		57,417	59.66 / 100	**1st**
1851	Georgia	Southern Rights	Charles James McDonald		38,824	40.34 / 100	2nd
1851	Massachusetts	Free Soil	John G. Palfrey		28,560	20.85 / 100	3rd
1851	Mississippi	Union	Henry S. Foote		29,358	50.87 / 100	**1st**
1851	Mississippi	Southern Rights	Jefferson Davis		28,359	49.14 / 100	2nd
1851	New Hampshire	Free Soil	John Atwood		12,049	20.73 / 100	3rd
1851	Ohio	Free Soil	Samuel Lewis		16,918	6.0 / 100	3rd
1851	Vermont	Free Soil	Timothy P. Redfield		14,950	33.71 / 100	2nd
1852	Illinois	Free Soil	D. A. Knowlton		9,024	5.85 / 100	3rd
1852	Maine	Anti-Maine Law	Anson G. Chandler		21,774	22.99 / 100	3rd
1852	Massachusetts	Free Soil	Horace Mann		36,740	26.54 / 100	3rd
1852	Michigan	Free Soil	Isaac P. Christiancy		6,350	7.58 / 100	3rd
1852	New Hampshire	Free Soil	John Atwood		9,683	15.78 / 100	3rd
1852	Vermont	Free Soil	Lawrence Brainerd		9,446	19.6 / 100	3rd
1853	Alabama	Union	Alvis Q. Nicks		5,763	12.37 / 100	3rd
1853	Connecticut	Free Soil	Francis Gillette		8,926	14.78 / 100	3rd
1853	Georgia	Southern Rights	Herschel Vespasian Johnson		47,638	50.27 / 100	**1st**
1853	Georgia	Union	Charles J. Jenkins		47,128	49.73 / 100	2nd
1853	Maine	Anti-Maine Law	Anson Morrill		11,027	13.19 / 100	3rd
1853	Maine	Free Soil	Ezekial Holmes		8,996	10.76 / 100	4th
1853	Massachusetts	Free Soil	Henry Wilson		29,020	22.51 / 100	3rd
1853	New Hampshire	Free Soil	John H. White		7,997	14.14 / 100	3rd
1853	Ohio	Free Soil	Samuel Lewis		50,346	17.74 / 100	3rd
1853	Vermont	Free Soil	Lawrence Brainerd		8,291	17.49 / 100	3rd
1854	Connecticut	Temperance	Charles Chapman		10,672	17.49 / 100	3rd
1854	Delaware	American	Peter F. Causey		6,941	52.64 / 100	**1st**
1854	Maine	American	Anson Morrill		44,565	49.17 / 100	**1st**
1854	Massachusetts	American	Henry Gardner		81,503	62.58 / 100	**1st**
1854	New Hampshire	Free Soil	Jared Perkins		11,080	19.13 / 100	3rd
1854	New York	American	Daniel Ullman		122,282	26.05 / 100	3rd
1854	New York	Hard-Shell	Greene C. Bronson		33,850	7.21 / 100	4th
1855	Alabama	American	George D. Shortridge		32,086	42.21 / 100	2nd
1855	California	American	J. Neely Johnson		51,157	52.53 / 100	**1st**
1855	Connecticut	American	William T. Minor		28,080	43.51 / 100	**1st**
1855	Georgia	American	Garnett Andrews		43,358	41.76 / 100	2nd
1855	Georgia	Temperance	B. H. Overby		6,331	6.1 / 100	3rd
1855	Kentucky	American	Charles S. Morehead		69,816	51.63 / 100	**1st**
1855	Louisiana	American	Charles Derbigny		19,755	46.26 / 100	2nd
1855	Massachusetts	American	Henry Gardner		51,497	37.73 / 100	**1st**
1855	Mississippi	American	Charles D. Fontaine		27,579	45.78 / 100	2nd
1855	New Hampshire	American	Ralph Metcalf		32,779	50.71 / 100	**1st**
1855	Ohio	American	Allen Trimble		24,276	8.04 / 100	3rd
1855	Texas	American	D. C. Dickson		18,968	40.93 / 100	2nd
1855	Vermont	American	James M. Slade		3,631	8.33 / 100	3rd
1855	Virginia	American	Thomas Flournoy		73,354	46.83 / 100	2nd
1856	Arkansas	American	James Yell		15,249	35.58 / 100	2nd
1856	Connecticut	American	William T. Minor		26,008	38.99 / 100	2nd
1856	Florida	American	David S. Walker		5,894	48.68 / 100	2nd
1856	Illinois	American	Buckner Stith Morris		19,088	8.04 / 100	3rd
1856	Indiana	People's (Note: The People's Party was one of the common designations used by some State Republican Parties between 1854 and 1860.)	Oliver P. Morton		112,039	48.71 / 100	2nd
1856	Massachusetts	Fillmore American	George W. Gordon		10,385	6.62 / 100	3rd
1856	Missouri	American	Robert C. Ewing		40,589	35.23 / 100	2nd
1856	Missouri	Benton Democrat	Thomas Hart Benton		27,618	23.97 / 100	3rd
1856	New Hampshire	American	Ralph Metcalf		32,119	48.15 / 100	**1st**
1856	New York	American	Erastus Brooks		130,870	22.04 / 100	3rd
1856	North Carolina	American	John Adams Gilmer		44,970	43.8 / 100	2nd
1857	California	American	George Washington Bowie		19,481	20.8 / 100	3rd
1857	Georgia	American	Benjamin Harvey Hill		46,889	44.86 / 100	2nd
1857	Maryland	American	Thomas Holliday Hicks		47,141	54.93 / 100	**1st**
1857	Massachusetts	American	Henry Gardner		37,596	28.81 / 100	2nd
1857	Mississippi	American	Edward M. Yerger		14,095	33.99 / 100	2nd
1857	Missouri	American	James S. Rollins		47,641	49.83 / 100	2nd
1857	Pennsylvania	American	Isaac Hazlehurst		28,168	7.76 / 100	3rd
1857	Tennessee	American	Robert H. Hatton		59,807	45.56 / 100	2nd
1857	Texas	American	Sam Houston		23,628	42.06 / 100	2nd
1858	Delaware	People's	James S. Buckmaster		7,554	49.33 / 100	2nd
1858	Massachusetts	American	Amos Adams Lawrence		12,084	10.13 / 100	3rd
1858	New York	American	Lorenzo Burrows		61,137	11.22 / 100	3rd
1858	North Carolina	Independent Democrat	Duncan K. McRae		40,036	41.5 / 100	2nd
1859	Alabama	Southern Rights Democratic	William F. Samford		19,745	27.22 / 100	2nd
1859	California	Lecompton Democrat	Milton Latham		61,352	59.7 / 100	**1st**
1859	Kentucky	Opposition	Joshua Fry Bell		67,283	46.9 / 100	2nd
1859	Louisiana	American	Thomas J. Wells		15,587	37.98 / 100	2nd
1859	Massachusetts	American	George N. Briggs		14,365	13.2 / 100	3rd
1859	Mississippi	Independent	Harvey W. Walter		10,308	22.98 / 100	2nd
1859	Tennessee	Opposition	John H. Netherland		68,040	47.21 / 100	2nd
1859	Texas	Constitutional Union	Sam Houston		36,227	56.79 / 100	**1st**
1859	Virginia	Opposition	William L. Goggin		71,592	48.11 / 100	2nd
1860	Arkansas	Independent Democrat	Henry Massey Rector		32,048	52.52 / 100	**1st**
1860	Massachusetts	Constitutional Union	Amos Adams Lawrence		23,816	14.04 / 100	3rd
1860	Missouri	Constitutional Union	Sample Orr		66,583	41.99 / 100	2nd
1860	Missouri	Breckinridge Democrat	Hancock Lee Jackson		11,415	7.2 / 100	3rd
1861	California	Breckinridge Democrat	John R. McConnell		32,751	27.35 / 100	2nd
1861	Maine	Opposition Democrat	John W. Dana		19,383	19.77 / 100	3rd
1861	Vermont	Union People's	Andrew Tracy		5,722	13.37 / 100	2nd
1862	Massachusetts	People's	Charles Devens		54,167	39.91 / 100	2nd
1863	New Hampshire	Union	Walter Harriman		4,372	6.56 / 100	3rd
1864	Louisiana	Independent	J. Q. Fellows		2,720	25.36 / 100	2nd
1864	Louisiana	Radical Republican	Benjamin Flanders		1,847	17.22 / 100	3rd
1864	Rhode Island	Independent Republican	Amos C. Barstow		1,339	7.64 / 100	3rd
1865	Alabama	Whig	Robert M. Patton		20,611	45.21 / 100	**1st**
1865	Alabama	Union	William Russell Smith		8,557	18.77 / 100	3rd
1865	Louisiana	Independent	Henry Watkins Allen		6,297	21.84 / 100	2nd
1865	North Carolina	Conservative	Jonathan Worth		32,549	55.49 / 100	**1st**
1865	South Carolina	Independent	James Lawrence Orr		9,771	51.75 / 100	**1st**
1865	South Carolina	Independent	Wade Hampton III		9,109	48.25 / 100	2nd
1866	North Carolina	Conservative	Jonathan Worth		34,250	75.87 / 100	**1st**
1867	Kentucky	Conservative	William B. Kinkead		13,167	9.59 / 100	3rd
1867	Tennessee	Conservative	Emerson Etheridge		22,440	23.15 / 100	2nd
1868	Florida	Radical Republican	Samuel Walker		2,251	9.22 / 100	3rd
1868	Louisiana	White Republican	James G. Taliaferro		38,118	37.23 / 100	2nd
1868	North Carolina	Conservative	Thomas Samuel Ashe		73,600	44.28 / 100	2nd
1869	Maine	Temperance	Nathan Griffin Hichborn		5,028	5.28 / 100	3rd
1869	Massachusetts	Labor Reform	Edwin M. Chamberlain		13,567	9.8 / 100	3rd
1869	Mississippi	Conservative	Louis Dent		38,097	33.34 / 100	2nd
1869	Tennessee	Radical Republican	William Brickly Stokes		55,036	31.38 / 100	2nd
1869	Virginia	Conservative	Gilbert Carlton Walker		119,535	54.15 / 100	**1st**
1869	Virginia	Radical Republican	Henry H. Wells		101,204	45.85 / 100	2nd
1870	Massachusetts	Labor Reform	Wendell Phillips		21,946	14.59 / 100	3rd
1870	Missouri	Liberal Republican	Benjamin Gratz Brown		104,374	62.27 / 100	**1st**
1870	New Hampshire	Labor Reform	Samuel Flint		7,369	10.76 / 100	3rd
1871	Massachusetts	Labor Reform	Edwin M. Chamberlain		6,848	5.01 / 100	3rd
1872	Alabama	Liberal Republican	T. Hendon		81,371	47.52 / 100	2nd
1872	Arkansas	Liberal Republican	Joseph Brooks		38,909	48.2 / 100	2nd
1872	Florida	Liberal Republican	William D. Bloxham		16,004	47.62 / 100	2nd
1872	Georgia	Liberal Republican	James Milton Smith		104,539	69.23 / 100	**1st**
1872	Illinois	Liberal Republican	Gustav Koerner		197,084	45.1 / 100	2nd
1872	Kansas	Liberal Republican	Thaddeus H. Walker		34,698	34.22 / 100	2nd
1872	Massachusetts	Liberal Republican	Francis W. Bird		59,626	30.77 / 100	2nd
1872	Michigan	Liberal Republican	Austin Blair		80,598	36.27 / 100	2nd
1872	North Carolina	Conservative	Augustus Summerfield Merrimon		96,731	49.51 / 100	2nd
1872	South Carolina	Independent Republican	Reuben Tomlinson		36,553	34.36 / 100	2nd
1872	Tennessee	Liberal Republican	John C. Brown		97,689	53.74 / 100	**1st**
1872	West Virginia	People's Independent	John J. Jacob		42,888	51.55 / 100	**1st**
1873	Iowa	Anti-Monopoly	Jacob G. Vale		82,556	43.61 / 100	2nd
1873	Mississippi	Independent	James L. Alcorn		52,857	41.89 / 100	2nd
1874	Connecticut	Temperance	Henry D. Smith		4,960	5.4 / 100	3rd
1874	Nebraska	Greenback Party	J. F. Gardner		4,159	11.55 / 100	3rd
1874	Oregon	Independent	Thomas F. Campbell		6,532	25.71 / 100	3rd
1874	South Carolina	Independent Republican	John T. Green		68,818	46.12 / 100	2nd
1875	California	Independent	John Bidwell		29,752	24.2 / 100	3rd
1875	Iowa	Anti-Monopoly	Shepherd Leffler		93,270	42.61 / 100	2nd
1875	Massachusetts	Temperance	John I. Baker		9,124	5.27 / 100	3rd
1875	Rhode Island	National Republican	Rowland Hazard, II		8,368	37.56 / 100	2nd
1876	Nebraska	Greenback Party	J. F. Gardner		3,022	5.79 / 100	3rd
1876	Rhode Island	National Republican	Albert C. Howard		6,733	35.37 / 100	2nd
1876	Tennessee	Independent	Dorsey B. Thomas		73,695	35.09 / 100	2nd
1877	Iowa	Greenback Party	Daniel P. Stubbs		34,316	13.97 / 100	3rd
1877	Maine	Greenback Party	Henry C. Munson		5,291	5.18 / 100	3rd
1877	Massachusetts	Prohibition	Robert C. Pitman		16,354	8.87 / 100	3rd
1877	Wisconsin	Greenback Party	Edward P. Allis		26,216	14.72 / 100	3rd
1878	Colorado	Greenback Party	R. G. Buckingham		2,783	9.72 / 100	3rd
1878	Connecticut	Greenback Party	Charles Atwater		8,314	7.94 / 100	3rd
1878	Delaware	Greenback Party	K. Stewart		2,835	20.9 / 100	2nd
1878	Kansas	Greenback Party	David P. Mitchell		27,057	19.57 / 100	3rd
1878	Maine	Greenback Party	Joseph L. Smith		41,371	32.79 / 100	2nd
1878	Michigan	Greenback Party	Henry S. Smith		73,313	25.93 / 100	3rd
1878	Nebraska	Greenback Party	Levi G. Todd		9,484	18.16 / 100	3rd
1878	New Hampshire	Greenback Party	Warren G. Brown		6,507	8.57 / 100	3rd
1878	Pennsylvania	Greenback Party	Samuel R. Mason		81,758	11.65 / 100	3rd
1878	Tennessee	Greenback Party	R. M. Edwards		15,470	10.47 / 100	3rd
1878	Texas	Greenback Party	William H. Hamman		55,002	23.2 / 100	2nd
1879	California	Workingmen's	William F. White		44,482	27.76 / 100	3rd
1879	Iowa	Greenback Party	Daniel Campbell		45,674	15.65 / 100	3rd
1879	Kentucky	Greenback Party	Charles W. Cook		18,954	8.38 / 100	3rd
1879	Maine	Greenback Party	Joseph L. Smith		47,987	34.68 / 100	2nd
1879	New York	Jeffersonian	John Kelly		77,566	8.65 / 100	3rd
1879	Wisconsin	Greenback Party	Reuben May		12,996	6.88 / 100	3rd
1880	Alabama	Greenback Party	James Madison Pickens		42,363	23.9 / 100	2nd
1880	Arkansas	Greenback Party	W. Parks		31,424	27.18 / 100	2nd
1880	Georgia	Independent Democrat	Thomas M. Norwood		63,631	35.07 / 100	2nd
1880	Kansas	Greenback Party	H. P. Vrooman		19,481	9.8 / 100	3rd
1880	Maine	Fusion	Harris M. Plaisted		73,713	49.48 / 100	**1st**
1880	Michigan	Greenback Party	David Woodman		31,085	8.9 / 100	3rd
1880	Missouri	Greenback Party	Luman A. Brown		36,340	9.14 / 100	3rd
1880	Rhode Island	Independent Republican	Albert C. Howard		5,047	22.13 / 100	3rd
1880	Tennessee	Debt-Paying Democrat	William B. Bate		79,081	32.38 / 100	2nd
1880	Tennessee	Low Tax Democrat	William B. Bate		57,568	23.57 / 100	3rd
1880	Texas	Greenback Party	William H. Hamman		33,721	12.76 / 100	3rd
1880	West Virginia	Greenback Party	N. B. French		13,027	10.96 / 100	3rd
1881	Iowa	Greenback Party	David M. Clark		28,112	11.96 / 100	3rd
1881	Mississippi	Fusion	Benjamin King		51,994	40.37 / 100	2nd
1881	Virginia	Readjuster	William E. Cameron		113,464	52.97 / 100	**1st**
1881	Wisconsin	Prohibition	Theodore D. Kanouse		13,225	7.7 / 100	3rd
1882	Arkansas	Greenback Party	Rufus King Garland Jr.		10,142	6.89 / 100	3rd
1882	Georgia	Independent Democrat	Lucius Jeremiah Gartrell		44,893	29.43 / 100	2nd
1882	Kansas	Greenback Party	Charles L. Robinson		20,933	11.67 / 100	3rd
1882	Massachusetts	Fusion	Benjamin Butler		133,946	52.27 / 100	**1st**
1882	Michigan	Fusion	Josiah Begole		154,269	49.42 / 100	**1st**
1882	Nebraska	Greenback Party	E. P. Ingersoll		16,991	19.08 / 100	3rd
1882	Pennsylvania	Independent Republican	John Stewart		43,743	5.88 / 100	3rd
1882	South Carolina	Greenback Party	J. H. McLane		17,319	20.5 / 100	2nd
1882	Tennessee	Low Tax Democrat	William B. Bate		120,091	52.73 / 100	**1st**
1882	Texas	Fusion	George Wallace Jones		102,501	40.41 / 100	2nd
1883	Iowa	Greenback Party	James B. Weaver		23,089	7.06 / 100	3rd
1883	Massachusetts	Fusion	Benjamin Butler		150,228	48.1 / 100	2nd
1884	Massachusetts	Greenback Party	Matthew J. McCafferty		24,363	8.01 / 100	3rd
1884	Michigan	Fusion	Josiah Begole		186,887	46.68 / 100	2nd
1884	Michigan	Prohibition	David Preston		22,207	5.55 / 100	3rd
1884	Texas	Greenback Party	George Washington Jones		88,450	27.11 / 100	2nd
1885	Rhode Island	Prohibition	Gordon H. Slade		1,206	5.37 / 100	3rd
1886	Arkansas	Agricultural Wheel	Charles E. Cunningham		19,169	11.7 / 100	3rd
1886	California	Independent	Charles C. O'Donnell		12,227	6.25 / 100	3rd
1886	Delaware	Temperance Reform	John H. Hoffecker		7,835	35.75 / 100	2nd
1886	Michigan	Fusion	George L. Yaple		174,042	45.69 / 100	2nd
1886	Michigan	Prohibition	Samuel Dickie		25,179	6.61 / 100	3rd
1886	Nebraska	Prohibition	H. W. Hardy		8,198	5.92 / 100	3rd
1886	New Jersey	Prohibition	Clinton B. Fisk		19,808	8.55 / 100	3rd
1886	Rhode Island	Prohibition	Gordon H. Slade		2,585	9.6 / 100	3rd
1886	Texas	Prohibition	E. L. Dahoney		19,186	6.12 / 100	3rd
1886	Wisconsin	People's	John Cochrane		21,467	7.5 / 100	3rd
1887	Rhode Island	Prohibition	Thomas H. Peabody		1,895	5.39 / 100	3rd
1888	Arkansas	Union Labor	C. M. Norwood		84,223	45.91 / 100	2nd
1888	Kansas	Union Labor	P. P. Elder		35,847	10.84 / 100	3rd
1888	Michigan	Fusion	Wellington R. Burt		216,450	45.59 / 100	2nd
1888	Minnesota	Prohibition	Hugh G. Harrison		17,026	6.51 / 100	3rd
1888	Texas	Fusion	Marion Martin		98,447	28.23 / 100	2nd
1889	Massachusetts	Prohibition	Joseph Blackmer		15,108	5.74 / 100	3rd
1889	Rhode Island	Law Enforcement	James Chace		3,596	8.34 / 100	3rd
1890	Arkansas	Union Labor	N. B. Fizer		85,181	44.49 / 100	2nd
1890	Colorado	Union Labor	John G. Coy		5,199	6.23 / 100	3rd
1890	Kansas	People's	John F. Willits		106,945	36.31 / 100	2nd
1890	Michigan	Prohibition	Azariah S. Partridge		28,681	7.21 / 100	3rd
1890	Minnesota	Alliance	Sidney M. Owen		58,513	24.29 / 100	3rd
1890	Nebraska	People's Independent	J. H. Powers		70,187	32.78 / 100	2nd
1890	North Dakota	Alliance	Walter Muir		4,821	13.22 / 100	3rd
1890	South Carolina	Independent Democrat	A. C. Haskell		14,828	20.04 / 100	2nd
1890	South Dakota	Independent	H. L. Loucks		24,591	31.71 / 100	2nd
1890	Tennessee	Prohibition	D. Kelley		11,082	5.52 / 100	3rd
1891	Kentucky	People's	S. B. Erwin		25,631	8.86 / 100	3rd
1892	Alabama	Independent Democrat	R. F. Kolb		115,732	47.58 / 100	2nd
1892	Arkansas	People's	J. P. Carnahan		31,116	19.92 / 100	3rd
1892	Colorado	People's	Davis Hanson Waite		43,342	46.68 / 100	**1st**
1892	Florida	People's	Alonzo P. Baskin		8,379	20.57 / 100	2nd
1892	Georgia	People's	W. Peck		68,093	33.28 / 100	2nd
1892	Idaho	People's	Abraham J. Crook		4,865	24.23 / 100	3rd
1892	Kansas	People's	Lorenzo D. Lewelling		162,507	50.04 / 100	**1st**
1892	Louisiana	Anti-Lottery Democrat	Murphy J. Foster		79,407	44.54 / 100	**1st**
1892	Louisiana	Independent Republican	John E. Breaux		12,409	6.96 / 100	4th
1892	Louisiana	People's	R. H. Tannehill		9,792	5.49 / 100	5th
1892	Minnesota	People's	Ignatius L. Donnelly		39,862	15.58 / 100	3rd
1892	Missouri	People's	Leverett Leonard		37,262	6.89 / 100	3rd
1892	Nebraska	People's Independent	Charles Van Wyck		68,617	34.75 / 100	2nd
1892	Montana	People's	William Kennedy		7,794	17.64 / 100	3rd
1892	North Carolina	People's	Wyatt P. Exum		47,747	17.04 / 100	3rd
1892	North Dakota	People's	Eli C. D. Shortridge		18,995	52.43 / 100	**1st**
1892	South Dakota	Independent	A. L. Van Osdel		22,323	31.71 / 100	2nd
1892	Tennessee	People's	John P. Buchanan		31,515	11.95 / 100	3rd
1892	Texas	Independent Democrat	George Clark		133,395	30.63 / 100	2nd
1892	Texas	People's	Thomas L. Nugent		108,483	24.91 / 100	3rd
1892	Washington	People's	Cyrus W. Young		23,750	26.41 / 100	3rd
1893	Iowa	People's	J. M. Joseph		23,980	5.77 / 100	3rd
1893	Rhode Island	Prohibition	Henry B. Metcalf		3,265	6.93 / 100	3rd
1893	Virginia	People's	Edmund R. Cocke		79,653	37.09 / 100	2nd
1894	Alabama	People's	R. F. Kolb		83,292	42.9 / 100	2nd
1894	Arkansas	People's	D. E. Barker		24,181	19.1 / 100	3rd
1894	California	People's	J. V. Webster		51,304	18.03 / 100	3rd
1894	Colorado	People's	Davis Hanson Waite		73,894	41.06 / 100	2nd
1894	Georgia	People's	J. K. Hines		96,990	44.44 / 100	2nd
1894	Idaho	People's	James W. Ballantine		7,121	28.96 / 100	2nd
1894	Kansas	People's	Lorenzo D. Lewelling		118,329	39.41 / 100	2nd
1894	Michigan	People's	Alva W. Nichols		30,012	7.2 / 100	3rd
1894	Minnesota	People's	Sidney M. Owen		87,890	29.67 / 100	2nd
1894	Nebraska	Fusion	Silas A. Holcomb		97,825	47.97 / 100	**1st**
1894	Nevada	Silver	John Edward Jones		5,223	49.87 / 100	**1st**
1894	Nevada	People's	George Peckham		711	6.79 / 100	3rd
1894	North Dakota	People's	Elmer D. Wallace		9,354	21.99 / 100	2nd
1894	Oregon	People's	Nathan Pierce		26,125	29.99 / 100	2nd
1894	South Carolina	People's	Sampson Pope		17,278	30.43 / 100	2nd
1894	South Dakota	People's	Isaac Howe		27,568	35.46 / 100	2nd
1894	Tennessee	People's	A. L. Mims		23,092	11.0 / 100	3rd
1894	Texas	People's	Thomas L. Nugent		152,731	36.13 / 100	2nd
1894	Wisconsin	People's	D. Frank Powell		25,604	6.82 / 100	3rd
1894	Wyoming	People's	Lewis C. Tidball		2,176	11.28 / 100	3rd
1895	Iowa	People's	Sylvester B. Crane		32,189	8.02 / 100	3rd
1895	Mississippi	People's	Frank Burkett		18,167	27.93 / 100	2nd
1895	Ohio	People's	Jacob S. Coxey Sr.		52,675	6.29 / 100	3rd
1895	Rhode Island	Prohibition	Smith Quimby		2,624	5.95 / 100	3rd
1896	Alabama	People's	Albert Taylor Goodwyn		89,290	40.99 / 100	2nd
1896	Arkansas	People's	Abner W. Files		13,980	9.86 / 100	3rd
1896	Colorado	People's	M. S. Bailey		71,808	37.98 / 100	2nd
1896	Delaware	Union Republican (Note: Fusion of Union (Addicks) Republicans and the National Prohibition Party)	John H. Hoffecker		11,014	31.35 / 100	2nd
1896	Florida	People's	W. A. Wicks		5,370	13.15 / 100	3rd
1896	Georgia	People's	Seaborn Wright		85,981	41.1 / 100	2nd
1896	Idaho	Fusion	Frank Steunenberg		22,096	76.79 / 100	**1st**
1896	Kansas	People's	John W. Leedy		167,941	50.55 / 100	**1st**
1896	Louisiana	Fusion	John N. Pharr		87,698	42.99 / 100	2nd
1896	Michigan	Democratic People's Union Silver	Charles Robert Sligh		221,022	40.35 / 100	2nd
1896	Minnesota	Democratic People's	John Lind		162,254	48.1 / 100	2nd
1896	Montana	People's	Robert Burns Smith		36,688	70.99 / 100	**1st**
1896	Nebraska	Fusion	Silas A. Holcomb		116,415	53.46 / 100	**1st**
1896	North Carolina	People's	William A. Guthrie		30,943	9.35 / 100	3rd
1896	North Dakota	People's	Robert B. Richardson		20,690	44.39 / 100	2nd
1896	Rhode Island	Prohibition	Thomas H. Peabody		2,950	5.84 / 100	3rd
1896	South Carolina	Lily-White Republican	Sampson Pope		4,432	6.65 / 100	2nd
1896	South Dakota	People's	Andrew E. Lee		41,177	49.75 / 100	**1st**
1896	Texas	People's	Jerome Claiborne Kearby		238,325	44.18 / 100	2nd
1896	Washington	Fusion	John Rankin Rogers		50,849	55.55 / 100	**1st**
1897	Massachusetts	National Democratic	William Everett		13,879	5.14 / 100	3rd
1897	Rhode Island	Prohibition	Thomas H. Peabody		2,096	5.01 / 100	3rd
1898	Alabama	People's	Gilbert B. Dean		50,052	30.32 / 100	2nd
1898	Arkansas	People's	W. S. Morgan		8,332	7.45 / 100	3rd
1898	Colorado	Fusion	Charles S. Thomas		93,966	62.89 / 100	**1st**
1898	Georgia	People's	J. Hogan		51,191	30.25 / 100	2nd
1898	Idaho	Fusion	Frank Steunenberg		19,407	48.83 / 100	**1st**
1898	Idaho	People's	James H. Henderson		5,371	13.51 / 100	3rd
1898	Kansas	People's	John W. Leedy		134,158	46.55 / 100	2nd
1898	Michigan	Democratic People's Union Silver	Justin Rice Whiting		168,142	39.92 / 100	2nd
1898	Minnesota	Democratic People's	John Lind		131,980	52.26 / 100	**1st**
1898	Nebraska	Fusion	William A. Poynter		95,703	50.19 / 100	**1st**
1898	Nevada	Silver	Reinhold Sadler		3,570	35.67 / 100	**1st**
1898	Nevada	People's	J. B. McCullough		833	8.32 / 100	4th
1898	North Dakota	Fusion	David M. Holmes		19,496	40.78 / 100	2nd
1898	Pennsylvania	Prohibition	Silas C. Swallow		132,931	13.68 / 100	3rd
1898	Rhode Island	Socialist Labor	James P. Reid		2,877	6.71 / 100	3rd
1898	South Dakota	Fusion	Andrew E. Lee		37,319	49.63 / 100	**1st**
1898	Texas	People's	Barnett Gibbs		114,955	28.07 / 100	2nd
1899	Mississippi	People's	R. K. Prewitt		6,097	12.61 / 100	2nd
1899	Ohio	Independent	Samuel M. Jones		106,721	11.75 / 100	3rd
1899	Rhode Island	Socialist Labor	Thomas Herrick		2,941	6.82 / 100	3rd
1900	Alabama	People's	Grattan B. Crowe		17,444	10.84 / 100	3rd of 3
1900	Georgia	People's	George W. Trayler		25,285	21.43 / 100	2nd of 2
1900	Kansas	People's	John W. Breidenthal		164,793	47.33 / 100	2nd of 4
1900	Louisiana	Fusion (Note: While Caffery was listed as running on a Fusion ticket, the nature of the electoral alliance was not yet determined.)	Donelson Caffery		14,215	18.49 / 100	3rd of 3
1900	Minnesota	Democratic People's (Note: A fusion of the state Democratic and Peoples' Parties)	John Lind		150,651	47.95 / 100	2nd of 4
1900	Montana	Independent Democratic	Thomas S. Hogan		9,188	14.4 / 100	3rd of 4
1900	Nebraska	Fusion (Note: An electoral alliance between the state Democratic and Peoples' Parties)	William A. Poynter		113,018	48.51 / 100	2nd of 5
1900	North Dakota	Fusion	M. Wipperman		22,275	38.72 / 100	2nd of 5
1900	Rhode Island	Socialist Labor	James P. Reid		2,858	5.96 / 100	3rd of 4
1900	South Dakota	Fusion	Burre H. Lien		40,091	41.97 / 100	2nd of 4
1900	Texas	People's	T. J. McMinn		26,579	5.92 / 100	3rd of 6
1902	Arkansas	Independent Republican	Charles D. Greaves		8,345	6.97 / 100	3rd of 4
1902	Georgia	People's	J. K. Hines		5,566	6.39 / 100	2nd of 2
1902	Massachusetts	Socialist	John C. Chase		33,629	8.44 / 100	3rd of 5
1902	Nebraska	Fusion	William Henry Thompson		91,116	46.79 / 100	2nd of 4
1902	Nevada	Silver-Democratic (Note: A Fusion of the state Democratic and Silver Parties)	John Sparks		6,540	57.78 / 100	**Elected**
1902	Vermont	Local Option (Note: A short-lived party formed by Anti-Prohibition Republicans which desired to see Prohibition legislated at the local level rather than at the state level.)	Percival W. Clement		28,201	40.33 / 100	2nd of 4
1903	Massachusetts	Socialist	John C. Chase		25,251	6.37 / 100	3rd of 5
1904	Idaho	Socialist	Theodore B. Shaw		4,000	5.61 / 100	3rd of 5
1904	Illinois	Socialist	John Collins		59,062	5.51 / 100	3rd of 7
1904	Montana	Socialist	Malcolm A. O'Malley		3,431	5.22 / 100	3rd of 3
1904	Nebraska	Fusion	George W. Berge		102,568	45.61 / 100	2nd of 4
1904	Utah	American	William Montague Ferry		7,959	7.82 / 100	3rd of 4
1904	Washington	Socialist	David Burgess		7,420	5.13 / 100	3rd of 5
1904	Wisconsin	Social-Democratic (Note: State affiliate of the Socialist Party)	William A. Arnold		24,857	5.53 / 100	3rd of 5
1906	California	Independence League	William H. Langdon		45,008	14.43 / 100	3rd of 5
1906	California	Socialist	Austin Lewis		16,036	5.14 / 100	4th of 5
1906	Colorado	Independent	Ben Lindsey		18,014	8.87 / 100	3rd of 5
1906	Colorado	Socialist	Bill Haywood		16,015	7.88 / 100	4th of 5
1906	Idaho	Socialist	Thomas F. Kelley		4,650	6.32 / 100	3rd of 3
1906	Nebraska	Fusion	Ashton C. Shallenberger		84,885	44.48 / 100	2nd of 4
1906	Nevada	Silver-Democratic	John Sparks		8,686	58.54 / 100	**Re-elected**
1906	Nevada	Socialist	Thomas B. Casey		815	5.49 / 100	3rd of 3
1906	Vermont	Independent	Percival W. Clement		26,912	38.18 / 100	2nd of 4
1907	Massachusetts	Independence League	Thomas L. Hisgen		75,499	20.2 / 100	3rd of 7
1908	Florida	Socialist	A. J. Pettigrew		2,427	5.79 / 100	3rd of 3
1908	Georgia	Independent	Yancy Carter		11,746	9.47 / 100	2nd of 2
1908	Idaho	Socialist	Ernest Untermann		6,155	6.38 / 100	3rd of 5
1908	Massachusetts	Independence League	William N. Osgood		23,101	5.22 / 100	3rd of 6
1908	Montana	Socialist	Harry Hazelton		5,122	7.5 / 100	3rd of 3
1908	Nebraska	Fusion	Ashton C. Shallenberger		132,960	49.9 / 100	**Elected**
1908	Utah	American	John A. Street		11,404	10.23 / 100	3rd of 4
1908	Wisconsin	Social-Democratic	H. D. Brown		28,583	6.36 / 100	3rd of 5
1910	Arkansas	Socialist	Dan Hogan		9,196	6.1 / 100	3rd of 3
1910	California	Socialist	Jackson Stitt Wilson		47,819	12.4 / 100	3rd of 3
1910	Connecticut	Socialist	Robert Hunter		12,179	7.33 / 100	3rd of 5
1910	Idaho	Socialist	S. W. Motley		5,342	6.2 / 100	3rd of 3
1910	Nevada	Socialist	Henry F. Gegax		1,393	6.75 / 100	3rd of 3
1910	Ohio	Socialist	Tom Clifford		60,637	6.56 / 100	3rd of 5
1910	Oklahoma	Socialist	J. T. Cumbie		24,457	9.91 / 100	3rd of 4
1910	Oregon	Socialist	W. S. Richards		8,040	6.83 / 100	3rd of 4
1910	Oregon	Prohibition	A. E. Eaton		6,046	5.14 / 100	4th of 4
1910	Pennsylvania	Keystone	William H. Berry		382,127	38.27 / 100	2nd of 6
1910	Texas	Socialist	Reddin Andrews		11,538	5.27 / 100	3rd of 5
1910	Wisconsin	Social-Democratic	William A. Jacobs		39,547	12.38 / 100	3rd of 5
1911	Arizona	Socialist	P. W. Gallentine		1,247	5.77 / 100	3rd of 4
1912	Arkansas	Socialist	G. E. Mikel		13,384	7.89 / 100	3rd of 3
1912	Colorado	Progressive	Edward P. Costigan		66,132	24.88 / 100	2nd of 6
1912	Colorado	Socialist	Charles A. Ashelstrom		16,189	6.09 / 100	4th of 6
1912	Connecticut	Progressive	Herbert Smith		31,020	16.29 / 100	3rd of 6
1912	Connecticut	Socialist	Samuel E. Beardsley		10,236	5.38 / 100	4th of 6
1912	Delaware	Progressive	George Beswick Hynson		3,019	6.23 / 100	3rd of 5
1912	Florida	Socialist	Thomas W. Cox		3,467	7.15 / 100	2nd of 5
1912	Idaho	Progressive	G. H. Martin		24,325	23.05 / 100	3rd of 4
1912	Idaho	Socialist	L. A. Coblentz		11,094	10.51 / 100	4th of 4
1912	Illinois	Progressive	Frank H. Funk		303,401	26.09 / 100	3rd of 6
1912	Illinois	Socialist	John C. Kennedy		78,679	6.77 / 100	4th of 4
1912	Indiana	Progressive	Albert J. Beveridge		166,654	25.99 / 100	2nd of 6
1912	Indiana	Socialist	Stephen N. Reynolds		35,464	5.53 / 100	4th of 6
1912	Iowa	Progressive	John L. Stevens		71,879	15.59 / 100	3rd of 5
1912	Kansas	Socialist	George W. Kleihege		24,767	6.89 / 100	3rd of 3
1912	Massachusetts	Progressive	Charles S. Bird		126,602	26.39 / 100	3rd of 6
1912	Michigan	Progressive	L. Whitney Watkins		155,372	28.31 / 100	3rd of 6
1912	Minnesota	Progressive	Paul V. Collins		33,455	10.51 / 100	3rd of 5
1912	Minnesota	Prohibition	Engebret E. Lobeck		29,876	9.38 / 100	4th of 5
1912	Minnesota	Public Ownership	David Morgan		25,769	8.09 / 100	5th of 5
1912	Missouri	Progressive	Albert D. Nortoni		109,146	15.61 / 100	3rd of 6
1912	Montana	Progressive	Frank J. Edwards		18,881	23.61 / 100	3rd of 4
1912	Montana	Socialist	Lewis J. Duncan		12,766	15.96 / 100	4th of 4
1912	New Hampshire	Progressive	Winston Churchill		14,401	17.29 / 100	3rd of 5
1912	New York	Progressive	Oscar Straus		393,183	25.1 / 100	3rd of 6
1912	North Carolina	Progressive	Iredell Meares		49,930	20.42 / 100	2nd of 4
1912	North Dakota	Progressive	W. D. Sweet		9,406	10.74 / 100	3rd of 4
1912	North Dakota	Socialist	A. E. Bowen Jr.		6,835	7.8 / 100	4th of 4
1912	Ohio	Progressive	Arthur Lovett Garford		217,903	21.02 / 100	3rd of 6
1912	Ohio	Socialist	Charles Emil Ruthenberg		87,709	8.46 / 100	4th of 6
1912	Rhode Island	Progressive	Albert H. Humes		8,457	10.82 / 100	3rd of 6
1912	Texas	Socialist	Reddin Andrews		25,258	8.39 / 100	2nd of 6
1912	Texas	Progressive	Ed C. Lasater		15,794	5.24 / 100	4th of 6
1912	Utah	Progressive	Nephi L. Morris		23,591	21.16 / 100	3rd of 5
1912	Utah	Socialist	Homer P. Burt		8,797	7.89 / 100	4th of 5
1912	Vermont	Progressive	Fraser Metzger		15,629	24.1 / 100	3rd of 5
1912	Washington	Progressive	Robert T. Hodge		77,792	24.44 / 100	3rd of 6
1912	Washington	Socialist	Anna A. Maley		37,155	11.67 / 100	4th of 6
1912	West Virginia	Socialist	Walter B. Hilton		15,048	5.61 / 100	3rd of 4
1912	Wisconsin	Social-Democratic	Carl D. Thompson		34,468	8.75 / 100	3rd of 5
1913	Arkansas	Progressive	George W. Murphy		8,431	10.1 / 100	3rd of 4
1913	Arkansas	Socialist	J. Emil Webber		4,378	5.24 / 100	4th of 4
1913	Massachusetts	Progressive	Charles S. Bird		127,755	27.72 / 100	2nd of 7
1913	New Jersey	Progressive	Everett Colby		41,132	10.96 / 100	3rd of 7
1913	Virginia	Socialist	C. Campbell		3,789	5.23 / 100	2nd of 3
1914	Arizona	Progressive	George U. Young		5,206	10.21 / 100	3rd of 4
1914	Arkansas	Socialist	Dan Hogan		10,434	7.7 / 100	3rd of 3
1914	California	Progressive	Hiram Johnson		460,495	49.69 / 100	**Re-elected**
1914	California	Socialist	Noble A. Richardson		50,716	5.47 / 100	4th of 5
1914	Colorado	Progressive	Edward P. Costigan		32,920	12.41 / 100	3rd of 5
1914	Idaho	Progressive	Hugh E. McElroy		10,583	9.81 / 100	3rd of 4
1914	Idaho	Socialist	L. A. Coblentz		7,967	7.38 / 100	4th of 4
1914	Kansas	Progressive	Henry Justin Allen		84,060	15.91 / 100	3rd of 6
1914	Kansas	Independent	Julius B. Billiard		7,967	7.38 / 100	4th of 4
1914	Maine	Progressive	Halbert P. Gardner		18,226	12.87 / 100	3rd of 5
1914	Massachusetts	Progressive	Joseph Walker		32,145	7.02 / 100	3rd of 6
1914	Michigan	Progressive	Henry R. Pattengill		36,747	8.34 / 100	3rd of 6
1914	Minnesota	Prohibition	Willis G. Calderwood		18,582	5.41 / 100	3rd of 6
1914	Minnesota	Socialist	Thomas J. "Tom" Lewis		17,225	5.02 / 100	4th of 6
1914	Nevada	Socialist	W. A. Morgan		3,391	15.74 / 100	3rd of 3
1914	New York	American	William Sulzer		126,270	8.77 / 100	3rd of 6
1914	North Dakota	Socialist	J. A. Williams		6,019	6.74 / 100	3rd of 3
1914	Ohio	Progressive	James Rudolph Garfield		60,904	5.39 / 100	3rd of 4
1914	Oklahoma	Socialist	Fred W. Holt		52,704	20.78 / 100	3rd of 6
1914	Oregon	Socialist	W. J. Smith		14,284	5.76 / 100	3rd of 6
1914	South Dakota	Independent	Richard Olsen Richards		9,725	9.91 / 100	3rd of 5
1914	Texas	Socialist	E. R. Meitzen		24,977	11.59 / 100	2nd of 5
1914	Vermont	Progressive	Walter J. Aldrich		6,969	11.22 / 100	3rd of 5
1914	Wisconsin	Progressive (Note: On ballot as "Independent Progressive")	John J. Blaine		32,560	10.01 / 100	3rd of 6
1914	Wisconsin	Social-Democratic	Oscar Ameringer		25,917	7.96 / 100	4th of 6
1915	Mississippi	Socialist	J. T. Lester		4,046	7.41 / 100	2nd of 2
1916	Arkansas	Socialist	William Davis		9,730	5.54 / 100	3rd of 3
1916	Florida	Prohibition	Sidney Johnston Catts		39,546	47.71 / 100	**Elected**
1916	Idaho	Socialist	Annie E. Triplow		7,321	5.44 / 100	3rd of 3
1916	Louisiana	Progressive	John M. Parker		48,085	37.2 / 100	2nd of 3
1916	Minnesota	Socialist	J. O. Bentall		26,306	6.73 / 100	3rd of 5
1916	Minnesota	Prohibition	Thomas J. Anderson		19,884	5.09 / 100	4th of 5
1916	Montana	Socialist	Lewis J. Duncan		11,342	6.53 / 100	3rd of 3
1916	Washington	Socialist	Ludwig E. Katterfield		21,167	5.61 / 100	3rd of 6
1916	Wisconsin	Socialist	Rae Weaver		30,649	7.06 / 100	3rd of 4
1918	Alabama	Independent	Dallas B. Smith		13,497	19.79 / 100	2nd of 2
1918	Arkansas	Socialist	Clay Fulks		4,792	6.57 / 100	2nd of 2
1918	California	Independent	Theodore Arlington Bell		251,189	36.48 / 100	2nd of 3
1918	Minnesota	Farmer–Labor	David H. Evans		111,948	30.28 / 100	2nd of 5
1918	New York	Socialist	Joseph Cannon		159,804	7.36 / 100	3rd of 4
1918	South Dakota	Independent	Mark P. Bates		25,118	26.12 / 100	2nd of 5
1918	Wisconsin	Socialist	Emil Seidel		57,523	17.35 / 100	3rd of 4
1920	Arkansas	Independent (Note: On ballot as "Negro Independent")	J. H. Blount		15,627	8.22 / 100	3rd of 4
1920	Idaho	Independent	Sherman D. Fairchild		28,752	20.11 / 100	3rd of 3
1920	Minnesota	Independent (Note: Affiliated with the Farmer–Labor Party)	Henrik Shipstead		281,402	35.91 / 100	2nd of 4
1920	Nebraska	Nonpartisan League	Arthur G. Wray		88,905	23.51 / 100	3rd of 4
1920	New York	Socialist	Joseph Cannon		159,804	5.57 / 100	3rd of 6
1920	South Dakota	Nonpartisan League	Mark P. Bates		48,426	26.34 / 100	2nd of 3
1920	Texas	American	T. H. McGregor		69,380	14.4 / 100	3rd of 5
1920	Texas	Black and Tan Republican	H. Capers		26,091	5.42 / 100	4th of 5
1920	Washington	Farmer–Labor	Robert Bridges		121,371	30.1 / 100	2nd of 4
1920	West Virginia	Nonpartisan League	Samuel B. Montgomery		81,330	15.89 / 100	3rd of 4
1920	Wisconsin	Socialist	William Coleman		71,126	10.29 / 100	3rd of 4
1922	Idaho	Progressive	H. F. Samuels		40,516	31.69 / 100	2nd of 3
1922	Minnesota	Farmer–Labor	Magnus Johnson		295,479	43.13 / 100	2nd of 3
1922	North Dakota	Nonpartisan League	William Lemke		81,048	42.35 / 100	2nd of 2
1922	South Dakota	Nonpartisan League	Alice Lorraine Daly		46,033	26.24 / 100	3rd of 3
1922	Wisconsin	Independent Democratic	Arthur A. Bentley		51,061	10.6 / 100	2nd of 5
1922	Wisconsin	Socialist	Louis A. Arnold		39,570	8.21 / 100	3rd of 5
1924	Idaho	Progressive	H. F. Samuels		58,163	39.04 / 100	2nd of 3
1924	Kansas	Independent	William Allen White		149,811	22.71 / 100	3rd of 4
1924	Minnesota	Farmer–Labor	Floyd B. Olson		366,029	43.84 / 100	2nd of 5
1924	Montana	Farmer–Labor	Frank J. Edwards		10,576	6.08 / 100	3rd of 3
1924	Nebraska	Progressive	Dan Butler		35,594	7.94 / 100	3rd of 3
1924	South Dakota	Farmer–Labor	A. L. Putnam		27,027	13.25 / 100	3rd of 4
1924	South Dakota	Independent	Richard Olsen Richards		20,359	9.98 / 100	4th of 4
1924	Washington	Progressive	J. R. "Bob" Oman		40,073	10.27 / 100	3rd of 6
1924	Wisconsin	Socialist	William F. Quick		45,268	5.68 / 100	3rd of 7
1926	Idaho	Progressive	W. Scott Hall		34,208	28.36 / 100	2nd of 3
1926	Minnesota	Farmer–Labor	Magnus Johnson		266,845	38.09 / 100	2nd of 3
1926	Oregon	Independent	H. H. Stallard		12,402	5.49 / 100	3rd of 3
1926	South Dakota	Farmer–Labor	Tom Ayres		11,958	6.51 / 100	3rd of 4
1926	South Dakota	Independent	John E. Hipple		10,637	5.79 / 100	4th of 4
1926	Wisconsin	Independent	Charles Perry		76,507	13.84 / 100	2nd of 6
1926	Wisconsin	Socialist	Herman O. Kent		40,293	7.29 / 100	4th of 6
1928	Minnesota	Farmer–Labor	Ernest Lundeen		227,193	22.72 / 100	2nd of 5
1930	Alabama	Independent	Hugh A. Locke		95,745	38.18 / 100	2nd of 2
1930	Kansas	Independent (Write-In)	John R. Brinkley		183,278	29.5 / 100	3rd of 4
1930	Minnesota	Farmer–Labor	Floyd B. Olson		473,154	59.34 / 100	**Elected**
1930	New York	Law Preservation (Note: State affiliate of the Prohibition Party)	Robert P. Carroll		190,666	6.08 / 100	3rd of 6
1930	Oregon	Independent	Julius Meier		135,608	54.51 / 100	**Elected**
1932	Kansas	Independent	John R. Brinkley		244,607	30.58 / 100	3rd of 4
1932	Minnesota	Farmer–Labor	Floyd B. Olson		522,438	50.57 / 100	**Re-elected**
1932	Tennessee	Independent	Lewis S. Pope		106,990	27.05 / 100	3rd of 5
1932	Washington	Liberty	Luvern Clyde Hicks		41,710	6.79 / 100	3rd of 7
1932	Wisconsin	Socialist	Frank Metcalfe		56,965	5.07 / 100	3rd of 6
1934	California	Progressive	Raymond L. Haight		302,519	12.99 / 100	3rd of 5
1934	Connecticut	Socialist	Jasper McLevy		38,438	6.96 / 100	3rd of 6
1934	Massachusetts	Equal Tax	Frank A. Goodwin		94,141	6.35 / 100	3rd of 7
1934	Minnesota	Farmer–Labor	Floyd B. Olson		468,812	44.61 / 100	**Re-elected**
1934	Nevada	Independent	Lindley C. Branson		4,940	11.54 / 100	3rd of 3
1934	Oregon	Independent	Peter Zimmerman		95,519	31.57 / 100	2nd of 6
1934	Tennessee	Fusion (Note: An electoral alliance between Lewis Pope and the Republican Party)	Lewis S. Pope		122,965	38.22 / 100	2nd of 2
1934	Wisconsin	Progressive	Philip La Follette		373,093	39.12 / 100	**Elected**
1936	Delaware	Independent Republican	Isaac Dolphus Short		8,400	6.62 / 100	3rd of 5
1936	Minnesota	Farmer–Labor	Elmer Austin Benson		680,342	60.74 / 100	**Elected**
1936	North Dakota	Nonpartisan League	William Langer		98,750	35.80 / 100	**Elected**
1936	Wisconsin	Progressive	Philip La Follette		573,724	46.38 / 100	**Re-elected**
1938	Connecticut	Socialist	Jasper McLevy		166,253	26.3 / 100	3rd of 5
1938	Minnesota	Farmer–Labor	Elmer Austin Benson		387,263	34.18 / 100	2nd of 4
1938	Nebraska	Independent	Charles W. Bryan		76,258	15.35 / 100	3rd of 3
1938	Wisconsin	Progressive	Philip La Follette		353,381	36.0 / 100	2nd of 5
1940	Minnesota	Farmer–Labor	Hjalmar Petersen		459,609	36.55 / 100	2nd of 4
1940	Wisconsin	Progressive	Orland Steen Loomis		546,436	39.78 / 100	2nd of 5
1942	Connecticut	Socialist	Jasper McLevy		34,537	6.01 / 100	3rd of 4
1942	Minnesota	Farmer–Labor	Hjalmar Petersen		299,917	37.76 / 100	2nd of 4
1942	New York	American Labor	Dean Alfange		403,626	9.79 / 100	3rd of 6
1942	Wisconsin	Progressive	Orland Steen Loomis		397,664	49.65 / 100	**Elected**
1944	North Dakota	Independent	Alvin C. Strutz		38,997	18.81 / 100	3rd of 4
1944	Wisconsin	Progressive	Alexander O. Benz		76,028	5.76 / 100	3rd of 5
1946	California	Prohibition	Henry R. Schmidt		180,579	7.06 / 100	2nd of 2
1950	Tennessee	Independent (Note: On the ballot as "Good Government, Good Elections")	John Randolph Neal Jr.		51,757	21.91 / 100	2nd of 2
1952	Maine	Independent Republican	Neil S. Bishop		35,732	14.38 / 100	3rd of 4
1952	Vermont	Republican (Write-In)	Henry D. Vail		12,447	8.25 / 100	3rd of 3
1954	Tennessee	Independent	John Randolph Neal Jr.		39,574	12.27 / 100	2nd of 3
1956	Nebraska	Independent	George Morris		31,592	5.56 / 100	3rd of 3
1956	Texas	Democratic (Write-In)	W. Lee O'Daniel		110,234	6.39 / 100	3rd of 3
1956	Utah	Independent	J. Bracken Lee		94,428	28.37 / 100	3rd of 3
1958	Oklahoma	Independent	D. A. "Jelly" Bryce		31,840	5.91 / 100	3rd of 3
1958	Tennessee	Independent	Jim Nance McCord		136,406	31.54 / 100	2nd of 9
1960	North Dakota	Independent	Herschel Lashkowitz		16,741	6.08 / 100	3rd of 3
1962	Tennessee	Independent	William Anderson		203,765	32.83 / 100	2nd of 4
1965	Virginia	Virginia Conservative	William J. Story Jr.		75,307	13.38 / 100	3rd of 4
1966	Alabama	Independent	Carl Robinson		47,653	5.62 / 100	3rd of 3
1966	Georgia	Democratic (Write-In)	Ellis Arnall		51,947	5.43 / 100	3rd of 3
1966	Idaho	Independent	Perry Swisher		30,913	12.24 / 100	3rd of 4
1966	Idaho	Independent	Philip Jungert		23,139	9.16 / 100	4th of 4
1966	Maryland	Independent	Hyman A. Pressman		90,899	9.88 / 100	3rd of 3
1966	New York	Conservative	Paul Adams		510,023	8.46 / 100	3rd of 6
1966	New York	Liberal	Franklin Delano Roosevelt Jr.		507,234	8.41 / 100	4th of 6
1966	Tennessee	Independent	H. L. Crowder		64,602	9.84 / 100	2nd of 4
1966	Tennessee	Independent	Charlie Moffett		50,221	7.65 / 100	3rd of 4
1970	Alabama	National Democratic	John L. Cashin Jr.		125,491	14.68 / 100	2nd of 6
1970	Alabama	Independent	A. C. Shelton		75,679	8.85 / 100	3rd of 6
1970	Arkansas	American	Walter L. Carruth		36,132	5.93 / 100	3rd of 3
1970	New Hampshire	American	Meldrim Thomson Jr.		22,033	9.91 / 100	3rd of 3
1970	New York	Conservative	Paul Adams		422,514	7.03 / 100	3rd of 6
1971	Mississippi	Independent	Charles Evers		172,762	22.13 / 100	2nd of 2
1972	New Hampshire	Independent	Malcolm McLane		63,199	19.56 / 100	3rd of 3
1972	Texas	Raza Unida	Ramsey Muñiz		214,118	6.28 / 100	3rd of 4
1972	Washington	Taxpayers	Vick Gould		86,843	5.9 / 100	3rd of 5
1973	Virginia	Independent	Henry Howell		510,103	49.28 / 100	2nd of 2
1974	Maine	Independent	James B. Longley		142,464	39.14 / 100	**Elected**
1974	Nebraska	Independent	Ernie Chambers		24,320	5.39 / 100	3rd of 3
1974	Nevada	Independent American	James Ray Houston		26,285	15.52 / 100	3rd of 3
1974	Texas	Raza Unida	Ramsey Muñiz		93,295	5.64 / 100	3rd of 5
1976	Vermont	Liberty Union	Bernie Sanders		11,317	6.09 / 100	3rd of 3
1978	Alaska	Republican (Write-In)	Wally Hickel		33,555	26.44 / 100	2nd of 5
1978	Alaska	Independent	Tom Kelly		15,656	12.34 / 100	4th of 5
1978	California	Independent (Note: Affiliated with the Libertarian Party)	Ed Clark		377,960	5.46 / 100	3rd of 5
1978	Maine	Independent	Herman C. Frankland		65,889	17.8 / 100	3rd of 3
1978	Rhode Island	Independent	Joseph A. Doorley		20,381	6.48 / 100	3rd of 3
1982	Alaska	Libertarian	Dick Randolph		29,067	14.92 / 100	3rd of 4
1982	Arizona	Libertarian	Sam Steiger		36,649	5.05 / 100	3rd of 3
1982	Hawaii	Independent (Note: On ballot as an Independent Democrat)	Frank Fasi		89,303	28.64 / 100	2nd of 3
1986	Alaska	Alaskan Independence	Joe Vogler		10,013	5.58 / 100	3rd of 5
1986	Arizona	Independent	Bill Schulz		224,085	25.85 / 100	3rd of 3
1986	Illinois	Solidarity	Adlai Stevenson III	Mike Howlett	1,256,626	39.97 / 100	2nd of 5
1986	Maine	Independent	Sherry Huber		64,317	15.07 / 100	3rd of 4
1986	Maine	Independent	John Menario		63,747	14.87 / 100	4th of 4
1986	Oklahoma	Independent	Jerry Brown		60,115	6.61 / 100	3rd of 4
1986	Vermont	Independent	Bernie Sanders		28,418	14.45 / 100	3rd of 4
1988	Utah	Independent	Merrill Cook		136,651	21.05 / 100	3rd of 5
1990	Alaska	Alaskan Independence	Wally Hickel	Jack Coghill	75,721	38.88 / 100	**Elected**
1990	Connecticut	A Connecticut Party	Lowell Weicker	Eunice Groark	460,576	40.36 / 100	**Elected**
1990	Kansas	Independent	Christina Campbell-Cline	Benton	69,127	8.82 / 100	3rd of 3
1990	Maine	Independent	Andrew Adam		48,377	9.26 / 100	3rd of 3
1990	New York	Conservative	Herbert London	Anthony Diperna	827,614	20.4 / 100	3rd of 7
1990	Oklahoma	Independent (Note: Was on ballot as "Reform")	Thomas D. Ledgerwood II		90,534	9.93 / 100	3rd of 3
1990	Oregon	Independent	Al Mobley		144,062	12.95 / 100	3rd of 4
1992	Utah	Independent	Merrill Cook	Frances Hatch Merrill	255,753	33.54 / 100	2nd of 8
1992	West Virginia	Independent (Write-In)	Charlotte Pritt		48,873	7.43 / 100	3rd of 3
1994	Alaska	Alaskan Independence	Jack Coghill	Margaret Ward	27,838	13.04 / 100	3rd of 5
1994	Connecticut	A Connecticut Party	Eunice Groark	Audrey Rowe	216,585	18.88 / 100	3rd of 5
1994	Connecticut	Independent	Tom Scott	Glen R. O'Keefe	130,128	11.34 / 100	4th of 5
1994	Hawaii	Best Party of Hawaii	Frank Fasi	Danny Kaleikini	113,158	30.67 / 100	2nd of 4
1994	Maine	Independent	Angus King		180,829	35.37 / 100	**Elected**
1994	Maine	Green	Jonathan Carter		32,695	6.39 / 100	4th of 5
1994	New Mexico	Green	Roberto Mondragón	Steven Schmidt	47,990	10.26 / 100	3rd of 3
1994	Oklahoma	Independent	Wes Watkins		233,336	23.45 / 100	3rd of 3
1994	Pennsylvania	Constitution	Peg Luksik	Jim Clymer	460,269	12.84 / 100	3rd of 5
1994	Rhode Island	Independent	Robert J. Healey		32,822	9.08 / 100	3rd of 3
1994	Vermont	Independent	Thomas J. Morse		15,000	7.07 / 100	3rd of 8
1998	Alaska	Republican (Write-In)	Robin L. Taylor		40,209	18.26 / 100	2nd of 6
1998	Alaska	Republican Moderate	Ray Metcalfe	Clyde Baxley	13,540	6.15 / 100	4th of 6
1998	Maine	Independent	Angus King		246,772	58.61 / 100	**Re-elected**
1998	Maine	Green	Pat LaMarche		28,722	6.82 / 100	4th of 5
1998	Minnesota	Reform	Jesse Ventura	Mae Schunk	773,713	36.99 / 100	**Elected**
1998	New York	Independence	Tom Golisano	Laureen Oliver	364,056	7.69 / 100	3rd of 10
1998	Pennsylvania	Constitution	Peg Luksik	Jim Clymer	315,761	10.44 / 100	3rd of 10
1998	Rhode Island	Cool Moose	Robert J. Healey		19,250	6.28 / 100	3rd of 4
1999	Kentucky	Reform	Gatewood Galbraith	Kathy Lyons	88,930	15.33 / 100	3rd of 5
2000	New Hampshire	Independent	Mary Brown		35,904	6.36 / 100	3rd of 4
2000	Vermont	Vermont Progressive	Anthony Pollina		28,116	9.58 / 100	3rd of 8
2002	Arizona	Independent	Richard D. Mahoney		84,947	6.93 / 100	3rd of 4
2002	California	Green	Peter Camejo		393,036	5.26 / 100	3rd of 6
2002	Maine	Green	Jonathan Carter		46,903	9.28 / 100	3rd of 4
2002	Minnesota	Independence	Tim Penny	Martha Robertson	364,534	16.18 / 100	3rd of 7
2002	New Mexico	Green	David Bacon	Kathleen Sanchez	26,465	5.47 / 100	3rd of 4
2002	New York	Independence	Tom Golisano	Mary Donohue	654,016	14.28 / 100	3rd of 8
2002	Oklahoma	Independent	Gary Richardson		146,200	14.12 / 100	3rd of 3
2002	Vermont	Independent	Cornelius Hogan		22,353	9.71 / 100	3rd of 10
2002	Wisconsin	Libertarian	Ed Thompson	Martin Reynolds	185,455	10.45 / 100	3rd of 8
2006	Alaska	Independent	Andrew Halcro	Fay Von Gemmingen	22,443	9.46 / 100	3rd of 6
2006	Illinois	Green	Rich Whitney	Julie Samuels	361,336	10.36 / 100	3rd of 3
2006	Maine	Independent	Barbara Merrill		118,720	21.55 / 100	3rd of 5
2006	Maine	Green	Pat LaMarche		52,690	9.56 / 100	4th of 5
2006	Massachusetts	Independent	Christy Mihos	John J. Sullivan	154,628	6.97 / 100	3rd of 4
2006	Minnesota	Independence	Peter Hutchinson	Maureen Reed	141,735	6.43 / 100	3rd of 6
2006	Texas	Independent	Carole Keeton Strayhorn		797,577	18.13 / 100	3rd of 5
2006	Texas	Independent	Kinky Friedman		546,869	12.43 / 100	4th of 5
2007	Louisiana	Independent	John Georges		186,682	14.38 / 100	3rd of 12
2008	Vermont	Independent	Anthony Pollina		69,791	21.87 / 100	2nd of 7
2009	New Jersey	Independent	Chris Daggett	Frank J. Esposito	139,579	5.75 / 100	3rd of 12
2010	Colorado	Constitution	Tom Tancredo	Pat Miller	652,376	36.38 / 100	2nd of 6
2010	Idaho	Independent	Jana M. Kemp		26,655	5.89 / 100	3rd of 5
2010	Maine	Independent	Eliot Cutler		208,270	36.36 / 100	2nd of 6
2010	Maine	Independent	Shawn Moody		28,756	5.02 / 100	4th of 6
2010	Massachusetts	Independent	Tim Cahill	Paul Loscocco	184,387	8.03 / 100	3rd of 4
2010	Minnesota	Independence	Tom Horner	James A. Mulder	251,487	11.94 / 100	3rd of 7
2010	Rhode Island	Independent	Lincoln Chafee		123,571	36.1 / 100	**Elected**
2010	Rhode Island	Moderate	Ken Block		22,146	6.47 / 100	4th of 7
2010	Wyoming	Independent	Taylor Haynes		13,796	7.32 / 100	3rd of 4
2011	Kentucky	Independent	Gatewood Galbraith	Dea Taylor	74,860	8.99 / 100	3rd of 3
2013	Virginia	Libertarian	Robert Sarvis		146,084	6.52 / 100	3rd of 3
2014	Alaska	Independent	Bill Walker	Byron Mallott	134,658	48.1 / 100	**Elected**
2014	Hawaii	Independent	Mufi Hannemann	Les Chang	42,934	11.72 / 100	3rd of 4
2014	Maine	Independent	Eliot Cutler		51,518	8.43 / 100	3rd of 3
2014	Rhode Island	Moderate	Robert J. Healey		69,278	21.38 / 100	3rd of 5
2014	Wyoming	Independent	Don Wills		9,895	5.89 / 100	3rd of 4
2016	West Virginia	Mountain	Charlotte Pritt		41,310	5.9 / 100	3rd of 4
2018	Kansas	Independent	Greg Orman	John Doll	66,163	6.5 / 100	3rd of 6
2018	Maine	Independent	Terry Hayes		37,128	5.9 / 100	3rd of 3
2020	Indiana	Libertarian	Donald Rainwater	William Henry	345,569	11.4 / 100	3rd of 3
2020	Vermont	Vermont Progressive	David Zuckerman (Note: Also nominated as the Democratic candidate.)		99,214	27.4 / 100	2nd of 8
2022	Alaska	Independent	Bill Walker	Heidi Drygas	54,585	20.7 / 100	3rd of 4
2022	Idaho	Independent	Ammon Bundy		101,837	17.2 / 100	3rd of 5
2022	Oregon	Independent	Betsy Johnson		164,755	8.6 / 100	3rd of 5
2024	North Dakota	Independent	Michael Coachman		20,327	5.6 / 100	3rd of 3
2024	Utah	Independent Republican (Write-in)	Phil Lyman		200,551	13.57 / 100	3rd of 7
2026	Arkansas	Libertarian	Colt Shelby		66,913	7.55 / 100	3rd of 3
2026	Idaho	Independent	John Stegner		54,867	7.66 / 100	3rd of 5
2026	Maine	Independent	Rick Bennett		57,707	8.08 / 100	3rd of 3
2026	Rhode Island	Independent	Ken Block		99,829	27.75 / 100	2nd of 5
2026	Tennessee	Independent	David Hatley		195,288	9.30 / 100	3rd of 15
2026	Wyoming	Constitution	Rebecca Bextel		31,444	16.67 / 100	2nd of 3
