= 1836 United States presidential election in Georgia =

- November 7, 1836
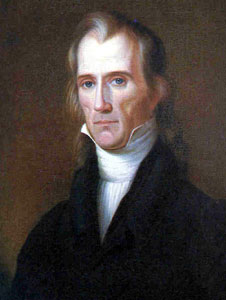

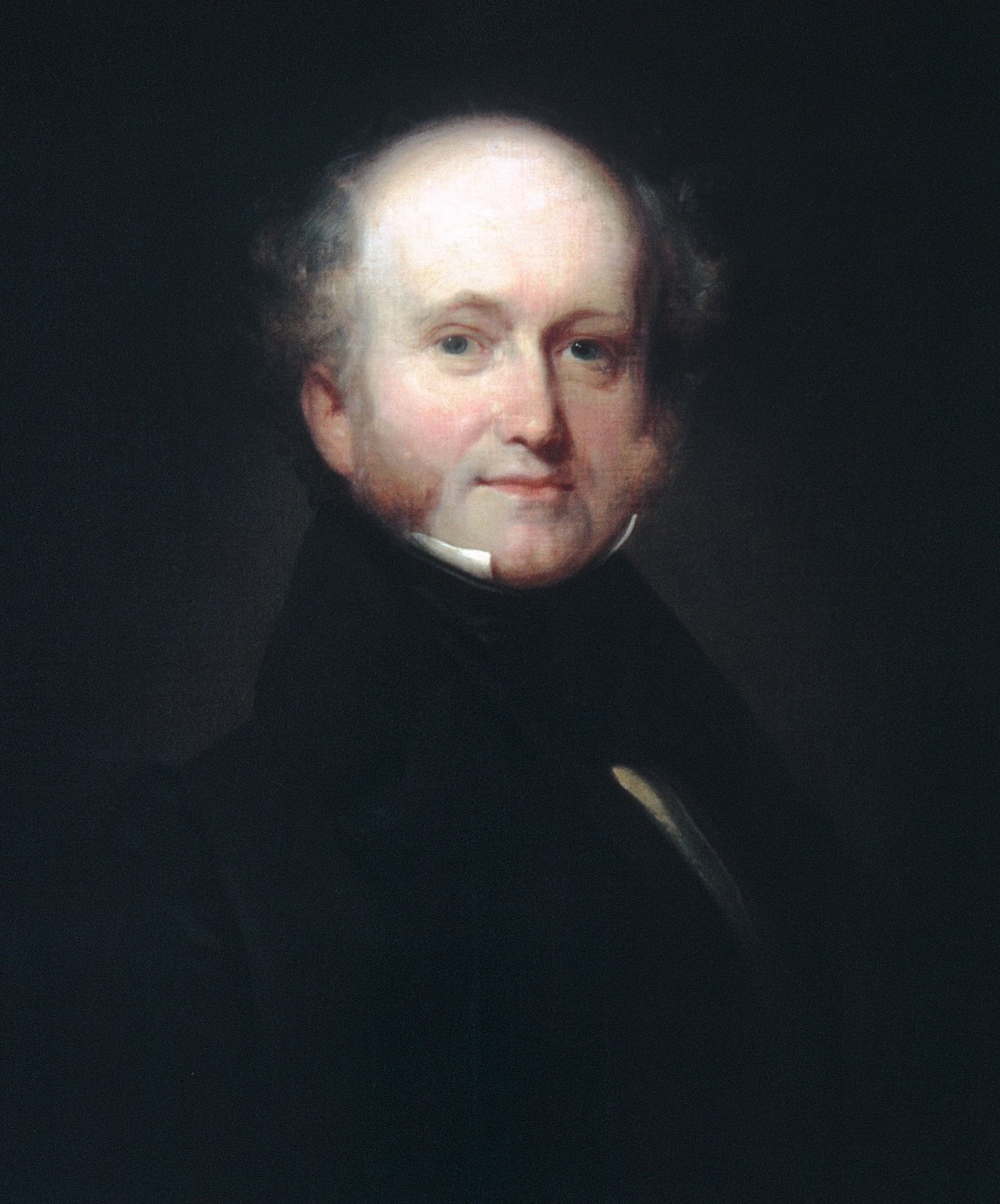
Nominee	Hugh Lawson White	Martin Van Buren
Party	Whig	Democratic
Alliance	State Rights	Union Party
Home state	Tennessee	New York
Running mate	John Tyler	Richard Mentor Johnson
Electoral vote	11	0
Popular vote	24,481	22,778
Percentage	51.80%	48.20%
County results
White
50–60%
60–70%
70–80%
80–90%
90–100%
Van Buren
50–60%
60–70%
70–80%
80–90%
90–100%
Unknown/No vote

A presidential election was held in Georgia on November 7, 1836 as part of the 1836 United States presidential election. Voters chose 11 representatives, or electors to the Electoral College, who voted for president and vice president.

Thanks to divisions within the Union party, Georgia voted for State Rights party backed Whig candidate Hugh Lawson White over the Union party backed Democratic candidate, Martin Van Buren. White won Georgia by a margin of 3.6%.

White also won Tennessee, giving him 26 electoral votes, the third highest total behind Van Buren's 170, and Harrison's 73.

This was the only election in which a Democrat won the presidency without carrying Georgia until 1964, nearly 130 years later. Alongside Lyndon B. Johnson in that year, only Bill Clinton in 1996 (though he carried the state four years prior) and Barack Obama in 2008 and 2012 have been elected without carrying it.

== Background ==
During this time, Georgian politics were dominated by two local parties, the Union party and the State Rights party. The Union party was the product of the forces of liberal democracy that brought white manhood suffrage and popular elections in the 1800s. The State Rights party, on the other hand, was a political anomaly whose conservative politics and organization were more closely related to those of the late 1800s.

Inspired by the State Rights party's state convention in June 1835 at Milledgeville that chose Charles Dougherty for the 1835 Georgia gubernatorial election, the Union party decided to hold a state convention instead of party leaders choosing the nominee.

Both Van Buren and his running mate Richard Johnson were unpopular among the Union party and the convention spent two days in debate. Despite this, the party organ merely reported that the party was united in firm support of the nominees of the national party. The State Rights party convention in 1835 endorsed the candidacy of Hugh White.

The decision to nominate Van Buren angered many of the Clark party (predecessor party of the Union party) veterans in the Union party. One reason the Clark party had backed Andrew Jackson in 1824 was that they detested one of his rivals for the nomination, William H. Crawford, long time political enemy of their chieftain, John Clark. Van Buren was Crawford's campaign manager in 1824, and many former Clark Union men never trusted him again.

The Union party was further torn over the issue of the Union Party-controlled Central Bank of Georgia. In 1836 Congress enacted a Henry Clay-backed law that would distribute "surplus revenues" among the states, immediately raising the question of what was to be done with the money. Central Bank president Tomlinson Fort had chosen to deposit the revenue in the Central Bank, which would then loan it out "democratically." Some Union party newspapers feared this decision would increase the power of such a dangerous institution while other Union party newspapers supported the idea.

In an effort to sow discord within the Union party, the State Rights Party put forth Joseph Jackson as a candidate for congress. Jackson had openly disagreed with his brother, Jabez Young Jackson, an incumbent congressman from the Union party seeking re-election, regarding their father James Jackson's stance on Nullification. Additionally, the State Rights Party nominated Thomas Glascock, a congressman from the Union party, who had voted against, rather than simply postponing, Abolitionist petitions in Congress. The State Rights Party viewed Glascock as a defender of the South against Abolitionists and not beholden to Van Buren, unlike other Georgia congressmen. John Cuthbert, editor of the Union party newspaper Federal Union, acknowledged that Union party congressmen had differing views on Abolitionist petitions but argued that, unlike Nullifiers, Georgia's representatives aimed to preserve rather than disrupt the Union.

Pleas for unity within the Union Party editors rang hollow when two of their Van Buren electors, James Watson and former Governor Wilson Lumpkin, resigned from the ticket. Naturally, the State Rights Party wasted no time in asserting that Watson and Lumpkin abandoned ship due to their reluctance to support Van Buren. However, the Columbus Sentinel rushed to Watson's defense, affirming his intention to vote for Van Buren on election day. Lumpkin clarified that he couldn't simultaneously fulfill his role as a commissioner for settling claims under the Cherokee treaty and serve as a presidential elector. He argued that his responsibilities as a Cherokee Commissioner took precedence in Georgia and stated his intention to back Van Buren at the polls during the election.

== Results ==
1836 United States presidential election in Georgia
Party	Candidate	Votes	Percentage	Electoral votes
Whig	Hugh Lawson White	24,481	51.80%	11
Democratic	Martin Van Buren	22,778	48.20%	0
Totals		47,259	100.00%	11

== See also ==
- United States presidential elections in Georgia
