= 1845 New Hampshire gubernatorial election =

- March 11, 1845
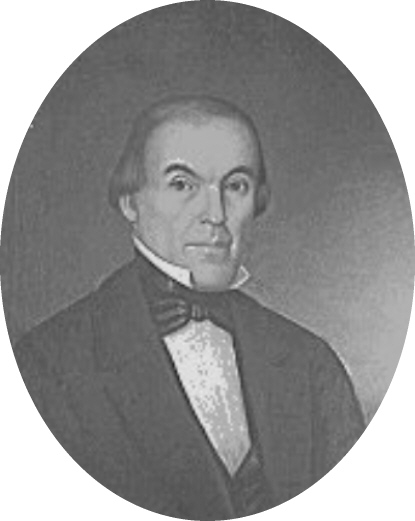

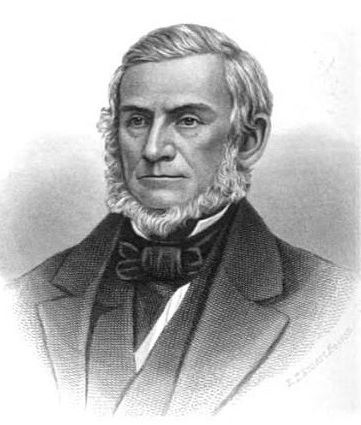

Nominee	John Hardy Steele	Anthony Colby	Daniel Hoit
Party	Democratic	Whig	Liberty
Popular vote	23,406	15,585	5,786
Percentage	51.14%	34.05%	12.64%
- County results Steele: 40–50% 50–60% 60–70% 70–80% Colby: 40–50%
Governor before election
John Hardy Steele
Democratic
Elected Governor
John Hardy Steele
Democratic

The 1845 New Hampshire gubernatorial election was held on March 11, 1845, in order to elect the governor of New Hampshire. Incumbent Democratic governor John Hardy Steele won re-election against Whig nominee and former member of the New Hampshire House of Representatives Anthony Colby and Liberty nominee Daniel Hoit in a rematch of the previous election.

== General election ==
On election day, March 11, 1845, incumbent Democratic governor John Hardy Steele won re-election by a margin of 7,821 votes against his foremost opponent Whig nominee Anthony Colby, thereby retaining Democratic control over the office of governor. Steele was sworn in for his second term on June 4, 1845.

=== Results ===
New Hampshire gubernatorial election, 1845
Party	Candidate	Votes	%
Democratic	John Hardy Steele (incumbent)	23,406	51.14
Whig	Anthony Colby	15,585	34.05
Liberty	Daniel Hoit	5,786	12.64
	Scattering	988	2.17
Total votes		45,765	100.00
Democratic hold			
