= 1837 Georgia gubernatorial election =

- October 2, 1837
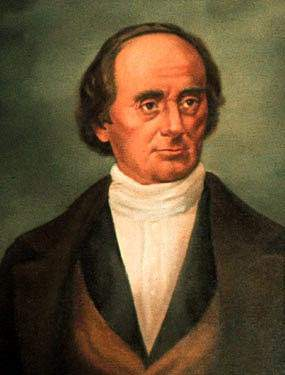

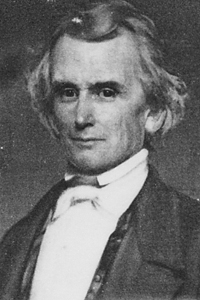
Nominee	George R. Gilmer	William Schley
Party	Whig	Democratic
Alliance	State Rights	Union Party
Popular vote	34,181	33,364
Percentage	50.60%	49.40%
- Results by County; Gilmer: 50–60% 60–70% 70–80% 80–90% >90% Schley: 50–60% 60–70% 70–80% 80–90% >90%
Governor before election
William Schley
Democratic
Elected Governor
George R. Gilmer
Whig

The 1837 Georgia gubernatorial election was held on October 2, 1837, to elect the governor of Georgia. In a major upset, thanks in part to the Panic of 1837, Whig State Rights candidate and Ex-Governor George R. Gilmer beat incumbent Democratic Union Governor Willam Schley.

== Background ==
During this time, Georgian politics were dominated by two local parties, the Union party and the State Rights party. The Union party was the product of the forces of liberal democracy that brought white manhood suffrage and popular elections in the 1800s. The State Rights party, on the other hand, was a political anomaly whose conservative politics and organization were more closely related to those of the late 1800s.

=== Panic of 1837 ===
The Panic of 1837 was a major hit to the already weakening Union party as it brought attention to the Union administered Central Bank of Georgia. Created in 1828, the state-owned bank was the most powerful financial institution in Georgia. Upcountry Democrats were supporters of the bank while the Whigs were skeptical of it.

The panic also highlighted disagreements between the liberal democratic wing of the Union party and the conservative machine element close to Governor Schley. The latter of these two groups was led by Tomlinson Fort, owner of the Democratic newspaper The Federal Union and president of the Central Bank since 1831. As head of both of these positions, it effectively made him the political and financial "dictator" of the Union administration. Dissatisfaction with Fort and his conservative machine caused many Union leaders to desert the governor and support the opposition.

The State Rights party nominated former Governor George R. Gilmer.

== Election ==
1837 Georgia gubernatorial election
Party	Candidate	Votes	%	±%
Whig	George R. Gilmer	34,181	50.60	+2.82
Democratic	William Schley	33,364	49.40	−2.82
Total votes		67,545	100.00	
