= Governor Steele =

Governor Steele may refer to:

- George Washington Steele (1839–1922), 1st Governor of Oklahoma Territory
- John Hardy Steele (1789–1865), 19th Governor of New Hampshire
- Robert Williamson Steele (1820–1901), Governor of the Territory of Jefferson
