= 1858 North Carolina gubernatorial election =

- August 5, 1858
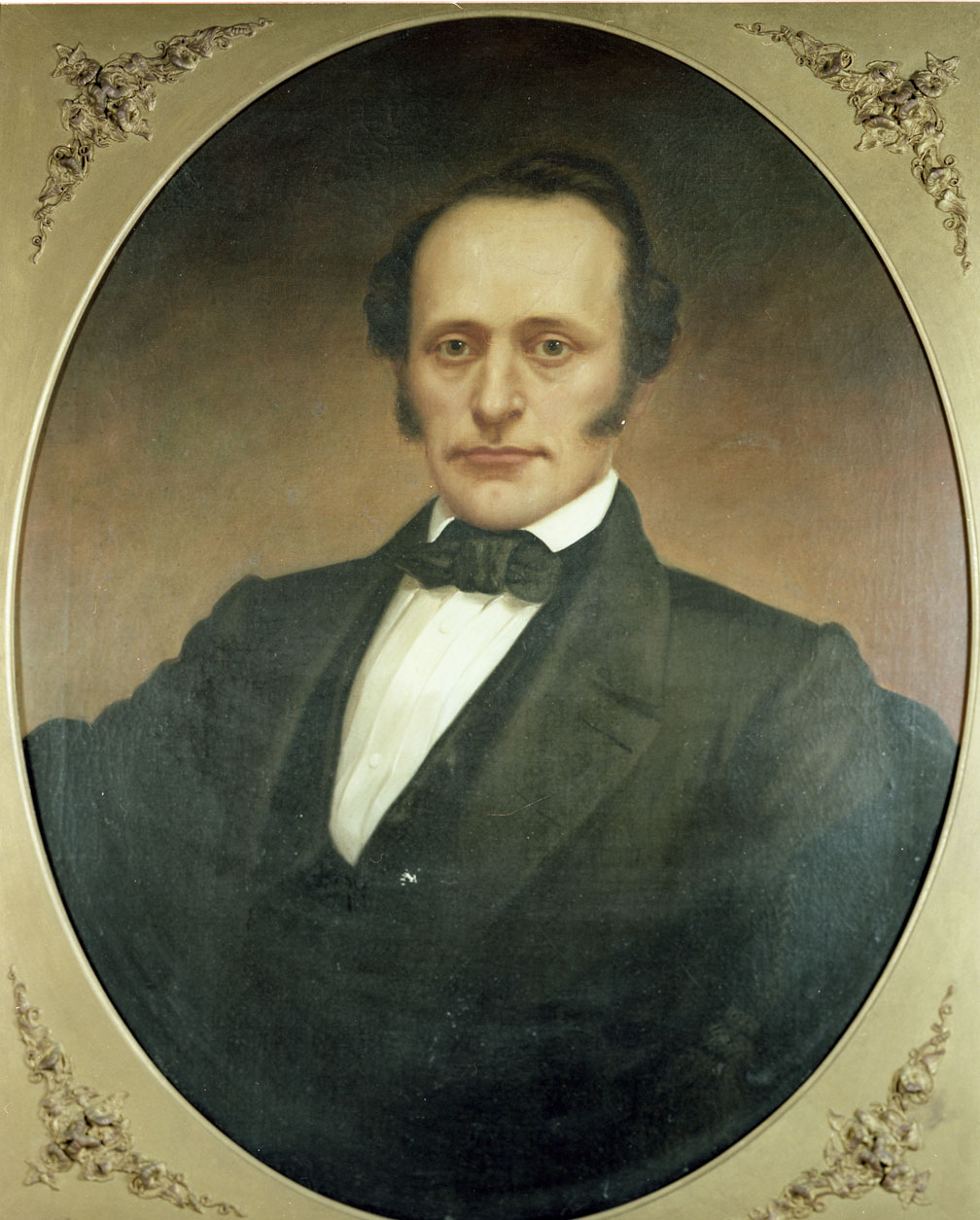

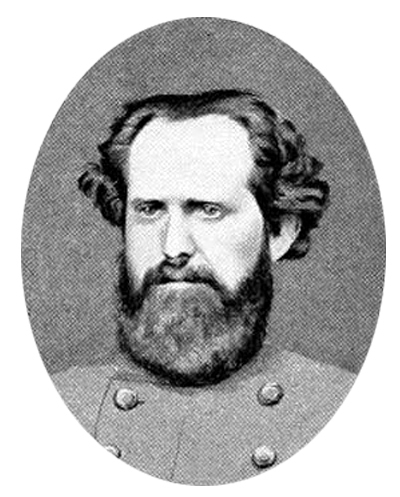
Nominee	John Willis Ellis	Duncan K. McRae
Party	Democratic	Independent Democrat
Popular vote	56,429	40,036
Percentage	58.50%	41.50%
- County results Ellis: 50–60% 60–70% 70–80% 80–90% >90% McRae: 50–60% 60–70% 70–80% 80–90%
Governor before election
Thomas Bragg
Democratic
Elected Governor
John Willis Ellis
Democratic

The 1858 North Carolina gubernatorial election was held on August 5, 1858, in order to elect the Governor of North Carolina. Democratic nominee and incumbent state superior court judge John Willis Ellis defeated Independent Democrat nominee and former United States Consul to Paris Duncan K. McRae.

== General election ==
On election day, August 5, 1858, Democratic nominee John Willis Ellis won the election by a margin of 16,393 votes against his opponent Independent Democrat nominee Duncan K. McRae, thereby retaining Democratic control over the office of Governor. Ellis was sworn in as the 35th Governor of North Carolina on January 1, 1859.

=== Results ===
North Carolina gubernatorial election, 1858
Party	Candidate	Votes	%
Democratic	John Willis Ellis	56,429	58.50
Independent Democrat	Duncan K. McRae	40,036	41.50
Total votes		96,465	100.00
Democratic hold			

== See also ==
- List of third party performances in United States gubernatorial elections
