= 1844 New Hampshire gubernatorial election =

- March 12, 1844
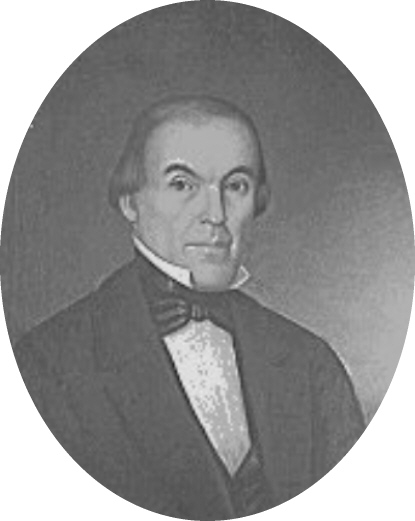

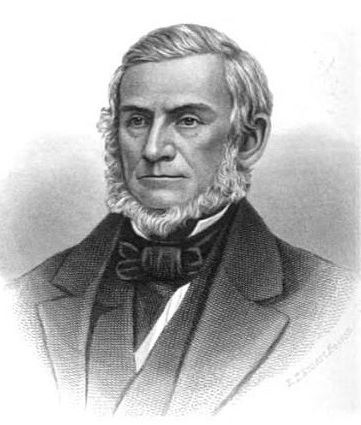

Nominee	John Hardy Steele	Anthony Colby	Daniel Hoit
Party	Democratic	Whig	Liberty
Popular vote	25,986	14,750	5,767
Percentage	53.37%	30.29%	11.84%
- County results Steele: 40–50% 50–60% 60–70% 70–80% Colby: 40–50%
Governor before election
Henry Hubbard
Democratic
Elected Governor
John Hardy Steele
Democratic

The 1844 New Hampshire gubernatorial election was held on March 12, 1844, in order to elect the Governor of New Hampshire. Democratic nominee and former member of the New Hampshire House of Representatives John Hardy Steele defeated Whig nominee and former member of the New Hampshire House of Representatives Anthony Colby, Conservative nominee John H. White and Liberty nominee Daniel Hoit.

== General election ==
On election day, March 12, 1844, Democratic nominee John Hardy Steele won the election by a margin of 11,236 votes against his foremost opponent Whig nominee Anthony Colby, thereby retaining Democratic control over the office of Governor. Steele was sworn in as the 19th Governor of New Hampshire on June 6, 1844.

=== Results ===
New Hampshire gubernatorial election, 1844
Party	Candidate	Votes	%
Democratic	John Hardy Steele	25,986	53.37
Whig	Anthony Colby	14,750	30.29
Liberty	Daniel Hoit	5,767	11.84
Conservative	John H. White	1,988	4.08
	Scattering	201	0.42
Total votes		48,692	100.00
Democratic hold			
