= 1835 Georgia gubernatorial election =

- October 5, 1835
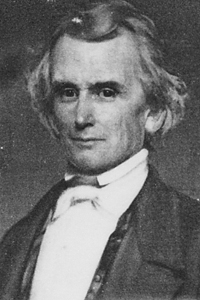
Nominee	William Schley	Charles Dougherty
Party	Democratic	Whig
Alliance	Union Party	State Rights
Popular vote	31,197	28,547
Percentage	52.22%	47.78%
- Results by County; Schley: 50–60% 60–70% 70–80% 80–90% >90% Dougherty: 50–60% 60–70% 70–80% 80–90% >90%
Governor before election
Wilson Lumpkin
Democratic
Elected Governor
William Schley
Democratic

The 1835 Georgia gubernatorial election was held on October 5, 1835, to elect the governor of Georgia. Democratic Union Governor Wilson Lumpkin, first elected in the 1831 election, did not seek re-election to a second term, instead he became U.S. commissioner to the Cherokee Native Americans. Democratic Union candidate William Schley, U.S House rep for Georgia's 1st congressional district, narrowly defeated Whig State Rights candidate Charles Dougherty.

== Background ==
During this time, Georgian politics were dominated by two local parties, the Union party and the State Rights party. The Union party was the product of the forces of liberal democracy that brought white manhood suffrage and popular elections in the 1800s. The State Rights party, on the other hand, was a political anomaly whose conservative politics and organization were more closely related to those of the late 1800s.

The State Rights caucus held a state convention in June at Milledgeville and nominated Charles Dougherty for governor. The Union party was much slower at adopting a state convention and had a central committee nominate U.S House Representative William Schley.

== Election ==
1835 Georgia gubernatorial election
Party	Candidate	Votes	%	±%
Democratic	William Schley	31,197	52.22	+0.46
Whig	Charles Dougherty	28,547	47.78	−0.46
Total votes		59,744	100	
