= 1839 Georgia gubernatorial election =

- October 7, 1839
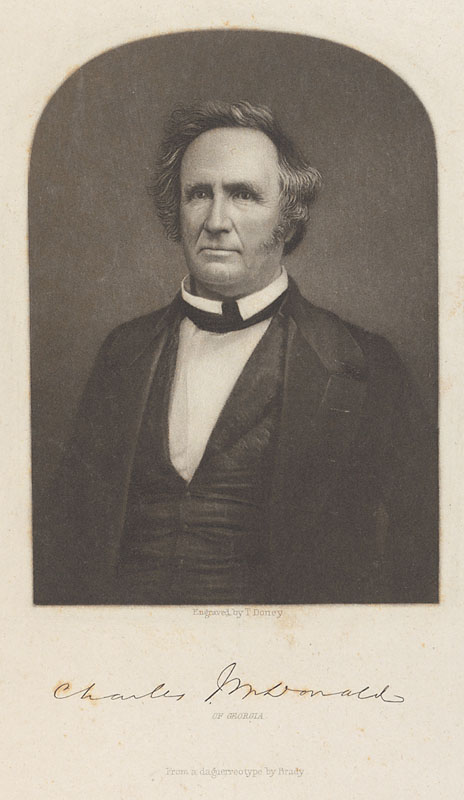

Nominee	Charles McDonald	Charles Dougherty
Party	Democratic	Whig
Alliance	Union Party	State Rights
Popular vote	34,634	32,727
Percentage	51.42%	48.58%
- Results by County; McDonald: 50–60% 60–70% 70–80% 80–90% >90% Dougherty: 50–60% 60–70% 70–80% 80–90% >90%

The 1839 Georgia gubernatorial election was held on October 7, 1839, to elect the governor of Georgia. The Democratic Union candidate Charles McDonald won the election defeating Whig State Rights Candidate Charles Dougherty, with the election being decided by 1,907 votes.

== Background ==
During this time, Georgian politics were dominated by two local parties, the Union party and the State Rights party. The Union party was the product of the forces of liberal democracy that brought white manhood suffrage and popular elections in the 1800s. The State Rights party, on the other hand, was a political anomaly whose conservative politics and organization were more closely related to those of the late 1800s.

Since the 1836 presidential election the Union and State Rights parties have slowly merged with the Democratic and Whig parties respectively.

== General election ==
=== Candidates ===
==== Democratic ====
- Charles McDonald, Former Brigadier general.

==== Whig ====
- Charles Dougherty, Lawyer

=== Results ===
1839 Georgia gubernatorial election
Party	Candidate	Votes	%	±%
Democratic	Charles McDonald	34,634	51.4	+2
Whig	Charles Dougherty	32,807	48.6	−2
Total votes		67,441	100	
