= Henry G. Lamar =

American judge (1798–1861)

Member of the U.S. House of Representatives from Georgia's at-large district
- In office December 7, 1829 – March 3, 1833
- Preceded by: Tomlinson Fort
- Succeeded by: William Schley

Personal details
- Born: Henry Graybill Lamar; July 10, 1798 Clinton, Georgia, U.S.
- Died: September 10, 1861 (aged 63) Macon, Georgia, U.S.
- Resting place: Rose Hill Cemetery, Macon, Georgia, U.S.
- Party: Jacksonian
- Profession: Politician, lawyer, judge

Henry Graybill Lamar (July 10, 1798 – September 10, 1861) was a United States representative, lawyer and jurist from Georgia.

Lamar was born in Clinton, Georgia, in 1798. He studied law, gained admittance to the state bar and practiced law in Macon, Georgia. He served as a state superior court judge before being elected to the Georgia House of Representatives.

In 1828, Lamar was elected as a Jacksonian Representative from Georgia to the 21st United States Congress to fill the remainder of the term for the vacant seat resulting from the resignation of George Rockingham Gilmer. Lamar was reelected to the 22nd Congress and served in total from December 7, 1829, to March 3, 1833. He lost his reelection campaign for the 23rd Congress in 1832. Lamar also ran an unsuccessful Georgia gubernatorial campaign in 1857 and served as an associate justice of the Supreme Court of Georgia. He died in Macon on September 10, 1861, and was buried in Rose Hill Cemetery in that same city.

U.S. House of Representatives
Preceded by Tomlinson Fort	Member of the U.S. House of Representatives from Georgia's at-large congressional district 1829–1833	Succeeded by William Schley
