= Jackson Street Cemetery =

- U.S. National Register of Historic Places
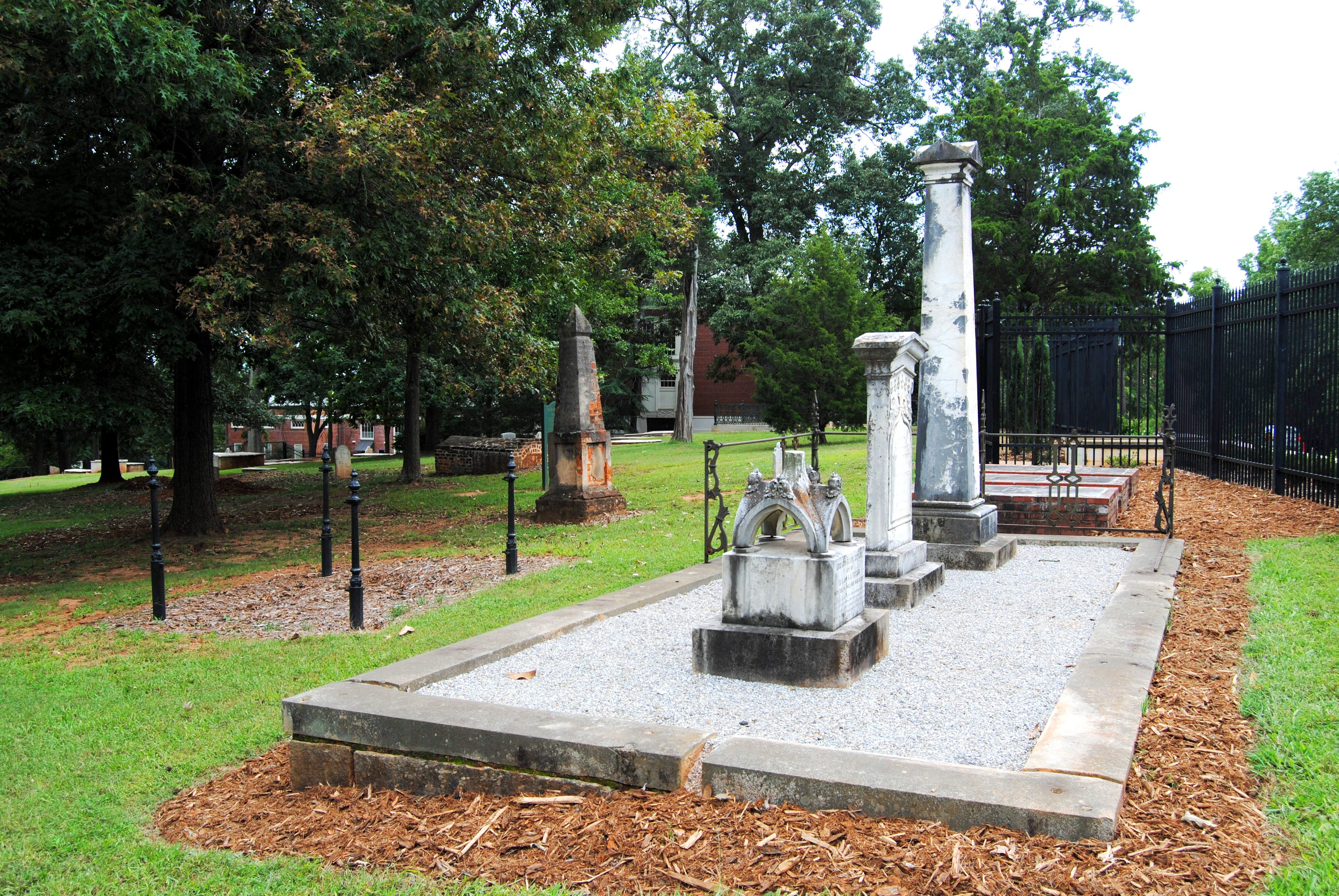

- Location within Georgia
- Coordinates: 33°57′21″N 83°22′25″W
- NRHP reference No.: 09000779

Jackson Street Cemetery, also known as Old Athens Cemetery, was the original cemetery for Athens, Georgia and is listed on the National Register of Historic Places. It was in official use as the town cemetery from about 1810 to 1856, until Oconee Hill Cemetery opened. The last known burial was in 1898.

== Location and history ==
The cemetery is situated on the University of Georgia (UGA) campus adjacent to the College of Environment + Design and Baldwin Hall (to the south) Jackson Street (to the west), and Thomas Street (to the east), "on land that was originally part of the University's land grant from the state legislature, and the school apparently donated it to the city of Athens, though Duncan says there's no official record of the transaction". The cemetery land was deeded back to UGA in 2004. The University encroached on the cemetery's original six acres, reducing it to the two and one-half acres it now occupies. The University had wanted to build on the land and tried to assert title to it in 1890, but opposition scuttled their plans.

Cramped for campus space, the University vigorously pursued [the land title] idea under Chancellor Hill. Graves were to be moved to Oconee Hill and the site used for building, but his death in December, 1905 ended this campaign.

In the 1920s plans to take over the Old cemetery were again proposed, and when Baldwin Hall was built (opened 1938) a couple of acres were indeed taken from the south end of the cemetery (and more for its parking lot). The cemetery was also targeted for use as a site for the Visual Arts Building (opened 1961), but this was "fended off" by the Athens Historical Society (while another slice of land was taken from the north end of the cemetery, as shown by old aerial photographs).

Bodies were disturbed in this process: "workers back in the 1930s removed 120 wooden boxes filled with bones from where Baldwin Hall now sits, then buried them in two 95-foot trenches in or near a pauper cemetery", and a bit of "lore" says that UGA Dean, William Tate, "rode along with the procession to give it some dignity".

In the fall of 1980 the University again proposed moving the graves to Oconee Hill, this time so that the cemetery land could be used for a parking deck. The coalition that fought this proposal "was the nucleus of the Old Athens Cemetery Foundation, Inc." It argued that the legal problems that would result from the proposal would be stupendous."

The Old Athens Cemetery consisted of 'about six acres' in 1906 and now comprises two and a half acres. It has been a victim of the ravages of time and weather, as well as deliberate vandalism, and is the subject of an ongoing restoration project by Janine Duncan, of the University of Georgia Grounds Department.

== Contemporary disinterments ==
On November 17, 2015, construction crews working on a renovation of Baldwin Hall discovered a human skull. Construction was paused, and additional graves have been located. "UGA is working closely with the appropriate state agencies to ensure that the remains from up to 27 gravesites are properly removed and re-interred." A total 105 people's remains were removed, of which 30 had enough DNA for analysis. Of those, 27 were African American and would have been enslaved people. Leaders of the African American community in Athens want the remains to be reinterred in one of the predominately African American cemeteries in town, either Brooklyn Cemetery or Gospel Pilgrim Cemetery. However, UGA says that it is following the direction of the State Archaeologist's Office in placing the bodies in Oconee Hill Cemetery.

== Notable interments ==
- Charles Dougherty
- Robert Finley
