= 1832 Rhode Island gubernatorial election =

- April 4, 1832
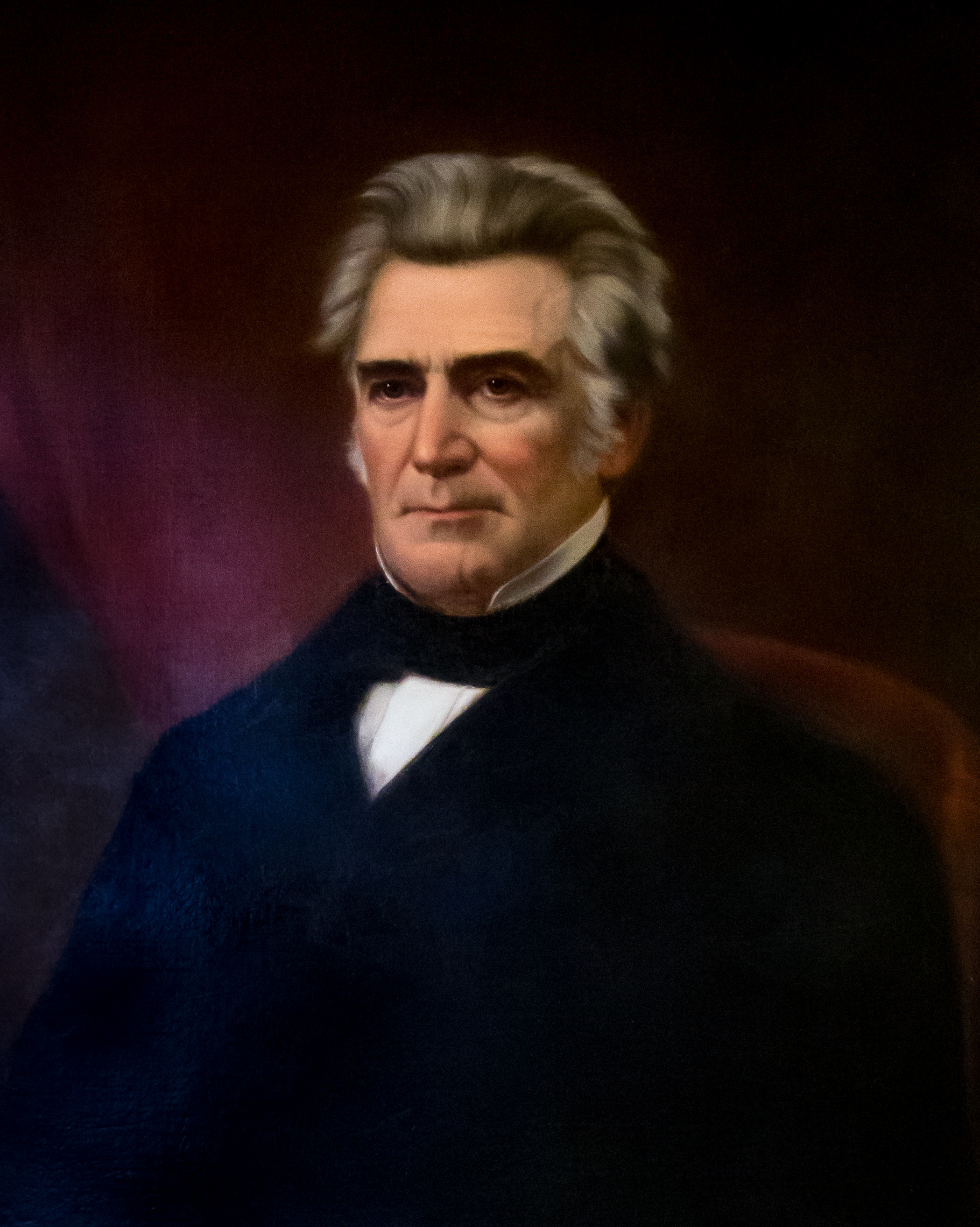

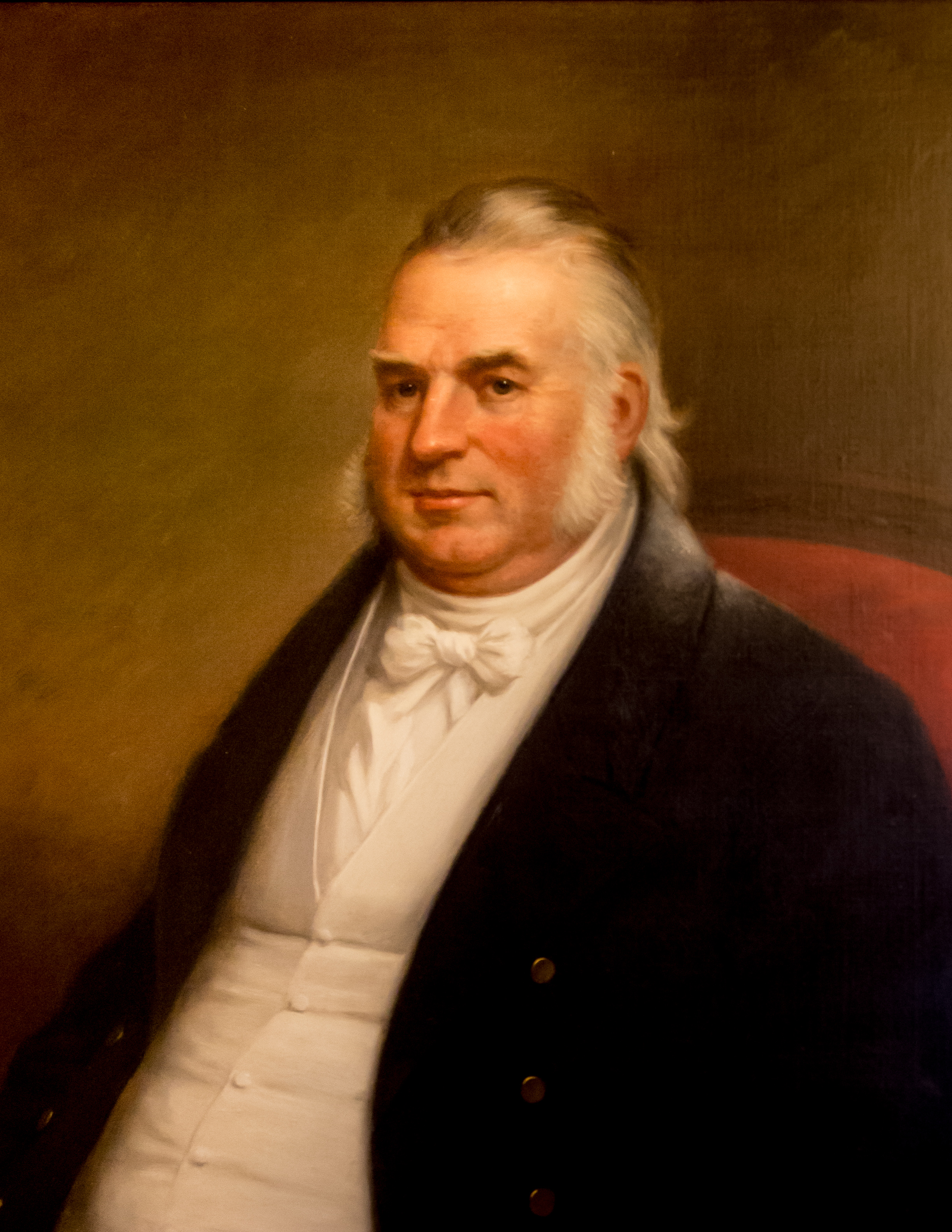

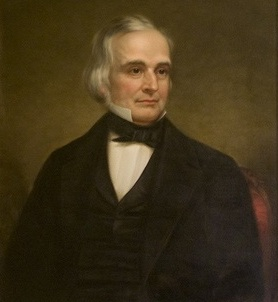
| Nominee | Lemuel H. Arnold | James Fenner | William Sprague III |
| Party | National Republican | Democratic-Republican | Anti-Masonic |
| Popular vote | 2,730 | 2,290 | 610 |
| Percentage | 48.42% | 40.62% | 10.82% |
- County results Arnold: 40–50% 50–60% Fenner: 50–60%
Governor before election
Lemuel H. Arnold
National Republican
Elected Governor
Lemuel H. Arnold
National Republican

The 1832 Rhode Island gubernatorial election was held on April 4, 1832, in order to elect the governor of Rhode Island. Incumbent National Republican governor Lemuel H. Arnold won a plurality of the vote against former Democratic-Republican governor James Fenner and incumbent Anti-Masonic Speaker of the Rhode Island House of Representatives William Sprague III. However, as no candidate received a majority of the total votes cast as was required by Rhode Island law, run-offs were held until a candidate received a majority. Following four run-offs which were held on May 16, July 18, August 28 and November 21, no candidate was able to receive a majority. So Governor Arnold remained to serve as governor during the run-offs and in January 1833, the Rhode Island state legislature formalized Governor Arnold's win as he had come in first place in every election and run-off that was held. This permitted him to continue on as governor until the end of the term on May 1, 1833.

== General election ==
On election day, April 4, 1832, incumbent National Republican governor Lemuel H. Arnold won the election by a margin of 440 votes against his foremost opponent former Democratic-Republican governor James Fenner. However, as no candidate had received a majority of the vote, several run-offs were held, all won by Governor Arnold but again without a majority. So the Rhode Island state legislature formalized Governor Arnold's win in January 1833, and he was allowed to serve out the rest of the term. He thereby retained National Republican control over the office of governor. Arnold was sworn in for his second term on May 1, 1832, so he could remain as governor amidst the awaiting scheduled run-offs.

== Results ==
=== General election ===
Results 4 April
| Party | Candidate | Votes | % |
|---|---|---|---|
| National Republican | Lemuel H. Arnold (incumbent) | 2,730 | 48.42 |
| Democratic-Republican | James Fenner | 2,290 | 40.62 |
| Anti-Masonic | William Sprague III | 610 | 10.82 |
| | Scattering | 8 | 0.14 |
| Total votes | | 5,638 | 100.00 |

=== First Runoff ===
Results 16 May
| Party | Candidate | Votes | % |
|---|---|---|---|
| National Republican | Lemuel H. Arnold (incumbent) | 3,309 | 47.55 |
| Democratic-Republican | James Fenner | 2,940 | 42.25 |
| Anti-Masonic | William Sprague III | 698 | 10.03 |
| | Scattering | 12 | 0.17 |
| Total votes | | 6,959 | 100.00 |

=== Second Runoff ===
Results 18 July
| Party | Candidate | Votes | % |
|---|---|---|---|
| National Republican | Lemuel H. Arnold (incumbent) | 2,721 | 46.43 |
| Democratic-Republican | James Fenner | 2,341 | 39.95 |
| Anti-Masonic | William Sprague III | 792 | 13.52 |
| | Scattering | 6 | 0.10 |
| Total votes | | 5,860 | 100.00 |

=== Third Runoff ===
Results 28 August
| Party | Candidate | Votes | % |
|---|---|---|---|
| National Republican | Lemuel H. Arnold (incumbent) | 3,062 | 45.39 |
| Democratic-Republican | James Fenner | 2,715 | 40.25 |
| Anti-Masonic | William Sprague III | 967 | 14.33 |
| | Scattering | 2 | 0.03 |
| Total votes | | 6,746 | 100.00 |

=== Fourth Runoff ===
Results 21 November
| Party | Candidate | Votes | % |
|---|---|---|---|
| National Republican | Lemuel H. Arnold (incumbent) | 2,880 | 47.78 |
| Democratic-Republican | James Fenner | 2,306 | 38.26 |
| Anti-Masonic | William Sprague III | 832 | 13.80 |
| | Scattering | 10 | 0.16 |
| Total votes | | 6,028 | 100.00 |
| National Republican hold | | | |
