= Tomlinson Fort (Georgia politician) =

American politician (1787–1859)

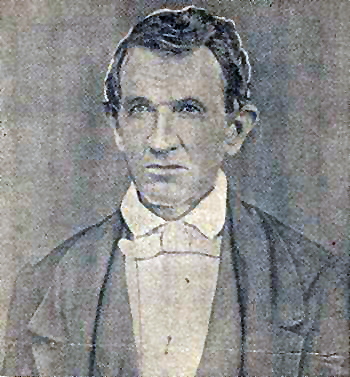

Member of the U.S. House of Representatives from Georgia's 6th district
- In office March 4, 1827 – March 3, 1829
- Preceded by: district created
- Succeeded by: Howell Cobb

Member of the Georgia House of Representatives
- In office 1818–1826

Personal details
- Born: July 14, 1787 Warrenton, Georgia
- Died: May 11, 1859 (aged 71) Milledgeville, Georgia
- Resting place: City Cemetery
- Party: Jacksonian
- Relatives: Edwin Jemison (great-nephew)
- Occupation: Physician, banker

Military service
- Rank: Captain
- Battles/wars: War of 1812

Tomlinson Fort (July 14, 1787 – May 11, 1859) was a medical doctor, politician, and banker in the state of Georgia during the first half of the nineteenth century. He was a member of the Georgia House of Representatives and United States House of Representatives from Georgia.

Tomlinson Fort had built what was to become the Tomlinson Fort House (Milledgeville, Georgia) for his wife Martha Fannin Fort and their children in 1820. The house was located in the Milledgeville Historic District.

== Early years and education ==
Fort was born in Warrenton, Georgia on July 14, 1787. He completed preparatory studies and then embarked on the study of medicine. In 1809, he received one term of medical training at the Philadelphia Medical College, and commenced practice in 1810 after moving to Milledgeville, Ga.

During the War of 1812, Fort enlisted in a volunteer company of Georgia Militia, and was elected captain. He was to sustain a wound during this time that would be his eventual cause of death at the age of 72.

== Political career ==
Fort was a member of the Georgia House of Representatives for four terms, being elected annually from 1818 to 1826. He was elected as a Jacksonian candidate to the 20th United States Congress and served one term from March 4, 1827, to March 3, 1829.

During his tenure in the State Legislature, he was instrumental in the formation of the Medical College of Georgia, as well as the state lunatic asylum in Milledgeville.

He ended his political career as Mayor of Milledgeville (1847–1848).

== Later years ==
He resumed the practice of medicine in Milledgeville, Georgia after the state and us terms.

He rose to president of the State Bank of Georgia, during which time he helped finance construction of the Western and Atlantic Railroad.

Tomlinson Fort died on May 11, 1859, in Milledgeville. He is buried in the City Cemetery.

== Other references ==
- Roberts, William C. (1968). "Tomlinson Fort of Milledgeville, Georgia: Physician and Statesman". Journal of the History of Medicine and Allied Sciences. 23 (2): 131–152. doi:10.1093/jhmas/xxiii.2.131. JSTOR 24623906. PMID 4870786.

U.S. House of Representatives
Preceded by George Cary	Member of the U.S. House of Representatives from Georgia's at-large congressional district March 4, 1827 – March 3, 1829	Succeeded by Henry Graybill Lamar
