= Anthony Colby =

American businessman and politician (1792–1873)

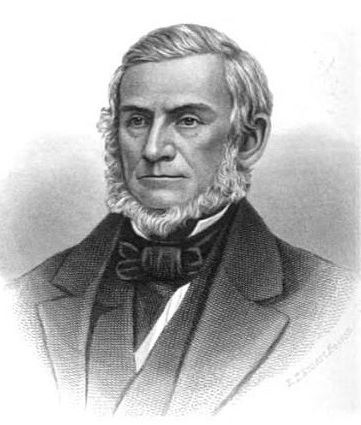

20th Governor of New Hampshire
- In office June 4, 1846 – June 3, 1847
- Preceded by: John Hardy Steele
- Succeeded by: Jared W. Williams

Member of the New Hampshire House of Representatives
- In office 1828–1832; 1837–1839

Personal details
- Born: November 13, 1792 New London, New Hampshire, U.S.
- Died: July 20, 1873 (aged 80) New London, New Hampshire, U.S.
- Party: Whig
- Spouse(s): Mary Everett; Eliza Messenger Richardson
- Children: Susan Farnum Colby; Robert Lane Colby
- Profession: Business executive Manufacturer

Anthony Colby (November 13, 1792 – July 20, 1873) was an American businessman and politician from New London, New Hampshire. He owned and operated a grist mill and a stage line, and served as the 20th governor of New Hampshire from 1846 to 1847.

== Biography ==
Colby was born in New London, New Hampshire, on November 13, 1792. He was educated locally and became a successful business owner and operator, with his ventures including a stagecoach line, gristmill, and factory for producing scythes.

He was also active in the militia, serving as an ensign during the War of 1812, and attaining the rank of major general in 1837.

Colby entered politics as a member of the New Hampshire House of Representatives, serving from 1828 to 1832 and 1837 to 1839. He was an unsuccessful candidate for Congress in 1833 and 1835, and ran unsuccessfully for governor in 1843, 1844 and 1845.

In 1846, Colby ran for governor as the Whig nominee. He originally placed second to Democrat Jared W. Williams, receiving 32% of the vote to Williams's 48%. However, the state constitution imposed a majority-vote requirement in gubernatorial elections, so the failure of any candidate in the race to win a majority threw the election to the General Court. A Whig–Liberty Party–Independent Democrat coalition, led by Independent Democrat John P. Hale, won control of the state government and elected Colby as Governor over Williams. Colby served from June 4, 1846, to June 3, 1847. He ran unsuccessfully for re-election in 1847, in which he lost to Williams.

After leaving the governorship, Colby remained active in business, the military and politics. He served again in the New Hampshire House from 1860 to 1861, and during the American Civil War served as Adjutant General of the New Hampshire Militia from 1861 to 1863. He then became provost marshal of the militia, with his son Daniel succeeding him as adjutant general.

Colby was interested in higher education. He was a trustee of Dartmouth College from 1850 to 1870, and received an honorary Master of Arts from Dartmouth in 1850. He was also the founder of Colby Academy, which through expansions and mergers is now known as Colby-Sawyer College.

Colby died in New London on July 20, 1873, and was buried in New London's Old Main Street Cemetery.

Colby's papers are held at Colby-Sawyer College.

Party political offices
Preceded by Enos Stevens	Whig nominee for Governor of New Hampshire; 1843, 1844, 1845, 1846, 1847	Succeeded by Nathaniel S. Berry
Political offices
Preceded by John H. Steele	Governor of New Hampshire; 1846–1847	Succeeded by Jared W. Williams
