= John Hardy Steele =

American politician

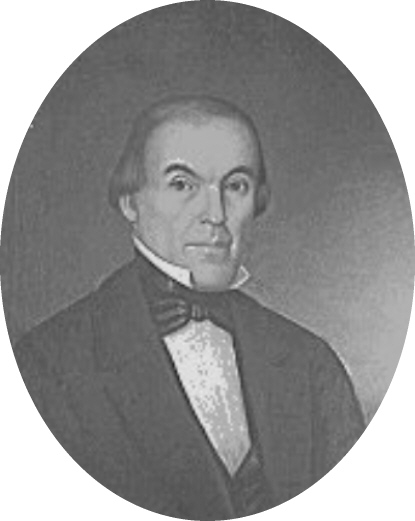

19th Governor of New Hampshire
- In office June 6, 1844 – June 4, 1846
- Preceded by: Henry Hubbard
- Succeeded by: Anthony Colby

Member of the New Hampshire House of Representatives
- In office 1829

Personal details
- Born: January 4, 1789 Salisbury, North Carolina, U.S.
- Died: July 3, 1865 (aged 76) Peterborough, New Hampshire, U.S.
- Party: Democratic
- Spouse(s): Jane Moore (died July 30, 1831); Nancy Moore (died February 27, 1870)
- Profession: Business executive Manufacturer

John Hardy Steele (January 4, 1789 – July 3, 1865) served as the 19th governor of New Hampshire from 1844 to 1846.

== Early life ==
John H. Steele was born in Salisbury, North Carolina, on January 4, 1789. His mother, Elizabeth Taylor, was unmarried. His father, John Steele was married to another woman, and was the father of several children with his wife.

As a result of the circumstances of his parentage and the early death of his mother, John Hardy Steele was raised primarily by his maternal grandfather, Absalom Taylor.

Steele was educated in Salisbury, and at age 14 was apprenticed as a cabinetmaker and chair maker. At age 22 Steele settled in Fayetteville, where he worked at his trade for Nathaniel Morison, a native of Peterborough, New Hampshire. Morison was impressed with Steele's mechanical aptitude, and asked Steele to accompany him to New Hampshire to establish a textile manufacturing business. Steele designed and constructed the spinning mules and looms for Morison's mills, one of which was the first to weave cotton cloth by waterpower.

== Later career ==
In 1824 Steele joined several partners to establish the Union Manufacturing Company, a cloth production factory which operated successfully with Steele as manager.

A Democrat in a town that was predominantly Whig in its politics, Steele was popular enough personally to win election to the New Hampshire House of Representatives in 1829. He declined reelection, and also declined an 1831 nomination for a seat in the New Hampshire State Senate. From 1830 to 1838 Steele served as Peterborough's Town Meeting Moderator.

Steele was also active in the New Hampshire Militia, and attained the rank of colonel as aide-de-camp to Governor Matthew Harvey.

In 1840 Steele won election to the Executive Council of New Hampshire, and he was reelected in 1841.

== Governor ==
Steele was elected Governor in 1844, and reelected in 1845. His term was marked by the creation of a state railroad commission. In addition, Steele provided letters of introduction to James Knox Polk and members of Polk's cabinet for his friend Jesse Carter Little, a Mormon pioneer who sought government assistance to enable the Mormons to begin settling in Utah.

== Post-governorship ==
After leaving office Steele retired to a farm, where he conducted experiments in animal husbandry and other scientific agriculture techniques. He was an organizer and President of the Peterborough Savings Bank. He served as a Selectman in 1846, and in 1850 he was a delegate to New Hampshire's constitutional convention.

== Death and burial ==
Steele died in Peterborough on July 3, 1865, and was buried in the Village Cemetery.

Party political offices
Preceded by Henry Hubbard	Democratic nominee for Governor of New Hampshire; 1844, 1845	Succeeded by Jared W. Williams
Political offices
Preceded by Henry Hubbard	Governor of New Hampshire; 1844–1846	Succeeded by Anthony Colby
