= William Schley =

American politician (1786–1858)

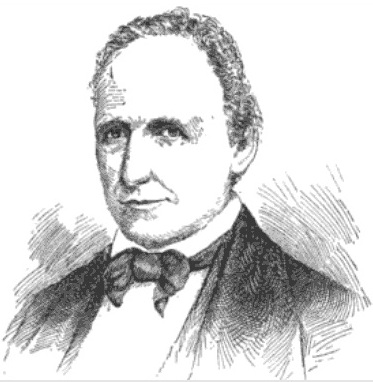

36th Governor of Georgia
- In office November 4, 1835 – November 8, 1837
- Preceded by: Wilson Lumpkin
- Succeeded by: George R. Gilmer

Member of the U.S. House of Representatives from Georgia's at-large congressional district
- In office March 4, 1833 – July 1, 1835
- Preceded by: Henry G. Lamar
- Succeeded by: Jesse F. Cleveland

Member of the Georgia House of Representatives
- In office 1830–1830

Personal details
- Born: December 15, 1786 Frederick, Maryland, U.S.
- Died: November 20, 1858 (aged 71) Augusta, Georgia, U.S.

William Schley (/slaɪ/ SLY; December 15, 1786 – November 20, 1858) was an American lawyer, jurist, and politician who served as governor of Georgia from 1835 to 1837.

== Biography ==
Schley was born on December 15 (some sources say December 10), 1786, in Frederick, Maryland, the original domicile of the Schley family in North America. With others of the family he migrated to Augusta, Georgia, in the early 19th century, where he was educated at the academies of Louisville and Augusta. He later studied law, was admitted to the bar in 1812 and practiced law in Augusta. From 1825 through 1828 he was a Superior Court judge of the Middle District in Georgia.

In 1830, Schley became a member of the Georgia House of Representatives. In 1832 and again in 1834, he was elected as a Democrat to the United States House of Representatives. He resigned from that position to become the 36th governor of Georgia from 1835 until 1837.

During his gubernatorial term, Schley initiated the creation of the Western and Atlantic Railroad. He also advocated the establishment of a lunatic asylum and a geological survey of the state. Schley published a Digest of the English Statutes in Force in Georgia (Philadelphia, 1826). He was an ardent Democrat and strict constructionist.

He died in Augusta in 1858 and was buried in that same city in the Schley family cemetery. Schley County, Georgia is named his honor.

== Notes ==
U.S. House of Representatives
Preceded by Henry G. Lamar	Member of the U.S. House of Representatives from Georgia's at-large congressional district March 4, 1833 – July 1, 1835	Succeeded by Jesse F. Cleveland
Political offices
Preceded by Wilson Lumpkin	Governor of Georgia; 1835–1837	Succeeded by George R. Gimer
