= Charles Dougherty (Georgia politician) =

American politician and lawyer

Charles Dougherty (1801 – November 26, 1853) was an American lawyer, jurist, and politician.

== Early life and education ==
Born in Oglethorpe County, Georgia to Charles and Rebecca Carlton Puryear Dougherty, the younger Dougherty studied law and began its practice in Athens, Georgia. He became a leader in the Whig party as well as a judge in the Western Circuit of the state. He married Elizabeth T. Moore on December 7, 1823, in Clarke County, Georgia.

== Career ==
In 1839, Dougherty ran as the Whig candidate for Governor of Georgia but lost by 2,000 votes to the Democratic candidate Charles McDonald.

Dougherty died in Athens in 1853 and was buried in the Old Athens Cemetery. (He and his wife are believed to have been re-interred in Oconee Hill Cemetery, also in Athens. See page 189, Oconee Hill Cemetery of Athens, Georgia, vol. I by Charlotte Thomas Marshall, 2009. The hyperlinked image was taken in Old Athens Cemetery.) His namesake, Dougherty County, Georgia, was created by the Georgia General Assembly on December 15, 1853.
