= Samuel Dickie =

American politician

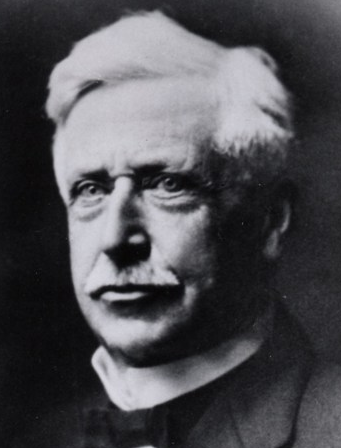

6th Chairman of the Prohibition Party
- In office 1887 – December 31, 1899
- Preceded by: John B. Finch
- Succeeded by: Oliver W. Stewart

9th Mayor of Albion, Michigan
- In office 1896–1897
- Preceded by: William B. Knickerbocker
- Succeeded by: Arza L. McCutcheon

7th President of Albion College
- In office 1901–1921
- Preceded by: John P. Ashley
- Succeeded by: John W. Laird

Personal details
- Born: June 6, 1851 Burford, Ontario, Province of Canada
- Died: November 5, 1925 (aged 74) Albion, Michigan, U.S.
- Party: Prohibition
- Other political affiliations: Republican
- Spouse: Mary Augusta Brockway (m. 1850)
- Children: 4
- Parents: William Dickie (father); Jane McNabb (mother)
- Education: Albion College (BA)

Samuel Dickie (June 6, 1851 – November 5, 1925) was an American politician who was active in the Prohibition Party.

== Life ==
Samuel Dickie was born on June 6, 1851, to William Dickie and Jane McNabb, Scottish immigrants, in Burford, Ontario. In 1858, his family immigrated to the United States and moved to Lansing, Michigan. In 1869, he enrolled into Albion College and graduated with a Bachelor of Arts in 1872 as the valedictorian of his class. In 1877, he became a mathematics and astronomy professor at Albion College and would remain in those positions until December 1887. On December 22, 1878, he married Mary Augusta Brockway, the daughter of W. H. Brockway who helped found Albion College, and would later have four children with her.

=== Politics ===
In 1887, he was selected to replace John B. Finch as chairman of the Prohibition Party following Finch's death and remained in the position until 1900. In 1886, he ran in the Michigan gubernatorial election and received the highest amount of support for any Michigan Prohibition gubernatorial candidate. On March 20, 1896, he was given the Prohibition nomination for Mayor of Albion, Michigan and won with a plurality of thirteen votes.

In 1896, he presided over the Prohibition national convention and was one of the leaders of the narrow gauger faction which only wanted to include the prohibition of alcohol in the party's platform and successfully defeated the broad gaugers under the leadership of John St. John. On December 31, 1899, he resigned from the chairmanship of the party so that he and John G. Woolley could purchase and worked together on the New Voice, a prohibition journal, and did so until 1901.

In 1909, he debated Milwaukee Mayor David S. Rose twice and was considered the winner in both debates. During the second debate Calhoun County officially became a dry county and during the night an anti-prohibition mob surrounded his home, with only his daughter inside, and threatened to burn the building down until students from Albion College drove them away.

Following the passage of the Eighteenth Amendment, banning the sale and consumption of alcohol, he left the Prohibition Party and joined the Republican Party.

=== Later life ===
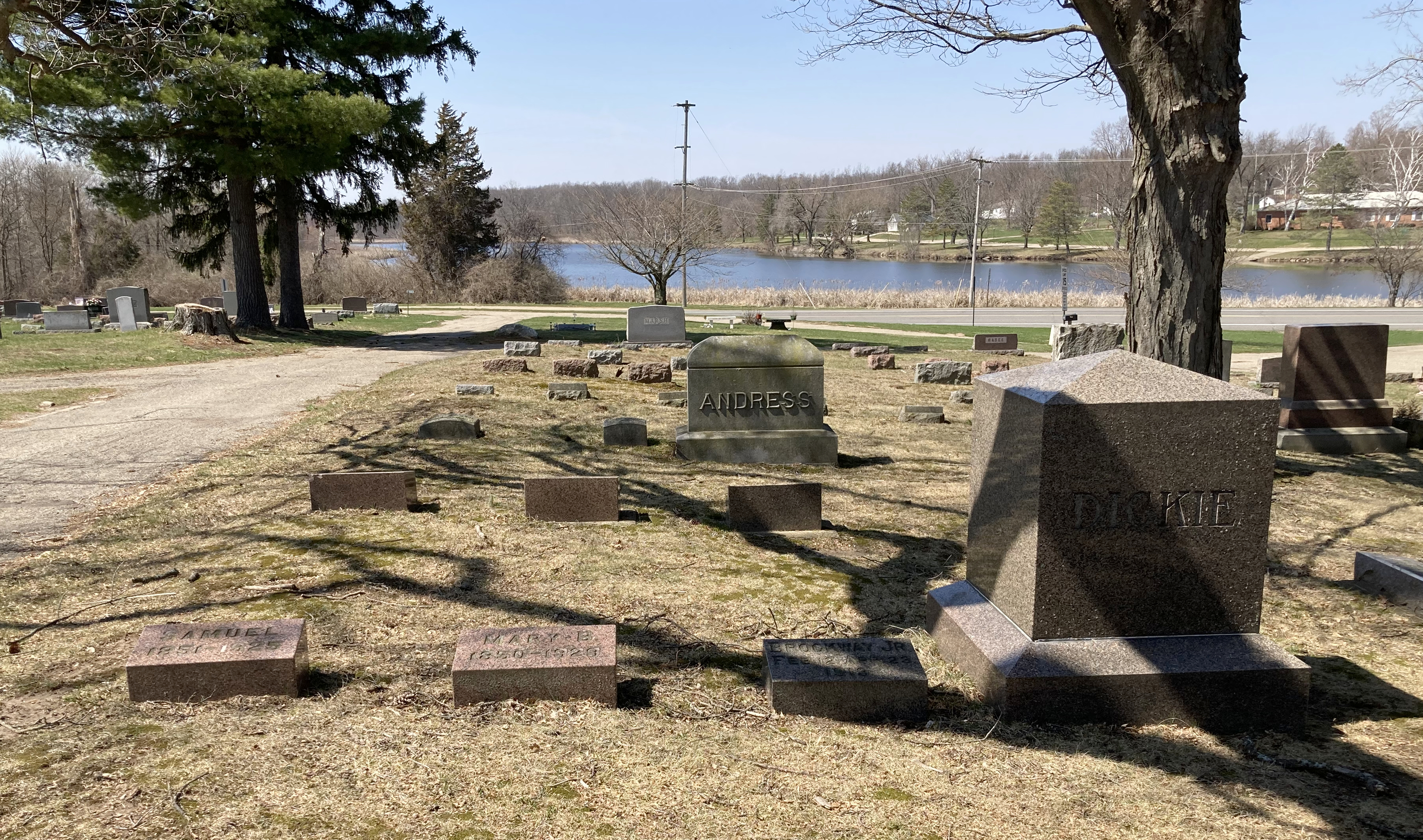
Dickie's grave at Riverside Cemetery

In 1898, Daniel Striker, the chairman and treasurer of the Albion College Endowment Fund committee, died and was replaced by Dickie. In 1901, he was elected to succeed John P. Ashley as president of Albion College and would serve in that position until his retirement in 1921. In 1923, he was made the first president of the Albion Chamber of Commerce.

In 1921, he became a naturalized United States citizen after his passport was rejected while planning to give a European speaking tour. On November 5, 1925, he died from a heart attack at his home while sleeping. He was buried at Riverside Cemetery in Albion.

== Electoral history ==
Samuel Dickie electoral history

1878 Michigan Third Congressional district election
| Party | Candidate | Votes | % | ±% |
|---|---|---|---|---|
| Republican | Jonas H. McGowan (incumbent) | 14,381 | 41.68% | −10.16% |
| Greenback | John Dawson | 12,347 | 35.78% | +33.11% |
| Democratic | James S. Upton | 6,341 | 18.38% | −26.54% |
| Prohibition | Samuel Dickie | 1,436 | 4.16% | +3.59% |
| Total votes | | 34,505 | 100.00% | |

1884 Michigan gubernatorial election
| Party | Candidate | Votes | % | ±% |
|---|---|---|---|---|
| Republican | Cyrus G. Luce | 181,474 | 47.65% | −0.02% |
| Fusion Party | George L. Yaple | 174,042 | 45.69% | N/A |
| Prohibition | Samuel Dickie | 25,179 | 6.61% | +1.06% |
| Write-in | | 190 | 0.05% | +0.04% |
| Total votes | | 380,885 | 100.00% | |

1890 Michigan Third Congressional district election
| Party | Candidate | Votes | % | ±% |
|---|---|---|---|---|
| Republican | James O'Donnell (incumbent) | 16,679 | 44.47% | −9.05% |
| Democratic | John W. Fletcher | 14,216 | 37.90% | −0.96% |
| Industrial | Robert Fraser | 3,423 | 9.13% | +9.13% |
| Prohibition | Samuel Dickie | 3,187 | 8.50% | +2.70% |
| Total votes | | 37,505 | 100.00% | |

Party political offices
| Preceded by David Preston | Prohibition nominee for Governor of Michigan; 1886 | Succeeded by Amherst B. Cheney |
