= Wellington R. Burt =

American politician

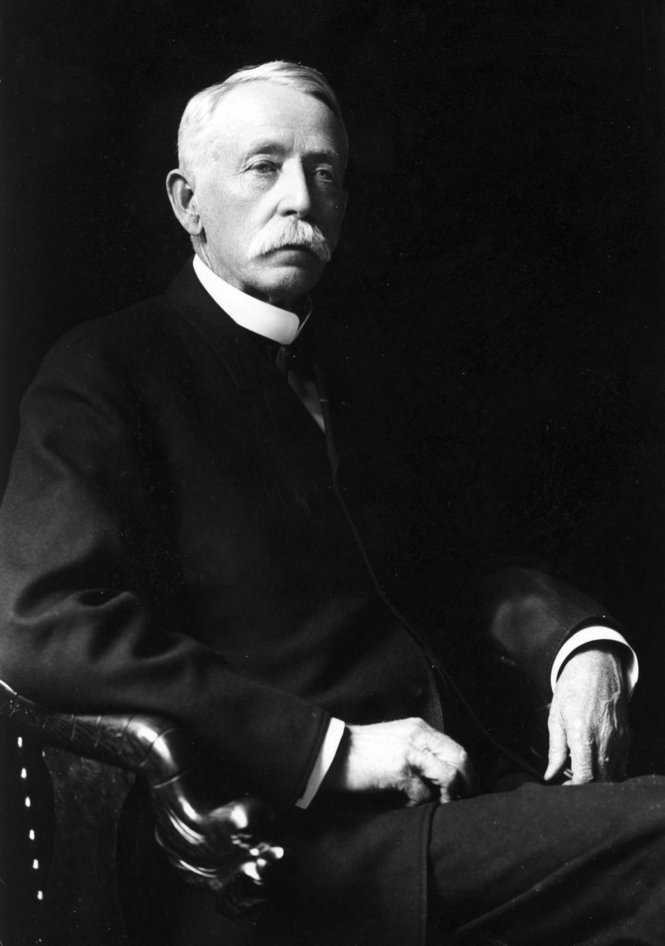

Mayor of East Saginaw
- In office 1867–1868
- Preceded by: Dwight G. Holland
- Succeeded by: James L. Ketcham

Member of the Michigan Senate from the 22nd district
- In office 1893–1894
- Preceded by: Enoch T. Mugford
- Succeeded by: Emory Townsend

Personal details
- Born: August 26, 1831 Pike, New York, US
- Died: March 2, 1919 (aged 87) Saginaw, Michigan, US
- Resting place: Forest Lawn Cemetery; Saginaw, Michigan
- Party: Democratic
- Other political affiliations: Fusion
- Spouses: Sarah Torrans (m. 1860; died 1867); Mary Amina Richardson (m. 1869; died 1904)
- Children: Hattie May, Jennie, Emma, Gertrude, Charles, George, Marvin
- Parent(s): Luther Burt, Florinda Horton
- Education: Albion College (1yr); Michigan Central College Hillsdale College (1yr)
- Profession: Timber, iron, rail, finance, salt

Wellington R. Burt (August 26, 1831 – March 2, 1919) was an American lumber baron from Saginaw, Michigan. At the time of his death, his wealth was estimated to be between $40 and $90 million (equivalent to between $743 million and $1.67 billion in 2025). For a time in the early 1900s, Burt ranked as one of the eight wealthiest men in the United States. He was best known for his lumber mills and timber holdings, but was also involved in iron mining, railroads, salt mines, and finances. Burt was a politician, holding the offices of Mayor of East Saginaw (1867–68) and member of the Michigan Senate (1893–94). In his final years, he lived alone in a mansion with his servants. Estranged from friends and family and nicknamed "The Lone Pine of Michigan", he officially died of "senility" at age 87.

Burt had an unusual will, "as bizarre but as finely-wrought as any in U.S. court annals". It contained a "spite clause" conceived by Burt to avenge a family feud. It specified to wait 21 years after his children and grandchildren were dead before the bulk of the fortune could go to any descendants, in effect alienating his children and grandchildren from the estate, beyond some small annuities. The conditions of the will were met in 2010 after the 1989 death of his last grandchild. In May 2011, twelve of Burt's descendants finally received the estate, worth about $100 million.

Burt's legacy today is mixed, seen as a vindictive old man, a generous benefactor of the city of Saginaw and a famously wealthy American entrepreneur.

== Biography ==
Burt was born on August 26, 1831, in the town of Pike, a small town in Western New York state, the ninth of thirteen siblings and the eldest son. His father was Luther Burt and his mother Florinda Horton Burt. The Burts were poor farmers who came from an old New England line, tracing back to Henry Burt, who had settled from Scotland in 1640. The Burt lineage included William Austin Burt (1792–1858), who was a notable Michigan surveyor described as "the father of the typewriter".

At the age of seven, he moved with his parents to Jackson County, Michigan, where he worked on the family farm. Michigan had only been a state since January 1837–a mere year or two before the Burt family arrived—and Burt's subsequent life and career as a first generation Michigander was often identified with the growth and progress of the new state. In 1843, when Wellington was 12, his father Luther died. Under the guidance of his mother, he became the farm's manager and "entered into the struggle incident to pioneer life". He attended two years of college one at Albion College and one at Michigan Central College (now Hillsdale College). At the age of 22, he decided to see the world and obtained work as a sailor abroad on freighters in Australia, Central and South America, and New Zealand. He would recall Australia as his favorite foreign country.

When he returned home in 1857 at age 26, he found a burgeoning timber industry in Michigan, the "Green Gold Rush". He took a job earning $13 a month at the Pine River lumber camp near St. Louis, Michigan and within a month was promoted to camp foreman with double wages. He was "tall, strong and knew how to give orders". Using savings, he started his own lumber company in 1858, buying 300 acres in Gratiot County. In 1867, he founded the community of Melbourne on the Saginaw River near Zilwaukee, Michigan, named after his favorite city in Australia. By 1870, Melbourne was among the largest and most complete mills in the world, but in 1876, it was destroyed by a fire of unknown origin. Many at the time thought this would be the end of Burt's fortunes, but he also owned timber land elsewhere, including in St. Louis County, Minnesota, which turned out to be favourable for him, as it was in the heart of the immensely valuable Mesabi iron range. In addition to his various timber and iron mine holdings, Burt made his fortune in the salt industry, in railroads and in foreign bonds and banking investments. He invested in the former CS&M Railroad (running between Durand and Bay City) and for a time, owned most of the Ann Arbor Railroad system. He also bought railways in Russia and China. He had plans to build a sugar beet factory in Owosso, Michigan, but the idea failed to come to fruition.

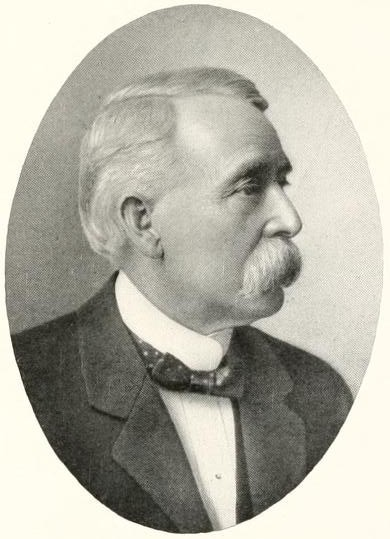

Burt's political career included time as mayor of East Saginaw in 1867 and 1868, and as unsuccessful Fusion candidate for the position of Governor of Michigan in 1888. He was elected member of the Michigan State Senate 22nd District for 1893–94 again under the Fusion ticket, as Democratic candidate for U.S. Representative from Michigan 8th District in 1900, and as delegate to the Michigan state constitutional convention from 1907 to 1908. "In the capitol at Lansing", one Saginaw News account read, "Sen. Burt was more conspicuous for his political naiveté than for any distinguished act of statesmanship. They said he tried hard, but to him, politics were strange shenanigans. You smiled and joked when you meant to kick a man's shins."

Later in his life, Burt lived alone in a three-story brick mansion at Cherry St. and E. Genesee Ave. It was demolished in 1959 and today is a parking lot. With failing eyesight and hearing, he was taken care of by servants. Due to his isolation from his family and social circles in later years, he was known as "The Lone Pine of Michigan". He had radical stomach surgery at the age of 80. His death certificate lists his cause of death as "senility". He is buried in Forest Lawn Cemetery, Saginaw County Michigan. (Section 8, Plot 1.)

Burt was married twice and had seven children, three daughters from the first wife and one daughter and three younger sons from the second wife. His first wife was Sarah Torrans (1833–1867), whom he married May 22, 1860; his second was Armine Mary Richardson (1839–1904), whom he married February 10, 1869.

== Will ==
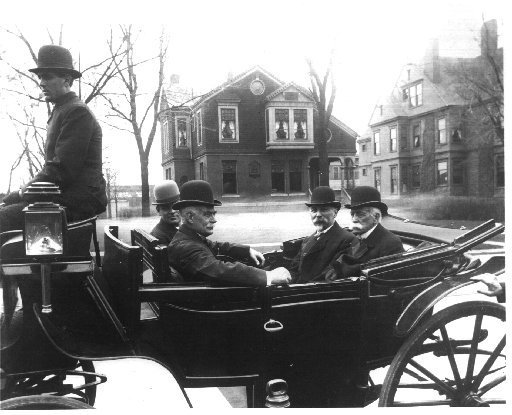
Dignitaries at the construction site of Saginaw's City Auditorium in 1908. From left to right: Unknown driver, Edward Hartwick, Congressman William S. Linton, Mayor William B. Baum, Wellington R. Burt.

Burt had one of the more bizarre wills in American legal history. It contained a "spite clause" which specified to wait until his children and grandchildren were dead before the estate could be dispersed to any descendants yet unborn in Burt's lifetime. However, his children did receive relatively small annuities (when compared to the total size of his estate) of $1,000 to $5,000 each, except for one favorite son who received $30,000 annually, and one unfavored daughter who got nothing. His secretary received $4,000 annually, more than most of his children, while a cook, housekeeper, coachman, and chauffeur each received $1,000 annually.

Burt's will stipulated that the bulk of his estate was to be held in a trust until "21 years after [the death of] my last surviving grandchild [who was alive] at the time of my death" (the longest delay allowable under the Rule Against Perpetuities). This condition was met in 2010, 21 years after the November 1989 death of Burt's last grandchild, Marion Lansill. In May 2011, after time for legal negotiations, the fortune was finally distributed to his descendants. The estate was estimated in total at $100 million to $110 million. It was split between twelve descendants, weighted based on age seniority. They included three great-grandchildren; seven great-great-grandchildren; and two great-great-great-grandchildren – the youngest beneficiary was 19 and the oldest 94. The biggest beneficiary received between $14.5 to $16 million, with the smallest beneficiary between $2.6 to $2.9 million. In the end, thirty of Burt's descendants, including children and grandchildren, missed out on the inheritance because they were ineligible or died before the will's conditions were met.

It is not entirely clear why Burt made such an unusual will, but newspaper records suggest family feuds were likely at the core of his decision. The will was challenged by his children after he died. A legal hole was found in 1920 because part of the estate was composed of iron leases in Minnesota, and Minnesota had a law against trusts of such long standing. This portion of the estate, amounting to $5 million, was distributed to Burt's children and grandchildren (a son, three daughters, and four granddaughters). In 1961, an additional $720,000 was taken from the trust in settlement of a suit filed by nine heirs and the estates of three other descendants.

== Legacy ==
Burt's legacy is mixed. On the one hand, he was once a famous and successful businessman who contributed to the community in many ways, and he was generally well regarded in his lifetime. On the other hand, he is best known today for his bizarre will, giving him the reputation of a vindictive old man. Saginaw historian Thomas B. Mudd said, "For a while, I took Wellington R. Burt as a selfish rich guy, but the picture that emerges is of someone who also threw himself into the community".

Burt could be tough, and not just with his children. Burt had originally devised millions in his will to the city, but retracted it when Saginaw officials increased his South Jefferson property assessment from $400,000 to $1 million four years before he died in 1919. One well-known story recounts how Burt ordered some horses at the lumber mill to be starved and worked to death, "Mr. Callam, the horses are too fat", Burt reportedly said. "Trim them down, sir, and when the logs are out, dispose of them." Mr. Callam refused to starve and kill the horses, so Burt fired him and found someone who would carry it out.

Burt was generous in life and honored after death. His charitable giving to Saginaw during his lifetime was extensive, including funding the City Auditorium, the Burt Manual Training School, a women's hospital, a Salvation Army and a YWCA that later became Jacobson's. The town of Burt, Michigan, is named for him, as is Burt Street in Saginaw, which borders the same block as his former home. The Burt Opera House in Taymouth Township carries his name and is still in use today as a community center. Trips on the paddle steamer Wellington R. Burt were once a popular day excursion along the Saginaw River (1876–1891). Burt was inducted into the Saginaw Hall of Fame in 1967.

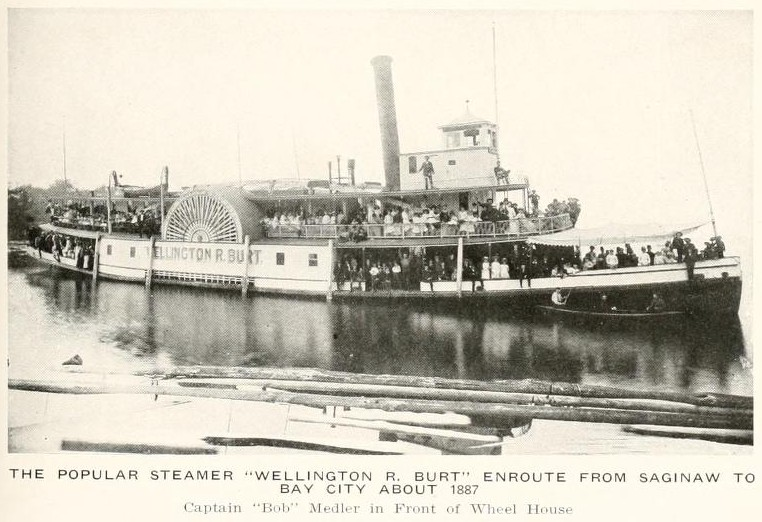
The popular side-wheeler paddle steamer Wellington R. Burt c. 1887

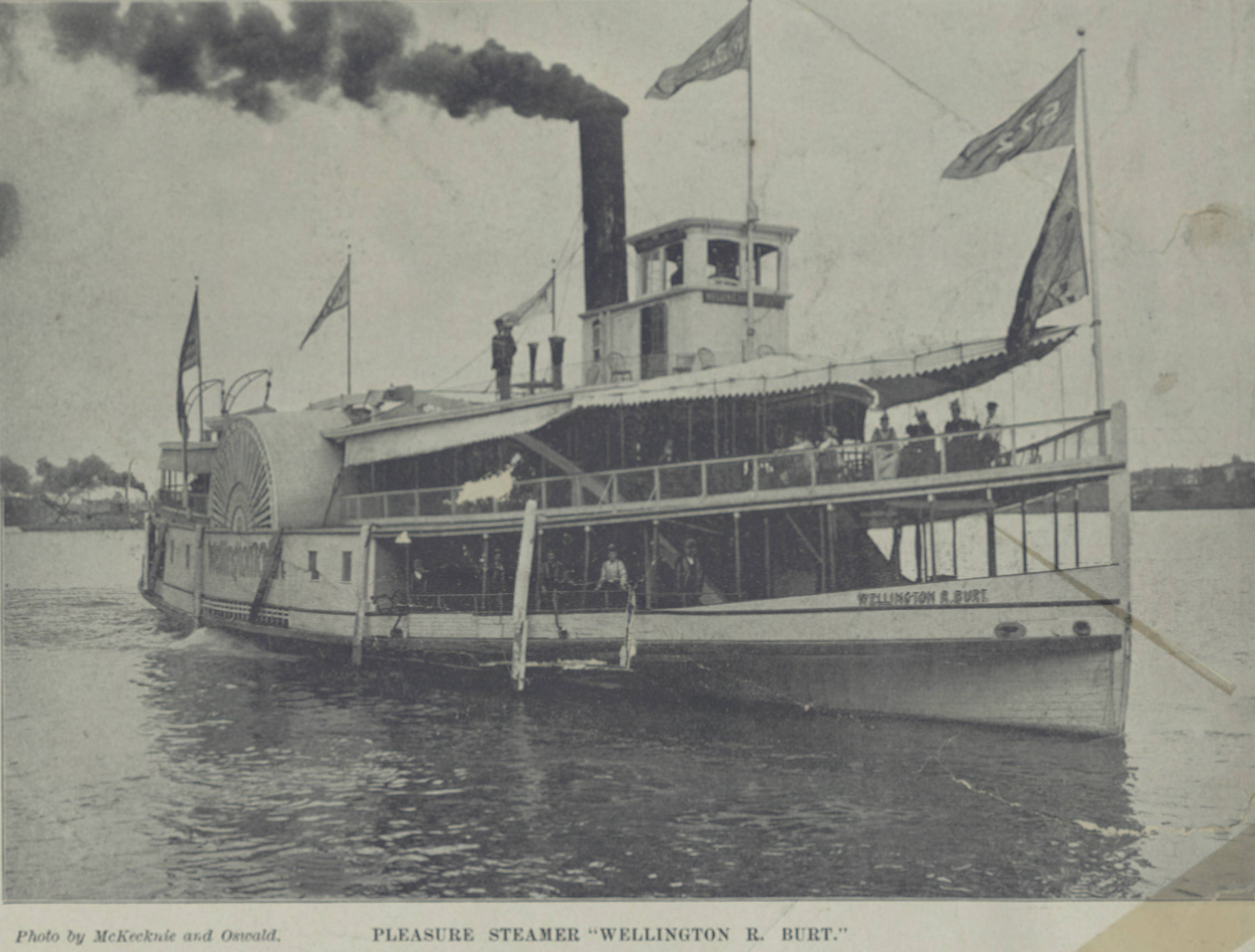
"Pleasure Steamer Wellington R. Burt" from Picturesque Maumee, 1892

== See also ==
- Charles Lathrop Pack
- Thellusson Will Case

Party political offices
Preceded by George L. Yaple	Democratic nominee for Governor of Michigan; 1888	Succeeded by Edwin B. Winans
