= Burt Township, Michigan =

Burt Township is the name of some places in the U.S. state of Michigan:

- Burt Township, Alger County, Michigan
- Burt Township, Cheboygan County, Michigan

== See also ==
- Burt, Michigan, an unincorporated community in Saginaw County
