= 1880 Michigan gubernatorial election =

- November 2, 1880
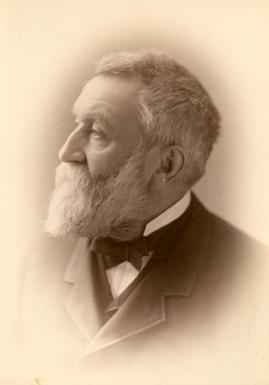

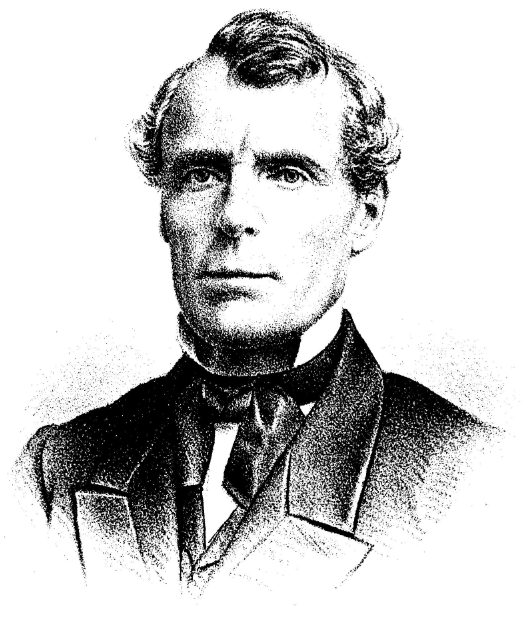

Nominee	David Jerome	Frederick M. Holloway	David Woodman
Party	Republican	Democratic	Greenback
Popular vote	178,945	137,702	35,123
Percentage	50.66%	38.99%	9.94%
- County results Jerome: 40–50% 50–60% 60–70% 70–80% Holloway: 30–40% 40–50% 50–60% 60–70% 80–90% No data/vote
Governor before election
Charles Croswell
Republican
Elected Governor
David Jerome
Republican

The 1880 Michigan gubernatorial election was held on November 2, 1880. Republican nominee David Jerome defeated Democratic nominee Frederick M. Holloway with 50.66% of the vote.

== General election ==
=== Candidates ===
Major party candidates

- Frederick M. Holloway, Democratic
- David Jerome, Republican

Other candidates

- Isaac W. McKeever, Prohibition
- Cornelius Quick, American Labor
- David Woodman, Greenback

=== Results ===
1880 Michigan gubernatorial election (Note: Imperfect votes have been assigned to their respective intended candidates. Certified totals: Jerome 178,944; Holloway 137,671; Woodman 31,085; McKeever 1,114; Quick 220; Imperfect 4,154; Scattering 12; Blank 5.)
Party	Candidate	Votes	%	±%
Republican	David Jerome	178,945	50.66%	+5.97%
Democratic	Frederick M. Holloway	137,702	38.99%	+11.21%
Greenback	David Woodman	35,123	9.94%	−16.31%
Prohibition	Isaac W. McKeever	1,198	0.34%	−0.92%
American Labor	Cornelius Quick	220	0.06%	
	Scattering	12	0.00%	
	Blank	5	0.00%	
Majority		41,243	11.68%	
Total votes		353,205	100.00%	
Republican hold		Swing	-5.23%	

==== Results by county ====
County	David Jerome Republican		Frederick M. Holloway Democratic		David Woodman Greenback		Isaac W. McKeever Prohibition		Cornelius Quick Labor		Margin		Total votes cast
County	#	%	#	%	#	%	#	%	#	%	#	%	Total votes cast
Alcona	373	57.83%	263	40.78%	9	1.40%	0	0.00%	0	0.00%	110	17.05%	645
Allegan	4,652	55.88%	2,383	28.62%	1,226	14.73%	5	0.06%	59	0.71%	2,269	27.26%	8,325
Alpena	958	52.26%	836	45.61%	39	2.13%	0	0.00%	0	0.00%	122	6.66%	1,833
Antrim	592	61.09%	156	16.10%	220	22.70%	1	0.10%	0	0.00%	372 (Note: Jerome's margin over Woodman)	38.39%	969
Baraga	165	41.35%	232	58.15%	0	0.00%	2	0.50%	0	0.00%	-67	-16.79%	399
Barry	3,056	48.76%	1,028	16.40%	2,137	34.10%	31	0.49%	15	0.24%	919	14.66%	6,267
Bay	2,367	36.72%	2,434	37.76%	1,645	25.52%	0	0.00%	0	0.00%	-67	-1.04%	6,446
Benzie	448	58.26%	178	23.15%	141	18.34%	0	0.00%	2	0.26%	270	35.11%	769
Berrien	4,438	51.51%	3,614	41.95%	545	6.33%	12	0.14%	6	0.07%	824	9.56%	8,615
Branch	4,059	58.51%	1,281	18.47%	1,582	22.81%	12	0.17%	3	0.04%	2,477	35.70%	6,937
Calhoun	5,114	55.63%	3,156	34.33%	891	9.69%	31	0.34%	1	0.01%	1,958	21.30%	9,193
Cass	2,841	52.05%	2,216	40.60%	396	7.26%	5	0.09%	0	0.00%	625	11.45%	5,458
Charlevoix	777	66.70%	287	24.64%	98	8.41%	3	0.26%	0	0.00%	490	42.06%	1,165
Cheboygan	598	47.96%	550	44.11%	99	7.94%	0	0.00%	0	0.00%	48	3.85%	1,247
Chippewa	375	50.68%	363	49.05%	2	0.27%	0	0.00%	0	0.00%	12	1.62%	740
Clare	470	51.93%	384	42.43%	51	5.64%	0	0.00%	0	0.00%	86	9.50%	905
Clinton	3,205	46.73%	2,813	41.01%	826	12.04%	11	0.16%	4	0.06%	392	5.72%	6,859
Crawford	182	52.45%	140	40.35%	25	7.20%	0	0.00%	0	0.00%	42	12.10%	347
Delta	646	56.52%	491	42.96%	6	0.52%	0	0.00%	0	0.00%	155	13.56%	1,143
Eaton	4,135	53.19%	2,662	34.24%	865	11.13%	112	1.44%	0	0.00%	1,473	18.95%	7,774
Emmet	819	57.15%	494	34.47%	118	8.23%	2	0.14%	0	0.00%	325	22.68%	1,433
Genesee	4,875	54.19%	3,119	34.67%	925	10.28%	67	0.74%	10	0.11%	1,756	19.52%	8,996
Gladwin	167	40.63%	237	57.66%	7	1.70%	0	0.00%	0	0.00%	-70	-17.03%	411
Grand Traverse	1,350	73.09%	426	23.06%	71	3.84%	0	0.00%	0	0.00%	924	50.03%	1,847
Gratiot	2,523	50.42%	1,483	29.64%	988	19.74%	7	0.14%	3	0.06%	1,040	20.78%	5,004
Hillsdale	4,755	57.90%	2,135	26.00%	1,290	15.71%	27	0.33%	5	0.06%	2,620	31.90%	8,212
Houghton	1,959	57.55%	1,437	42.22%	0	0.00%	8	0.24%	0	0.00%	522	15.33%	3,404
Huron	1,634	54.63%	1,289	43.10%	39	1.30%	29	0.97%	0	0.00%	345	11.53%	2,991
Ingham	3,919	46.49%	3,391	40.23%	1,085	12.87%	33	0.39%	1	0.01%	528	6.26%	8,429
Ionia	4,119	51.15%	2,548	31.64%	1,317	16.36%	55	0.68%	13	0.16%	1,571	19.51%	8,052
Iosco	782	58.93%	540	40.69%	5	0.38%	0	0.00%	0	0.00%	242	18.24%	1,327
Isabella	1,448	56.41%	993	38.68%	124	4.83%	2	0.08%	0	0.00%	455	17.72%	2,567
Jackson	4,329	42.31%	3,870	37.82%	1,893	18.50%	129	1.26%	11	0.11%	459	4.49%	10,232
Kalamazoo	4,357	54.07%	3,150	39.09%	548	6.80%	2	0.02%	1	0.01%	1,207	14.98%	8,058
Kalkaska	495	71.22%	170	24.46%	30	4.32%	0	0.00%	0	0.00%	325	46.76%	695
Kent	7,877	47.68%	5,625	34.05%	2,934	17.76%	68	0.41%	17	0.10%	2,252	13.63%	16,521
Keweenaw	579	67.72%	274	32.05%	0	0.00%	0	0.00%	0	0.00%	305	35.67%	855 (Note: Includes 2 scattering votes)
Lake	564	66.20%	281	32.98%	5	0.59%	2	0.23%	0	0.00%	283	33.22%	852
Lapeer	3,397	54.66%	2,629	42.30%	170	2.74%	15	0.24%	4	0.06%	768	12.36%	6,215
Leelanau	635	49.61%	563	43.98%	82	6.41%	0	0.00%	0	0.00%	72	5.63%	1,280
Lenawee	6,352	51.79%	5,325	43.42%	379	3.09%	199	1.62%	9	0.07%	1,027	8.37%	12,264
Livingston	2,851	48.00%	2,823	47.53%	238	4.01%	11	0.19%	17	0.29%	28	0.47%	5,940
Mackinac	145	32.81%	297	67.19%	0	0.00%	0	0.00%	0	0.00%	-152	-34.39%	442
Macomb	3,087	46.99%	3,266	49.71%	193	2.94%	22	0.33%	1	0.02%	-179	-2.72%	6,570 (Note: Includes 1 scattering vote)
Manistee	1,138	49.52%	917	39.90%	239	10.40%	4	0.17%	0	0.00%	221	9.62%	2,298
Manitou	34	19.65%	139	80.35%	0	0.00%	0	0.00%	0	0.00%	-105	-60.69%	173
Marquette	2,353	62.98%	1,348	36.08%	14	0.37%	21	0.56%	0	0.00%	1,005	26.90%	3,736
Mason	1,243	58.99%	791	37.54%	73	3.46%	0	0.00%	0	0.00%	452	21.45%	2,107
Mecosta	1,518	55.30%	979	35.66%	248	9.03%	0	0.00%	0	0.00%	539	19.64%	2,745
Menominee	1,270	56.10%	988	43.64%	4	0.18%	2	0.09%	0	0.00%	282	12.46%	2,264
Midland	767	50.20%	407	26.64%	346	22.64%	7	0.46%	1	0.07%	360	23.56%	1,528
Missaukee	264	62.26%	124	29.25%	36	8.49%	0	0.00%	0	0.00%	140	33.02%	424
Monroe	3,104	43.67%	3,759	52.88%	233	3.28%	2	0.03%	10	0.14%	-655	-9.21%	7,108
Montcalm	4,097	53.19%	2,869	37.25%	727	9.44%	5	0.06%	0	0.00%	1,228	15.94%	7,702 (Note: Includes 4 scattering votes)
Muskegon	2,668	55.06%	1,795	37.04%	382	7.88%	1	0.02%	0	0.00%	873	18.01%	4,846
Newaygo	1,407	42.92%	840	25.63%	1,020	31.12%	11	0.34%	0	0.00%	387	11.80%	3,278
Oakland	5,304	48.78%	5,212	47.94%	294	2.70%	56	0.52%	7	0.06%	92	0.85%	10,873
Oceana	1,401	56.93%	542	22.02%	491	19.95%	25	1.02%	2	0.08%	859	34.90%	2,461
Ogemaw	263	51.47%	189	36.99%	59	11.55%	0	0.00%	0	0.00%	74	14.48%	511
Ontonagon	217	46.07%	228	48.41%	25	5.31%	1	0.21%	0	0.00%	-11	-2.34%	471
Osceola	1,180	64.13%	614	33.37%	23	1.25%	22	1.20%	1	0.05%	566	30.76%	1,840
Otsego	324	50.86%	222	34.85%	82	12.87%	9	1.41%	0	0.00%	102	16.01%	637
Ottawa	3,196	51.55%	2,129	34.34%	867	13.98%	8	0.13%	0	0.00%	1,067	17.21%	6,200
Presque Isle	214	59.28%	147	40.72%	0	0.00%	0	0.00%	0	0.00%	67	18.56%	361
Roscommon	355	34.77%	576	56.42%	90	8.81%	0	0.00%	0	0.00%	-221	-21.65%	1,021
Saginaw	4,994	45.02%	5,506	49.63%	580	5.23%	13	0.12%	0	0.00%	-512	-4.62%	11,093
Sanilac	2,192	58.88%	1,331	35.75%	198	5.32%	2	0.05%	0	0.00%	861	23.13%	3,723
Schoolcraft	158	79.40%	41	20.60%	0	0.00%	0	0.00%	0	0.00%	117	58.79%	199
Shiawassee	3,228	49.73%	2,073	31.94%	1,160	17.87%	29	0.45%	1	0.02%	1,155	17.79%	6,491
St. Clair	4,086	48.56%	3,570	42.42%	748	8.89%	6	0.07%	0	0.00%	516	6.13%	8,415 (Note: Includes 5 blank votes)
St. Joseph	3,062	47.31%	2,014	31.12%	1,387	21.43%	1	0.02%	5	0.08%	1,048	16.19%	6,472 (Note: Includes 3 scattering votes)
Tuscola	2,974	60.86%	1,579	32.31%	325	6.65%	9	0.18%	0	0.00%	1,395	28.55%	4,887
Van Buren	3,988	55.36%	2,100	29.15%	1,092	15.16%	15	0.21%	9	0.12%	1,888	26.21%	7,204
Washtenaw	4,463	44.92%	5,135	51.69%	307	3.09%	28	0.28%	2	0.02%	-672	-6.76%	9,935
Wayne	13,943	43.68%	17,242	54.02%	715	2.24%	18	0.06%	0	0.00%	-3,299	-10.34%	31,920
Wexford	1,071	64.95%	464	28.14%	114	6.91%	0	0.00%	0	0.00%	607	36.81%	1,649
Total	178,945	50.66%	137,702	38.99%	35,123	9.94%	1,198	0.34%	220	0.06%	41,243	11.68%	353,205

===== Counties that flipped from Democratic to Republican =====
- Alcona
- Alpena
- Cheboygan
- Chippewa
- Livingston
- Manistee
- Oakland
- Ogemaw

===== Counties that flipped from Greenback to Republican =====
- Barry
- Jackson
- Kent
- Newaygo
- St. Joseph

===== Counties that flipped from Republican to Democratic =====
- Gladwin
- Washtenaw

===== Counties that flipped from Greenback to Democratic =====
- Bay
