= 1888 Michigan gubernatorial election =

- November 6, 1888
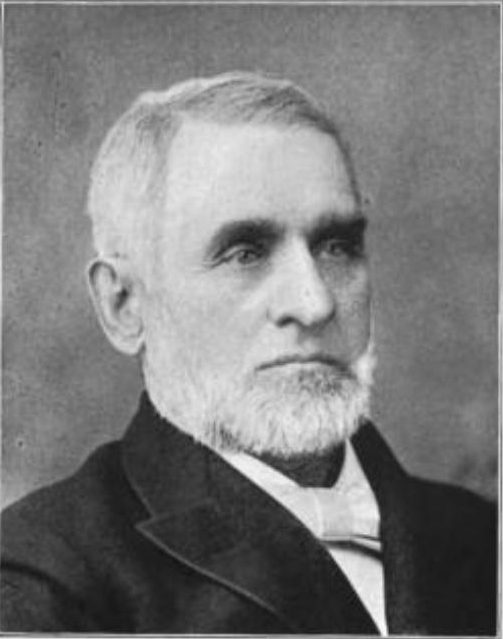

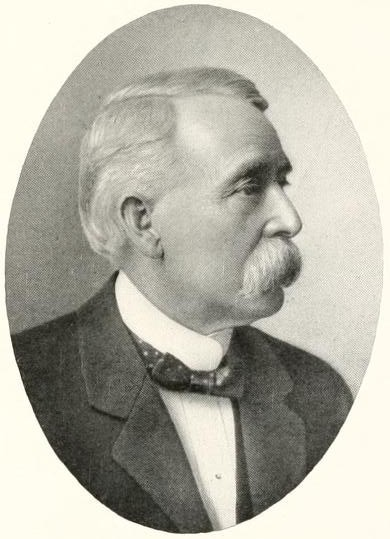
Nominee	Cyrus G. Luce	Wellington R. Burt
Party	Republican	Democratic
Alliance		Greenback
Popular vote	233,595	216,450
Percentage	49.20%	45.59%
- County results Luce: 40–50% 50–60% 60–70% Burt: 40–50% 50–60% 60–70% 90–100%
Governor before election
Cyrus G. Luce
Republican
Elected Governor
Cyrus G. Luce
Republican

The 1888 Michigan gubernatorial election was held on November 6, 1888. Republican nominee Cyrus G. Luce defeated Fusion candidate Wellington R. Burt with 49.20% of the vote.

== General election ==
=== Candidates ===
Major party candidates

- Cyrus G. Luce, Republican
- Wellington R. Burt, Democratic (Note: Burt ran on a fusion ticket, backed by both the Democrats and the Greenbackers.)

Other candidates

- Amherst B. Cheney, Prohibition
- Wildman Mills, Union Labor

=== Results ===
1888 Michigan gubernatorial election
Party	Candidate	Votes	%	±%
Republican	Cyrus G. Luce (inc.)	233,595	49.20%	+1.55%
Fusion	Wellington R. Burt	216,450	45.59%	−0.11%
Prohibition	Amherst B. Cheney	20,342	4.28%	−2.36%
Union Labor	Wildman Mills	4,388	0.92%	
	Scattering	17	0.00%	
Plurality		17,145	3.61%	
Total votes		474,792	100.00%	
Republican hold		Swing	+1.66%	

==== Results by county ====
After this election, Oscoda County would not vote Democratic again until 1978.

County	Cyrus G. Luce Republican		Wellington R. Burt Fusion		Amherst B. Cheney Prohibition		Wildman Mills Union Labor		Margin		Total votes cast
County	#	%	#	%	#	%	#	%	#	%	Total votes cast
Alcona	650	56.03%	498	42.93%	6	0.52%	6	0.52%	152	13.10%	1,160
Alger	269	58.99%	177	38.82%	10	2.19%	0	0.00%	92	20.18%	456
Allegan	5,084	52.06%	3,833	39.25%	722	7.39%	126	1.29%	1,251	12.81%	9,765
Alpena	1,497	47.51%	1,500	47.60%	111	3.52%	43	1.36%	-3	-0.10%	3,151
Antrim	1,310	56.93%	879	38.20%	112	4.87%	0	0.00%	431	18.73%	2,301
Arenac	350	31.25%	272	24.29%	40	3.57%	458	40.89%	-108 (Note: Cheney's margin over Luce)	-9.64%	1,120
Baraga	384	48.00%	412	51.50%	4	0.50%	0	0.00%	-28	-3.50%	800
Barry	3,246	50.34%	2,679	41.55%	370	5.74%	153	2.37%	567	8.79%	6,448
Bay	4,364	43.57%	5,422	54.13%	114	1.14%	116	1.16%	-1,058	-10.56%	10,016
Benzie	720	58.44%	406	32.95%	90	7.31%	16	1.30%	314	25.49%	1,232
Berrien	5,100	49.43%	4,725	45.80%	462	4.48%	29	0.28%	375	3.63%	10,317 (Note: Includes 1 Scattering vote)
Branch	4,070	55.34%	2,787	37.89%	451	6.13%	47	0.64%	1,283	17.44%	7,355
Calhoun	5,770	53.13%	4,372	40.26%	568	5.23%	150	1.38%	1,398	12.87%	10,860
Cass	2,927	50.58%	2,572	44.44%	279	4.82%	9	0.16%	355	6.13%	5,787
Charlevoix	1,285	57.31%	862	38.45%	94	4.19%	1	0.04%	423	18.87%	2,242
Cheboygan	1,100	45.30%	1,245	51.28%	76	3.13%	7	0.29%	-145	-5.97%	2,428
Chippewa	1,062	51.96%	903	44.18%	79	3.86%	0	0.00%	159	7.78%	2,044
Clare	915	48.80%	906	48.32%	44	2.35%	10	0.53%	9	0.48%	1,875
Clinton	3,507	48.86%	3,246	45.23%	336	4.68%	88	1.23%	261	3.64%	7,177
Crawford	437	47.29%	478	51.73%	8	0.87%	1	0.11%	-41	-4.44%	924
Delta	1,582	54.03%	1,335	45.59%	11	0.38%	0	0.00%	247	8.44%	2,928
Eaton	4,649	52.44%	3,279	36.98%	588	6.63%	350	3.95%	1,370	15.45%	8,866
Emmet	961	45.65%	1,042	49.50%	102	4.85%	0	0.00%	-81	-3.85%	2,105
Genesee	5,408	53.24%	3,913	38.52%	817	8.04%	20	0.20%	1,495	14.72%	10,158
Gladwin	515	57.67%	367	41.10%	9	1.01%	2	0.22%	148	16.57%	893
Gogebic	1,361	54.16%	1,116	44.41%	36	1.43%	0	0.00%	245	9.75%	2,513
Grand Traverse	1,856	63.06%	926	31.46%	154	5.23%	7	0.24%	930	31.60%	2,943
Gratiot	3,710	52.89%	2,854	40.69%	389	5.55%	61	0.87%	856	12.20%	7,014
Hillsdale	4,952	56.81%	3,068	35.20%	562	6.45%	135	1.55%	1,884	21.61%	8,717
Houghton	2,961	50.33%	2,741	46.59%	181	3.08%	0	0.00%	220	3.74%	5,883
Huron	1,666	35.74%	1,935	41.51%	191	4.10%	867	18.60%	-269	-5.77%	4,661 (Note: Includes 2 Scattering votes)
Ingham	4,591	46.09%	4,767	47.85%	496	4.98%	108	1.08%	-176	-1.77%	9,962
Ionia	4,447	51.11%	3,780	43.45%	467	5.37%	6	0.07%	667	7.67%	8,700
Iosco	1,501	45.37%	1,642	49.64%	114	3.45%	51	1.54%	-141	-4.26%	3,308
Iron	605	53.45%	524	46.29%	2	0.18%	1	0.09%	81	7.16%	1,132
Isabella	2,156	51.44%	1,846	44.05%	173	4.13%	16	0.38%	310	7.40%	4,191
Jackson	5,650	48.88%	5,241	45.34%	525	4.54%	144	1.25%	409	3.54%	11,560
Kalamazoo	5,408	54.40%	3,981	40.04%	520	5.23%	33	0.33%	1,427	14.35%	9,942
Kalkaska	790	61.62%	407	31.75%	79	6.16%	0	0.00%	383	29.88%	1,282 (Note: Includes 6 Scattering votes)
Kent	12,798	49.41%	11,816	45.62%	1,283	4.95%	1	0.00%	982	3.79%	25,900
Keweenaw	414	69.00%	182	30.33%	4	0.67%	0	0.00%	232	38.67%	600
Lake	1,046	53.45%	822	42.00%	87	4.45%	2	0.10%	224	11.45%	1,957
Lapeer	3,693	53.79%	2,904	42.30%	246	3.58%	22	0.32%	789	11.49%	6,865
Leelanau	898	55.67%	666	41.29%	49	3.04%	0	0.00%	232	14.38%	1,613
Lenawee	6,448	49.34%	5,688	43.52%	910	6.96%	22	0.17%	760	5.82%	13,069
Livingston	2,697	44.83%	2,857	47.49%	343	5.70%	119	1.98%	-160	-2.66%	6,016
Luce	213	53.79%	171	43.18%	12	3.03%	0	0.00%	42	10.61%	396
Mackinac	627	40.69%	901	58.47%	13	0.84%	0	0.00%	-274	-17.78%	1,541
Macomb	3,202	44.73%	3,739	52.24%	214	2.99%	3	0.04%	-537	-7.50%	7,158
Manistee	1,675	39.64%	2,308	54.61%	200	4.73%	43	1.02%	-633	-14.98%	4,226
Manitou	3	2.44%	120	97.56%	0	0.00%	0	0.00%	-117	-95.12%	123
Marquette	4,398	64.24%	2,204	32.19%	244	3.56%	0	0.00%	2,194	32.05%	6,846
Mason	1,706	51.05%	1,575	47.13%	58	1.74%	0	0.00%	131	3.92%	3,342 (Note: Includes 3 Scattering votes)
Mecosta	2,631	55.55%	1,777	37.52%	321	6.78%	7	0.15%	854	18.03%	4,736
Menominee	3,151	57.01%	2,235	40.44%	93	1.68%	48	0.87%	916	16.57%	5,527
Midland	1,270	48.55%	1,153	44.07%	117	4.47%	76	2.91%	117	4.47%	2,616
Missaukee	636	50.60%	573	45.58%	46	3.66%	2	0.16%	63	5.01%	1,257
Monroe	3,382	44.74%	3,976	52.59%	187	2.47%	15	0.20%	-594	-7.86%	7,560
Montcalm	4,491	53.53%	3,491	41.61%	363	4.33%	45	0.54%	1,000	11.92%	8,390
Montmorency	235	48.65%	246	50.93%	2	0.41%	0	0.00%	-11	-2.28%	483
Muskegon	4,517	52.46%	3,486	40.49%	405	4.70%	202	2.35%	1,031	11.97%	8,610
Newaygo	2,470	52.12%	1,949	41.13%	238	5.02%	82	1.73%	521	10.99%	4,739
Oakland	5,436	47.70%	5,405	47.42%	554	4.86%	2	0.02%	31	0.27%	11,397
Oceana	1,718	47.63%	1,421	39.40%	443	12.28%	25	0.69%	297	8.23%	3,607
Ogemaw	620	48.44%	584	45.63%	27	2.11%	49	3.83%	36	2.81%	1,280
Ontonagon	309	36.23%	541	63.42%	3	0.35%	0	0.00%	-232	-27.20%	853
Osceola	1,911	57.84%	1,083	32.78%	301	9.11%	9	0.27%	828	25.06%	3,304
Oscoda	279	47.77%	295	50.51%	10	1.71%	0	0.00%	-16	-2.74%	584
Otsego	579	53.36%	434	40.00%	58	5.35%	14	1.29%	145	13.36%	1,085
Ottawa	4,314	55.19%	3,180	40.69%	258	3.30%	63	0.81%	1,134	14.51%	7,816
Presque Isle	379	42.02%	513	56.87%	10	1.11%	0	0.00%	-134	-14.86%	902
Roscommon	385	53.40%	334	46.32%	1	0.14%	1	0.14%	51	7.07%	721
Saginaw	6,544	40.90%	9,103	56.89%	298	1.86%	55	0.34%	-2,559	-15.99%	16,000
Sanilac	2,950	51.81%	2,447	42.98%	228	4.00%	69	1.21%	503	8.83%	5,694
Schoolcraft	601	48.66%	580	46.96%	54	4.37%	0	0.00%	21	1.70%	1,235
Shiawassee	4,011	51.98%	3,200	41.47%	494	6.40%	12	0.16%	811	10.51%	7,717
St. Clair	5,422	49.08%	5,297	47.95%	308	2.79%	20	0.18%	125	1.13%	11,047
St. Joseph	3,383	48.56%	3,211	46.09%	171	2.45%	202	2.90%	172	2.47%	6,967
Tuscola	3,876	52.73%	3,126	42.52%	278	3.78%	70	0.95%	750	10.20%	7,351
Van Buren	4,812	58.40%	2,980	36.17%	440	5.34%	8	0.10%	1,832	22.23%	8,240
Washtenaw	4,556	43.05%	5,478	51.77%	533	5.04%	15	0.14%	-922	-8.71%	10,582
Wayne	18,653	38.89%	28,404	59.21%	889	1.85%	23	0.05%	-9,751	-20.33%	47,969
Wexford	1,440	54.24%	1,057	39.81%	157	5.91%	1	0.04%	383	14.43%	2,655
Total	233,595	49.20%	216,540	45.59%	20,342	4.28%	4,388	0.92%	17,145	3.61%	474,792

===== Counties that flipped from Democratic to Republican =====
- Chippewa
- Clare
- Ionia
- Kent
- Menominee
- Midland
- Missaukee
- Oakland
- Otsego
- Roscommon
- St. Clair
- St. Joseph

===== Counties that flipped from Republican to Democratic =====
- Crawford
- Ontonagon
- Presque Isle

===== Counties that flipped from Democratic to Union Labor =====
- Arenac
