= Cyrus G. Luce =

American politician

Cyrus Luce
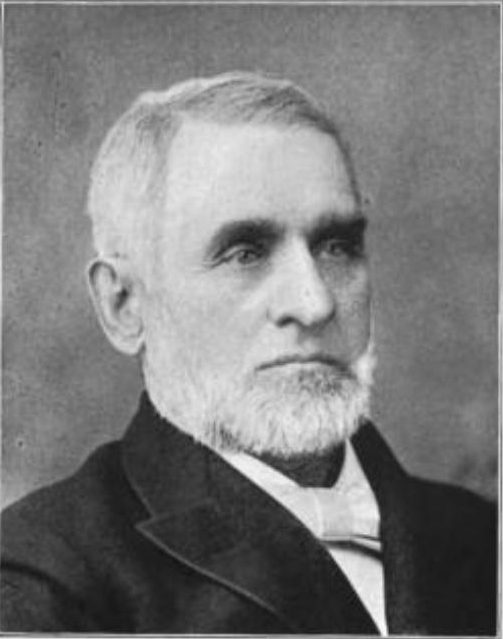

21st Governor of Michigan
- In office January 1, 1887 – January 1, 1891
- Lieutenant: James H. MacDonald; William Ball
- Preceded by: Russell A. Alger
- Succeeded by: Edwin B. Winans

Member of the Michigan Senate
- In office 1865–1868
- Preceded by: Darius Monroe
- Succeeded by: John H. Jones
- Constituency: 15th district (1865–1866); 13th district (1867–1868)

Member of the Michigan House of Representatives from the Branch County 2nd district
- In office 1855–1856
- Preceded by: Henry Davis
- Succeeded by: Edwin Perry

Personal details
- Born: July 2, 1824 Windsor, Ohio, U.S.
- Died: March 18, 1905 (aged 80) Coldwater, Michigan, U.S.
- Resting place: Oak Grove Cemetery; Coldwater, Michigan, U.S.
- Party: Whig Party; Republican Party
- Spouse(s): Julia A. Dickinson; Mary Thompson
- Profession: Politician

Cyrus Gray Luce (July 2, 1824 – March 18, 1905) was an American politician who served as the 21st governor of Michigan.

== Early life in Ohio and Indiana ==
Luce was born in Windsor, Ashtabula County, Ohio, to Walter and Mary Gray Luce. Walter Luce, a veteran of the War of 1812 from Tolland, Connecticut, settled in the Connecticut Western Reserve after the war. He and Mary were parents to sons Cyrus Gray, Charles Leverett, and George Lester Luce. When he was twelve years old, young Cyrus moved west with his family to Steuben County, Indiana. After leaving school at seventeen, Cyrus Luce worked from 1841 until 1848 in a woolen mill, carding wool and dressing the unfinished cloth for sale.

== Life and politics in Michigan ==
In 1848, Luce was a Whig Party candidate for the Indiana House of Representatives for the district including Steuben and DeKalb counties. He lost a close election, and in the same year he purchased 80 acres (320,000 m^{2}) of uncultivated land near Gilead, Michigan, in Branch County, not far from the Indiana state line.

Luce cleared the land for farming and in 1849 married Julia A. Dickinson of Gilead. Over time he expanded his landholdings with additional purchases. He became an active member of the Grange in 1874, and remained active in the organization for many years afterwards.

In 1852, he was elected to represent Gilead Township on the Branch County Board of Supervisors. In 1854, he was elected as a candidate of the newly formed Republican Party to the Michigan State House of Representatives to represent Branch County's second district, serving from 1855 to 1856. He was elected Branch County Treasurer in 1858 and again in 1860. In 1864, he was named to fill a seat which represented the 15 district in the Michigan Senate and was re-elected to the 13th district seat in 1866. He served as a delegate to the 1867 Michigan state constitutional convention. In July, 1879, Luce was appointed State Oil Inspector by Governor Charles Croswell, and re-appointed by Gov. David Jerome in 1881.

His first wife Julia died in August 1882, and Luce married Mary Thompson of Bronson, Michigan, in November 1883.

Running as a Republican candidate, Luce was elected Governor of Michigan in November 1886, defeating George L. Yaple, taking office on January 1, 1887. He was reelected in 1888 and served two two-year terms. During his tenure, a local liquor option law was sanctioned and a state game warden was established, reportedly the first salaried state game wardenship in the United States. To fill this position Luce appointed William Alden Smith, who would later represent Michigan in the U.S. Senate.

== Death and legacy ==
Luce died at the age of 80 in Coldwater, Michigan, and is interred in Oak Grove Cemetery adjacent to that municipality.

Luce County, in the Upper Peninsula, is named in his honor. He was the last governor of the state to have a county named in his honor. His administration was marked by rapid population growth and development in northern Michigan, led by the lumber industry. A state landmark, the Grand Hotel on Mackinac Island, was built in 1887 during his administration.

Party political offices
| Preceded by Russell A. Alger | Republican nominee for Governor of Michigan; 1886, 1888 | Succeeded by James M. Turner |
Political offices
| Preceded by Russell A. Alger | Governor of Michigan; 1887–1891 | Succeeded by Edwin B. Winans |
