= David Preston (banker) =

American banker (1826–1887)

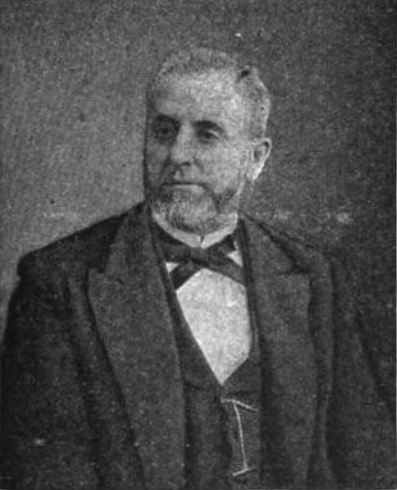
- Born: September 20, 1826; Harmony, New York, U.S.
- Died: April 24, 1887 (aged 60); Detroit, Michigan, U.S.
- Political party: Prohibition
- Other political affiliations: Republican
- Spouse: Jane B. Hawk (m. 1852)

David Preston (September 20, 1826 – April 24, 1887) was an American banker, philanthropist, and politician. He moved to Detroit from New York state in 1848. He established a banking office in 1852. He raised funds for Methodist projects around Michigan. Initially a Republican, he became affiliated with the Prohibition Party later in life, and was nominated for governor by the party in 1884.

== Early life ==
David Preston was born on September 20, 1826, in Harmony, New York. He was a member of the Methodist Episcopal Church from a young age. His father was Rev. David Preston, himself a member of the Methodist Episcopal Church, and his mother was Affa Preston. He was the second youngest of ten siblings. Preston received a common school education in New York, and then worked as a teacher for four years in Chautauqua County. He moved to Detroit, Michigan in 1848, arriving on November 4.

== Career ==
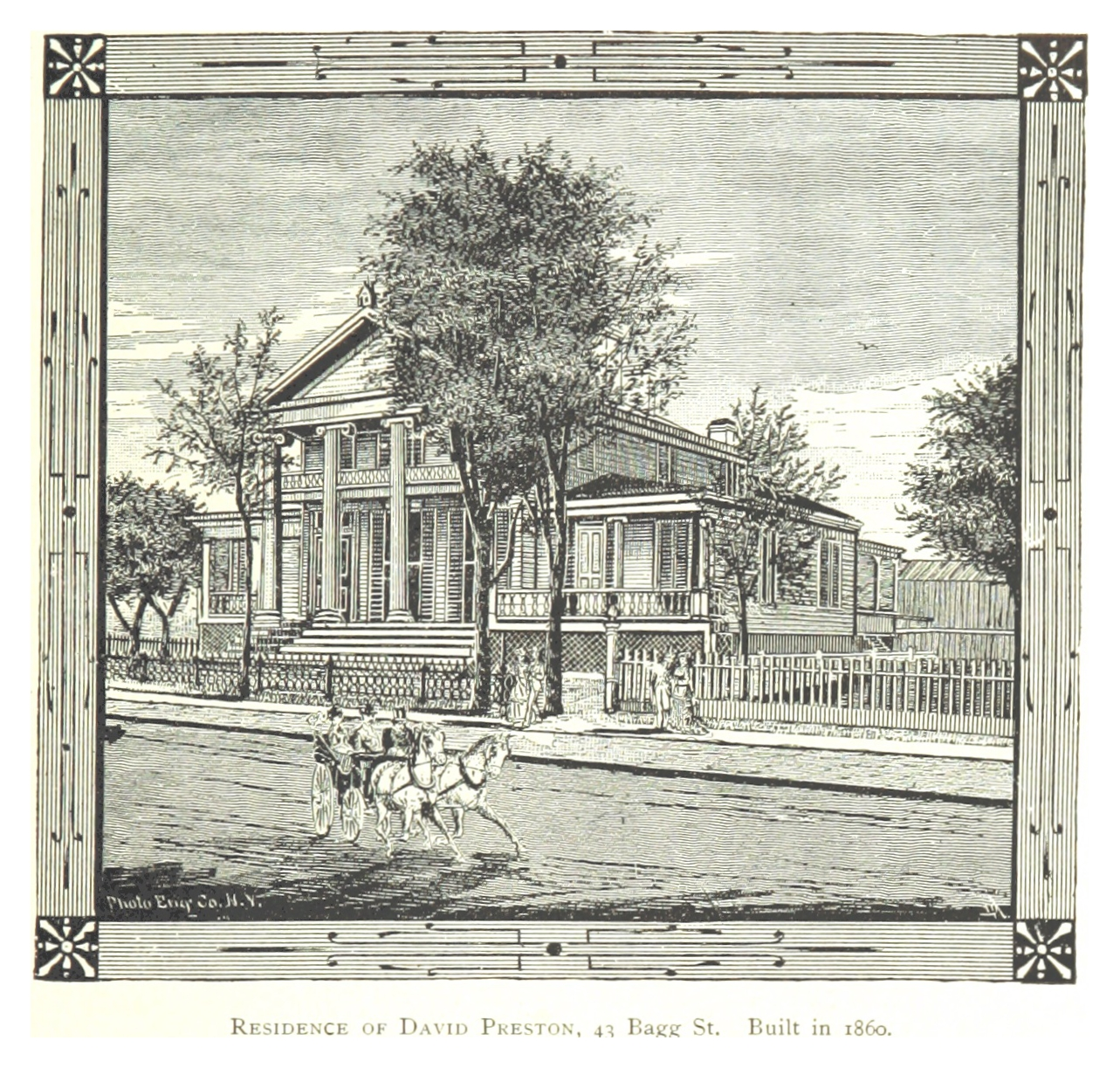
Preston's residence

=== Banking ===
After moving to Detroit, Preston worked in the banking office of G. F. Lewis. He worked there for four years. In May 1852, Preston established his own banking office under the name David Preston & Company. The bank was successful.

In 1860, S. A. Kean established a bank in Chicago, soon partnering with J. F. Willard. Preston soon after partnered with them, the business being known as Preston, Willard & Kean. By 1872, the firm was known as Preston, Kean & Co. This bank was also successful.

On March 22, 1883, the Detroit Clearing House Association was formed. David Preston & Company was one of the first fourteen banking houses in associated with the organization, and Preston served on the first standing committee. In June 1885, David Preston & Company was incorporated as the Preston Bank of Detroit. Preston would serve as president of the corporation until his death.

=== Politics and other endeavors ===
In December 1856, Preston established a semi-monthly periodical known as Preston's United States Bank Note Reporter. Around 1861, Preston's periodic became monthly, and by December 1865, the periodical was suspended. Preston, during the American Civil War, Preston was involved with the United States Christian Commission. Preston served as president of the Young Men's Christian Association of Detroit from 1869 to 1870.

Preston was a Republican for most of his life. The only local office Preston held was alderman for Detroit's 5th ward, from 1872 to 1873. He served on the ways and means committee of the council. Later in Preston's life, he became associated with the Prohibition Party. Preston was nominated for governor of Michigan in the 1884 election. In 1887, Preston was nominated by the Prohibition Party for the board of regents of the University of Michigan.

== Philanthropy ==
Preston was heavily involved with charity toward Methodist institutions in Michigan. In May 1864, Preston was appointed to the building committee for the Central Methodist Episcopal Church in Detroit. He would do the bulk of the work soliciting funds for the church and the chapel. The church was completed by November 1867. In 1870, Preston offered a deal to the board of trustees of Albion College, in which he would provide a donation of $60,000 if the trustees could get raise $50,000. After the trustees raised their funds, Preston provided for his after successfully raising it by September 1873. In May 1881, Preston bought the Detroit land on which was built the Cass Avenue Methodist Episcopal Church. Sufficient funds were raised for the church in May 1883.

Preston was also involved with the establishment of the Simpson Methodist Episcopal Church in Detroit.

== Personal life ==
Preston married Jane B. Hawk of Conneaut, Ohio on May 5, 1852. Together they had several children, some which died as infants. Seven of their children survived.

== Death and legacy ==
Preston's health had been declining for the months preceding his death. By this time, he had diabetes. In 1886, he traveled to Europe in hopes to regain his health. On April 24, 1887, Preston died suddenly in his house of heart disease.

In 1894, a school was built in Detroit named after Preston. The David Preston School opened in 1895. The school closed between the 1970s and 1980s due to low enrollment. The building was demolished in October 1998.

Party political offices
| Preceded by Daniel P. Sagendorph | Prohibition nominee for Governor of Michigan; 1884 | Succeeded by Samuel Dickie |
