= Moreau S. Crosby =

American politician (1839–1893)

22nd Lieutenant Governor of Michigan
- In office January 1, 1881 – January 1, 1885
- Governor: David Jerome; Josiah Begole
- Preceded by: Alonzo Sessions
- Succeeded by: Archibald Buttars

Member of the Michigan Senate from the 28th district
- In office 1873–1874
- Preceded by: John C. Dexter
- Succeeded by: Lyman Murray

Personal details
- Born: December 2, 1839 Manchester, New York
- Died: September 12, 1893 (aged 53) Boston, Massachusetts
- Party: Republican

Moreau S. Crosby (December 2, 1839 – September 12, 1893) was an American politician who served in the Michigan Senate from 1873 to 1874 and as the 22nd lieutenant governor of Michigan from 1881 to 1885. he died at age 53 in Boston.
