= Amherst B. Cheney =

American politician (1841–1927)

Member of the Michigan House of Representatives from the Kent County 3rd district
- In office 1877–1880
- Preceded by: Edward L. Briggs
- Succeeded by: Heman Palmerlee

Personal details
- Born: October 27, 1841 Ripley, Ohio, U.S.
- Died: January 9, 1927 (aged 85) Sparta, Michigan, U.S.
- Party: Prohibition
- Other political affiliations: Republican (before 1884)
- Spouse: Emmogene Hinman (m. 1869)

Military service
- Branch/service: U.S. Army (Union Army)
- Years of service: 1862–1865
- Unit: 21st Michigan Infantry Regiment
- Battles/wars: American Civil War

Amherst B. Cheney (October 27, 1841 – January 9, 1927) was an American politician.

== Early life and military career ==
Amherst B. Cheney was born on October 27, 1841, in Ripley, Ohio to parents Abner J. and Sarah Cheney. His father was born in Vermont before serving as a minister in Ohio, and his mother was from New York. He moved with his father to a farm in Homer, Michigan in 1845. Cheney received a common school education. He moved to Sparta, Michigan in 1858.

On September 4, 1862, Cheney voluntarily enlisted in the 21st Michigan Infantry Regiment as quartermaster sergeant. He was promoted to second lieutenant in 1864. On March 19, 1865, he was severely wounded in Bentonville, North Carolina while commanding Company B. He returned to duty after his recovery. He was mustered out on June 8, 1865.

== Career ==
After the Civil War, Cheney was engaged in a number of businesses, including insurance and real estate. By 1869, Cheney was working as a beekeeper. By 1876, Cheney had served in the local political offices of justice of the peace and town treasurer. In 1876, Cheney was elected to the Michigan House of Representatives seat representing the Kent County 3rd district, on the Republican ticket. He was re-elected in 1878.

As a Republican, Cheney was a strong advocate of the prohibition of alcohol. In 1884, Cheney became a member of the Prohibition Party. The same year, Cheney was nominated by the Prohibitionists for Michigan State Treasurer. In 1886, Cheney ran for the Michigan Senate seat representing the 20th district. He was nominated for the board of regents of the University of Michigan in 1887. In 1888, was nominated by the Prohibitionists for governor.

In 1894, Cheney, as a private banker, was sued by multiple people for embezzlement. In March 1894, Cheney confessed in probate court to double selling a mortgage to a mentally disabled widow whom he was guardian over.

Cheney again ran for the state senate, the 17th district, in 1910. He ran for Michigan's 5th district in the United States House of Representatives in 1912 and 1916.

== Personal life ==
Cheney married Emmogene Hinman on December 2, 1869, in Sparta. In 1899, Cheney was suspended from the Freemasons for non-payment of dues.

== Death ==
After three years of illness, Cheney died on January 9, 1927, in his Sparta home. He was buried in Greenwood Cemetery in Sparta on January 12.

Party political offices
Preceded by Samuel Dickie	Prohibition nominee for Governor of Michigan; 1888	Succeeded by Azariah S. Partridge
