= 1884 Michigan gubernatorial election =

- November 4, 1884
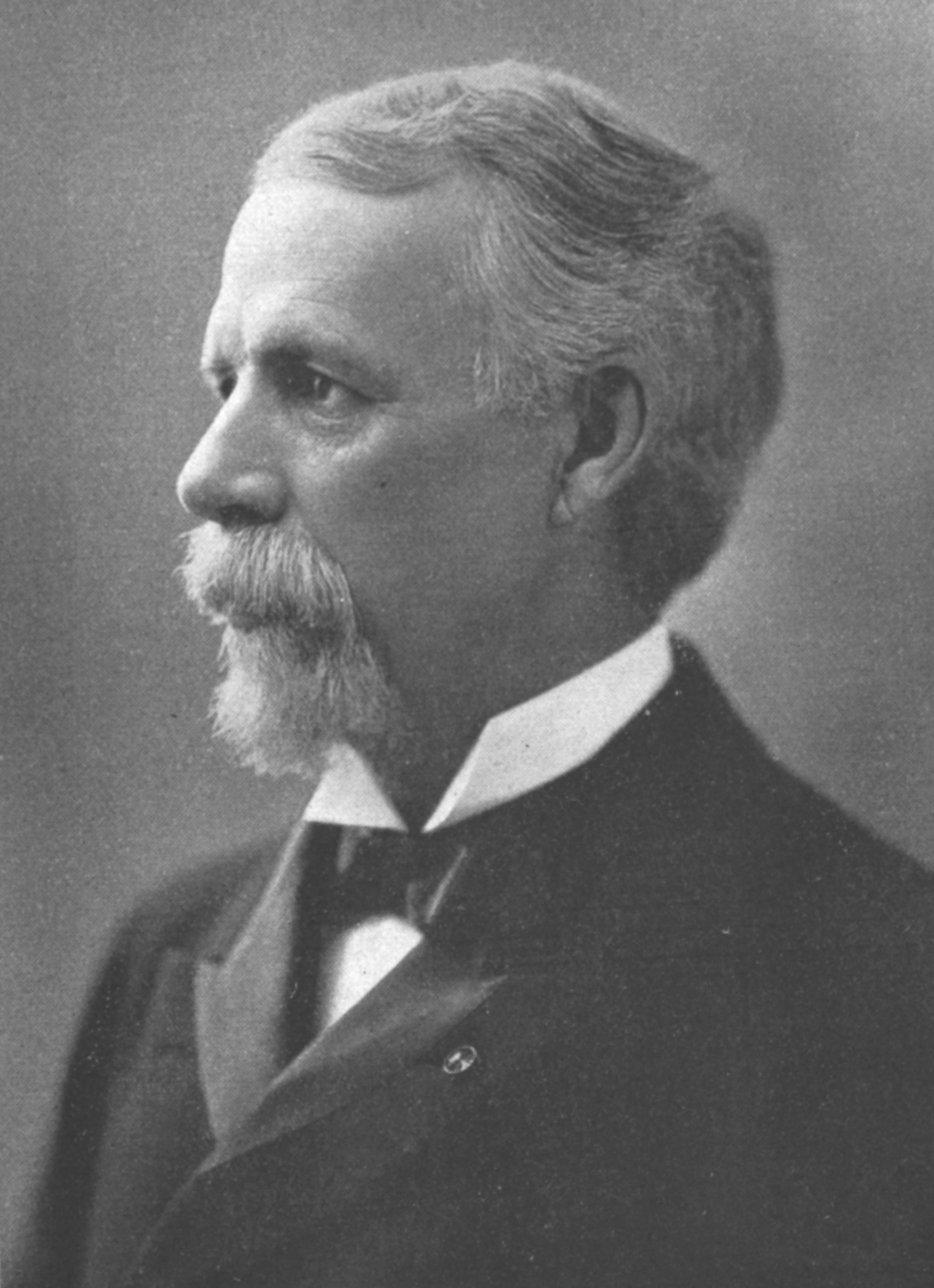

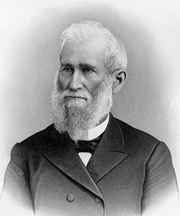

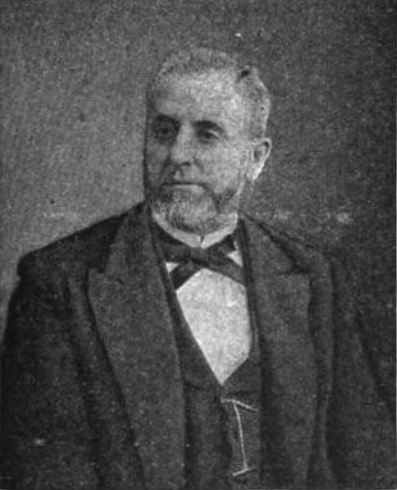
Nominee	Russell A. Alger	Josiah W. Begole	David Preston
Party	Republican	Democratic	Prohibition
Alliance		Greenback
Popular vote	190,840	186,887	22,207
Percentage	47.66%	46.67%	5.55%
- County results Alger: 40–50% 50–60% 60–70% 70–80% Begole: 40–50% 50–60% 60–70% 80–90%
Governor before election
Josiah W. Begole
Democratic
Elected Governor
Russell A. Alger
Republican

The 1884 Michigan gubernatorial election was a state election held on November 4, 1884. Republican nominee Russell A. Alger defeated incumbent Josiah W. Begole, who ran on a fusion ticket, representing both the Democratic and Greenback parties, with 47.67% of the vote.

== General election ==
=== Candidates ===
Major party candidates

- Russell A. Alger, Republican
- Josiah W. Begole, Democratic, Greenback

Other candidates

- David Preston, Prohibition
- Jesse M. Mille, Greenback

=== Results ===
1884 Michigan gubernatorial election
Party	Candidate	Votes	%	±%
Republican	Russell A. Alger	190,840	47.67%	−0.09%
Fusion	Josiah W. Begole (inc.)	186,887	46.68%	−2.60%
Prohibition	David Preston	22,207 (Note: This stated total is likely a mistake. The county results add up to 22,307 and the county totals listed on the statewide canvass all match up. Moreover, the individual county returns all give the same results.)	5.55%	+3.39%
Greenback	Jesse M. Mille	364	0.09%	−0.55%
	Scattering	41	0.01%	
	Blank	9	0.00%	
Plurality		3,953	0.99%	
Total votes		400,348	100.00%	
Republican gain from Democratic				

==== Results by county ====
The following counties voted Democratic for the first time ever: Clare, Huron, and Montmorency. Meanwhile, Baraga County, Roscommon County voted Republican for the first time. After this election, Cass County would not vote Democratic again until 1906, Barry County not again until 1908, and Newaygo County not again until 1912.

County	Russell A. Alger Republican		Josiah W. Begole Fusion		David Preston Prohibition		Jesse M. Mille Greenback		Margin		Total votes cast
County	#	%	#	%	#	%	#	%	#	%	Total votes cast
Alcona	617	69.80%	266	30.09%	1	0.11%	0	0.00%	351	39.71%	884
Allegan	4,053	47.99%	3,387	40.10%	1,004	11.89%	0	0.00%	666	7.89%	8,446 (Note: Includes 2 Scattering votes)
Alpena	1,077	50.12%	1,016	47.28%	56	2.61%	0	0.00%	61	2.84%	2,149
Antrim	1,046	57.38%	726	39.82%	51	2.80%	0	0.00%	320	17.55%	1,823
Arenac	314	32.81%	586	61.23%	56	5.85%	0	0.00%	-272	-28.42%	957 (Note: Includes 1 Scattering vote)
Baraga	401	57.45%	297	42.55%	0	0.00%	0	0.00%	104	14.90%	698
Barry	2,672	44.27%	2,944	48.77%	420	6.96%	0	0.00%	-272	-4.51%	6,036
Bay	2,930	36.61%	4,683	58.51%	207	2.59%	184	2.30%	-1,573	-21.90%	8,004
Benzie	553	54.86%	374	37.10%	81	8.04%	0	0.00%	179	17.76%	1,008
Berrien	4,410	47.77%	4,450	48.21%	370	4.01%	0	0.00%	-40	-0.43%	9,231
Branch	3,493	49.70%	3,009	42.81%	525	7.47%	0	0.00%	484	6.89%	7,028
Calhoun	4,979	49.86%	4,315	43.21%	690	6.91%	0	0.00%	664	6.65%	9,986
Cass	2,727	47.68%	2,761	48.28%	230	4.02%	1	0.02%	-34	-0.59%	5,719
Charlevoix	1,072	53.10%	879	43.54%	67	3.32%	1	0.05%	193	9.56%	2,019
Cheboygan	776	45.06%	902	52.38%	44	2.56%	0	0.00%	-126	-7.32%	1,722
Chippewa	678	50.45%	638	47.47%	28	2.08%	0	0.00%	40	2.98%	1,344
Clare	614	45.75%	684	50.97%	44	3.28%	0	0.00%	-70	-5.22%	1,342
Clinton	2,616	42.05%	3,202	51.47%	403	6.48%	0	0.00%	-586	-9.42%	6,221
Crawford	309	57.54%	219	40.78%	9	1.68%	0	0.00%	90	16.76%	537
Delta	1,198	65.75%	618	33.92%	6	0.33%	0	0.00%	580	31.83%	1,822
Eaton	4,103	49.31%	3,673	44.14%	543	6.53%	1	0.01%	430	5.17%	8,321
Emmet	767	43.02%	892	50.03%	124	6.95%	0	0.00%	-125	-7.01%	1,783
Genesee	4,117	45.85%	3,760	41.87%	1,103	12.28%	0	0.00%	357	3.98%	8,980
Gladwin	286	55.53%	194	37.67%	0	0.00%	35	6.80%	92	17.86%	515
Grand Traverse	1,569	61.89%	838	33.06%	128	5.05%	0	0.00%	731	28.84%	2,535
Gratiot	2,678	47.01%	2,707	47.52%	312	5.48%	0	0.00%	-29	-0.51%	5,697
Hillsdale	4,260	52.08%	3,166	38.70%	750	9.17%	1	0.01%	1,094	13.37%	8,180 (Note: Includes 3 Scattering votes)
Houghton	2,381	57.89%	1,660	40.36%	72	1.75%	0	0.00%	721	17.53%	4,113
Huron	1,347	39.28%	1,884	54.94%	197	5.75%	0	0.00%	-537	-15.66%	3,429
Ingham	3,694	42.45%	4,362	50.13%	636	7.31%	9	0.10%	-668	-7.68%	8,701
Ionia	3,494	44.54%	3,715	47.36%	634	8.08%	0	0.00%	-221	-2.82%	7,844
Iosco	1,071	55.87%	807	42.10%	39	2.03%	0	0.00%	264	13.77%	1,917
Isabella	1,605	48.49%	1,604	48.46%	99	2.99%	2	0.06%	1	0.03%	3,310
Jackson	4,784	43.96%	5,326	48.94%	760	6.98%	12	0.11%	-542	-4.98%	10,882
Kalamazoo	4,421	50.83%	3,784	43.51%	491	5.65%	0	0.00%	637	7.32%	8,697
Kalkaska	619	59.81%	371	35.85%	45	4.35%	0	0.00%	248	23.96%	1,035
Kent	8,843	44.89%	9,684	49.16%	1,166	5.92%	2	0.01%	-841	-4.27%	19,700 (Note: Includes 5 Scattering votes)
Keweenaw	622	74.40%	202	24.16%	12	1.44%	0	0.00%	420	50.24%	836
Lake	932	54.31%	671	39.10%	113	6.59%	0	0.00%	261	15.21%	1,716
Lapeer	3,000	49.33%	2,722	44.76%	360	5.92%	0	0.00%	278	4.57%	6,082
Leelanau	804	57.26%	576	41.03%	24	1.71%	0	0.00%	228	16.24%	1,404
Lenawee	5,690	45.44%	5,423	43.31%	1,406	11.23%	0	0.00%	267	2.13%	12,522
Livingston	2,705	46.14%	2,852	48.65%	305	5.20%	0	0.00%	-147	-2.51%	5,862
Mackinac	480	46.20%	557	53.61%	2	0.19%	0	0.00%	-77	-7.41%	1,039
Macomb	2,772	42.87%	3,438	53.17%	254	3.93%	1	0.02%	-666	-10.30%	6,466
Manistee	1,327	39.09%	1,877	55.29%	190	5.60%	0	0.00%	-550	-16.20%	3,395
Manitou	18	10.84%	148	89.16%	0	0.00%	0	0.00%	-130	-78.31%	166
Marquette	4,249	73.50%	1,446	25.01%	86	1.49%	0	0.00%	2,803	48.49%	5,781
Mason	1,268	49.15%	1,238	47.95%	75	2.90%	0	0.00%	31	1.20%	2,582
Mecosta	2,340	53.17%	1,819	41.33%	242	5.50%	0	0.00%	521	11.84%	4,401
Menominee	2,586	72.56%	952	26.71%	26	0.73%	0	0.00%	1,634	45.85%	3,564
Midland	1,068	53.43%	875	43.77%	46	2.30%	10	0.50%	193	9.65%	1,999
Missaukee	466	53.56%	370	42.53%	34	3.91%	0	0.00%	96	11.03%	870
Monroe	3,075	42.91%	3,786	52.83%	295	4.12%	7	0.10%	-711	-9.92%	7,166
Montcalm	3,849	49.22%	3.754	48.01%	215	2.75%	1	0.01%	95	1.21%	7,820
Montmorency	90	37.82%	137	57.56%	11	4.62%	0	0.00%	-47	-19.75%	238
Muskegon	3,428	49.15%	3,166	45.39%	381	5.46%	0	0.00%	262	3.76%	6,975
Newaygo	1,946	46.11%	2,064	48.91%	210	4.98%	0	0.00%	-118	-2.80%	4,220
Oakland	4,844	44.72%	5,341	49.31%	647	5.97%	0	0.00%	-497	-4.59%	10,832
Oceana	1,597	49.78%	1,218	37.97%	393	12.25%	0	0.00%	379	11.81%	3,208
Ogemaw	495	50.98%	458	47.17%	17	1.75%	0	0.00%	37	3.81%	971
Ontonagon	298	53.31%	237	42.40%	22	3.94%	0	0.00%	61	10.91%	559
Osceola	1,466	57.31%	768	30.02%	324	12.67%	0	0.00%	698	27.29%	2,558
Oscoda	198	68.28%	88	30.34%	4	1.38%	0	0.00%	110	37.93%	290
Otsego	450	49.02%	413	44.99%	55	5.99%	0	0.00%	37	4.03%	918
Ottawa	3,655	52.44%	3,059	43.89%	253	3.63%	3	0.04%	596	8.55%	6,970
Presque Isle	400	64.31%	222	35.69%	0	0.00%	0	0.00%	178	28.62%	622
Roscommon	433	49.94%	431	49.71%	1	0.12%	2	0.23%	2	0.23%	867
Saginaw	6,084	45.78%	6,900	51.91%	252	1.90%	55	0.41%	-816	-6.14%	13,291
Sanilac	1,945	49.92%	1,755	45.05%	193	4.95%	2	0.05%	190	4.88%	3,896
Schoolcraft	561	67.67%	253	30.52%	14	1.69%	0	0.00%	308	37.15%	829
Shiawassee	2,659	41.15%	2,997	46.39%	789	12.21%	15	0.23%	-338	-5.23%	6,461
St. Clair	4,079	45.03%	4,568	50.43%	388	4.28%	14	0.15%	-489	-5.40%	9,058 (Note: Includes 9 Blank votes)
St. Joseph	3,212	46.20%	3,572	51.38%	162	2.33%	6	0.09%	-360	-5.18%	6,952
Tuscola	2,918	49.77%	2,576	43.94%	369	6.29%	0	0.00%	342	5.83%	5,863
Van Buren	4,276	56.20%	2,960	38.90%	366	4.81%	0	0.00%	1,316	17.30%	7,609 (Note: Includes 7 Scattering votes)
Washtenaw	3,934	39.44%	5,259	52.72%	782	7.84%	0	0.00%	-1,325	-13.28%	9,975
Wayne	16,827	43.43%	20,512	52.94%	1,406	3.63%	0	0.00%	-3,685	-9.51%	38,745
Wexford	1,219	54.06%	844	37.43%	192	8.51%	0	0.00%	375	16.63%	2,255
Total	190,840	47.67%	186,887	46.68%	22,207 (Note: The county results add up to 22,307)	5.55%	364	0.09%	3,953	0.99%	400,448

===== Counties that flipped from Democratic to Republican =====
- Alpena
- Baraga
- Calhoun
- Chippewa
- Genesee
- Midland
- Muskegon
- Roscommon

===== Counties that flipped from Republican to Democratic =====
- Berrien
- Clare
- Huron
- Montmorency
- Emmet
