= Josiah Begole =

American politician (1815–1896)

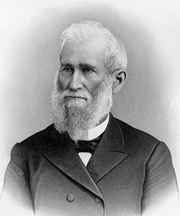

19th Governor of Michigan
- In office January 1, 1883 – January 1, 1885
- Lieutenant: Moreau S. Crosby
- Preceded by: David Jerome
- Succeeded by: Russell A. Alger

Member of the U.S. House of Representatives from Michigan's 6th district
- In office March 4, 1873 – March 3, 1875
- Preceded by: Jabez G. Sutherland
- Succeeded by: George H. Durand

Member of the Michigan Senate from the 23rd district
- In office 1870–1871
- Preceded by: Thaddeus G. Smith
- Succeeded by: Ira H. Butterfield

Personal details
- Born: January 20, 1815 Groveland, New York
- Died: June 5, 1896 (aged 81) Flint, Michigan
- Party: Republican (Until 1882) Democrat (From 1882)
- Spouse: Harriet A. Miles

Josiah Williams Begole (January 20, 1815 – June 5, 1896) was an American politician serving as a U.S. representative from 1873 to 1875 and the 19th governor of Michigan from 1883 to 1885.

== Early life in New York ==
Begole was born in Groveland, New York. His ancestors were French Huguenots who emigrated to the United States in the last quarter of the 18th century to escape religious persecution and settled in Hagerstown, Maryland. Josiah's father, William (1788–1862) was born there and moved to Livingston County, New York in 1802. William served in the War of 1812 and married the daughter of an American Revolutionary War veteran. Three of William's sons, including Josiah, the eldest, eventually moved to Genesee County, Michigan. He attended the public schools in Mount Morris and Temple Hill Academy in Geneseo, New York.

== Life and politics in Michigan ==
Begole moved to Flint, Michigan in August 1836 and taught school in 1837 and 1838. In the spring of 1839, he married Harriet A. Miles. He engaged in agricultural pursuits from 1839 to 1856 and was school inspector, justice of the peace and township treasurer. Being an anti-slavery man, he became a member of the Republican party at its organization. He was county treasurer 1856–1864. He was briefly engaged in the lumber business in 1863. His eldest son was killed during the American Civil War near Atlanta, Georgia in 1864; this was the greatest sorrow of his life.

He was a member of the Michigan Senate in 1870 and 1871, and a member of the Flint City Council for three years. During that time, he served on the Committees of Finance and Railroads, and was Chairman of the Committee on the Institute for the Deaf and Dumb and Blind. He was a delegate to the Republican National Convention at Philadelphia in 1872 to re-nominate U.S. President Ulysses S. Grant and to nominate Henry Wilson as the new Vice President.

== Congress ==
Begole was elected as a Republican from Michigan's 6th congressional district to the United States House of Representatives for the 43rd Congress, serving from March 4, 1873, to March 3, 1875. During that time, he was a member of the Committee on Agricultural and Public Expenditures. He was an unsuccessful candidate for re-election in 1874 and resumed the lumber business, Begole Fox & Co. He later engaged in the manufacture of wagons founding Flint Wagon Works and also engaged in banking.

== Governor ==
In 1882, Begole was gubernatorial candidate of the Greenback and Democratic parties, defeating the Republican incumbent David Jerome by over 7,000 votes. He served one term from 1883 to 1885. As a former Republican who ousted a Republican incumbent, Begole faced many obstacles with a Republican-dominated legislature. As a result, the establishment of the state bureau of labor statistics was one of the few acts that was approved. He ran for re-election in 1884, but was defeated by Republican Russell Alger, after which he resumed his former business activities.

He was an early activist for women's suffrage, and in 1884 Begole became vice president of the first statewide suffrage organization, the Michigan Equal Suffrage Association.

== Retirement and death ==
Begole died at the age of eighty-one in Flint and is interred in Glenwood Cemetery there.

Party political offices
| Preceded by Frederick M. Holloway | Democratic nominee for Governor of Michigan; 1882, 1884 | Succeeded by George L. Yaple |
U.S. House of Representatives
| Preceded by Jabez G. Sutherland | United States Representative for the 6th congressional district of Michigan; 1873 – 1875 | Succeeded by George H. Durand |
Political offices
| Preceded by David Jerome | Governor of Michigan; 1883–1885 | Succeeded by Russell A. Alger |
