= 1882 Michigan gubernatorial election =

- November 7, 1882
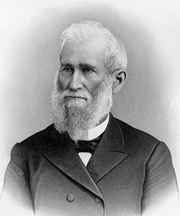

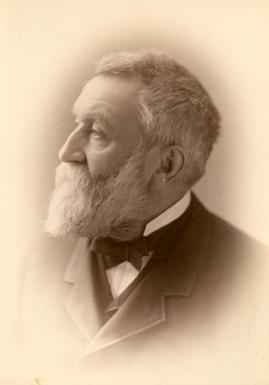
Nominee	Josiah Begole	David Jerome
Party	Democratic	Republican
Alliance	Greenback
Popular vote	154,451	149,697
Percentage	49.28%	47.76%
- County results Begole: 40–50% 50–60% 60–70% 70–80% Jerome: 40–50% 50–60% 60–70% 70–80% No data/vote
Governor before election
David Jerome
Republican
Elected Governor
Josiah W. Begole
Democratic

The 1882 Michigan gubernatorial election was held on November 7, 1882. Josiah W. Begole ran on a fusion ticket, representing both the Democratic and Greenback parties. He defeated incumbent Republican David Jerome with 49.28% of the vote. Begole was the first Democrat to be elected governor of Michigan since Robert McClelland in 1852.

== General election ==
=== Candidates ===
- Josiah Begole, former U.S. representative and state senator from Flint (Democratic and Greenback)
- Charles C. Foote, Presbyterian minister (American)
- David Jerome, incumbent governor (Republican)
- Waldo May (National)
- Daniel P. Sagendorph (Prohibition)

=== Results ===
1882 Michigan gubernatorial election (Note: Imperfect votes have been assigned to their respective intended candidates. Certified totals: Begole 154,269; Jerome 149,697; Sagendorph 5,854; May 2,006; Foote 343; Scattering 171)
Party	Candidate	Votes	%	±%
Fusion	Josiah W. Begole	154,451	49.28%	+10.29%
Republican	David Jerome (inc.)	149,697	47.76%	−2.90%
Prohibition	Daniel P. Sagendorph	6,752	2.15%	+1.82%
National	Waldo May	2,006	0.64%	−9.30%
American	Charles C. Foote	343	0.11%	
	Scattering	171	0.05%	
Plurality		4,754	1.52%	
Total votes		313,420	100.00%	
Democratic gain from Republican		Swing	+13.19%	

==== Results by county ====
The following counties voted Democratic for the first time since 1852: Barry, Cass, Kent, Newaygo, and St. Joseph. Calhoun County voted Democratic for the first time since 1851. The following counties voted Democratic for the first time ever: Leelanau, Midland, and Muskegon. This was the first gubernatorial election in which Hillsdale County backed the losing candidate, while Van Buren County failed to back the winning candidate for the first time since 1839.

County	Josiah W. Begole Fusion		David Jerome Republican		Daniel P. Sagendorph Prohibition		Waldo May National		Charles C. Foote American		Scattering Write-in		Margin		Total votes cast
County	#	%	#	%	#	%	#	%	#	%	#	%	#	%	Total votes cast
Alcona	193	28.76%	478	71.24%	0	0.00%	0	0.00%	0	0.00%	0	0.00%	-285	-42.47%	671
Allegan	3,028	46.14%	3,394	51.71%	109	1.66%	4	0.06%	27	0.41%	1	0.02%	-366	-5.58%	6,563
Alpena	857	50.71%	831	49.17%	2	0.12%	0	0.00%	0	0.00%	0	0.00%	26	1.54%	1,690
Antrim	376	37.87%	586	59.01%	28	2.82%	0	0.00%	0	0.00%	3	0.30%	-210	-21.15%	993
Baraga	258	54.09%	216	45.28%	3	0.63%	0	0.00%	0	0.00%	0	0.00%	42	8.81%	477
Barry	2,750	52.66%	2,259	43.26%	202	3.87%	0	0.00%	11	0.21%	0	0.00%	491	9.40%	5,222
Bay	3,318	52.01%	2,156	33.79%	80	1.25%	818	12.82%	0	0.00%	8	0.13%	1,162	18.21%	6,380
Benzie	293	44.39%	362	54.85%	4	0.61%	0	0.00%	1	0.15%	0	0.00%	-69	-10.45%	660
Berrien	3,919	49.17%	3,947	49.52%	100	1.25%	0	0.00%	3	0.04%	1	0.01%	-28	-0.35%	7,970
Branch	2,491	43.07%	3,203	55.39%	57	0.99%	0	0.00%	31	0.54%	1	0.02%	-712	-12.31%	5,783
Calhoun	3,547	47.55%	3,439	46.10%	472	6.33%	0	0.00%	2	0.03%	0	0.00%	108	1.45%	7,460
Cass	2,537	50.41%	2,466	49.00%	29	0.58%	1	0.02%	0	0.00%	0	0.00%	71	1.41%	5,033
Charlevoix	432	38.57%	658	58.75%	30	2.68%	0	0.00%	0	0.00%	0	0.00%	-226	-20.18%	1,120
Cheboygan	692	55.14%	558	44.46%	5	0.40%	0	0.00%	0	0.00%	0	0.00%	134	10.68%	1,255
Chippewa	446	54.00%	377	45.64%	3	0.36%	0	0.00%	0	0.00%	0	0.00%	69	8.35%	826
Clare	395	44.38%	469	52.70%	26	2.92%	0	0.00%	0	0.00%	0	0.00%	-74	-8.31%	890
Clinton	3,323	53.42%	2,798	44.98%	97	1.56%	0	0.00%	2	0.03%	1	0.02%	525	8.44%	6,221
Crawford	159	36.30%	278	63.47%	0	0.00%	1	0.23%	0	0.00%	0	0.00%	-119	-27.17%	438
Delta	439	48.62%	459	50.83%	5	0.55%	0	0.00%	0	0.00%	0	0.00%	-20	-2.21%	903
Eaton	3,352	47.37%	3,420	48.33%	298	4.21%	0	0.00%	0	0.00%	6	0.08%	-68	-0.96%	7,076
Emmet	759	51.74%	628	42.81%	80	5.45%	0	0.00%	0	0.00%	0	0.00%	131	8.93%	1,467
Genesee	4,126	52.67%	3,505	44.74%	180	2.30%	0	0.00%	23	0.29%	0	0.00%	621	7.93%	7,834
Gladwin	116	40.42%	171	59.58%	0	0.00%	0	0.00%	0	0.00%	0	0.00%	-55	-19.16%	287
Grand Traverse	565	34.83%	1,011	62.33%	46	2.84%	0	0.00%	0	0.00%	0	0.00%	-446	-27.50%	1,622
Gratiot	2,515	51.38%	2,260	46.17%	110	2.25%	7	0.14%	0	0.00%	3	0.06%	255	5.21%	4,895
Hillsdale	3,005	44.82%	3,471	51.77%	188	2.80%	23	0.34%	18	0.27%	0	0.00%	-466	-6.95%	6,705
Houghton	880	40.07%	1,254	57.10%	62	2.82%	0	0.00%	0	0.00%	0	0.00%	-374	-17.03%	2,196
Huron	1,181	43.09%	1,547	56.44%	12	0.44%	0	0.00%	0	0.00%	1	0.04%	-366	-13.35%	2,741
Ingham	4,279	54.96%	3,299	42.38%	164	2.11%	42	0.54%	0	0.00%	1	0.01%	980	12.59%	7,785
Ionia	3,275	49.94%	2,573	39.23%	370	5.64%	322	4.91%	15	0.23%	3	0.05%	702	10.70%	6,558
Iosco	464	37.15%	731	58.53%	54	4.32%	0	0.00%	0	0.00%	0	0.00%	-267	-21.38%	1,249
Isabella	1,100	46.53%	1,252	52.96%	12	0.51%	0	0.00%	0	0.00%	0	0.00%	-152	-6.43%	2,364
Jackson	5,193	55.92%	3,805	40.98%	258	2.78%	1	0.01%	29	0.31%	0	0.00%	1,388	14.95%	9,286
Kalamazoo	3,265	47.62%	3,538	51.60%	0	0.00%	0	0.00%	7	0.10%	46	0.67%	-273	-3.98%	6,856
Kalkaska	320	41.03%	451	57.82%	9	1.15%	0	0.00%	0	0.00%	0	0.00%	-131	-16.79%	780
Kent	8,181	54.86%	6,320	42.38%	371	2.49%	7	0.05%	26	0.17%	7	0.05%	1,861	12.48%	14,912
Keweenaw	219	32.30%	445	65.63%	10	1.47%	0	0.00%	0	0.00%	4	0.59%	-226	-33.33%	678
Lake	468	39.39%	614	51.68%	105	8.84%	0	0.00%	0	0.00%	1	0.08%	-146	-12.29%	1,188
Lapeer	2,058	46.54%	2,269	51.31%	87	1.97%	0	0.00%	8	0.18%	0	0.00%	-211	-4.77%	4,422
Leelanau	387	50.79%	374	49.08%	1	0.13%	0	0.00%	0	0.00%	0	0.00%	13	1.71%	762
Lenawee	5,100	46.86%	5,186	47.65%	574	5.27%	15	0.14%	7	0.06%	2	0.02%	-86	-0.79%	10,884
Livingston	2,953	52.80%	2,580	46.13%	48	0.86%	0	0.00%	12	0.21%	0	0.00%	373	6.67%	5,593
Mackinac	382	57.97%	276	41.88%	1	0.15%	0	0.00%	0	0.00%	0	0.00%	106	16.08%	659
Macomb	3,048	53.83%	2,547	44.98%	66	1.17%	0	0.00%	0	0.00%	1	0.02%	501	8.85%	5,662
Manistee	1,664	58.43%	1,132	39.75%	52	1.83%	0	0.00%	0	0.00%	0	0.00%	532	18.68%	2,848
Manitou	100	71.43%	40	28.57%	0	0.00%	0	0.00%	0	0.00%	0	0.00%	60	42.86%	140
Marquette	1,304	30.02%	2,995	68.95%	45	1.04%	0	0.00%	0	0.00%	0	0.00%	-1,691	-38.93%	4,344
Mason	921	45.24%	1,067	52.41%	48	2.36%	0	0.00%	0	0.00%	0	0.00%	-146	-7.17%	2,036
Mecosta	1,228	46.41%	1,367	51.66%	44	1.66%	0	0.00%	7	0.26%	0	0.00%	-139	-5.25%	2,646
Menominee	661	29.09%	1,506	66.29%	97	4.27%	0	0.00%	0	0.00%	8	0.35%	-845	-37.19%	2,272
Midland	864	52.27%	783	47.37%	5	0.30%	0	0.00%	0	0.00%	1	0.06%	81	4.90%	1,653
Missaukee	175	43.10%	231	56.90%	0	0.00%	0	0.00%	0	0.00%	0	0.00%	-56	-13.79%	406
Monroe	3,210	55.52%	2,399	41.49%	92	1.59%	58	1.00%	11	0.19%	12	0.21%	811	14.03%	5,782
Montcalm	2,793	48.03%	2,819	48.48%	200	3.44%	1	0.02%	0	0.00%	2	0.03%	-26	-0.45%	5,815
Montmorency	58	33.92%	113	66.08%	0	0.00%	0	0.00%	0	0.00%	0	0.00%	-55	-32.16%	171
Muskegon	2,778	58.32%	1,847	38.78%	138	2.90%	0	0.00%	0	0.00%	0	0.00%	931	19.55%	4,763
Newaygo	1,657	54.85%	1,243	41.15%	121	4.01%	0	0.00%	0	0.00%	0	0.00%	414	13.70%	3,021
Oakland	5,093	51.86%	4,559	46.43%	148	1.51%	1	0.01%	17	0.17%	2	0.02%	534	5.44%	9,820
Oceana	1,006	48.09%	1,022	48.85%	59	2.82%	0	0.00%	5	0.24%	0	0.00%	-16	-0.76%	2,092
Ogemaw	300	44.18%	378	55.67%	0	0.00%	1	0.15%	0	0.00%	0	0.00%	-78	-11.49%	679
Ontonagon	235	39.97%	349	59.35%	4	0.68%	0	0.00%	0	0.00%	0	0.00%	-114	-19.39%	588
Osceola	495	36.64%	731	54.11%	125	9.25%	0	0.00%	0	0.00%	0	0.00%	-236	-17.47%	1,351
Oscoda	43	20.98%	117	57.07%	4	1.95%	41	20.00%	0	0.00%	0	0.00%	-74	-36.10%	205
Otsego	207	28.20%	469	63.90%	47	6.40%	11	1.50%	0	0.00%	0	0.00%	-262	-35.69%	734
Ottawa	2,775	48.57%	2,849	49.87%	33	0.58%	9	0.16%	45	0.79%	2	0.04%	-74	-1.30%	5,713
Presque Isle	239	45.01%	290	54.61%	0	0.00%	0	0.00%	0	0.00%	2	0.38%	-51	-9.60%	531
Roscommon	296	60.29%	194	39.51%	0	0.00%	0	0.00%	0	0.00%	1	0.20%	102	20.77%	491
Saginaw	4,520	49.56%	3,969	43.51%	98	1.07%	534	5.85%	0	0.00%	0	0.00%	551	6.04%	9,121
Sanilac	1,301	43.70%	1,656	55.63%	12	0.40%	0	0.00%	0	0.00%	8	0.27%	-355	-11.92%	2,977
Schoolcraft	145	23.35%	476	76.65%	0	0.00%	0	0.00%	0	0.00%	0	0.00%	-331	-53.30%	621
Shiawassee	2,872	51.72%	2,524	45.45%	148	2.67%	0	0.00%	9	0.16%	0	0.00%	348	6.27%	5,553
St. Clair	3,519	50.34%	3,400	48.64%	45	0.64%	0	0.00%	0	0.00%	26	0.37%	119	1.70%	6,990
St. Joseph	3,306	54.61%	2,707	44.71%	33	0.55%	0	0.00%	0	0.00%	8	0.13%	599	9.89%	6,054
Tuscola	1,872	42.56%	2,343	53.26%	183	4.16%	0	0.00%	1	0.02%	0	0.00%	-471	-10.71%	4,399
Van Buren	2,855	43.11%	3,662	55.30%	97	1.46%	0	0.00%	7	0.11%	1	0.02%	-807	-12.19%	6,622
Washtenaw	4,541	53.96%	3,413	40.56%	346	4.11%	109	1.30%	0	0.00%	6	0.07%	1,128	13.40%	8,415
Wayne	14,236	50.68%	13,743	48.92%	108	0.38%	0	0.00%	3	0.01%	2	0.01%	493	1.75%	28,092
Wexford	538	36.87%	843	57.78%	62	4.25%	0	0.00%	16	1.10%	0	0.00%	-305	-20.90%	1,459
Total	154,451	49.28%	149,697	47.76%	6,752	2.15%	2,006	0.64%	343	0.11%	171	0.05%	4,754	1.52%	313,420

===== Counties that flipped from Republican to Democratic =====
- Alpena
- Barry
- Calhoun
- Cass
- Cheboygan
- Chippewa
- Clinton
- Emmet
- Genesee
- Gratiot
- Ingham
- Ionia
- Jackson
- Kent
- Leelanau
- Livingston
- Manistee
- Midland
- Muskegon
- Newaygo
- Oakland
- Shiawassee
- St. Clair
- St. Joseph

===== Counties that flipped from Democratic to Republican =====
- Gladwin
- Ontonagon
