= 1886 Michigan gubernatorial election =

- November 2, 1886
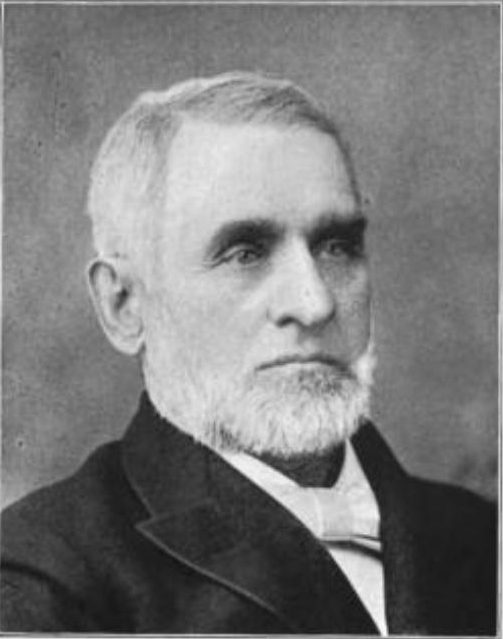

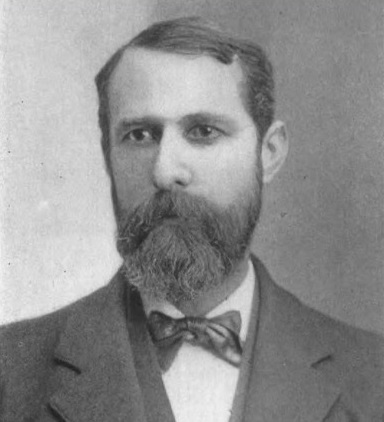

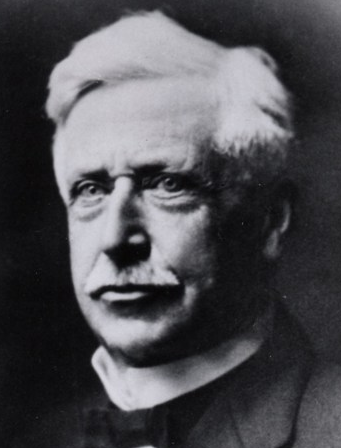
Nominee	Cyrus G. Luce	George L. Yaple	Samuel Dickie
Party	Republican	Democratic	Prohibition
Alliance		Greenback
Popular vote	181,474	174,042	25,326
Percentage	47.65%	45.69%	6.65%
- County results Luce: 40–50% 50–60% 60–70% Yaple: 40–50% 50–60% 60–70% 70–80%
Governor before election
Russell A. Alger
Republican
Elected Governor
Cyrus G. Luce
Republican

The 1886 Michigan gubernatorial election was held on November 2, 1886. Republican nominee Cyrus G. Luce defeated Fusion candidate George L. Yaple with 47.65% of the vote.

== General election ==
=== Candidates ===
Major party candidates

- Cyrus G. Luce, Republican
- George L. Yaple, Democratic (Note: Yaple ran under a fusion ticket between the Democrats and the Greenbackers.)

Other candidates

- Samuel Dickie, Prohibition

=== Results ===
1886 Michigan gubernatorial election
Party	Candidate	Votes	%	±%
Republican	Cyrus G. Luce	181,474	47.65%	−0.02%
Fusion	George L. Yaple	174,042	45.69%	−0.99%
Prohibition	Samuel Dickie	25,326 (Note: Includes 147 votes in Wexford that were listed separately for "Samuel F. Dickie".)	6.65%	+1.10%
	Scattering	37	0.01%	
	Blank	6	0.00%	
Plurality		7,432	1.95%	
Total votes		380,885	100.00%	
Republican hold		Swing	+0.96%	

==== Results by county ====
Menominee County, Missaukee County, and Otsego County voted Democratic for the first time ever in this election, while Iosco County voted Democratic for the first time since 1862. After this election, Chippewa County would not vote Democratic again until 1912, Midland County not again until 1914, and Menominee County would not vote Democratic again until 1932.

County	Cyrus G. Luce Republican		George L. Yaple Fusion		Samuel Dickie Prohibition		Margin		Total votes cast
County	#	%	#	%	#	%	#	%	Total votes cast
Alcona	356	54.43%	297	45.41%	1	0.15%	59	9.02%	654
Alger	247	67.86%	95	26.10%	22	6.04%	152	41.76%	364
Allegan	3,671	49.18%	2,934	39.30%	860	11.52%	737	9.87%	7,465
Alpena	1,119	44.85%	1,257	50.38%	119	4.77%	-138	-5.53%	2,495
Antrim	906	60.64%	522	34.94%	64	4.28%	384	25.70%	1,494 (Note: Includes 2 Scattering votes)
Arenac	262	31.72%	551	66.71%	13	1.57%	-289	-34.99%	826
Baraga	349	48.95%	358	50.21%	6	0.84%	-9	-1.26%	713
Barry	2,675	45.80%	2,565	43.92%	600	10.27%	110	1.88%	5,840
Bay	2,957	39.71%	4,305	57.82%	182	2.44%	-1,348	-18.10%	7,446
Benzie	521	50.58%	406	39.42%	103	10.00%	115	11.17%	1,030
Berrien	4,262	49.65%	3,788	44.13%	534	6.22%	474	5.52%	8,584
Branch	3,525	51.49%	2,767	40.42%	553	8.08%	758	11.07%	6,846 (Note: Includes 1 Scattering vote)
Calhoun	4,145	48.49%	3,439	40.23%	964	11.28%	706	8.26%	8,549 (Note: Includes 1 Blank vote)
Cass	2,576	47.39%	2,478	45.58%	380	6.99%	98	1.80%	5,436 (Note: Includes 1 Scattering vote and 1 Blank vote)
Charlevoix	1,044	52.89%	773	39.16%	157	7.95%	271	13.73%	1,974
Cheboygan	714	39.69%	1,031	57.31%	54	3.00%	-317	-17.62%	1,799
Chippewa	677	44.34%	816	53.44%	34	2.23%	-139	-9.10%	1,527
Clare	509	42.81%	641	53.91%	39	3.28%	-132	-11.10%	1,189
Clinton	2,996	46.78%	2,953	46.10%	456	7.12%	43	0.67%	6,405
Crawford	268	50.00%	253	47.20%	14	2.61%	15	2.80%	536
Delta	921	54.79%	735	43.72%	19	1.13%	186	11.06%	1,681 (Note: Includes 6 Scattering votes)
Eaton	3,903	47.77%	3,377	41.33%	890	10.89%	526	6.44%	8,170
Emmet	793	45.37%	827	47.31%	128	7.32%	-34	-1.95%	1,748
Genesee	4,517	52.27%	3,021	34.96%	1,104	12.77%	1,496	17.31%	8,642
Gladwin	297	58.12%	174	34.05%	40	7.83%	123	24.07%	511
Grand Traverse	1,328	62.49%	624	29.36%	173	8.14%	704	33.13%	2,125
Gratiot	2,912	49.88%	2,603	44.59%	323	5.53%	309	5.29%	5,838
Hillsdale	4,368	55.66%	2,774	35.35%	706	9.00%	1,594	20.31%	7,848
Houghton	2,298	54.90%	1,844	44.05%	44	1.05%	454	10.85%	4,186
Huron	1,513	41.51%	1,730	47.46%	402	11.03%	-217	-5.95%	3,645
Ingham	3,698	42.60%	4,077	46.97%	905	10.43%	-379	-4.37%	8,680
Ionia	3,572	44.68%	3,915	48.97%	507	6.34%	-343	-4.29%	7,995
Iosco	895	39.96%	1,085	48.44%	260	11.61%	-190	-8.48%	2,240
Iron	797	62.71%	474	37.29%	0	0.00%	323	25.41%	1,271
Isabella	1,659	49.05%	1,599	47.28%	124	3.67%	60	1.77%	3,382
Jackson	4,754	47.54%	4,406	44.06%	839	8.39%	348	3.48%	10,000
Kalamazoo	4,293	50.93%	3,566	42.31%	570	6.76%	727	8.62%	8,429
Kalkaska	590	60.64%	302	31.04%	81	8.32%	288	29.60%	973
Kent	7,763	43.21%	8,670	48.26%	1,531	8.52%	-907	-5.05%	17,964
Keweenaw	398	67.92%	187	31.91%	1	0.17%	211	36.01%	586
Lake	877	50.64%	716	41.34%	139	8.03%	161	9.30%	1,732
Lapeer	2,888	50.83%	2,450	43.12%	344	6.05%	438	7.71%	5,682
Leelanau	666	55.69%	489	40.89%	41	3.43%	177	14.80%	1,196
Lenawee	5,523	47.53%	5,010	43.12%	1,087	9.35%	513	4.41%	11,620
Livingston	2,459	42.79%	2,784	48.45%	503	8.75%	-325	-5.66%	5,746
Mackinac	490	43.63%	591	52.63%	42	3.74%	-101	-8.99%	1,123
Macomb	2,469	42.93%	3,016	52.44%	266	4.63%	-547	-9.51%	5,751
Manistee	1,198	37.63%	1,744	54.77%	242	7.60%	-546	-17.15%	3,184
Manitou	22	23.40%	72	76.60%	0	0.00%	-50	-53.19%	94
Marquette	3,118	65.68%	1,599	33.68%	30	0.63%	1,519	32.00%	4,747
Mason	1,304	53.27%	1,091	44.57%	53	2.17%	213	8.70%	2,448
Mecosta	2,049	54.19%	1,444	38.19%	288	7.62%	605	16.00%	3,781
Menominee	1,687	43.57%	2,113	54.57%	72	1.86%	-426	-11.00%	3,872
Midland	1,033	45.11%	1,125	49.13%	132	5.76%	-92	-4.02%	2,290
Missaukee	432	44.31%	510	52.31%	33	3.38%	-78	-8.00%	975
Monroe	2,547	43.07%	3,095	52.33%	272	4.60%	-548	-9.27%	5,914
Montcalm	3,595	48.74%	3,285	44.54%	495	6.71%	310	4.20%	7,376
Montmorency	127	43.20%	157	53.40%	10	3.40%	-30	-10.20%	294
Muskegon	3,137	49.38%	2,824	44.45%	390	6.14%	313	4.93%	6,353
Newaygo	1,844	48.68%	1,696	44.77%	248	6.55%	148	3.91%	3,788
Oakland	4,647	45.60%	4,842	47.51%	688	6.75%	-195	-1.91%	10,191 (Note: Includes 14 Scattering votes)
Oceana	1,280	43.90%	1,135	38.92%	500	17.15%	145	4.97%	2,916
Ogemaw	520	48.55%	500	46.69%	51	4.76%	20	1.87%	1,071
Ontonagon	824	51.82%	765	48.11%	0	0.00%	59	3.71%	1,590
Osceola	1,234	55.91%	657	29.77%	316	14.32%	577	26.14%	2,207
Oscoda	238	47.22%	264	52.38%	2	0.40%	-26	-5.16%	504
Otsego	413	41.47%	464	46.59%	119	11.95%	-51	-5.12%	996
Ottawa	3,423	53.58%	2,639	41.31%	326	5.10%	784	12.27%	6,388
Presque Isle	420	54.62%	340	44.21%	9	1.17%	80	10.40%	769
Roscommon	274	45.51%	327	54.32%	1	0.17%	-53	-8.80%	602
Saginaw	5,447	43.63%	6,723	53.85%	315	2.52%	-1,276	-10.22%	12,485
Sanilac	2,312	51.99%	1,832	41.20%	303	6.81%	480	10.79%	4,447
Schoolcraft	542	50.84%	524	49.16%	0	0.00%	18	1.69%	1,066
Shiawassee	3,034	45.54%	2,834	42.53%	795	11.93%	200	3.00%	6,663
St. Clair	4,074	45.70%	4,368	49.00%	469	5.26%	-294	-3.30%	8,915 (Note: Includes 4 Blank votes)
St. Joseph	3,068	47.78%	3,187	49.63%	166	2.59%	-119	-1.85%	6,421
Tuscola	3,092	52.67%	2,369	40.36%	409	6.97%	723	12.32%	5,870
Van Buren	3,983	55.59%	2,693	37.59%	489	6.82%	1,290	18.00%	7,165
Washtenaw	3,628	39.61%	4,718	51.51%	814	8.89%	-1,090	-11.90%	9,160
Wayne	15,392	44.79%	18,049	52.53%	918	2.67%	-2,657	-7.73%	34,362 (Note: Includes 3 Scattering votes)
Wexford	1,116	54.57%	782	38.24%	147	7.19%	334	16.33%	2,045
Total	181,474	47.65%	174,042	45.69%	25,326	6.65%	7,432	1.95%	380,885

===== Counties that flipped from Democratic to Republican =====
- Barry
- Berrien
- Cass
- Clinton
- Gratiot
- Jackson
- Newaygo
- Shiawassee

===== Counties that flipped from Republican to Democratic =====
- Alpena
- Baraga
- Chippewa
- Iosco
- Menominee
- Midland
- Missaukee
- Oscoda
- Otsego
- Roscommon
