= John B. Finch =

American politician

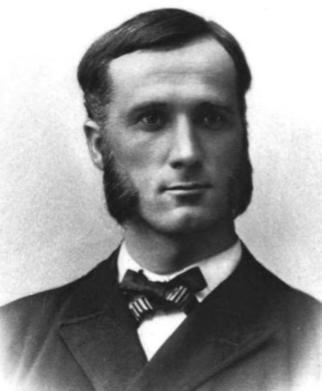

5th Chairman of the Prohibition Party
- In office 1884 – October 3, 1887
- Preceded by: Gideon T. Stewart
- Succeeded by: Samuel Dickie

Personal details
- Born: John Bird Finch; March 17, 1852 Lincklaen, New York, U.S.
- Died: October 3, 1887 (aged 35) Boston, Massachusetts, U.S.
- Party: Prohibition
- Other political affiliations: Democratic
- Spouse(s): Uretta Lemira Coy (m. 1871; died 1874) Frances E. Manchester (m. 1876)
- Parents: William Finch (father); Emeline A. Fox (mother)
- Education: Harvard University
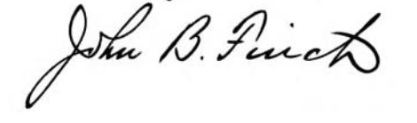
- Signature

John Bird Finch (March 17, 1852 – October 3, 1887) was an American politician and educator who served as the chairman of the Prohibition Party.

== Life ==
John Bird Finch was born on March 17, 1852, to William Finch and Emeline A. Fox in Lincklaen, New York. His mother's father died after being thrown out of a carriage while drunk and she raised him to support alcoholic prohibition. In 1854, his family moved to Union Valley, New York and later suffered from scarlet fever in 1855. He started teaching at age 16 in 1870, graduated from Harvard University, and later became the superintendent of Union School in Smyrna, New York.

In 1877, he served as a delegate for Cortland County, New York to the Prohibition state convention in Utica on August 15 and was made chairman of the committee on nominations. In 1878, he moved to Lincoln, Nebraska and became a member of the Democratic Party until 1880, when he rejoined the Prohibition Party. In 1882, he voted for James W. Dawes for governor due to J. Sterling Morton, the Democratic gubernatorial nominee, being against prohibition, supported for lieutenant governor, and left the remainder of his ballot blank. In 1884, he was selected to become the chairman of the Prohibition Party and later moved to Evanston, Illinois. At the 1884 National Prohibition Convention, he motioned to make the presidential nomination of John St. John unanimous.

On October 3, 1887, Finch gave a speech in Lynn, Massachusetts and then traveled to Boston aboard a train where he died of a heart attack at age 35. Clinton B. Fisk, the party's presidential candidate, gave a speech in his honor and Samuel Dickie was selected to replace him as the party's chairman.
