= George L. Yaple =

American politician and judge

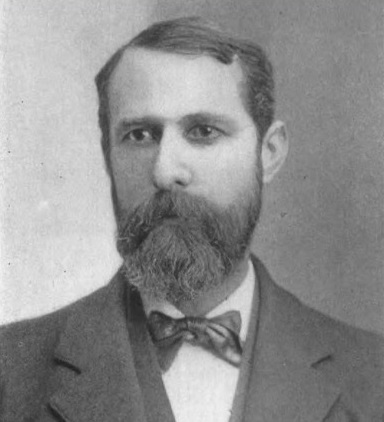

Member of the U.S. House of Representatives from Michigan's 4th district
- In office March 4, 1883 – March 3, 1885
- Preceded by: Julius C. Burrows
- Succeeded by: Julius C. Burrows

Personal details
- Born: February 20, 1851 Leonidas, Michigan
- Died: December 16, 1939 (aged 88) Mendon, Michigan
- Resting place: Mendon Cemetery
- Party: Democratic
- Education: Northwestern University

George Lewis Yaple (February 20, 1851 – December 16, 1939) was a politician and jurist from the U.S. state of Michigan.

Yaple was born in Leonidas, Michigan, and moved with his parents to Mendon, Michigan, in 1857. He attended the common schools and Albion College, and graduated from Northwestern University in 1871. He completed a postgraduate course in 1874, studied law with a local attorney, and was admitted to the bar in 1872. He farmed until 1877, then commenced the practice of law in Mendon.

He was an unsuccessful candidate of the Greenback Party for election in 1880 to the Forty-seventh Congress. In 1882, running as a Fusion candidate, Yaple defeated incumbent Republican Julius C. Burrows to represent Michigan's 4th congressional district in the Forty-eighth Congress, serving from March 4, 1883, until March 3, 1885. Although elected as a Fusion candidate, he sat with the Democrats in Congress.

He was an unsuccessful candidate for reelection in 1884 to the Forty-ninth Congress. In 1886, he ran as a Fusion candidate for election as Governor of Michigan, losing in the general election to Republican Cyrus G. Luce. He was a delegate to the Democratic National Convention in 1888 and twice ran again for Congress, losing to Julius C. Burrows in 1890, and to Henry F. Thomas in 1892.

Yaple was elected circuit judge of the fifteenth circuit of Michigan, serving from 1894 until 1911. In 1916, he became a member of the Republican Party. After retiring, he resided until his death in Mendon. He was buried at Mendon Cemetery in Mendon.

Party political offices
Preceded by Josiah Begole	Democratic nominee for Governor of Michigan; 1886	Succeeded by Wellington R. Burt
U.S. House of Representatives
Preceded by Julius C. Burrows	United States Representative for the 4th congressional district of Michigan; 1883 – 1885	Succeeded by Julius C. Burrows
