= Taymouth Township, Michigan =

- Civil township
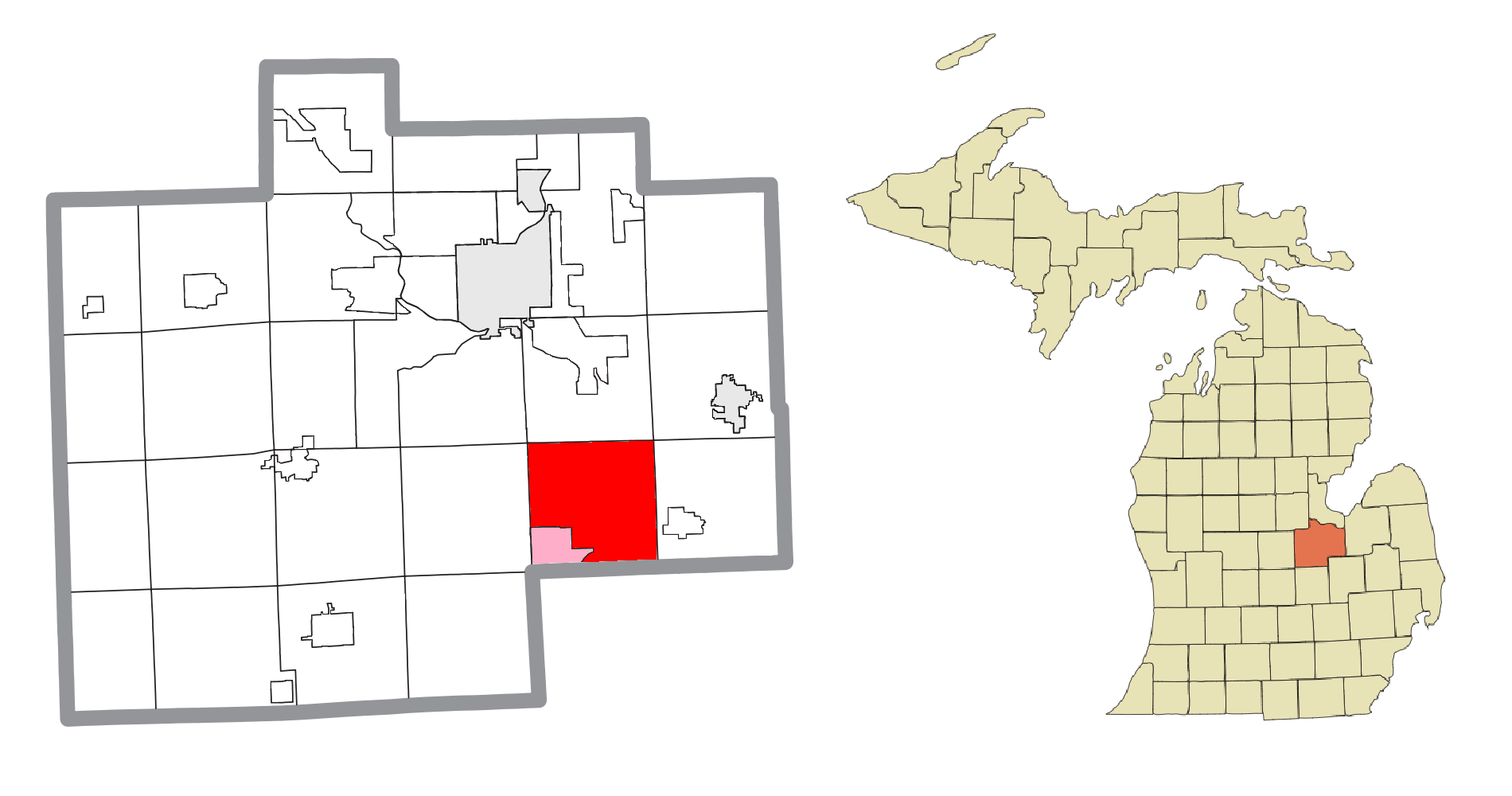
- Location within Saginaw County (red) and the administered community of Burt (pink)

- Location within the state of Michigan Taymouth Township (the United States)
- Coordinates: 43°16′01″N 83°51′52″W
- Country: United States
- State: Michigan
- County: Saginaw

Government
  - Supervisor: Dennis Fent
  - Clerk: Gail Basner

Area
  - Total: 35.7 sq mi (92.4 km^{2})
  - Land: 35.6 sq mi (92.1 km^{2})
  - Water: 0.12 sq mi (0.3 km^{2})
- Elevation: 614 ft (187 m)

Population (2020)
  - Total: 4,065
  - Density: 114/sq mi (44.1/km^{2})
- Time zone: UTC-5 (Eastern (EST))
  - Summer (DST): UTC-4 (EDT)
- ZIP code(s): 48415 (Birch Run); 48417 (Burt); 48457 (Montrose)
- Area code: 989
- FIPS code: 26-79100
- GNIS feature ID: 1627154
- Website: Official website

Taymouth Township is a civil township of Saginaw County in the U.S. state of Michigan. The population was 4,065 at the 2020 Census.

== Communities ==
- Burt is an unincorporated community in the township and is a census-designated place (CDP) for statistical purposes.
- Fosters is an unincorporated community in the township between the two segments of Busch Road west of Huron & Eastern Railway and Dorwood Road, basically consisting of Saginaw Street, Fosters Road, Railroad Street, Hasting Street and Washington Street.
- Morseville is an unincorporated community in the township at Morseville and Burt Roads. The Morseville Bridge over the Flint River is listed on the National Register of Historic Places.
- Taymouth is an unincorporated community in the township at 43°14′34″N 83°52′26″W on Seymour Road between Birch Run and Burt Roads. A post office operated here from January 18, 1858, until June 30, 1903.

== Geography ==
According to the United States Census Bureau, the township has a total area of 35.7 square miles (92 km^{2}), of which 35.6 square miles (92 km^{2}) is land and 0.1 square miles (0.26 km^{2}) (0.34%) is water.

== Demographics ==
According to the 2020 census, there were 4,065 people, 1,562 households and 1,175 families residing in the township. The population density was 114.2 per square mile (44.1/km^{2}). There were 1,738 housing units at an average density of 48.8 per square mile (18.8/km^{2}). The racial makeup of the township was 92% White, 0.65% African American, 0.34% Native American, 0.22% Asian, 0% Pacific Islander, 0.76% from other races and 6.07% from two or more races. Hispanics or Latinos of any race were 3.37% of the population.

There were 1,562 households, out of which 20.4% had children under the age of 18 living with them, 64.1% were married couples living together, 13.4% had a female householder with no husband present and 18.1% were non-families. 14.5% of all households were made up of individuals, and 5.8% had someone living alone who was 65 years of age or older. The average household size was 2.6 and the average family size was 2.93.

20.4% of the population were under the age of 18, 8.1% from 18 to 24, 19.7% from 25 to 44, 28.9% from 45 to 64, and 22.9% were 65 years of age or older. The median age was 46.7 years. For every 100 females, there were 102.4 males. For every 100 females age 18 and over, there were 99.6 males.

The median household income was $81,667 and the median family income was $85,644. Males had a median income of $62,813 and females $30,417. The per capita income was $35,332. About 2% of families and 2.4% of the population were below the poverty line.
