= Burt, Michigan =

- Census-designated place (CDP) & unincorporated community
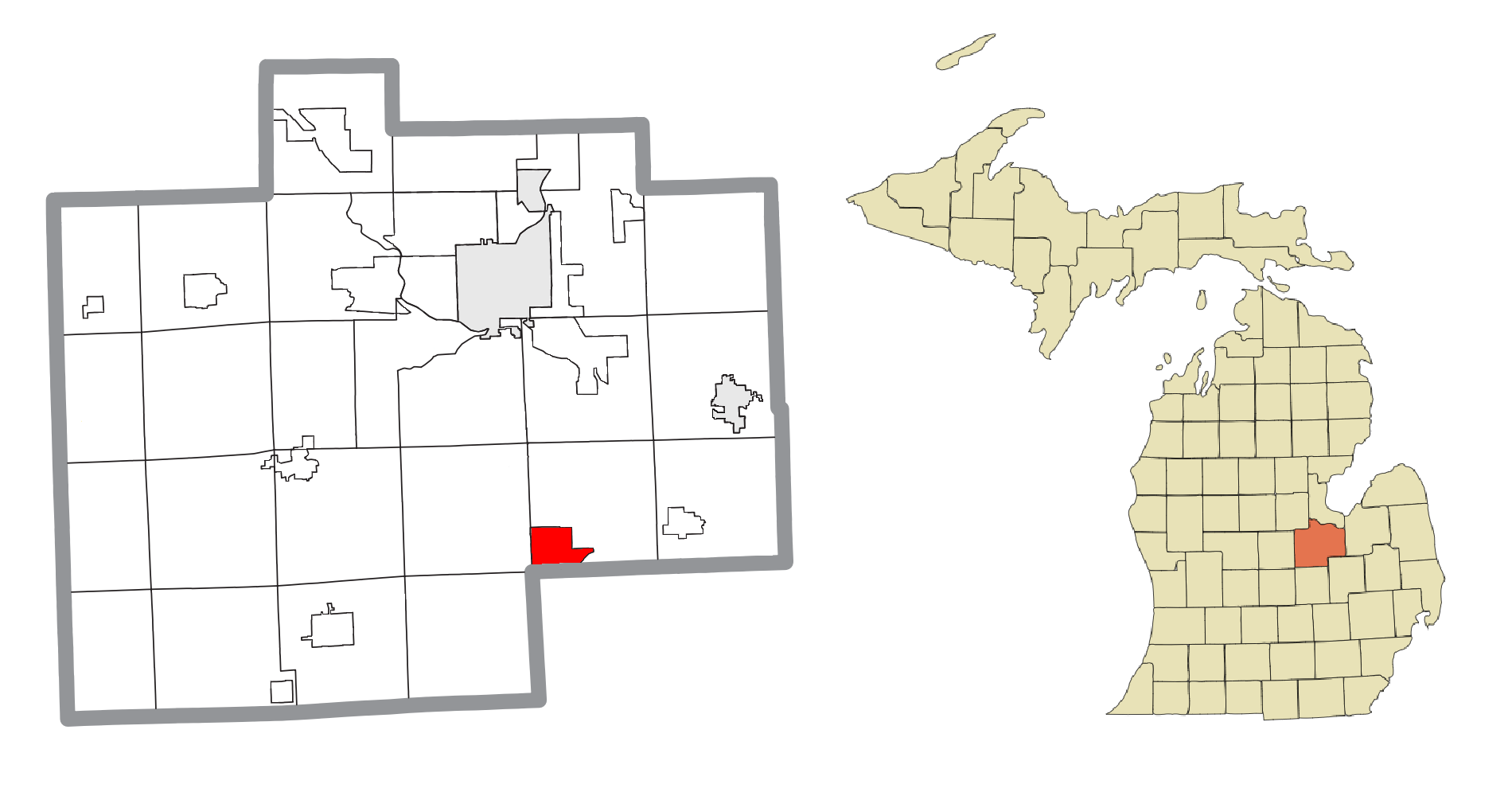
- Location within Saginaw County

- Location within the state of Michigan Burt (the United States)
- Coordinates: 43°14′17″N 83°54′10″W
- Country: United States
- State: Michigan
- County: Saginaw
- Township: Taymouth

Area
  - Total: 6.08 sq mi (15.74 km^{2})
  - Land: 6.03 sq mi (15.63 km^{2})
  - Water: 0.042 sq mi (0.11 km^{2})
- Elevation: 633 ft (193 m)

Population (2020)
  - Total: 1,194
  - Density: 197.8/sq mi (76.37/km^{2})
- Time zone: UTC-5 (Eastern (EST))
  - Summer (DST): UTC-4 (EDT)
- ZIP code(s): 48417
- Area code: 989
- FIPS code: 26-12000
- GNIS feature ID: 2393358

Burt is a census-designated place (CDP) and Unincorporated community for statistical purposes in Taymouth Township, Saginaw County in the U.S. state of Michigan. As of the 2020 census, Burt had a population of 1,194. Burt is also the name of a post office with ZIP code 48417, which includes the area of the CDP as well as portions of Taymouth Township to the north of the CDP and the eastern part of Albee Township and a small area of southeastern Spaulding Township. The town is named for Wellington R. Burt.

== Geography ==
According to the United States Census Bureau, the CDP has a total area of 4.5 square miles (12 km^{2}), all land.

== Demographics ==
Historical population
Census	Pop.	Note	%±
2020	1,194		—
U.S. Decennial Census

As of the census of 2000, there were 1,122 people, 394 households, and 327 families residing in the CDP. The population density was 247.4 inhabitants per square mile (95.5/km^{2}). There were 420 housing units at an average density of 92.6 per square mile (35.8/km^{2}). The racial makeup of the CDP was 93.67% White, 1.07% African American, 1.16% Native American, 0.27% Asian, 1.69% from other races, and 2.14% from two or more races. Hispanic or Latino of any race were 4.63% of the population.

There were 394 households, out of which 41.4% had children under the age of 18 living with them, 68.8% were married couples living together, 8.4% had a female householder with no husband present, and 17.0% were non-families. 13.5% of all households were made up of individuals, and 6.1% had someone living alone who was 65 years of age or older. The average household size was 2.85 and the average family size was 3.09.

In the CDP, the population was spread out, with 29.3% under the age of 18, 7.6% from 18 to 24, 29.9% from 25 to 44, 25.1% from 45 to 64, and 8.0% who were 65 years of age or older. The median age was 35 years. For every 100 females, there were 105.1 males. For every 100 females age 18 and over, there were 99.2 males.

The median income for a household in the CDP was $47,250, and the median income for a family was $47,143. Males had a median income of $42,734 versus $21,719 for females. The per capita income for the CDP was $15,997. About 4.8% of families and 8.3% of the population were below the poverty line, including 11.9% of those under age 18 and 13.2% of those age 65 or over.

== Notable people ==
- Wellington R. Burt (1831-1919), industrial baron; once ranked the eighth wealthiest man in America; namesake of town.
