= David Jerome =

Governor of Michigan from 1881 to 1883

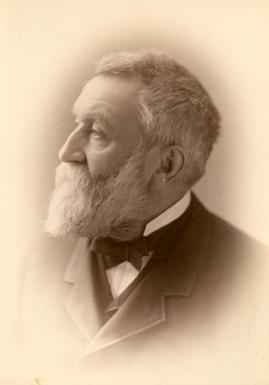

18th Governor of Michigan
- In office January 1, 1881 – January 1, 1883
- Lieutenant: Moreau S. Crosby
- Preceded by: Charles Croswell
- Succeeded by: Josiah Begole

Member of the Michigan Senate
- In office 1863–1868
- Preceded by: Daniel G. Wilder
- Succeeded by: Alfred B. Wood
- Constituency: 27th district (1863–1866); 26th district (1867–1868)

Personal details
- Born: November 17, 1829 Detroit, Michigan Territory
- Died: April 23, 1896 (aged 66) Watkins Glen, New York
- Party: Republican
- Spouse: Lucy Peck

David Howell Jerome (November 17, 1829 – April 23, 1896) was an American politician. He served as the 18th governor of Michigan (1881–1883); he was the first governor to be born in Michigan.

== Early life ==
He was born in Detroit to Horace and Elizabeth Rose (Hart) Jerome who had emigrated to Michigan from Trumansburg, New York in 1828. He was the last of nine children (four by his first wife, five by his second) born to his father, who died on March 30, 1831. Soon after his father's death, Jerome's mother returned with her children to her native New York, near Syracuse. In 1834, they returned to Michigan, to a farm in St. Clair County. As a boy he did farm work and excelled in school attending the St. Clair Academy, where he was allowed to remain until the age of sixteen. He also worked for a time hauling and rafting logs down the St. Clair River to Algonac.

In 1855, Jerome and a brother moved to Saginaw where he served as alderman. On June 15, 1859, Jerome married Lucy Peck. He enthusiastically helped raise a Civil War regiment in 1862, serving as the colonel of the 23rd Michigan Infantry, and was an active Union supporter throughout his subsequent state senate service.

As a reward for his service to the Union, he was elected a 3rd Class member of the Military Order of the Loyal Legion of the United States.

== Politics ==
Jerome, a Republican, was a merchant by profession. He was a member of the Michigan Senate from the 27th District 1863 to 1866 and from the 26th District 1867 to 1868, and was appointed Chairman of the Committee on State Affairs upon taking office. He also served as Governor Henry Crapo's military aide from 1865 to 1866, and was president of the State Military Board from 1865 to 1873. He was also an alternate delegate to the 1868 Republican National Convention, and, appointed by Governor John J. Bagley, a member of the Michigan state constitutional commission in 1873 from the 8th district, and was Chairman of the Committee on Finance. He served, as well, on the U.S. Board of Indian Commissioners from 1876 to 1881.

On November 2, 1880, Jerome was elected the 18th Governor of Michigan serving from January 1, 1881, to January 1, 1883, defeating Democrat Frederick M. Holloway. During his tenure, an immigration commissioner was named; the Traverse City State Hospital for the Insane was founded; the state's railroad system was advanced; and the Michigan School for the Blind was established in Lansing. He was defeated for re-election in 1882, by Democrat Josiah Begole, ending a record 28-year span of Republican Governors in Michigan.

== Retirement and death ==
Six years after leaving office, he was appointed and served on the Cherokee Commission, which attained land from the Indians to form the Oklahoma Territory. An Episcopalian, he died in Watkins Glen, New York and is interred at Oakwood Cemetery in Saginaw, Michigan.

Party political offices
Preceded by Charles Croswell	Republican nominee for Governor of Michigan; 1880, 1882	Succeeded by Russell A. Alger
Political offices
Preceded by Charles Croswell	Governor of Michigan; 1881–1883	Succeeded by Josiah Begole
