= Political party strength in Maine =

Politics in the US state of Maine

The following table indicates the party of elected officials in the U.S. state of Maine:

- Governor

The table also indicates the historical party composition in the:

- State Senate
- State House of Representatives
- State delegation to the U.S. Senate
- State delegation to the U.S. House of Representatives

For years in which a presidential election was held, the table indicates which party's nominees received the state's electoral votes.

== History ==
The Republican Party controlled the governorship from the American Civil War to 1932, with the Democratic Party only winning four times. The Greenback Party was active in Maine and its gubernatorial candidates had their vote totals rise from 520 votes in the 1876 election to 41,371 votes in the 1878 election. The Greenbacks aided in the election of Democratic gubernatorial nominees Alonzo Garcelon and Harris M. Plaisted. The Democratic Party did not control the state legislature between 1847 and 1911.

The Maine Republican Party supported Theodore Roosevelt during the 1912 Republican presidential primaries against President William Howard Taft. The Maine Progressive Party was founded by Roosevelt supporters on July 31, 1912, at a convention in Portland, Maine. The Republicans were weakened after losing members including Charles H. Hitchborn, who was the treasurer of the party, although Warren C. Philbrook, the chair of the party, remained. Woodrow Wilson won Maine in the presidential election while Roosevelt received more votes than Taft.

On April 5, 1916, the Progressives held their convention and nominated Edwin Lawrence for governor under the coniditon that they would follow the path of the national party. The national Progressive Party attempted to nominate Roosevelt for president against, but he declined and the party returned to the Republicans. The Maine Progressives withdrew their candidates and supported the Republicans. B. F. Lawrence, who ran for a seat in the Maine House of Representatives, was the only Progressive elected in 1916, but later joined the Republicans.

Robert M. La Follette, who ran as the Progressive presidential nominee in the 1924 election, told Gilbert E. Roe, who was running his campaign in the eastern United States, that the conditions for his campaigns were good in the eastern United States except for in Maine and Vermont. Republican nominee Calvin Coolidge received over 70% of the popular vote while La Follette only received six percent.

== Table ==
Year	Governor	State Legislature		United States Congress				Electoral votes
Year	Governor	State Senate	State House	U.S. Senator (Class I)	U.S. Senator (Class II)	U.S. House District 1	U.S. House District 2	Electoral votes
1820	William King (DR) (Note: Resigned to take appointment as a minister to negotiate a treaty with Spain.)	DR majority	DR majority	John Holmes (DR)	John Chandler (DR)	Joseph Dane (F) (Note: Elected at-large on a general ticket.)		James Monroe/ Daniel D. Tompkins (DR) ✓
1821	William King (DR)	DR majority	DR majority	John Holmes (DR)	John Chandler (DR)	Joseph Dane (F)		James Monroe/ Daniel D. Tompkins (DR) ✓
1821	William D. Williamson (DR) (Note: As president of the state Senate, filled unexpired term.) (Note: Resigned to take an elected seat in the United States House of Representatives.)	DR majority	DR majority	John Holmes (DR)	John Chandler (DR)	5DR, 2F		James Monroe/ Daniel D. Tompkins (DR) ✓
1821	Benjamin Ames (DR) (Note: As speaker of the state House, filled unexpired term.) (Note: Resigned.)	DR majority	DR majority	John Holmes (DR)	John Chandler (DR)	5DR, 2F		James Monroe/ Daniel D. Tompkins (DR) ✓
1822	Daniel Rose (DR)	DR majority	DR majority	John Holmes (DR)	John Chandler (DR)	6DR, 1F		James Monroe/ Daniel D. Tompkins (DR) ✓
1822	Albion Parris (DR)	DR majority	DR majority	John Holmes (DR)	John Chandler (DR)	6DR, 1F		James Monroe/ Daniel D. Tompkins (DR) ✓
1823	Albion Parris (DR)	DR majority	DR majority	John Holmes (DR)	John Chandler (DR)	6DR, 1F		James Monroe/ Daniel D. Tompkins (DR) ✓
1824	Albion Parris (DR)	DR majority	NR majority	John Holmes (DR)	John Chandler (DR)	6DR, 1F		John Quincy Adams/ John C. Calhoun (DR) ✓
1825	Albion Parris (DR)	DR majority	DR majority	John Holmes (NR)	John Chandler (J)	6NR, 1J		John Quincy Adams/ John C. Calhoun (DR) ✓
1826	Albion Parris (DR)	DR majority	DR majority	John Holmes (NR)	John Chandler (J)	6NR, 1J		John Quincy Adams/ John C. Calhoun (DR) ✓
1827	Enoch Lincoln (DR) (Note: Died in office.)	DR majority	DR majority	Albion Parris (J)	John Chandler (J)	4NR, 3J		John Quincy Adams/ John C. Calhoun (DR) ✓
1828	Enoch Lincoln (DR)	DR majority	DR majority	Albion Parris (J)	John Chandler (J)	4NR, 3J		John Quincy Adams/ Richard Rush (DR) ✗
1829	Enoch Lincoln (DR)	DR majority	NR majority	John Holmes (NR)	Peleg Sprague (NR)	4J, 3NR		John Quincy Adams/ Richard Rush (DR) ✗
1829	Nathan Cutler (D) (Note: As president of the state Senate, filled unexpired term until his Senate term expired.)	DR majority	NR majority	John Holmes (NR)	Peleg Sprague (NR)	4J, 3NR		John Quincy Adams/ Richard Rush (DR) ✗
1830	Joshua Hall (D)	12NR, 8DR	NR majority	John Holmes (NR)	Peleg Sprague (NR)	4J, 3NR		John Quincy Adams/ Richard Rush (DR) ✗
1830	Jonathan G. Hunton (NR)	12NR, 8DR	NR majority	John Holmes (NR)	Peleg Sprague (NR)	4J, 3NR		John Quincy Adams/ Richard Rush (DR) ✗
1831	Samuel E. Smith (D)	11DR, 9DR	86DR, 62NR, 1?	John Holmes (NR)	Peleg Sprague (NR)	6J, 1NR		John Quincy Adams/ Richard Rush (DR) ✗
1832	Samuel E. Smith (D)	21DR, 4NR	100DR, 58NR, 24?, 2 vac.	John Holmes (NR)	Peleg Sprague (NR)	6J, 1NR		Andrew Jackson/ Martin Van Buren (D) ✓
1833	Samuel E. Smith (D)	15DR, 10NR	97DR, 59NR, 30?	Ether Shepley (J)	Peleg Sprague (NR)	7J, 1NR		Andrew Jackson/ Martin Van Buren (D) ✓
1834	Robert P. Dunlap (D)	21DR, 3NR, 1A-M	79DR, 39NR, 63? (Note: A Democrat, Nathan Clifford, was elected as Speaker.)	Ether Shepley (J)	Peleg Sprague (NR)	7J, 1NR		Andrew Jackson/ Martin Van Buren (D) ✓
1835	Robert P. Dunlap (D)	18D, 7NR	94D, 66NR, 26?	Ether Shepley (J)	John Ruggles (J)	6J, 2NR		Andrew Jackson/ Martin Van Buren (D) ✓
1836	Robert P. Dunlap (D)	22D, 3NR	51D, 41NR, 94? (Note: A Democrat, Hannibal Hamlin, was elected as Speaker.)	Judah Dana (J)	John Ruggles (J)	6J, 2NR		Martin Van Buren/ Richard Mentor Johnson (D) ✓
1837	Robert P. Dunlap (D)	21D, 4W	108D, 54W, 24?	Reuel Williams (D)	John Ruggles (D)	6D, 2W		Martin Van Buren/ Richard Mentor Johnson (D) ✓
1838	Edward Kent (W) (Note: Won a close election, but Democrats challenged the election. He was finally declared the winner by the state Supreme Court and sworn in on January 19, 1838.)	14D, 11W	98W, 85D, 5?	Reuel Williams (D)	John Ruggles (D)	5D, 3W		Martin Van Buren/ Richard Mentor Johnson (D) ✓
1839	John Fairfield (D)	15D, 10W	107D, 73W, 9?. 1 vac.	Reuel Williams (D)	John Ruggles (D)	6D, 2W		Martin Van Buren/ Richard Mentor Johnson (D) ✓
1840	John Fairfield (D)	17D, 8W	123D, 63W, 5?	Reuel Williams (D)	John Ruggles (D)	6D, 2W		William Henry Harrison/ John Tyler (W) ✓
1841	Richard H. Vose (W)	18W, 7D	94W, 66D, 30? (Note: A Whig, Josiah S. Little, was elected as Speaker.)	Reuel Williams (D)	George Evans (W)	4D, 4W		William Henry Harrison/ John Tyler (W) ✓
1841	Edward Kent (W)	18W, 7D	94W, 66D, 30?	Reuel Williams (D)	George Evans (W)	4D, 4W		William Henry Harrison/ John Tyler (W) ✓
1842	John Fairfield (D) (Note: Resigned to take an elected seat in the United States Senate.)	27D, 4W	131D, 55W, 18?	Reuel Williams (D)	George Evans (W)	4D, 4W		William Henry Harrison/ John Tyler (W) ✓
1843	John Fairfield (D)	30D, 1W	55D, 18W, 78? (Note: A Democrat, David Dunn, was elected as Speaker.)	Reuel Williams (D)	George Evans (W)	5D, 2W		William Henry Harrison/ John Tyler (W) ✓
1843	Edward Kavanagh (D)	30D, 1W	55D, 18W, 78?	vacant	George Evans (W)	5D, 2W		William Henry Harrison/ John Tyler (W) ✓
1844	David Dunn (D)	28D, 3W	89D, 42W, 2Lty, 18?	John Fairfield (D)	George Evans (W)	5D, 2W		James K. Polk/ George M. Dallas (D) ✓
1844	John W. Dana (D)	28D, 3W	89D, 42W, 2Lty, 18?	John Fairfield (D)	George Evans (W)	5D, 2W		James K. Polk/ George M. Dallas (D) ✓
1844	Hugh J. Anderson (D)	28D, 3W	89D, 42W, 2Lty, 18?	John Fairfield (D)	George Evans (W)	5D, 2W		James K. Polk/ George M. Dallas (D) ✓
1845	Hugh J. Anderson (D)	28D, 3W	85D, 49W, 17?	John Fairfield (D)	George Evans (W)	6D, 1W		James K. Polk/ George M. Dallas (D) ✓
1846	Hugh J. Anderson (D)	27D, 4W	85D, 66W	John Fairfield (D)	George Evans (W)	6D, 1W		James K. Polk/ George M. Dallas (D) ✓
1847	Hugh J. Anderson (D)	27D, 4W	78D, 66W, 6Lty, 1I	John Fairfield (D)	James W. Bradbury (D)	6D, 1W		James K. Polk/ George M. Dallas (D) ✓
1847	John W. Dana (D)	27D, 4W	78D, 66W, 6Lty, 1I	John Fairfield (D)	James W. Bradbury (D)	6D, 1W		James K. Polk/ George M. Dallas (D) ✓
1848	John W. Dana (D)	27D, 4W	102D, 49W	Wyman B. S. Moor (D)	James W. Bradbury (D)	6D, 1W		Lewis Cass/ William Orlando Butler (D) ✗
1848	John W. Dana (D)	27D, 4W	102D, 49W	Hannibal Hamlin (D) (Note: Resigned to take an elected seat as Governor.)	James W. Bradbury (D)	6D, 1W		Lewis Cass/ William Orlando Butler (D) ✗
1849	John W. Dana (D)	20D, 11W	85D, 66W	Hannibal Hamlin (D)	James W. Bradbury (D)	5D, 2W		Lewis Cass/ William Orlando Butler (D) ✗
1850	John W. Dana (D)	20D, 11W	88D, 63R	Hannibal Hamlin (D)	James W. Bradbury (D)	5D, 2W		Lewis Cass/ William Orlando Butler (D) ✗
1850	John Hubbard (D)	20D, 11W	88D, 63R	Hannibal Hamlin (D)	James W. Bradbury (D)	5D, 2W		Lewis Cass/ William Orlando Butler (D) ✗
1851	John Hubbard (D)	26D, 4W, 1FS (Note: Due to a constitutional change in when elected officials took office, legislators elected in 1850 had a two-year term.)	93D, 50W, 8FS	Hannibal Hamlin (D)	James W. Bradbury (D)	5D, 2W		Lewis Cass/ William Orlando Butler (D) ✗
1852	John Hubbard (D)	26D, 4W, 1FS	93D, 50W, 8FS	Hannibal Hamlin (D)	James W. Bradbury (D)	4D, 3W		Franklin Pierce/ William R. King (D) ✓
1853	William G. Crosby (W)	22W, 9D	84D, 62W, 4FS, 1?	Hannibal Hamlin (D)	vacant	3D, 3W		Franklin Pierce/ William R. King (D) ✓
1854	William G. Crosby (W)	17W, 14D	76D, 66W, 9FS	Hannibal Hamlin (D)	William P. Fessenden (W)	3D, 3W		Franklin Pierce/ William R. King (D) ✓
1855	Anson Morrill (R)	16W, 10D, 5FS	83D, 44W, 23FS, 1? (Note: A coalition of Whigs, Free Soilers, and Morrill Democrats elected Noah Smith Jr., a Whig, as Speaker, and organized the chamber.)	Hannibal Hamlin (D)	William P. Fessenden (W)	3O, 2R, 1D		Franklin Pierce/ William R. King (D) ✓
1856	Samuel Wells (D)	20D, 9W, 2R	68D, 61R, 22W (Note: A coalition of Republicans and Whigs elected Sidney Perham, a Republican, as Speaker, and organized the chamber.)	Hannibal Hamlin (D)	William P. Fessenden (W)	3O, 2R, 1D		John C. Frémont/ William L. Dayton (R) ✗
1857	Hannibal Hamlin (R)	30R, 1D	125R, 26D (Note: A Democrat, Josiah S. Little, was elected as a minority-party Speaker.)	Amos Nourse (R)	William P. Fessenden (R)	6R		John C. Frémont/ William L. Dayton (R) ✗
1857	Joseph H. Williams (R)	30R, 1D	125R, 26D	Hannibal Hamlin (R) (Note: Resigned to become Vice President of the United States.)	William P. Fessenden (R)	6R		John C. Frémont/ William L. Dayton (R) ✗
1858	Lot M. Morrill (R)	30R, 1D	117R, 34D (Note: A Democrat, Charles A. Spofford, was elected as a minority-party Speaker.)	Hannibal Hamlin (R)	William P. Fessenden (R)	6R		John C. Frémont/ William L. Dayton (R) ✗
1859	Lot M. Morrill (R)	30R, 1D	103R, 48D	Hannibal Hamlin (R)	William P. Fessenden (R)	6R		John C. Frémont/ William L. Dayton (R) ✗
1860	Lot M. Morrill (R)	30R, 1D	119R, 32D	Hannibal Hamlin (R)	William P. Fessenden (R)	6R		Abraham Lincoln/ Hannibal Hamlin (R) ✓
1861	Israel Washburn Jr. (R)	31R	128R, 23D	Lot M. Morrill (R)	William P. Fessenden (R)	6R		Abraham Lincoln/ Hannibal Hamlin (R) ✓
1862	Israel Washburn Jr. (R)	26R, 5D	123R, 28D	Lot M. Morrill (R)	William P. Fessenden (R)	6R		Abraham Lincoln/ Hannibal Hamlin (R) ✓
1863	Abner Coburn (R)	25R, 6D	107R, 44D	Lot M. Morrill (R)	William P. Fessenden (R)	4R, 1D		Abraham Lincoln/ Hannibal Hamlin (R) ✓
1864	Samuel Cony (R)	30R, 1D	120R, 31D	Lot M. Morrill (R)	William P. Fessenden (R)	4R, 1D		Abraham Lincoln/ Andrew Johnson (NU) ✓
1864	Samuel Cony (R)	30R, 1D	120R, 31D	Lot M. Morrill (R)	Nathan A. Farwell (R)	4R, 1D		Abraham Lincoln/ Andrew Johnson (NU) ✓
1865	Samuel Cony (R)	28R, 3D	129R, 22D	Lot M. Morrill (R)	William P. Fessenden (R)	5R		Abraham Lincoln/ Andrew Johnson (NU) ✓
1866	Samuel Cony (R)	31R	136R, 15D	Lot M. Morrill (R)	William P. Fessenden (R)	5R		Abraham Lincoln/ Andrew Johnson (NU) ✓
1867	Joshua Chamberlain (R)	31R	138R, 13D	Lot M. Morrill (R)	William P. Fessenden (R)	5R		Abraham Lincoln/ Andrew Johnson (NU) ✓
1868	Joshua Chamberlain (R)	28R, 3D	105R, 46D	Lot M. Morrill (R)	William P. Fessenden (R)	5R		Ulysses S. Grant/ Schuyler Colfax (R) ✓
1869	Joshua Chamberlain (R)	29R, 2D	123R, 28D	Hannibal Hamlin (R)	William P. Fessenden (R)	5R		Ulysses S. Grant/ Schuyler Colfax (R) ✓
1870	Joshua Chamberlain (R)	28R, 3D	117R, 34D	Hannibal Hamlin (R)	Lot M. Morrill (R)	5R		Ulysses S. Grant/ Schuyler Colfax (R) ✓
1871	Sidney Perham (R)	28R, 3D	113R, 38D	Hannibal Hamlin (R)	Lot M. Morrill (R)	5R		Ulysses S. Grant/ Schuyler Colfax (R) ✓
1872	Sidney Perham (R)	28R, 3D	112R, 39D	Hannibal Hamlin (R)	Lot M. Morrill (R)	5R		Ulysses S. Grant/ Henry Wilson (R) ✓
1873	Sidney Perham (R)	30R, 1LR	128R, 19D, 2LR, 2I	Hannibal Hamlin (R)	Lot M. Morrill (R)	5R		Ulysses S. Grant/ Henry Wilson (R) ✓
1874	Nelson Dingley Jr. (R)	30R, 1LR	103R, 41D, 7I	Hannibal Hamlin (R)	Lot M. Morrill (R)	5R		Ulysses S. Grant/ Henry Wilson (R) ✓
1875	Nelson Dingley Jr. (R)	28R, 3D	89R, 55D, 7I	Hannibal Hamlin (R)	Lot M. Morrill (R)	5R		Ulysses S. Grant/ Henry Wilson (R) ✓
1876	Seldon Connor (R)	20R, 11D	85R, 63D, 3I	Hannibal Hamlin (R)	Lot M. Morrill (R)	5R		Rutherford B. Hayes/ William A. Wheeler (R) ✓
1877	Seldon Connor (R)	29R, 2D	120R, 30D, 1I	Hannibal Hamlin (R)	James G. Blaine (R)	5R		Rutherford B. Hayes/ William A. Wheeler (R) ✓
1878	Seldon Connor (R)	28R, 3D	99R, 47D, 3I, 2GB	Hannibal Hamlin (R)	James G. Blaine (R)	5R		Rutherford B. Hayes/ William A. Wheeler (R) ✓
1879	Alonzo Garcelon (D)	20R, 10GB, 1D	65R, 57GB, 27D, 2I (Note: A coalition of Democrats, Greenbacks, and Independents supported Melvin P. Frank, a Democrat, as Speaker and organized the House.)	Hannibal Hamlin (R)	James G. Blaine (R)	3R, 2GB		Rutherford B. Hayes/ William A. Wheeler (R) ✓
1880	Daniel F. Davis (R)	19R, 11GB, 1D	90R, 50GB, 11D	Hannibal Hamlin (R)	James G. Blaine (R)	3R, 2GB		James A. Garfield/ Chester A. Arthur (R) ✓
1881	Harris M. Plaisted (GB)	23R, 6GB, 2D	84R, 40GB, 27D	Eugene Hale (R)	William P. Frye (R)	3R, 2GB		James A. Garfield/ Chester A. Arthur (R) ✓
1882	Harris M. Plaisted (GB)	23R, 6GB, 2D	84R, 40GB, 27D	Eugene Hale (R)	William P. Frye (R)	3R, 2GB		James A. Garfield/ Chester A. Arthur (R) ✓
1883	Frederick Robie (R)	28R, 3D	108R, 43D	Eugene Hale (R)	William P. Frye (R)	4R		James A. Garfield/ Chester A. Arthur (R) ✓
1884	Frederick Robie (R)	28R, 3D	108R, 43D	Eugene Hale (R)	William P. Frye (R)	4R		James G. Blaine/ John A. Logan (R) ✗
1885	Frederick Robie (R)	31R	115R, 34D, 2GB	Eugene Hale (R)	William P. Frye (R)	4R		James G. Blaine/ John A. Logan (R) ✗
1886	Frederick Robie (R)	31R	115R, 34D, 2GB	Eugene Hale (R)	William P. Frye (R)	4R		James G. Blaine/ John A. Logan (R) ✗
1887	Joseph R. Bodwell (R)	27R, 4D	122R, 29D	Eugene Hale (R)	William P. Frye (R)	4R		James G. Blaine/ John A. Logan (R) ✗
1887	Sebastian Streeter Marble (R)	27R, 4D	122R, 29D	Eugene Hale (R)	William P. Frye (R)	4R		James G. Blaine/ John A. Logan (R) ✗
1888	Sebastian Streeter Marble (R)	27R, 4D	122R, 29D	Eugene Hale (R)	William P. Frye (R)	4R		Benjamin Harrison/ Levi P. Morton (R) ✓
1889	Edwin C. Burleigh (R)	31R	125R, 26D	Eugene Hale (R)	William P. Frye (R)	4R		Benjamin Harrison/ Levi P. Morton (R) ✓
1890	Edwin C. Burleigh (R)	31R	125R, 26D	Eugene Hale (R)	William P. Frye (R)	4R		Benjamin Harrison/ Levi P. Morton (R) ✓
1891	Edwin C. Burleigh (R)	27R, 4D	110R, 41D	Eugene Hale (R)	William P. Frye (R)	4R		Benjamin Harrison/ Levi P. Morton (R) ✓
1892	Edwin C. Burleigh (R)	27R, 4D	110R, 41D	Eugene Hale (R)	William P. Frye (R)	4R		Benjamin Harrison/ Whitelaw Reid (R) ✗
1893	Henry B. Cleaves (R)	30R, 1D	107R, 44D	Eugene Hale (R)	William P. Frye (R)	4R		Benjamin Harrison/ Whitelaw Reid (R) ✗
1894	Henry B. Cleaves (R)	30R, 1D	107R, 44D	Eugene Hale (R)	William P. Frye (R)	4R		Benjamin Harrison/ Whitelaw Reid (R) ✗
1895	Henry B. Cleaves (R)	31R	146R, 5D	Eugene Hale (R)	William P. Frye (R)	4R		Benjamin Harrison/ Whitelaw Reid (R) ✗
1896	Henry B. Cleaves (R)	31R	146R, 5D	Eugene Hale (R)	William P. Frye (R)	4R		William McKinley/ Garret Hobart (R) ✓
1897	Llewellyn Powers (R)	31R	145R, 6D	Eugene Hale (R)	William P. Frye (R)	4R		William McKinley/ Garret Hobart (R) ✓
1898	Llewellyn Powers (R)	31R	145R, 6D	Eugene Hale (R)	William P. Frye (R)	4R		William McKinley/ Garret Hobart (R) ✓
1899	Llewellyn Powers (R)	31R	126R, 25D	Eugene Hale (R)	William P. Frye (R)	4R		William McKinley/ Garret Hobart (R) ✓
1900	Llewellyn Powers (R)	31R	126R, 25D	Eugene Hale (R)	William P. Frye (R)	4R		William McKinley/ Theodore Roosevelt (R) ✓
1901	John Fremont Hill (R)	30R, 1D	132R, 19D	Eugene Hale (R)	William P. Frye (R)	4R		William McKinley/ Theodore Roosevelt (R) ✓
1902	John Fremont Hill (R)	30R, 1D	132R, 19D	Eugene Hale (R)	William P. Frye (R)	4R		William McKinley/ Theodore Roosevelt (R) ✓
1903	John Fremont Hill (R)	30R, 1D	128R, 23D	Eugene Hale (R)	William P. Frye (R)	4R		William McKinley/ Theodore Roosevelt (R) ✓
1904	John Fremont Hill (R)	30R, 1D	128R, 23D	Eugene Hale (R)	William P. Frye (R)	4R		Theodore Roosevelt/ Charles W. Fairbanks ✓
1905	William T. Cobb (R)	27R, 4D	126R, 25D	Eugene Hale (R)	William P. Frye (R)	4R		Theodore Roosevelt/ Charles W. Fairbanks ✓
1906	William T. Cobb (R)	27R, 4D	126R, 25D	Eugene Hale (R)	William P. Frye (R)	4R		Theodore Roosevelt/ Charles W. Fairbanks ✓
1907	William T. Cobb (R)	23R, 8D	88R, 63D	Eugene Hale (R)	William P. Frye (R)	4R		Theodore Roosevelt/ Charles W. Fairbanks ✓
1908	William T. Cobb (R)	23R, 8D	88R, 63D	Eugene Hale (R)	William P. Frye (R)	4R		William Howard Taft/ James S. Sherman (R) ✓
1909	Bert M. Fernald (R)	23R, 8D	100R, 51D	Eugene Hale (R)	William P. Frye (R)	4R		William Howard Taft/ James S. Sherman (R) ✓
1910	Bert M. Fernald (R)	23R, 8D	100R, 51D	Eugene Hale (R)	William P. Frye (R)	4R		William Howard Taft/ James S. Sherman (R) ✓
1911	Frederick W. Plaisted (D)	22D, 9R	86D, 65R	Charles F. Johnson (D)	William P. Frye (R)	2R, 2D		William Howard Taft/ James S. Sherman (R) ✓
1911	Frederick W. Plaisted (D)	22D, 9R	86D, 65R	Charles F. Johnson (D)	Obadiah Gardner (D)	2R, 2D		William Howard Taft/ James S. Sherman (R) ✓
1912	Frederick W. Plaisted (D)	22D, 9R	86D, 65R	Charles F. Johnson (D)	Obadiah Gardner (D)	2R, 2D		Woodrow Wilson/ Thomas R. Marshall (D) ✓
1913	William T. Haines (R)	21R, 10D	79R, 72D	Charles F. Johnson (D)	Edwin C. Burleigh (R)	3R, 1D		Woodrow Wilson/ Thomas R. Marshall (D) ✓
1914	William T. Haines (R)	21R, 10D	79R, 72D	Charles F. Johnson (D)	Edwin C. Burleigh (R)	3R, 1D		Woodrow Wilson/ Thomas R. Marshall (D) ✓
1915	Oakley C. Curtis (D)	17R, 14D	78D, 69R, 4Prog	Charles F. Johnson (D)	Edwin C. Burleigh (R)	3R, 1D		Woodrow Wilson/ Thomas R. Marshall (D) ✓
1916	Oakley C. Curtis (D)	17R, 14D	78D, 69R, 4Prog	Charles F. Johnson (D)	Edwin C. Burleigh (R)	3R, 1D		Charles Evans Hughes/ Charles W. Fairbanks (R) ✗
1916	Oakley C. Curtis (D)	17R, 14D	78D, 69R, 4Prog	Charles F. Johnson (D)	vacant	3R, 1D		Charles Evans Hughes/ Charles W. Fairbanks (R) ✗
1916	Oakley C. Curtis (D)	17R, 14D	78D, 69R, 4Prog	Charles F. Johnson (D)	Bert M. Fernald (R)	3R, 1D		Charles Evans Hughes/ Charles W. Fairbanks (R) ✗
1917	Carl Milliken (R)	28R, 3D	105R, 46D	Frederick Hale (R)	Bert M. Fernald (R)	4R		Charles Evans Hughes/ Charles W. Fairbanks (R) ✗
1918	Carl Milliken (R)	28R, 3D	105R, 46D	Frederick Hale (R)	Bert M. Fernald (R)	4R		Charles Evans Hughes/ Charles W. Fairbanks (R) ✗
1919	Carl Milliken (R)	29R, 2D	110R, 41D	Frederick Hale (R)	Bert M. Fernald (R)	4R		Charles Evans Hughes/ Charles W. Fairbanks (R) ✗
1920	Carl Milliken (R)	29R, 2D	110R, 41D	Frederick Hale (R)	Bert M. Fernald (R)	4R		Warren G. Harding/ Calvin Coolidge (R) ✓
1921	Frederic Hale Parkhurst (R)	31R	135R, 16D	Frederick Hale (R)	Bert M. Fernald (R)	4R		Warren G. Harding/ Calvin Coolidge (R) ✓
1921	Percival P. Baxter (R) (Note: As president of the senate, filled unexpired term, and was later elected in his own right.)	31R	135R, 16D	Frederick Hale (R)	Bert M. Fernald (R)	4R		Warren G. Harding/ Calvin Coolidge (R) ✓
1922	Percival P. Baxter (R)	31R	135R, 16D	Frederick Hale (R)	Bert M. Fernald (R)	4R		Warren G. Harding/ Calvin Coolidge (R) ✓
1923	Percival P. Baxter (R)	28R, 3D	116R, 35D	Frederick Hale (R)	Bert M. Fernald (R)	4R		Warren G. Harding/ Calvin Coolidge (R) ✓
1924	Percival P. Baxter (R)	28R, 3D	116R, 35D	Frederick Hale (R)	Bert M. Fernald (R)	4R		Calvin Coolidge/ Charles G. Dawes (R) ✓
1925	Owen Brewster (R)	30R, 1D	122R, 29D	Frederick Hale (R)	Bert M. Fernald (R)	4R		Calvin Coolidge/ Charles G. Dawes (R) ✓
1926	Owen Brewster (R)	30R, 1D	122R, 29D	Frederick Hale (R)	Bert M. Fernald (R)	4R		Calvin Coolidge/ Charles G. Dawes (R) ✓
1926	Owen Brewster (R)	30R, 1D	122R, 29D	Frederick Hale (R)	vacant	4R		Calvin Coolidge/ Charles G. Dawes (R) ✓
1926	Owen Brewster (R)	30R, 1D	122R, 29D	Frederick Hale (R)	Arthur R. Gould (R)	4R		Calvin Coolidge/ Charles G. Dawes (R) ✓
1927	Owen Brewster (R)	30R, 1D	129R, 22D	Frederick Hale (R)	Arthur R. Gould (R)	4R		Calvin Coolidge/ Charles G. Dawes (R) ✓
1928	Owen Brewster (R)	30R, 1D	129R, 22D	Frederick Hale (R)	Arthur R. Gould (R)	4R		Herbert Hoover/ Charles Curtis (R) ✓
1929	William Tudor Gardiner (R)	31R	135R, 16D	Frederick Hale (R)	Arthur R. Gould (R)	4R		Herbert Hoover/ Charles Curtis (R) ✓
1930	William Tudor Gardiner (R)	31R	135R, 16D	Frederick Hale (R)	Arthur R. Gould (R)	4R		Herbert Hoover/ Charles Curtis (R) ✓
1931	William Tudor Gardiner (R)	31R	120R, 31D	Frederick Hale (R)	Wallace H. White (R)	4R		Herbert Hoover/ Charles Curtis (R) ✓
1932	William Tudor Gardiner (R)	31R	120R, 31D	Frederick Hale (R)	Wallace H. White (R)	4R		Herbert Hoover/ Charles Curtis (R) ✗
1933	Louis J. Brann (D)	26R, 7D	93R, 58D	Frederick Hale (R)	Wallace H. White (R)	2D, 1R		Herbert Hoover/ Charles Curtis (R) ✗
1934	Louis J. Brann (D)	26R, 7D	93R, 58D	Frederick Hale (R)	Wallace H. White (R)	2D, 1R		Herbert Hoover/ Charles Curtis (R) ✗
1935	Louis J. Brann (D)	22R, 11D	96R, 55D	Frederick Hale (R)	Wallace H. White (R)	2D, 1R		Herbert Hoover/ Charles Curtis (R) ✗
1936	Louis J. Brann (D)	22R, 11D	96R, 55D	Frederick Hale (R)	Wallace H. White (R)	2D, 1R		Alf Landon/ Frank Knox (R) ✗
1937	Lewis O. Barrows (R)	29R, 4D	124R, 27D	Frederick Hale (R)	Wallace H. White (R)	3R		Alf Landon/ Frank Knox (R) ✗
1938	Lewis O. Barrows (R)	29R, 4D	124R, 27D	Frederick Hale (R)	Wallace H. White (R)	3R		Alf Landon/ Frank Knox (R) ✗
1939	Lewis O. Barrows (R)	31R, 2D	124R, 27D	Frederick Hale (R)	Wallace H. White (R)	3R		Alf Landon/ Frank Knox (R) ✗
1940	Lewis O. Barrows (R)	31R, 2D	124R, 27D	Frederick Hale (R)	Wallace H. White (R)	3R		Wendell Willkie/ Charles L. McNary (R) ✗
1941	Sumner Sewall (R)	31R, 2D	128R, 23D	Owen Brewster (R)	Wallace H. White (R)	3R		Wendell Willkie/ Charles L. McNary (R) ✗
1942	Sumner Sewall (R)	31R, 2D	128R, 23D	Owen Brewster (R)	Wallace H. White (R)	3R		Wendell Willkie/ Charles L. McNary (R) ✗
1943	Sumner Sewall (R)	32R, 1D	136R, 15D	Owen Brewster (R)	Wallace H. White (R)	3R		Wendell Willkie/ Charles L. McNary (R) ✗
1944	Sumner Sewall (R)	32R, 1D	136R, 15D	Owen Brewster (R)	Wallace H. White (R)	3R		Thomas E. Dewey/ John W. Bricker (R) ✗
1945	Horace Hildreth (R)	31R, 2D	136R, 15D	Owen Brewster (R)	Wallace H. White (R)	3R		Thomas E. Dewey/ John W. Bricker (R) ✗
1946	Horace Hildreth (R)	31R, 2D	136R, 15D	Owen Brewster (R)	Wallace H. White (R)	3R		Thomas E. Dewey/ John W. Bricker (R) ✗
1947	Horace Hildreth (R)	30R, 3D	126R, 25D	Owen Brewster (R)	Wallace H. White (R)	3R		Thomas E. Dewey/ John W. Bricker (R) ✗
1948	Horace Hildreth (R)	30R, 3D	126R, 25D	Owen Brewster (R)	Wallace H. White (R)	3R		Thomas E. Dewey/ Earl Warren (R) ✗
1949	Frederick G. Payne (R)	28R, 5D	126R, 25D	Owen Brewster (R)	Margaret Chase Smith (R)	3R		Thomas E. Dewey/ Earl Warren (R) ✗
1950	Frederick G. Payne (R)	28R, 5D	126R, 25D	Owen Brewster (R)	Margaret Chase Smith (R)	3R		Thomas E. Dewey/ Earl Warren (R) ✗
1951	Frederick G. Payne (R)	31R, 2D	126R, 24D, 1I	Owen Brewster (R)	Margaret Chase Smith (R)	3R		Thomas E. Dewey/ Earl Warren (R) ✗
1952	Burton M. Cross (R)	31R, 2D	126R, 24D, 1I	Owen Brewster (R)	Margaret Chase Smith (R)	3R		Dwight D. Eisenhower/ Richard Nixon (R) ✓
1953	Nathaniel M. Haskell (R)	31R, 2D	127R, 24D	Frederick G. Payne (R)	Margaret Chase Smith (R)	3R		Dwight D. Eisenhower/ Richard Nixon (R) ✓
1954	Burton M. Cross (R)	31R, 2D	127R, 24D	Frederick G. Payne (R)	Margaret Chase Smith (R)	3R		Dwight D. Eisenhower/ Richard Nixon (R) ✓
1955	Edmund Muskie (D)	27R, 6D	119R, 32D	Frederick G. Payne (R)	Margaret Chase Smith (R)	3R		Dwight D. Eisenhower/ Richard Nixon (R) ✓
1956	Edmund Muskie (D)	27R, 6D	119R, 32D	Frederick G. Payne (R)	Margaret Chase Smith (R)	3R		Dwight D. Eisenhower/ Richard Nixon (R) ✓
1957	Edmund Muskie (D)	25R, 8D	100R, 51D	Frederick G. Payne (R)	Margaret Chase Smith (R)	2R, 1D		Dwight D. Eisenhower/ Richard Nixon (R) ✓
1958	Edmund Muskie (D)	25R, 8D	100R, 51D	Frederick G. Payne (R)	Margaret Chase Smith (R)	2R, 1D		Dwight D. Eisenhower/ Richard Nixon (R) ✓
1959	Clinton Clauson (D)	21R, 12D	94R, 57D	Edmund Muskie (D)	Margaret Chase Smith (R)	2D, 1R		Dwight D. Eisenhower/ Richard Nixon (R) ✓
1960	John H. Reed (R)	21R, 12D	94R, 57D	Edmund Muskie (D)	Margaret Chase Smith (R)	2D, 1R		Richard Nixon/ Henry Cabot Lodge Jr. (R) ✗
1961	John H. Reed (R)	30R, 3D	113R, 38D	Edmund Muskie (D)	Margaret Chase Smith (R)	3R		Richard Nixon/ Henry Cabot Lodge Jr. (R) ✗
1962	John H. Reed (R)	30R, 3D	113R, 38D	Edmund Muskie (D)	Margaret Chase Smith (R)	3R		Richard Nixon/ Henry Cabot Lodge Jr. (R) ✗
1963	John H. Reed (R)	29R, 5D	110R, 41D	Edmund Muskie (D)	Margaret Chase Smith (R)	Stanley R. Tupper (R)	Clifford McIntire (R)	Richard Nixon/ Henry Cabot Lodge Jr. (R) ✗
1964	John H. Reed (R)	29R, 5D	110R, 41D	Edmund Muskie (D)	Margaret Chase Smith (R)	Stanley R. Tupper (R)	Clifford McIntire (R)	Lyndon B. Johnson/ Hubert Humphrey (D) ✓
1965	John H. Reed (R)	29D, 5R	80D, 71R	Edmund Muskie (D)	Margaret Chase Smith (R)	Stanley R. Tupper (R)	William Hathaway (D)	Lyndon B. Johnson/ Hubert Humphrey (D) ✓
1966	John H. Reed (R)	29D, 5R	80D, 71R	Edmund Muskie (D)	Margaret Chase Smith (R)	Stanley R. Tupper (R)	William Hathaway (D)	Lyndon B. Johnson/ Hubert Humphrey (D) ✓
1967	Kenneth M. Curtis (D)	24R, 10D	95R, 56D	Edmund Muskie (D)	Margaret Chase Smith (R)	Peter Kyros (D)	William Hathaway (D)	Lyndon B. Johnson/ Hubert Humphrey (D) ✓
1968	Kenneth M. Curtis (D)	24R, 10D	95R, 56D	Edmund Muskie (D)	Margaret Chase Smith (R)	Peter Kyros (D)	William Hathaway (D)	Hubert Humphrey/ Edmund Muskie (D) ✗
1969	Kenneth M. Curtis (D)	18R, 14D	85R, 66D	Edmund Muskie (D)	Margaret Chase Smith (R)	Peter Kyros (D)	William Hathaway (D)	Hubert Humphrey/ Edmund Muskie (D) ✗
1970	Kenneth M. Curtis (D)	18R, 14D	85R, 66D	Edmund Muskie (D)	Margaret Chase Smith (R)	Peter Kyros (D)	William Hathaway (D)	Hubert Humphrey/ Edmund Muskie (D) ✗
1971	Kenneth M. Curtis (D)	18R, 14D	80R, 71D	Edmund Muskie (D)	Margaret Chase Smith (R)	Peter Kyros (D)	William Hathaway (D)	Hubert Humphrey/ Edmund Muskie (D) ✗
1972	Kenneth M. Curtis (D)	18R, 14D	80R, 71D	Edmund Muskie (D)	Margaret Chase Smith (R)	Peter Kyros (D)	William Hathaway (D)	Richard Nixon/ Spiro Agnew (R) ✓
1973	Kenneth M. Curtis (D)	22R, 11D	79R, 72D	Edmund Muskie (D)	William Hathaway (D)	Peter Kyros (D)	William Cohen (R)	Richard Nixon/ Spiro Agnew (R) ✓
1974	Kenneth M. Curtis (D)	22R, 11D	79R, 72D	Edmund Muskie (D)	William Hathaway (D)	Peter Kyros (D)	William Cohen (R)	Richard Nixon/ Spiro Agnew (R) ✓
1975	James B. Longley (I)	19R, 14D	91D, 59R, 1I	Edmund Muskie (D)	William Hathaway (D)	David F. Emery (R)	William Cohen (R)	Richard Nixon/ Spiro Agnew (R) ✓
1976	James B. Longley (I)	19R, 14D	91D, 59R, 1I	Edmund Muskie (D)	William Hathaway (D)	David F. Emery (R)	William Cohen (R)	Gerald Ford/ Bob Dole (R) ✗
1977	James B. Longley (I)	21R, 12D	89D, 62R	Edmund Muskie (D)	William Hathaway (D)	David F. Emery (R)	William Cohen (R)	Gerald Ford/ Bob Dole (R) ✗
1978	James B. Longley (I)	21R, 12D	89D, 62R	Edmund Muskie (D)	William Hathaway (D)	David F. Emery (R)	William Cohen (R)	Gerald Ford/ Bob Dole (R) ✗
1979	Joseph E. Brennan (D)	19R, 13D, 1I	77D, 73R, 1ID	Edmund Muskie (D)	William Cohen (R)	David F. Emery (R)	Olympia Snowe (R)	Gerald Ford/ Bob Dole (R) ✗
1980	Joseph E. Brennan (D)	19R, 13D, 1I	77D, 73R, 1ID	George J. Mitchell (D)	William Cohen (R)	David F. Emery (R)	Olympia Snowe (R)	Ronald Reagan/ George H. W. Bush (R) ✓
1981	Joseph E. Brennan (D)	17R, 16D	84D, 67R	George J. Mitchell (D)	William Cohen (R)	David F. Emery (R)	Olympia Snowe (R)	Ronald Reagan/ George H. W. Bush (R) ✓
1982	Joseph E. Brennan (D)	17R, 16D	84D, 67R	George J. Mitchell (D)	William Cohen (R)	David F. Emery (R)	Olympia Snowe (R)	Ronald Reagan/ George H. W. Bush (R) ✓
1983	Joseph E. Brennan (D)	23D, 10R	92D, 59R	George J. Mitchell (D)	William Cohen (R)	Jock McKernan (R)	Olympia Snowe (R)	Ronald Reagan/ George H. W. Bush (R) ✓
1984	Joseph E. Brennan (D)	23D, 10R	92D, 59R	George J. Mitchell (D)	William Cohen (R)	Jock McKernan (R)	Olympia Snowe (R)	Ronald Reagan/ George H. W. Bush (R) ✓
1985	Joseph E. Brennan (D)	24D, 11R	83D, 68R	George J. Mitchell (D)	William Cohen (R)	Jock McKernan (R)	Olympia Snowe (R)	Ronald Reagan/ George H. W. Bush (R) ✓
1986	Joseph E. Brennan (D)	24D, 11R	83D, 68R	George J. Mitchell (D)	William Cohen (R)	Jock McKernan (R)	Olympia Snowe (R)	Ronald Reagan/ George H. W. Bush (R) ✓
1987	Jock McKernan (R)	20D, 15R	86D, 65R	George J. Mitchell (D)	William Cohen (R)	Joseph E. Brennan (D)	Olympia Snowe (R)	Ronald Reagan/ George H. W. Bush (R) ✓
1988	Jock McKernan (R)	20D, 15R	86D, 65R	George J. Mitchell (D)	William Cohen (R)	Joseph E. Brennan (D)	Olympia Snowe (R)	George H. W. Bush/ Dan Quayle (R) ✓
1989	Jock McKernan (R)	20D, 15R	97D, 54R	George J. Mitchell (D)	William Cohen (R)	Joseph E. Brennan (D)	Olympia Snowe (R)	George H. W. Bush/ Dan Quayle (R) ✓
1990	Jock McKernan (R)	20D, 15R	97D, 54R	George J. Mitchell (D)	William Cohen (R)	Joseph E. Brennan (D)	Olympia Snowe (R)	George H. W. Bush/ Dan Quayle (R) ✓
1991	Jock McKernan (R)	21D, 14R	97D, 54R	George J. Mitchell (D)	William Cohen (R)	Thomas Andrews (D)	Olympia Snowe (R)	George H. W. Bush/ Dan Quayle (R) ✓
1992	Jock McKernan (R)	21D, 14R	97D, 54R	George J. Mitchell (D)	William Cohen (R)	Thomas Andrews (D)	Olympia Snowe (R)	Bill Clinton/ Al Gore (D) ✓
1993	Jock McKernan (R)	20D, 15R	90D, 61R	George J. Mitchell (D)	William Cohen (R)	Thomas Andrews (D)	Olympia Snowe (R)	Bill Clinton/ Al Gore (D) ✓
1994	Jock McKernan (R)	20D, 15R	90D, 61R	George J. Mitchell (D)	William Cohen (R)	Thomas Andrews (D)	Olympia Snowe (R)	Bill Clinton/ Al Gore (D) ✓
1995	Angus King (I)	18R, 16D, 1I	77D, 74R	Olympia Snowe (R)	William Cohen (R)	Jim Longley (R)	John Baldacci (D)	Bill Clinton/ Al Gore (D) ✓
1996	Angus King (I)	18R, 16D, 1I	77D, 74R	Olympia Snowe (R)	William Cohen (R)	Jim Longley (R)	John Baldacci (D)	Bill Clinton/ Al Gore (D) ✓
1997	Angus King (I)	19D, 15R, 1I	81D, 69R, 1I	Olympia Snowe (R)	Susan Collins (R)	Tom Allen (D)	John Baldacci (D)	Bill Clinton/ Al Gore (D) ✓
1998	Angus King (I)	19D, 15R, 1I	81D, 69R, 1I	Olympia Snowe (R)	Susan Collins (R)	Tom Allen (D)	John Baldacci (D)	Bill Clinton/ Al Gore (D) ✓
1999	Angus King (I)	20D, 14R, 1I	79D, 71R, 1I	Olympia Snowe (R)	Susan Collins (R)	Tom Allen (D)	John Baldacci (D)	Bill Clinton/ Al Gore (D) ✓
2000	Angus King (I)	20D, 14R, 1I	79D, 71R, 1I	Olympia Snowe (R)	Susan Collins (R)	Tom Allen (D)	John Baldacci (D)	Al Gore/ Joe Lieberman (D) ✗
2001	Angus King (I)	17R, 17D, 1I (Note: A power-sharing agreement was negotiated between the Democrats and Republicans, with a Democrat, Mike Michaud, becoming Senate President for one year in 2001, and a Republican, Rick Bennett, becoming Senate President for one year in 2002.)	88D, 62R, 1I	Olympia Snowe (R)	Susan Collins (R)	Tom Allen (D)	John Baldacci (D)	Al Gore/ Joe Lieberman (D) ✗
2002	Angus King (I)	17R, 17D, 1I	88D, 62R, 1I	Olympia Snowe (R)	Susan Collins (R)	Tom Allen (D)	John Baldacci (D)	Al Gore/ Joe Lieberman (D) ✗
2003	John Baldacci (D)	18D, 17R	80D, 67R, 3I, 1G	Olympia Snowe (R)	Susan Collins (R)	Tom Allen (D)	Mike Michaud (D)	Al Gore/ Joe Lieberman (D) ✗
2004	John Baldacci (D)	18D, 17R	80D, 67R, 3I, 1G	Olympia Snowe (R)	Susan Collins (R)	Tom Allen (D)	Mike Michaud (D)	John Kerry/ John Edwards (D) ✗
2005	John Baldacci (D)	18D, 17R	76D, 73R, 1I, 1G	Olympia Snowe (R)	Susan Collins (R)	Tom Allen (D)	Mike Michaud (D)	John Kerry/ John Edwards (D) ✗
2006	John Baldacci (D)	18D, 17R	76D, 73R, 1I, 1G	Olympia Snowe (R)	Susan Collins (R)	Tom Allen (D)	Mike Michaud (D)	John Kerry/ John Edwards (D) ✗
2007	John Baldacci (D)	18D, 17R	90D, 59R, 2I	Olympia Snowe (R)	Susan Collins (R)	Tom Allen (D)	Mike Michaud (D)	John Kerry/ John Edwards (D) ✗
2008	John Baldacci (D)	18D, 17R	90D, 59R, 2I	Olympia Snowe (R)	Susan Collins (R)	Tom Allen (D)	Mike Michaud (D)	Barack Obama/ Joe Biden (D) ✓
2009	John Baldacci (D)	20D, 15R	95D, 55R, 1I	Olympia Snowe (R)	Susan Collins (R)	Chellie Pingree (D)	Mike Michaud (D)	Barack Obama/ Joe Biden (D) ✓
2010	John Baldacci (D)	20D, 15R	95D, 55R, 1I	Olympia Snowe (R)	Susan Collins (R)	Chellie Pingree (D)	Mike Michaud (D)	Barack Obama/ Joe Biden (D) ✓
2011	Paul LePage (R)	20R, 14D, 1I	78R, 72D, 1I	Olympia Snowe (R)	Susan Collins (R)	Chellie Pingree (D)	Mike Michaud (D)	Barack Obama/ Joe Biden (D) ✓
2012	Paul LePage (R)	20R, 14D, 1I	78R, 72D, 1I	Olympia Snowe (R)	Susan Collins (R)	Chellie Pingree (D)	Mike Michaud (D)	Barack Obama/ Joe Biden (D) ✓
2013	Paul LePage (R)	19D, 15R, 1I	89D, 58R, 4I	Angus King (I) (Note: As Senator, King has consistently caucused with the Senate Democratic Caucus.)	Susan Collins (R)	Chellie Pingree (D)	Mike Michaud (D)	Barack Obama/ Joe Biden (D) ✓
2014	Paul LePage (R)	19D, 15R, 1I	89D, 58R, 4I	Angus King (I)	Susan Collins (R)	Chellie Pingree (D)	Mike Michaud (D)	Barack Obama/ Joe Biden (D) ✓
2015	Paul LePage (R)	20R, 15D	78D, 68R, 5I	Angus King (I)	Susan Collins (R)	Chellie Pingree (D)	Bruce Poliquin (R)	Barack Obama/ Joe Biden (D) ✓
2016	Paul LePage (R)	20R, 15D	78D, 69R, 4I	Angus King (I)	Susan Collins (R)	Chellie Pingree (D)	Bruce Poliquin (R)	3 – Hillary Clinton/ Tim Kaine (D) ✗ 1 – Donald Trump/ Mike Pence (R) ✓ (Note: The Democratic ticket received Maine's two at-large votes and one vote in the First Congressional District while the Republican ticket received one vote in the Second District.)
2017	Paul LePage (R)	18R, 17D	77D, 73R, 1I	Angus King (I)	Susan Collins (R)	Chellie Pingree (D)	Bruce Poliquin (R)	3 – Hillary Clinton/ Tim Kaine (D) ✗ 1 – Donald Trump/ Mike Pence (R) ✓
2018	Paul LePage (R)	18R, 17D	74D, 70R, 6I, 1G	Angus King (I)	Susan Collins (R)	Chellie Pingree (D)	Bruce Poliquin (R)	3 – Hillary Clinton/ Tim Kaine (D) ✗ 1 – Donald Trump/ Mike Pence (R) ✓
2019	Janet Mills (D)	21D, 14R	89D, 56R, 6I	Angus King (I)	Susan Collins (R)	Chellie Pingree (D)	Jared Golden (D)	3 – Hillary Clinton/ Tim Kaine (D) ✗ 1 – Donald Trump/ Mike Pence (R) ✓
2020	Janet Mills (D)	21D, 14R	89D, 56R, 6I	Angus King (I)	Susan Collins (R)	Chellie Pingree (D)	Jared Golden (D)	3 – Joe Biden/ Kamala Harris (D) ✓ 1 – Donald Trump/ Mike Pence (R) ✗
2021	Janet Mills (D)	22D, 13R	80D, 67R, 4I	Angus King (I)	Susan Collins (R)	Chellie Pingree (D)	Jared Golden (D)	3 – Joe Biden/ Kamala Harris (D) ✓ 1 – Donald Trump/ Mike Pence (R) ✗
2022	Janet Mills (D)	22D, 13R	80D, 67R, 4I	Angus King (I)	Susan Collins (R)	Chellie Pingree (D)	Jared Golden (D)	3 – Joe Biden/ Kamala Harris (D) ✓ 1 – Donald Trump/ Mike Pence (R) ✗
2023	Janet Mills (D)	22D, 13R	81D, 68R, 2I	Angus King (I)	Susan Collins (R)	Chellie Pingree (D)	Jared Golden (D)	3 – Joe Biden/ Kamala Harris (D) ✓ 1 – Donald Trump/ Mike Pence (R) ✗
2024	Janet Mills (D)	22D, 13R	81D, 68R, 2I	Angus King (I)	Susan Collins (R)	Chellie Pingree (D)	Jared Golden (D)	3 – Kamala Harris/ Tim Walz (D) ✗ 1 – Donald Trump/ JD Vance (R) ✓
2025	Janet Mills (D)	20D, 15R	76D, 73R, 2I	Angus King (I)	Susan Collins (R)	Chellie Pingree (D)	Jared Golden (D)	3 – Kamala Harris/ Tim Walz (D) ✗ 1 – Donald Trump/ JD Vance (R) ✓
2026	Janet Mills (D)	20D, 15R	76D, 73R, 2I	Angus King (I)	Susan Collins (R)	Chellie Pingree (D)	Jared Golden (D)	3 – Kamala Harris/ Tim Walz (D) ✗ 1 – Donald Trump/ JD Vance (R) ✓
2027	Hannah Pingree (D)	23D, 11R	87D, 61R, 3I	Angus King (I)	Troy Jackson (D)	Chellie Pingree (D)	Paul LePage (R)	3 – Kamala Harris/ Tim Walz (D) ✗ 1 – Donald Trump/ JD Vance (R) ✓

Key to party colors and abbreviations for members of the U.S. Congress and other politicians or officials
Alaskan Independence (AKIP) Know Nothing (KN) American Labor (AL) Anti-Jacksonian (Anti-J); National Republican (NR) Anti-Administration (AA) Anti-Masonic (Anti-M) Conservative (Con) Covenant (Cov)	Democratic (D) Democratic–Farmer–Labor (DFL) Democratic–NPL (D-NPL) Dixiecrat (Dix), States' Rights (SR) Democratic-Republican (DR) Farmer–Labor (FL) Federalist (F); Pro-Administration (PA)	Free Soil (FS) Fusion (Fus) Greenback (GB) Independence (IPM) Jacksonian (J) Liberal (Lib) Libertarian (L) National Union (NU)	Nonpartisan League (NPL) Nullifier (N) Opposition Northern (O); Opposition Southern (O) Populist (Pop) Progressive (Prog) Prohibition (Proh) Readjuster (Rea)	Republican (R) Silver (Sv) Silver Republican (SvR) Socialist (Soc) Union (U) Unconditional Union (UU) Vermont Progressive (VP) Whig (W)	Independent (I) Nonpartisan (NP)

== See also ==
- Law and government in Maine
