= 1849 Maine gubernatorial election =

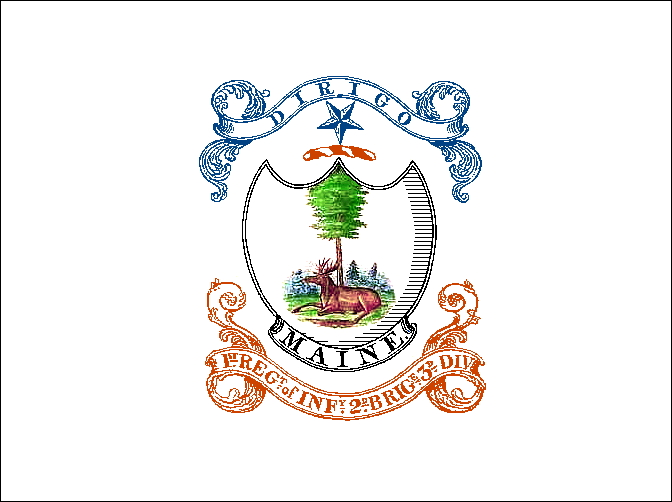
- September 10, 1849
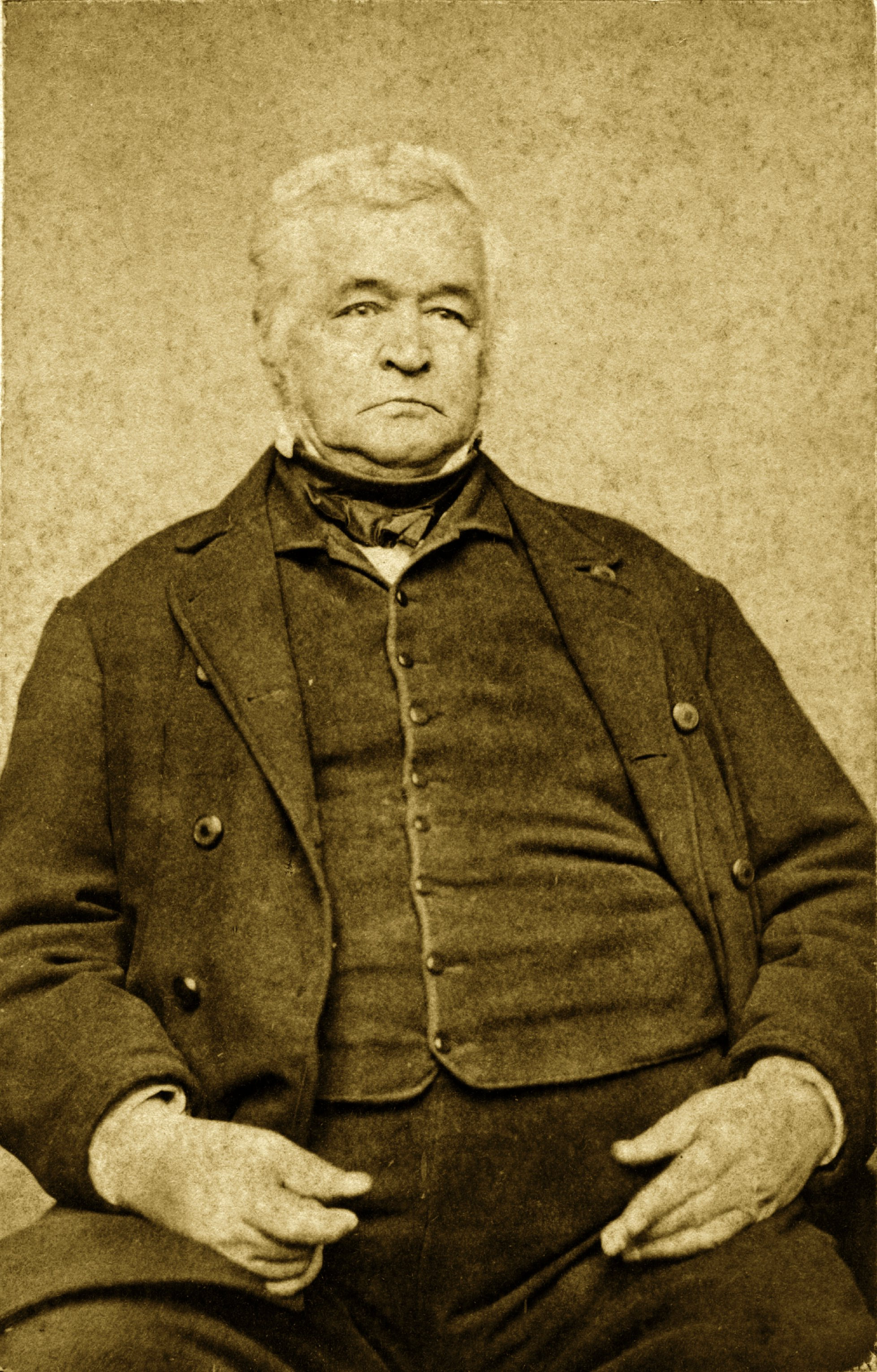

Nominee	John Hubbard	Elijah Hamlin	George F. Talbot
Party	Democratic	Whig	Free Soil
Popular vote	37,636	28,056	7,987
Percentage	51.01%	38.03%	10.83%
- County results Hubbard: 40–50% 50–60% 60–70% Hamlin: 40–50%
Governor before election
John W. Dana
Democratic
Elected Governor
John Hubbard
Democratic

The 1849 Maine gubernatorial election was held on September 10, 1849, in order to elect the Governor of Maine. Democratic nominee and former member of the Maine Senate John Hubbard defeated Whig nominee and former member of the Maine House of Representatives Elijah Hamlin and Free Soil Party nominee George F. Talbot.

== General election ==
=== Candidates ===
- Elijah Hamlin, lawyer, former state representative, nominee for governor in 1848 (Whig)
- John Hubbard, doctor, former state senator (Democrat)
- George Foster Talbot, attorney for Washington County (Free Soil)

On election day, September 10, 1849, Democratic nominee John Hubbard won the election by a margin of 9,580 votes against his foremost opponent Whig nominee Elijah Hamlin, thereby retaining Democratic control over the office of governor. Hubbard was sworn in as the 22nd governor of Maine on May 8, 1850.

=== Results ===
Maine gubernatorial election, 1849
Party	Candidate	Votes	%
Democratic	John Hubbard	37,636	51.01
Whig	Elijah Hamlin	28,056	38.03
Free Soil	George F. Talbot	7,987	10.83
	Scattering	102	0.13
Total votes		73,781	100.00
Democratic hold			
