= Judge Shepley =

Judge Shepley may refer to:

- Ether Shepley (1789–1877), Justice of the Maine Supreme Judicial Court
- George Foster Shepley (judge), judge of the United States Circuit Courts for the First Circuit
