= Lysander Cutler =

Union Army General of the American Civil War

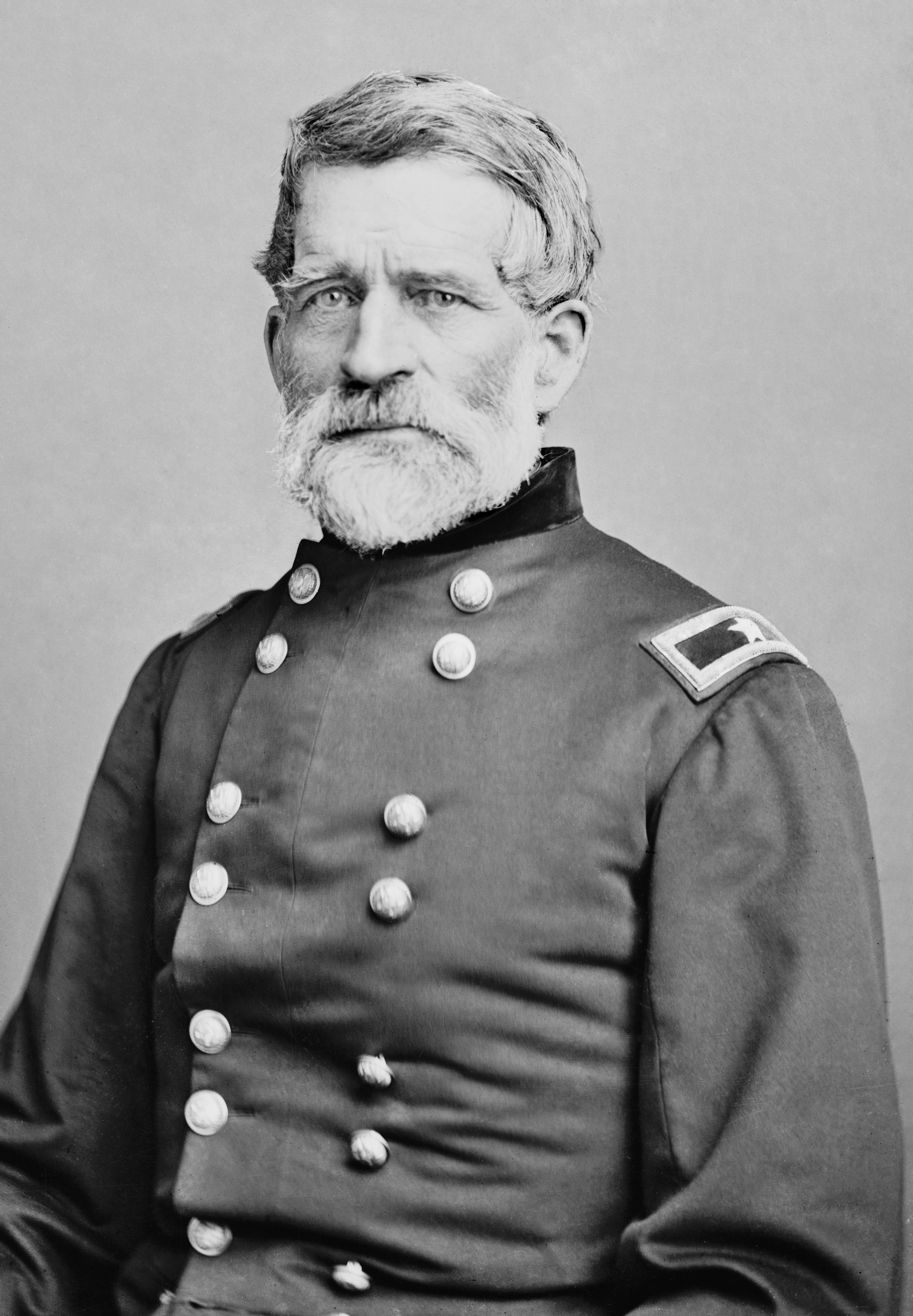
- Lysander Cutler, photo taken between 1862 and 1864

Member of the Maine Senate from the 9th district
- In office January 6, 1841 – January 5, 1842 Serving with Solomon Parsons
- Preceded by: Levi Bradley and Samuel H. Blake
- Succeeded by: Joel Scott

Personal details
- Born: February 16, 1807 Royalston, Massachusetts, US
- Died: July 30, 1866 (aged 59) Milwaukee, Wisconsin, US
- Cause of death: Stroke
- Resting place: Forest Home Cemetery; Milwaukee, Wisconsin
- Spouses: Catharine W. Cutler; (died 1888)
- Children: William Graham Cutler; (b. 1831; died 1916)
- Parents: Tarrant Cutler (father); Lydia (Whitney) Cutler (mother)
- Nickname: "Gray Wolf"

Military service
- Allegiance: United States: Union
- Branch/service: United States Army: Union Army
- Years of service: 1861–1865
- Rank: Brigadier General; Brevet Major General
- Commands: 6th Reg. Wis. Vol. Infantry; Iron Brigade; 2nd Brig., 1st Div., I Corps; 4th Div., V Corps
- Battles/wars: American Civil War; Northern Virginia Campaign; Second Battle of Bull Run (WIA); Fredericksburg Campaign; Battle of Fredericksburg; Mud March; Chancellorsville Campaign; Battle of Chancellorsville; Gettysburg campaign; Battle of Gettysburg; Overland Campaign; Battle of the Wilderness; Battle of Spotsylvania Court House; Battle of North Anna; Battle of Totopotomoy Creek; Siege of Petersburg; Second Battle of Petersburg; Battle of Globe Tavern (WIA)

Lysander Cutler (February 16, 1807 – July 30, 1866) was an American businessman, educator, politician, and Wisconsin pioneer. He served as a Union Army officer through almost the entire American Civil War, notably commanding the famed Iron Brigade of the Army of the Potomac. He rose to the rank of brigadier ganeral and received an honorary brevet to major general. Earlier in his career, he was a member of the Maine Senate.

== Early years ==
Cutler was born in Royalston, Massachusetts, the son of a farmer. Despite objections from his father, he desired a better education than the rudimentary courses he received in the local school, so he studied surveying and then began a career as a schoolmaster. Moving to Dexter, Maine, at the age of 21, he was forced to confront unruly pupils who had "flogged and ejected" the last several teachers who had attempted to discipline them. Cutler established his reputation by spending his first day in the "thorough flogging of every bully in the school."

Although he received some military experience fighting Indians as a colonel in the Maine militia in the 1830s, the majority of his time before the Civil War was engaged in a variety of business pursuits. He started a woolen mill, a foundry, a flour mill, and a sawmill, becoming very wealthy in the process. Cutler invested in various factories and in tenement housing.

He was prominent in civic affairs as a selectman, director of a railroad, trustee of Tufts College, and a member of the Maine State Senate in 1841. Cutler's woolen mill, built in 1843, burned to the ground in 1853, causing him to lose his entire investment. The financial panic of 1856 and depression of 1857 ruined him financially, and he decided to leave Maine and move to Milwaukee, Wisconsin, to restart his career.

In Wisconsin, Cutler worked as a claims investigator for a mining company. He was required to make frequent trips into Indian territory, where he was often threatened with ambush and death. The mining company eventually failed, but a grain business that he founded in Milwaukee provided him with a living.

== Civil War service ==
=== 1861–1862 ===
In the first summer of the Civil War, Cutler, a respected 54-year-old businessman and Indian-fighter, was commissioned colonel of the 6th Wisconsin Infantry on July 16, 1861. This regiment would eventually become one of the units to comprise the famous Iron Brigade of the Army of the Potomac.

During the fall and winter, he got off to a bad start as a commander, alienating his junior officers by insisting that they pass examinations on military topics, and removing them from command if he was displeased with the results. Many men of the regiment were of recent immigrant status and he sometimes enraged the enlisted men of the company by replacing their officers with men of different national backgrounds, and sometimes speaking different languages. Despite these problems, Cutler was elevated to temporary brigade command in the I Corps of the Army of the Potomac on March 13, 1862.

Cutler's men rejoiced when this temporary position was filled by Brig. Gen. John Gibbon that summer. The regiment's first significant action was the Second Battle of Bull Run, where he demonstrated that he was a tenacious fighter. One soldier in his regiment said that he was "rugged as a wolf." During the fighting against Stonewall Jackson at Brawner's Farm, Cutler was severely wounded in the right thigh, causing him to miss the Maryland Campaign and the Battle of Antietam of September 1862.

When Gen. Gibbon was promoted to division command, he recommended that the recuperating Cutler be given command of the Iron Brigade, but Col. Solomon Meredith of the 19th Indiana had better political connections and received the appointment, dismaying Cutler. During the Battle of Fredericksburg in December, division commander Maj. Gen. Abner Doubleday placed Cutler in temporary command of the Iron Brigade for a few hours, dissatisfied with what he considered tardy execution of orders by Col. Meredith. After the battle, Cutler was promoted to brigadier general, to rank from November 29, 1862.

=== 1863 ===
In the spring of 1863, Cutler was given command of the 2nd Brigade, James S. Wadsworth's 1st Division, I Corps, which he led at the Battle of Chancellorsville in May, but his unit was only lightly engaged. In the Battle of Gettysburg, they were heavily engaged north of the Chambersburg Pike, (76th New York, 147th New York, and 56th Pennsylvania) withstanding multiple Confederate assaults from the divisions of Maj. Gens. Henry Heth and Robert E. Rodes, coming in from the west and north, respectively.

The brigade itself had been split earlier by Maj. Gen. John Reynolds, with a demi-brigade (14th Brooklyn and 95th New York), under the command of Colonel Fowler of the 14th Brooklyn, to engage Brig. Gen. James Archer's brigade south of the Chambersburg Pike. By the time the I Corps line broke around 4 p.m., his brigade had suffered over 50% casualties.

During the frantic retreat through the town of Gettysburg, Cutler had two horses shot out from under him. For the remainder of the three-day battle, Cutler's brigade occupied defensive positions on Culp's Hill and, taking advantage of the entrenchments there, suffered few additional casualties.

=== 1864–1865 ===
The Army of the Potomac was reorganized in the spring of 1864 and Cutler was given command of the 1st Brigade, 4th Division, V Corps, on March 25. After Gen. Wadsworth was mortally wounded at the Battle of the Wilderness, Cutler assumed command of the 4th Division on May 6. He led the division through the rest of the Overland Campaign and into the Siege of Petersburg.

At the Battle of Globe Tavern on August 21, 1864, he was struck in the face and badly disfigured by a shell fragment and he was forced to leave field command. He spent the remainder of the war as an invalid, administering the draft in Jackson, Michigan. On December 12, 1864, President Abraham Lincoln nominated Cutler for appointment to the grade of brevet major general to rank from August 19, 1864, and the U.S. Senate confirmed the nomination on February 14, 1865.

== Postbellum life ==
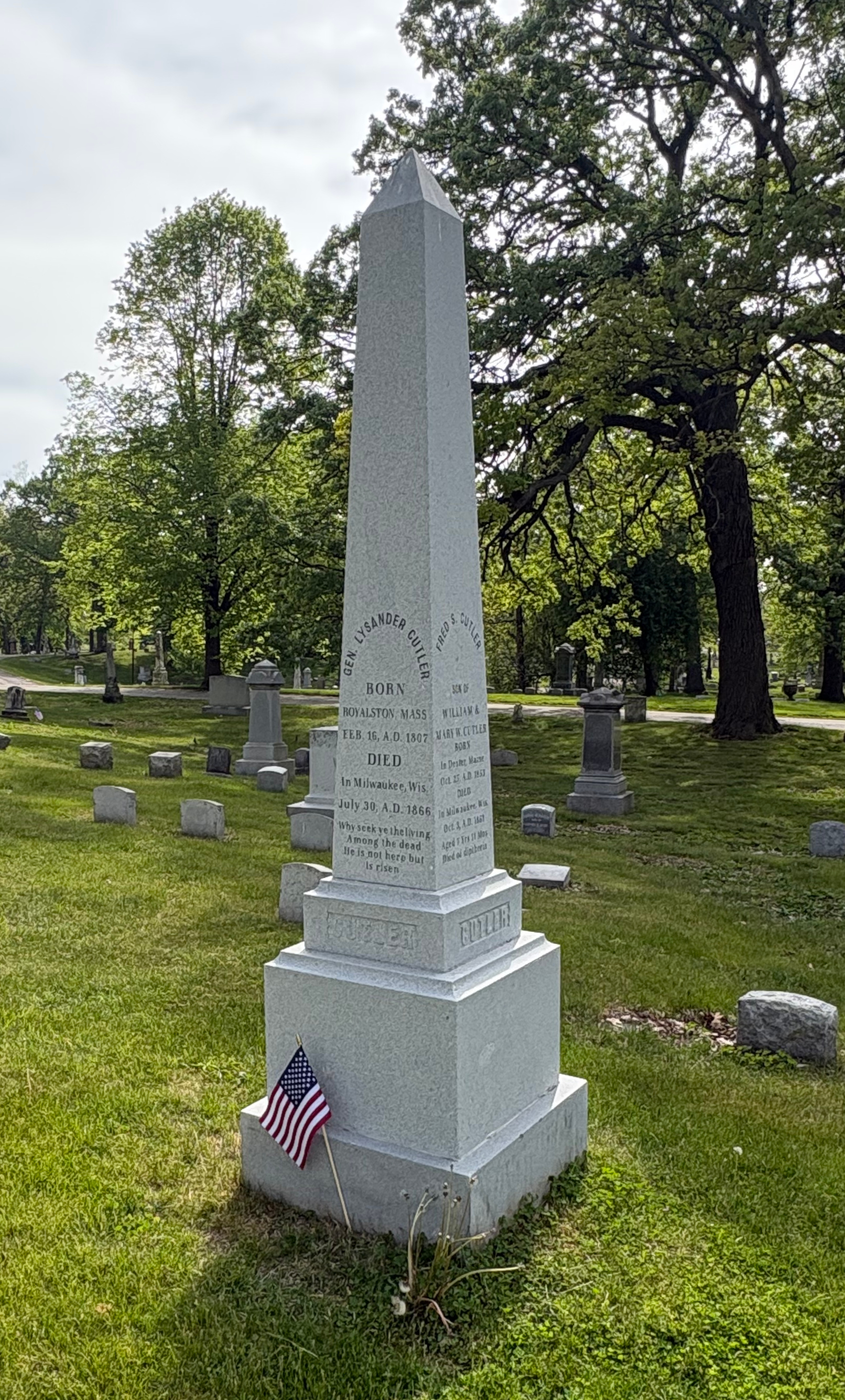
Cutler's grave at Forest Home Cemetery

Cutler resigned from the Army on June 30, 1865, his health deteriorating rapidly. He died from a stroke, which doctors attributed to complications from his Globe Tavern wounds, (Note: Eicher, p. 197; [died] as a result of his wounds) in Milwaukee, Wisconsin, and is buried there in Forest Home Cemetery.

== Depictions in popular culture ==
- Cutler is portrayed by Robert Kaliban in Episode 1321 of the CBS Radio Mystery Theater aired April 28, 1982, "The Ghost of Andersonville". The episode details a fictionalized relationship between Cutler and a former prisoner of the notorious Andersonville Prison, Cal Russell (played by Tony Roberts). Russell refuses to support Cutler's bid for the presidency due to a deep-seated grudge over the general's questionable orders during the war.

== See also ==
- List of American Civil War generals (Union)
- Iron Brigade

== Notes ==
Military offices
| Regiment created | Command of the 6th Wisconsin Volunteer Infantry Regiment; July 16, 1861 – November 29, 1862 | Succeeded by Edward S. Bragg |
Maine Senate
| Preceded by Levi Bradley and Samuel H. Blake | Member of the Maine Senate from the 9th district 1841 – 1842; Served alongside: Solomon Parsons | Succeeded by Joel Scott |
