= Governor Hubbard =

Governor Hubbard may refer to:

- Henry Hubbard (1784–1857), Governor of New Hampshire
- John Hubbard (Maine politician) (1794–1869), Governor of Maine
- Lucius Frederick Hubbard (1836–1913), Governor of Minnesota
- Richard B. Hubbard (1832–1901), Governor of Texas
- Richard D. Hubbard (1818–1884), Governor of Connecticut
