= John Davis (U.S. district court judge) =

American judge (1761–1847)

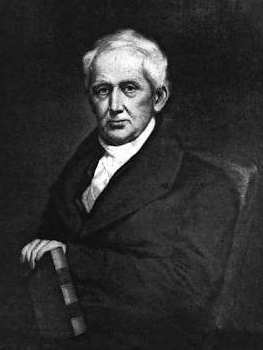

Judge of the United States District Court for the District of Massachusetts
- In office February 20, 1801 – July 10, 1841
- Appointed by: John Adams
- Preceded by: John Lowell
- Succeeded by: Peleg Sprague

United States Attorney for the District of Massachusetts
- In office 1796–1801
- Appointed by: George Washington
- Preceded by: Harrison Gray Otis
- Succeeded by: George Blake

Personal details
- Born: John Davis; January 25, 1761 Plymouth, Province of Massachusetts Bay, British America
- Died: January 14, 1847 (aged 85) Boston, Massachusetts
- Education: Harvard University read law

John Davis (January 25, 1761 – January 14, 1847) was a delegate to the Massachusetts convention to ratify the United States Constitution, Comptroller for the United States Department of the Treasury, United States Attorney for the District of Massachusetts and a United States district judge of the United States District Court for the District of Massachusetts.

== Education and career ==
Born on January 25, 1761, in Plymouth, Province of Massachusetts Bay, British America, Davis graduated from Harvard University in 1781 and read law in 1786. He was a delegate to the Massachusetts convention to ratify the United States Constitution in 1788. He was a member of the Massachusetts House of Representatives. He was a member of the Massachusetts Senate in 1795. He was Comptroller for the United States Department of the Treasury from 1795 to 1796. He was the United States Attorney for the District of Massachusetts from 1796 to 1801.

== Federal judicial service ==
Davis was nominated by President John Adams on February 18, 1801, to a seat on the United States District Court for the District of Massachusetts vacated by Judge John Lowell. He was confirmed by the United States Senate on February 20, 1801, and received his commission the same day. On March 4, 1813, he swore in Elbridge Gerry as Vice President of the United States at Elbridge's home in Massachusetts. His service terminated on July 10, 1841, due to his resignation.

== Death ==
Davis died on January 14, 1847, in Boston, Massachusetts, aged 85.

== Memberships ==
Davis was elected a Fellow of the American Academy of Arts and Sciences in 1792, Davis was also elected a member of the American Antiquarian Society in 1813.

== See also ==
- Davis political family
- List of United States federal judges by longevity of service

== Sources ==
- Johnson, Allen & Malone, Dumas (ed.'s). Dictionary of American Biography. vol. III. Charles Scribner's Sons, New York, N.Y. 1959.

Legal offices
Preceded by John Lowell	Judge of the United States District Court for the District of Massachusetts; 1801–1841	Succeeded by Peleg Sprague
