= Wyman B. S. Moor =

American politician

Wyman Bradbury Seavy Moor
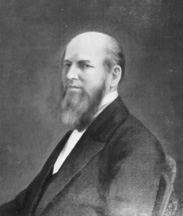
- In office January 5, 1848 – June 7, 1848
- Appointed by: John W. Dana
- Preceded by: John Fairfield
- Succeeded by: Hannibal Hamlin

Maine Attorney General
- In office 1844–1847
- Governor: Hugh J. Anderson
- Preceded by: Otis L. Bridges
- Succeeded by: Samuel H. Blake

Personal details
- Born: November 11, 1811 Waterville, Maine
- Died: March 10, 1869 (aged 57) Lynchburg, Virginia
- Resting place: Pine Grove Cemetery, Waterville, Maine
- Party: Democratic
- Education: Waterville College
- Profession: Law

Wyman Bradbury Seavy Moor (November 11, 1811 – March 10, 1869) was an American politician and lawyer from the U.S. state of Maine. His political career, interspersed with periods in private law practice, began with his service in the Maine House of Representatives, and continued when he became Maine Attorney General. Moor married Clara Ann Niel Cook (b. 1813 in Waterville, Maine) in 1834. She was a descendant of Thomas Dudley, one of the Governors of Massachusetts Bay Colony.

Moor was appointed as a Democrat to the U.S. Senate to fill the vacancy caused by the death of John Fairfield. In later years, he was the superintendent of a railroad construction project in Maine and was appointed by President James Buchanan as consul-general to British North America (i.e. Canada). After he left this position, he retired from public life and relocated to Lynchburg, Virginia, where he had purchased an estate, becoming involved in an iron furnace operation, and living out his remaining years.

Moor was born in Waterville in Kennebec County. During his political career he lived in Bangor, Maine.

Legal offices
Preceded by Otis L. Bridges	Maine Attorney General; 1844–1847	Succeeded by Samuel H. Blake
U.S. Senate
Preceded by John Fairfield	U.S. senator (Class 1) from Maine; 1848; Served alongside: James W. Bradbury	Succeeded by Hannibal Hamlin
