= 1848 Maine gubernatorial election =

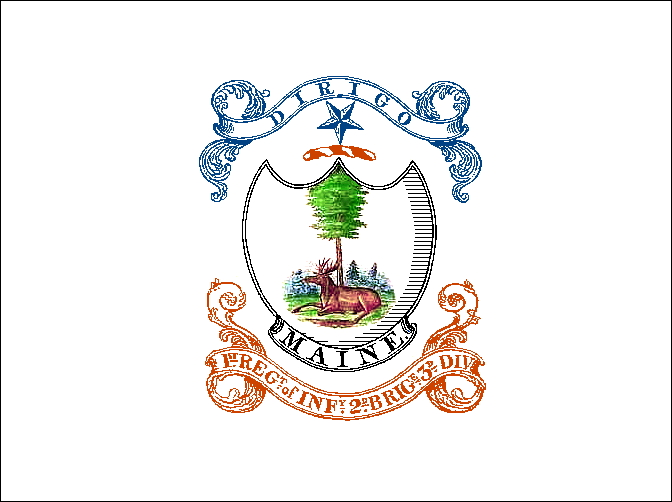
- September 11, 1848
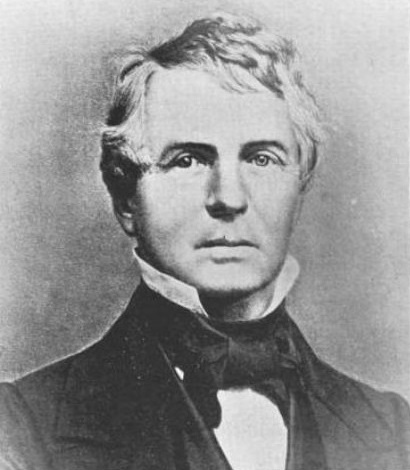

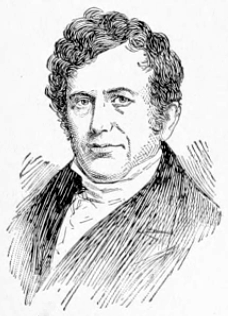
| Nominee | John W. Dana | Elijah Hamlin | Samuel Fessenden |
| Party | Democratic | Whig | Liberty |
| Electoral vote | (Elected) |
| Popular vote | 38,720 | 29,738 | 11,484 |
| Percentage | 48.10% | 36.94% | 14.27% |
- County results Dana: 40–50% 50–60% 60–70% 70–80% Hamlin: 40–50% 50–60%
Governor before election
John W. Dana
Democratic
Elected Governor
John W. Dana
Democratic

The 1848 Maine gubernatorial election, was held on September 11, 1848, in the state of Maine to elect the state's next governor.

The incumbent Democrat John W. Dana was re-elected to a third term, defeating Whig candidate Elijah Hamlin and Liberty Party candidate Samuel Fessenden. Maine law at the time required that in order to win the election a candidate must receive a majority of the votes. Since none of the candidates did so, the legislature held a contingent election in which they selected Dana as the winner.

== Candidates ==
- John W. Dana, incumbent governor (Democrat)
- Elijah Hamlin, lawyer, state representative, brother of future Vice President of the United States Hannibal Hamlin (Whig)
- Samuel Fessenden, lawyer, abolitionist, and former member of the Massachusetts and Maine state legislatures, nominee for governor in 1845, 1846, and 1847 (Liberty)

== Results ==
1848 Gubernatorial Election, Maine
| Party | Candidate | Votes | % | ±% |
|---|---|---|---|---|
| Democratic | John W. Dana (incumbent) | 38,720 | 48.10 | ▼3.09 |
| Whig | Elijah Hamlin | 29,738 | 36.94 | ▼0.19 |
| Liberty | Samuel Fessenden | 11,484 | 14.27 | ▲3.01 |
| Total votes | | 79,942 | 100.00 | ▲22.42 |
| Democratic hold | | | | |
