= Elijah Hamlin =

American politician

Elijah Hamlin (March 29, 1800 – July 16, 1872) was an American lawyer, businessman, politician and historian. He served in both houses of the Maine state legislature and as mayor of Bangor.

Elijah Livermore Hamlin was born in Livermore, Maine on July 29, 1800, and was the older brother of future Vice President of the United States Hannibal Hamlin. He graduated from Brown University, studied law, and was admitted to the bar.

After practicing in Waterford, Maine, Hamlin moved to Bangor, Maine. He served in the Maine House of Representatives in 1830–1832 and 1847–1848, and in the Maine State Senate in 1837 and 1858–1859.

He ran unsuccessfully for Governor of Maine in 1848 and 1849 as a Whig. From 1851 to 1853 he served as mayor of Bangor.

Hamlin died in Bangor on July 16, 1872, and was buried at Mount Hope Cemetery in Bangor.

== See also ==
- List of mayors of Bangor, Maine

Party political offices
Preceded by David Bronson	Whig nominee for Governor of Maine; 1848, 1849	Succeeded by William G. Crosby
