= Samuel Blake =

American politician (1807–1887)

Samuel Harwood Blake (1807 – April 1887) was an American politician and businessperson from Maine. Blake was a native of Hartford, Maine and graduated from Bowdoin College. A Democrat, he settled in Bangor, Maine in 1831 and nine years later was elected to the Maine Senate. He was re-elected in 1842 and served as President of the Maine Senate during that year. He was elected Maine Attorney General in 1848 by the Maine Legislature.

In 1854, Blake ran for U.S. Congress and lost to Israel Washburn of the newly formed Republican Party over the issue of the extension of slavery into the U.S. territories. With the outbreak of the American Civil War in 1861, Blake and many other Democrats joined the Republicans to support the preservation of the Union.

Later, upon the death of his brother, Blake managed the Merchants National Bank of Bangor. At the time of his death from pneumonia in Boston in 1887, Blake was described by the Boston Evening Transcript as one of Bowdoin's oldest living graduates, a leading member of the Penobscot County, Maine bar and one of Maine's wealthiest and best known residents.

Legal offices
Preceded by Wyman B. S. Moor	Maine Attorney General; 1848	Succeeded by Henry Tallman
