= Reuel Williams =

American politician

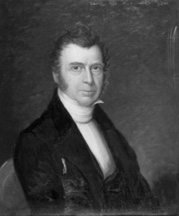

United States Senator from Maine
- In office March 4, 1837 – February 15, 1843
- Preceded by: Judah Dana
- Succeeded by: John Fairfield

Personal details
- Born: June 2, 1783 Hallowell, Massachusetts (now in Maine)
- Died: July 25, 1862 (aged 79) Augusta, Maine
- Resting place: Augusta, Maine
- Party: Democratic
- Profession: Law

Reuel Williams (June 2, 1783 – July 25, 1862) was an American lawyer and Democrat politician from Maine, who served parts of two terms as a US Senator from 1837 to 1843.

== Early life and career ==
Born in Hallowell, Massachusetts to Seth Williams and Zilpha Ingraham, he attended Hallowell Academy, and went on to study law. He was admitted to the bar in 1804, commencing practice in Augusta, Maine.

== Political career ==
He was a member of the Maine Legislature, in the two houses of the legislature, from 1812 to 1829 and again in 1832 and 1848. He was commissioner of public buildings in 1831. He served as a presidential elector on the Democratic ticket in 1836.

In 1837, he was elected to the US Senate to fill the vacancy caused by the resignation of Ether Shepley. He was re-elected to a full term in 1838, and served from March 4, 1837, to February 15, 1843, when he resigned.

While in the Senate he served as chairman of the Committee on Naval Affairs.

== Private life ==
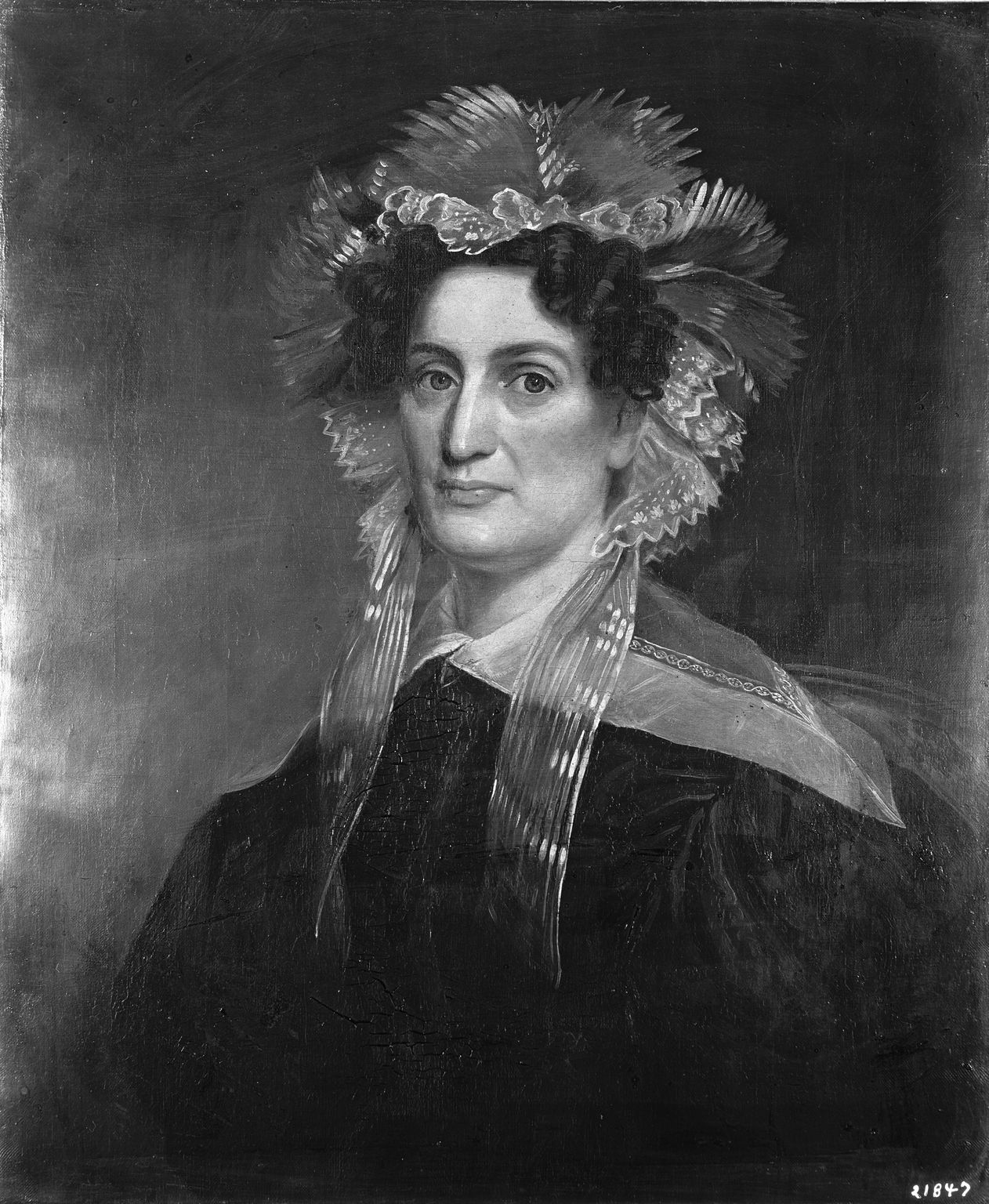
Mrs. Reuel Williams (Sarah Lowell Cony), portrait by Thomas Badger

He was also the manager of the Kennebec and Portland Railroad for 12 years.

In 1807, he married Sarah Lowell Cony, daughter of Judge Daniel Cony of Maine. Their son, Joseph H. Williams, also a politician, was elected Governor of Maine. Their daughter, Jane E. Williams, married Unitarian minister and author Sylvester Judd on August 31, 1841; they had three children. Another daughter, Helen A. Williams, married John Taylor Gilman, originally of Exeter, New Hampshire. After his death, she remarried to Charles H. Bell of Exeter.

He died in Augusta, aged 79, and was interred in his family's cemetery on the banks of the Kennebec River in Augusta.

U.S. Senate
Preceded by Judah Dana	U.S. senator (Class 1) from Maine; 1837–1843; Served alongside: John Ruggles, George Evans	Succeeded by John Fairfield
