= George Evans (American politician) =

American lawyer and politician (1797–1867)

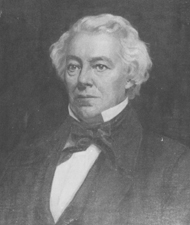

United States Senator from Maine
- In office March 4, 1841 – March 3, 1847
- Preceded by: John Ruggles
- Succeeded by: James W. Bradbury

Member of the U.S. House of Representatives from Maine's 4th district
- In office July 20, 1829 – March 3, 1841
- Preceded by: Peleg Sprague
- Succeeded by: David Bronson

Speaker of the Maine House of Representatives
- In office 1829-1830
- Preceded by: John Ruggles
- Succeeded by: Daniel Goodenow

Member of the Maine House of Representatives
- In office 1826-1830

Personal details
- Born: January 12, 1797 Hallowell, Massachusetts, US (now Maine)
- Died: April 6, 1867 (aged 70) Portland, Maine, US
- Resting place: Oak Grove Cemetery, Gardiner, Maine
- Party: National Republican; Whig
- Education: Bowdoin College

George Evans (January 12, 1797 – April 6, 1867) was an American lawyer and politician from the state of Maine. A member of the United States Whig Party, he served in both houses of the United States Congress and as Speaker of the Maine House of Representatives.

== Early life and career ==
Evans was born in Hallowell, Massachusetts (now in Maine) where he grew up. He graduated from Bowdoin College where he had been a prominent member of the Peucinian Society. He studied law with Frederic Allen of Gardiner, and settled there to practice.

He was elected to the Maine House of Representatives and served from 1826 to 1830; from 1829 to 1830 he was the Speaker of the House.

== Tenure in Congress ==
In 1829, he was elected to a seat in the United States House of Representatives in a special election called after Peleg Sprague resigned to take a seat in the United States Senate. Evans served in the House from 1829 to 1841. He served as chairman of the committee on expenditures of the department of the treasury from 1829 to 1831.

In 1841, Evans resigned from the House to take a seat in the United States Senate. He served as chairman of the Senate Committee on Manufactures from 1841 to 1843, chairman of the Committee on Finance from 1841 to 1845 and chairman of the Committee on Territories from 1845 to 1847. James G. Blaine later wrote of Evans's renown in, among other things, matters of finance:

Upon entering the Senate, he [Evans] was complimented with a distinction never before or since conferred on a new member. He was placed at the head of the Committee on Finance, taking rank above the long list of prominent Whigs, who then composed the majority in the chamber. The tenacity with which the rights of seniority are usually maintained by senators enhances the value of the compliment to Mr. Evans. Mr. Clay, who had been serving as chairman of the committee, declined in his favor with the remark that "Mr. Evans knew more about the finances than any other public man in the United States."

Evans served in the Senate until 1847 when he was defeated in an attempt to be reelected to a second term.

== Career after Congress ==
Evans then practiced law in Portland, Maine and continued to be involved in politics. From 1849 to 1850, he served as chairman of the commission that determined and settled the financial claims of U.S. citizens against Mexico; the United States had assumed these claims under the terms of the Treaty of Guadalupe Hidalgo following the Mexican–American War. He also served as Maine Attorney General during the 1850s.

== Slave ownership ==
According to research conducted in 2022 by The Washington Post, Evans owned at least one slave during his lifetime. He was identified as the only member of Congress from Maine to have owned a human being.

== Death ==
He died in Portland, Maine and is buried in the Oak Grove Cemetery in Gardiner, Maine.

Legal offices
Preceded by Henry Tallman	Maine Attorney General; 1853–1854	Succeeded by John S. Abbott
Preceded by John S. Abbott	Maine Attorney General; 1856	Succeeded by Nathan D. Appleton
U.S. House of Representatives
Preceded by Peleg Sprague	Member of the U.S. House of Representatives from Maine's 4th congressional district July 20, 1829 – March 3, 1841 (obsolete district)	Succeeded by David Bronson
U.S. Senate
Preceded by John Ruggles	U.S. senator (Class 2) from Maine; 1841–1847; Served alongside: Reuel Williams, John Fairfield	Succeeded by James W. Bradbury
Political offices
Preceded by Henry Clay; Kentucky	Chairman of the U.S. Senate Committee on Finance; 1841–1845	Succeeded by Levi Woodbury; New Hampshire
