= Judah Dana =

American lawyer, judge and politician

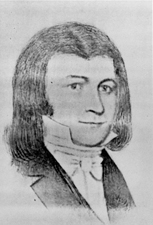

United States Senator from Maine
- In office December 7, 1836 – March 3, 1837
- Appointed by: Robert P. Dunlap
- Preceded by: Ether Shepley
- Succeeded by: Reuel Williams

Judge of the Maine Court of Common Pleas
- In office 1811–1829

Personal details
- Born: April 25, 1772 Pomfret, Vermont
- Died: December 27, 1845 (aged 73) Fryeburg, Maine
- Resting place: Village Cemetery; Fryeburg, Maine
- Party: Jacksonian
- Spouse(s): Elizabeth Ripley Dana; Mehitable Mcmillan
- Relations: Israel Putnam
- Children: Caroline Elizabeth Dana; Maria Annette Dana; John Winchester Dana; Francis Putnaman Dana; Abigail Ripley Dana; Catherine Putnam Dana; Emily Wheelock Dana; Sarah Malleville Dana
- Education: Dartmouth College
- Profession: Lawyer; Judge; Politician

Judah Dana (April 25, 1772 – December 27, 1845) was an American lawyer, judge and politician. He served as a United States senator from Maine and as judge of the Maine Court of Common Pleas during the early 1800s.

== Early life ==
Born in Pomfret, Vermont, Dana was the son of John Winchester and Hannah (Putnam) Dana. He graduated from Dartmouth College in 1795 and then studied law. In 1798, he was admitted to the bar and began the practice of law in Fryeburg, Maine, which was then a part of Massachusetts.

== Career ==
Dana served as the district attorney for Oxford County, Maine, from 1805 to 1811, and as judge of probate for Oxford County from 1811 to 1822. From 1811 to 1823, he was judge of the Court of Common Pleas. He was also a judge of the circuit court.

In 1819, Dana was a delegate to the convention that framed the state constitution of Maine, and was a trustee for Bowdoin College from 1820 to 1843. He was a bank commissioner from 1836 to 1837. In 1833, he was elected a member of the Governor's Council for Governor Samuel E. Smith., serving in 1834.

An adherent of the Jacksonian Party, Dana was appointed United States Senator upon the resignation of Ether Shepley when Shepley became Judge of the Maine Supreme Judicial Court. Dana served as Senator from December 21, 1836, to March 3, 1837, when a successor was elected and qualified.

== Personal life ==
He married Elizabeth Ripley in 1800 and they had eight children: Caroline Elizabeth Dana, Maria Annette Dana, John Winchester Dana, Francis Putnaman Dana, Abigail Ripley Dana, Catherine Putnam Dana, Emily Wheelock Dana, and Sarah Malleville Dana. Their son John became Governor of Maine. After Elizabeth's death in 1819, Dana married Mehitable Osgood Mcmillan.

Dana was the grandson (on his mother's side) of the American Revolutionary War General Israel Putnam.

== Death ==
Dana died in Fryeburg, Oxford County, Maine, on December 27, 1845 (age 73 years, 246 days). He is interred at Village Cemetery in Fryeburg, Maine.

U.S. Senate
Preceded by Ether Shepley	U.S. senator (Class 1) from Maine; 1836–1837; Served alongside: John Ruggles	Succeeded by Reuel Williams
