= John Ruggles =

American politician

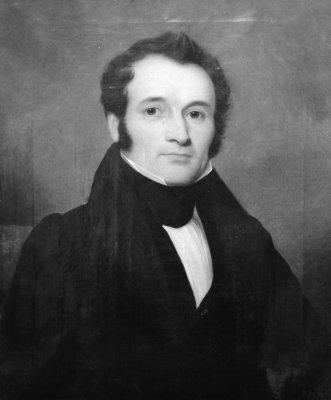

United States Senator from Maine
- In office January 20, 1835 – March 3, 1841
- Preceded by: Peleg Sprague
- Succeeded by: George Evans

Personal details
- Born: October 8, 1789 Westborough, Massachusetts
- Died: June 20, 1874 (aged 84) Thomaston, Maine
- Party: Democratic
- Spouse: Margaret George Ruggles
- Education: Brown University

John Ruggles (October 8, 1789 – June 20, 1874) was an American politician from the U.S. state of Maine. He served in several important state legislative and judicial positions before serving in the U.S. Senate.

== Early life and career ==
Ruggles was born in Westborough, Massachusetts. He attended public school there and in 1813 graduated from Brown University in Providence, Rhode Island. Ruggles studied law, and after being admitted to the bar in 1815 he began practicing in Skowhegan, Maine. Two years later, Ruggles moved to Thomaston. In 1823, Ruggles was elected to the Maine House of Representatives. He served in the House until 1831, and was speaker (1825–1829 and again in 1831). He resigned from the state house to replace Samuel E. Smith (who had been elected governor) as a justice of the supreme judicial court of Maine, serving until 1834.

He also made the first US patent under the current numbering system. The patent was for new traction wheels for trains for going uphill with heavy loads.

== U.S. Senate career ==
The state legislature elected Ruggles as a Democratic-Republican (Jacksonian) to the U.S. Senate to fill the vacancy caused by the resignation of Peleg Sprague. He was later elected for the full term beginning March 4, 1835, and in total served from January 20, 1835, to March 3, 1841. He was an unsuccessful candidate for reelection in 1840.

During his tenure in Congress, Ruggles had served as chairman of the Committee on Patents and Patent Office (25th Congress), and in 1836 framed the bill for the reorganization of the United States Patent Office. He was known for his interest in inventions and patents, and because of his legislative accomplishments in this area he has become known as the "Father of the U.S. Patent Office". Ruggles also was an inventor and the patent-holder of U.S. patent 1, issued July 13, 1836. His invention was a type of train wheel designed to reduce the adverse effects of the weather on the track. This was not the first patent ever from the USPTO; the previous patents were destroyed by fire and afterwards called the X-Patents, and new patents afterwards were numbered from 1 again. Ruggles received the first patent granted under the new system; Samuel Hopkins received the first X-Patent.

Ruggles, a conservative Democrat, opposed the Loco-Foco influence in the Van Buren administration. In 1840, he penned a letter going against his party to endorse William Henry Harrison, whom he described as a man of "enlightened patriotism, great practical wisdom, and sound Republican principles," while denouncing Van Buren's policies as "ruinous to the enterprise and business of the people."

== Retirement and death ==
In retirement, Ruggles resumed the practice of law in Thomaston. There he made several more inventions and was well known as a political writer and orator. Ruggles was wealthy; he and his wife Margaret George Ruggles had children and lived in the largest house on the town's Main Street. He died in 1874 a few months before reaching age 85. He is interred in the Elm Grove Cemetery.

== See also ==
- Patent Office 1836 fire
- Patent Office 1877 fire

== Sources ==
- "Ruggles, John." The Political Graveyard. http://politicalgraveyard.com/bio/ruggles.html#R9M0JBIAQ
- United States Congress. "John Ruggles (id: R000502)". Biographical Directory of the United States Congress.
- Reggles, John. Letter to the U.S. Patent Office. https://web.archive.org/web/20050212172531/http://www.mindfully.org/Industry/Patent-1-13jul1836.htm
- "Senator John Ruggles." Thomaston Historical Society. https://web.archive.org/web/20041205124819/http://www.thomastonhistoricalsociety.com/JRuggles.htm

U.S. Senate
Preceded by Peleg Sprague	U.S. senator (Class 2) from Maine; 1835–1841; Served alongside: Ether Shepley, Judah Dana, Reuel Williams	Succeeded by George Evans
Honorary titles
Preceded by Wilson Lumpkin	Oldest living U.S. senator December 28, 1870 – June 20, 1874	Succeeded by Daniel Sturgeon
