= Peleg Sprague (Maine politician) =

American judge (1793–1880)

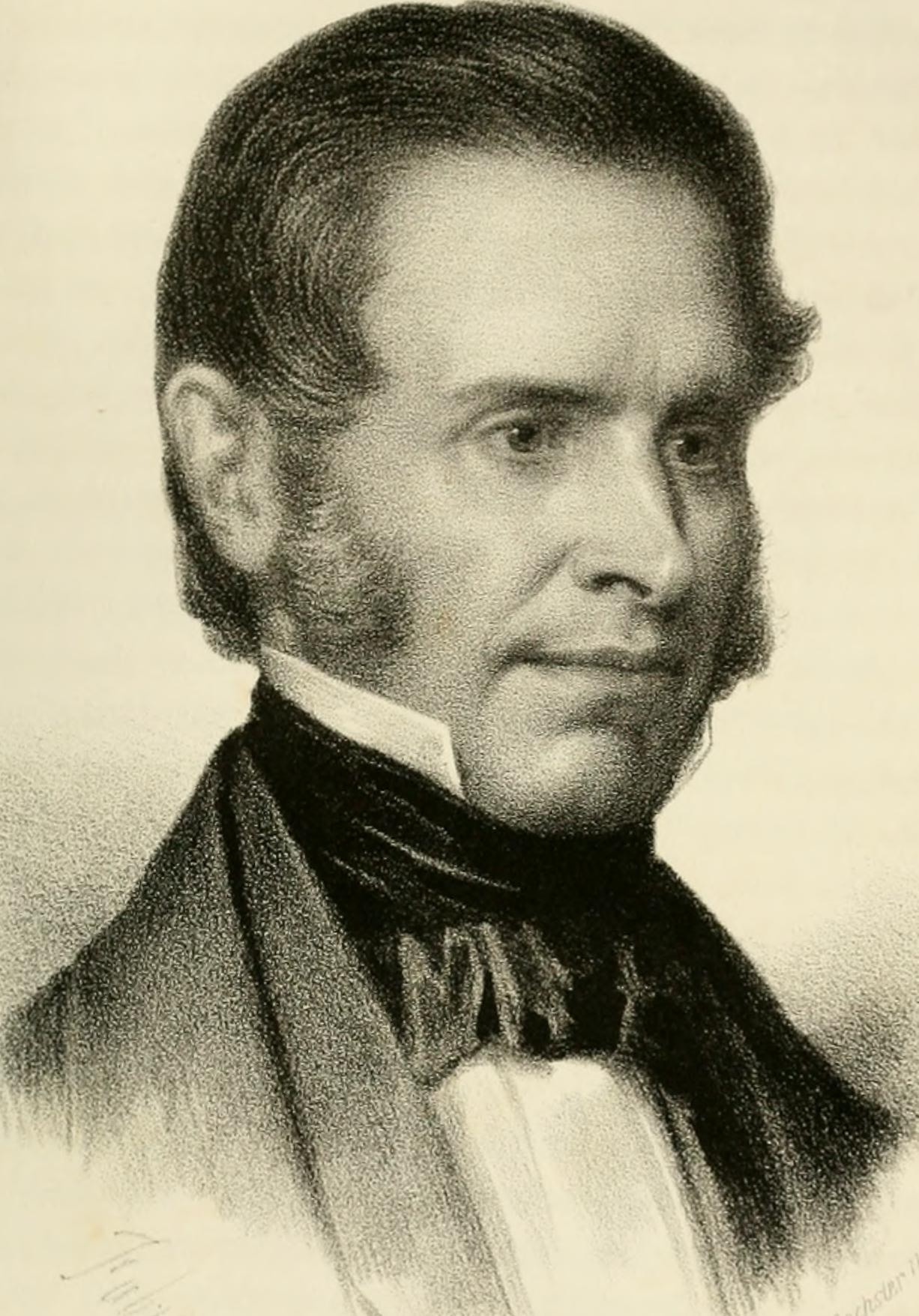

Judge of the United States District Court for the District of Massachusetts
- In office July 16, 1841 – March 13, 1865
- Appointed by: John Tyler
- Preceded by: John Davis
- Succeeded by: John Lowell

United States Senator from Maine
- In office March 4, 1829 – January 1, 1835
- Preceded by: John Chandler
- Succeeded by: John Ruggles

Member of the U.S. House of Representatives from Maine's 4th district
- In office March 4, 1825 – March 3, 1829
- Preceded by: Stephen Longfellow
- Succeeded by: George Evans

Personal details
- Born: Peleg Sprague; April 27, 1793 Duxbury, Massachusetts
- Died: October 13, 1880 (aged 87) Boston, Massachusetts
- Resting place: Mount Auburn Cemetery; Cambridge, Massachusetts
- Party: National Republican; Whig
- Relatives: Charles F. Sprague
- Education: Harvard University (A.B.); Litchfield Law School read law
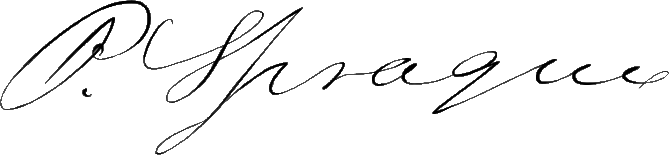
- Signature

Peleg Sprague (April 27, 1793 – October 13, 1880) was a United States representative and a United States senator from Maine and a United States district judge of the United States District Court for the District of Massachusetts.

== Education and career ==
Born on April 27, 1793, in Duxbury, Massachusetts, Sprague received an Artium Baccalaureus degree in 1812 from Harvard University, attended Litchfield Law School, then read law in 1815. He was admitted to the bar and entered private practice in Augusta, District of Maine (then part of Massachusetts) from 1815 to 1817. He continued private practice in Hallowell, Kennebec County, District of Maine (State of Maine from March 15, 1820) from 1817 to 1821. He was a member of the Maine House of Representatives from 1821 to 1822. He was a corporate member of the Maine Historical Society. He resumed private practice in Hallowell from 1822 to 1824.

== Congressional service ==
Sprague was elected as a member of the National Republican Party from Maine's 4th congressional district to the United States House of Representatives of the 19th, 20th and 21st United States Congresses and served from March 4, 1825, until his resignation, effective March 3, 1829, having been elected United States Senator. He was elected to the United States Senate from Maine and served from March 4, 1829, to January 1, 1835, when he resigned. Following his departure from Congress, Sprague resumed private practice in Boston, Massachusetts from 1836 to 1841. In 1840, he served as a presidential elector on the Whig ticket in 1840.

=== Opposition to Indian removal ===
During his time in the Senate, Sprague became a prominent campaigner against President Andrew Jackson's controversial policy of Indian removal, whereby Indians in the Southern states were to be forcibly relocated to West of the Mississippi River. Sprague argued that the policy was corrupt as it largely relied on bribes for support, and he also attacked the plan for its immorality and lack of humanity, claiming that the Indians would receive no assistance in starting new lives in an alien environment.

== Federal judicial service ==
Sprague was nominated by President John Tyler on July 15, 1841, to a seat on the United States District Court for the District of Massachusetts vacated by Judge John Davis. He was confirmed by the United States Senate on July 16, 1841, and received his commission the same day. His service terminated on March 13, 1865, due to his resignation.

== Later career and death ==
Following his resignation from the federal bench, Sprague resumed private practice in Boston from 1865 to 1880. He died on October 13, 1880, in Boston. He was interred in Mount Auburn Cemetery in Cambridge, Massachusetts.

== Family ==
Sprague was the grandfather of Charles F. Sprague, a United States Representative from Massachusetts.

== Sources ==
- "Peleg Sprague". Biographical Directory of the United States Congress.
- Peleg Sprague. 1815–35 Chapter in: William Willis, A history of the law, the courts, and the lawyers of Maine, from its first colonization to the early part of the present century (1863)

Party political offices
First	Whig nominee for Governor of Maine; 1834	Succeeded by William King
U.S. House of Representatives
Preceded by Stephen Longfellow	Member of the U.S. House of Representatives from Maine's 4th congressional district 1825–1829	Succeeded by George Evans
U.S. Senate
Preceded by John Chandler	U.S. senator (Class 2) from Maine; 1829–1835; Served alongside: John Holmes, Ether Shepley	Succeeded by John Ruggles
Legal offices
Preceded by John Davis	Judge of the United States District Court for the District of Massachusetts; 1841–1865	Succeeded by John Lowell
Honorary titles
Preceded by Walter Lowrie	Most senior living U.S. senator (Sitting or former); 1868–1880	Succeeded by John Pendleton King
