= Ether Shepley =

American politician

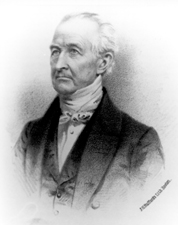

United States Senator from Maine
- In office March 4, 1833 – March 3, 1836
- Preceded by: John Holmes
- Succeeded by: Judah Dana

Personal details
- Born: November 2, 1789 Groton, Massachusetts
- Died: January 15, 1877 (aged 87) Portland, Maine
- Resting place: Evergreen Cemetery (Portland, Maine)
- Party: Democratic-Republican; Democratic
- Spouse: Anna Foster
- Children: Five sons including John R., George Foster Shepley, Leonard D.
- Education: Dartmouth College
- Occupation: Lawyer, Senator, Judge

Ether Shepley (November 2, 1789 – January 15, 1877) was an American politician.

Shepley, a Democratic-Republican, served in the Maine State House before becoming one of the state's U.S. Senators. Shepley resigned from the Senate after two years to become a Justice (and later Chief Justice) of the Maine Supreme Judicial Court.

Shepley was born in Groton, Massachusetts. He attended Groton Academy, (now Lawrence Academy at Groton) and in 1814 graduated from Dartmouth College in Hanover, New Hampshire.

He later studied law and was admitted to the bar in 1814. Shepley began practicing law in Saco, Maine (at the time, Maine was part of Massachusetts.) Shepley became a member of the Massachusetts General Court in 1819; the following year, he was a delegate to the Maine constitutional convention, which drew up the constitution for Maine when it became a state.

From 1821 until 1833, Shepley was the U.S. attorney for the District of Maine. Later Shepley moved to Portland. He was elected as a Jacksonian Democrat to the U.S. Senate and served from March 4, 1833, until his resignation on March 3, 1836.

During Shepley's time in Congress, he served as chairman of the Committee on Engrossed Bills (23rd and 24th Congresses).

On October 28, 1836, Shepley became a justice of the Maine Supreme Judicial Court; in 1848 he was elevated to chief justice. He served on the Court until October 22, 1855 (he was not a candidate for renomination). The following year he was appointed as the sole commissioner to revise the public laws of Maine. Later he resumed practicing law.

Shepley died in Portland and is interred in Evergreen Cemetery in Portland, Maine.

His son was George Foster Shepley.

== Sources ==
- "Shepley, Ether, (1789-1877)", Biographical Directory of the United States Congress
- Israel Washburn Jr., “Memoir of Hon. Ether Shepley, LLD”, Collections of the Maine Historical Society, (Portland: Hoyt, Fogg, Dunham, 1881), vol. viii, pp. 409–437, Archive.org accessed 5 May 2015

U.S. Senate
Preceded by John Holmes	U.S. senator (Class 1) from Maine; March 4, 1833 – March 3, 1836; Served alongside: Peleg Sprague, John Ruggles	Succeeded by Judah Dana
