= John Hubbard (Maine politician) =

American politician

Dr. John Hubbard
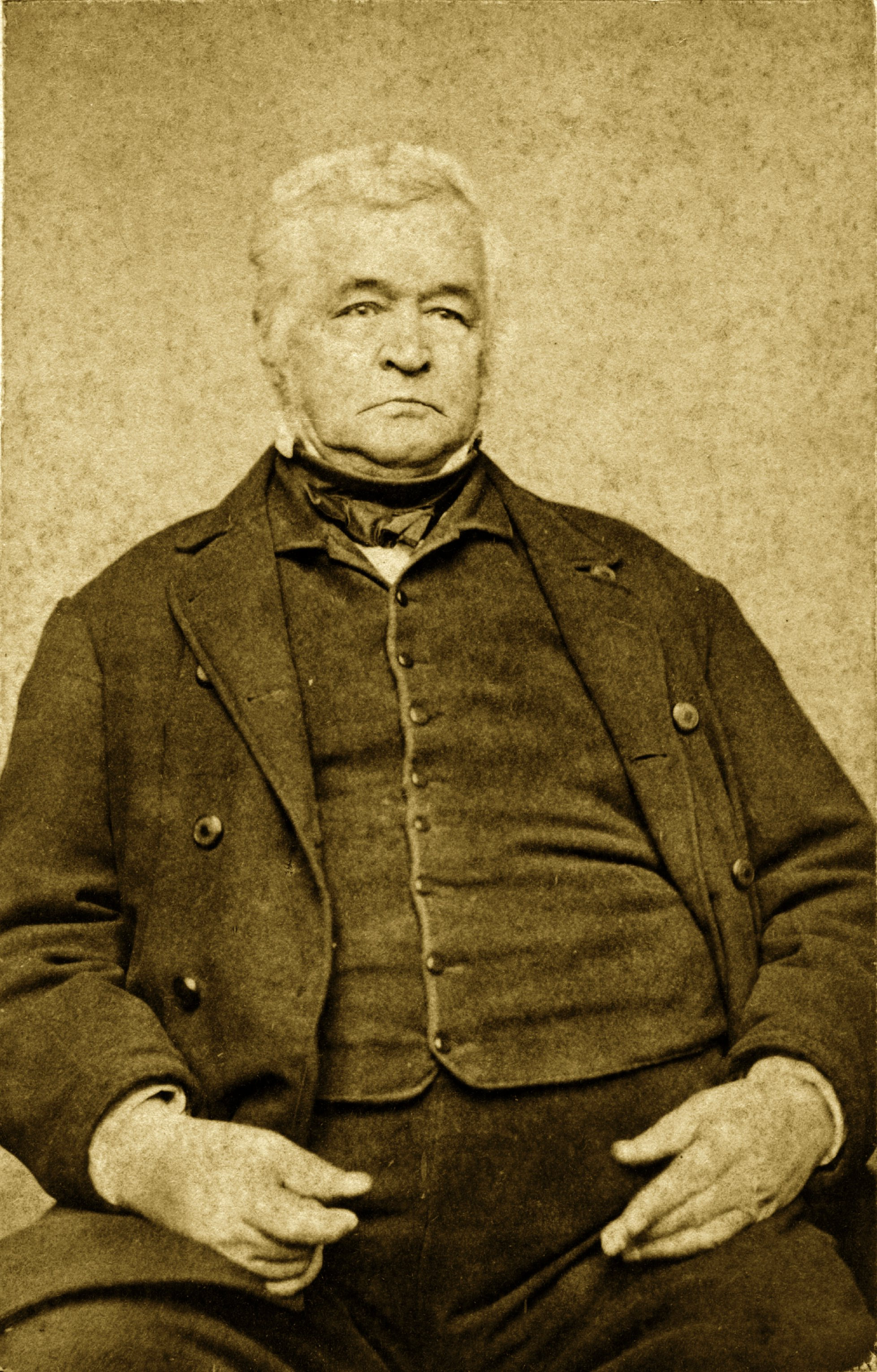
- Hubbard circa 1850

22nd Governor of Maine
- In office May 8, 1850 – January 5, 1853
- Preceded by: John W. Dana
- Succeeded by: William G. Crosby

Personal details
- Born: March 22, 1794 Readfield, Massachusetts (now Maine)
- Died: February 6, 1869 (aged 74) Hallowell, Maine, US
- Party: Democratic
- Profession: Politician

John Hubbard (March 22, 1794 – February 6, 1869) was the 22nd governor of Maine in the United States.

== Childhood and early career ==
Hubbard was born March 22, 1794, in Readfield (in modern-day Maine, then a part of Massachusetts), and was a son of Dr. John and Olive Wilson Hubbard, both natives of New Hampshire. The father was born in Kingston, in 1759, and the mother in Brentwood, in 1761. They came to Readfield in 1784, where they had a family of twelve children, eight daughters and four sons, two of whom died in childhood. John was the eldest son. The father was a physician and farmer and for a time was prosperous, but misfortune overtook him and he finally lost a greater part of his property. His father died April 22, 1838, and his mother died October 20, 1847.

John in his boyhood days had only the advantages of the district school of his town, and when he was sixteen years old he had spent only ten months in a high school. He was a young man of great muscular power, and his strength was utilized in carrying on the work of the farm, of which he had charge. Having resolved to get an education, he devoted all his spare hours to study until he was nineteen years old.

In 1813, then in his twentieth year. his father gave him fifteen dollars and a horse. With this outfit John started for Dartmouth College to learn the requirements for entering that institution, and then immediately commenced to fit himself for complying with them. He rode to Albany, New York, where he engaged as tutor in a private family, devoting all his leisure hours to study. So good progress had he made in the work of preparing himself for his contemplated collegiate course, that in one year he was able to pass the examination for admission to the Sophomore class. Entering Dartmouth in 1814, he graduated in the class of 1816, with high rank, especially in the department of mathematics.

After his graduation he became Principal of the Academy at Hallowell, where he taught two years to earn money to pay the debts incurred in college. He then accepted a flattering offer to go to Dinwiddie County, Virginia, to teach at an academy. Here he remained two years, and having decided to take medicine as a profession, he entered the Medical Department of the University of Pennsylvania, Philadelphia, in 1820, receiving his diploma as Doctor of Medicine in 1822.

During his former residence in Virginia, Mr. Hubbard had made many friends, and upon graduating from the medical school, he resolved to go to that State and practice his profession. Here he remained seven years, until 1829, during which time he had built up a very successful business. In 1825 he married Miss Sarah [Hodge] Barrett of Dresden, Maine. They had two children, one of whom died in Virginia. A brother, Thomas, who had fitted himself for a doctor, followed John to Virginia, and just as he was entering upon a most promising professional career was stricken with disease and died.

== Coping with loss ==
The loss of his child and brother so disheartened Doctor Hubbard and his wife that they resolved to return to Maine. Before doing this he thought it best to spend some time in the hospitals and medical school in Philadelphia, in more thoroughly perfecting himself in his profession. This he did, and then in 1830 became a permanent resident of Hallowell, Maine. Here he gained a wide reputation as a medical practitioner. He was a man of great physical force and of vigorous intellect, and his experience and immense energy of body and mind soon placed him in the front rank of physicians in the State. He would often drive seventy-five miles to visit patients or consult with other physicians in dangerous cases, and it is said that he kept four horses in almost constant use. No distance seemed too long or deprivation too great for him, and he was ready at all times, night or day, to answer calls for his services.

Though devoted to his profession and engrossed in its cares and labors, Doctor Hubbard did not neglect his political duties. Espousing the principles of the Democratic Party in his younger years, he was always an ardent adherent to it and gave it his unqualified support. In 1843 he was elected to the Maine Senate and served with distinction. During the session, an effort was made to pass a law to obstruct the operations of the Fugitive Slave Law passed by Congress in 1793. Doctor Hubbard was chairman of the Committee to which this bill and all petitions supporting it were referred. While he was an outspoken enemy of slavery, he argued that to pass this bill would be an unconstitutional act and a violation of the federal compact. His arguments prevailed, and the bill was killed in the Senate.

== Hubbard the governor ==
In 1849 Doctor Hubbard was nominated by his party as its candidate for governor and was elected over his Whig opponent, E. L. Hamlin, brother of future Vice President Hannibal Hamlin. He was re-elected in 1850, the Whig candidate this time being William G. Crosby. By an amendment in the Constitution the beginning of the political year was restored to the first Wednesday in January, and the Government, by an act of the Legislature, was continued over without an election in 1851. Governor Hubbard was re-nominated in 1852, but while he received a large plurality of the popular vote he failed to get a majority, and William G. Crosby, the Whig candidate, was elected by the Legislature after a severe contest.

During his term of office, Governor Hubbard advocated the establishment of a reform school, the establishment of an agricultural college, the establishment of a female college, and suitable appropriations for the support of academies and colleges, nearly all of which measures were subsequently adopted. He urged that all the lands lying in this state owned in common or in severalty by Massachusetts and Maine be purchased by the state. A resolve was passed in 1852 authorizing him to take such action as he deemed proper, and the Governor with Anson Morrill and John A. Poor entered into negotiations that finally resulted in the purchase of these lands at most satisfactory prices by the state. In 1851 he, as governor, signed the first prohibition act known as the "Maine law". This caused considerable dissatisfaction in his party, and no doubt was the cause of his defeat that year.

== Last years ==
Hubbard was conscientious in the discharge of his official duties, doing what he believed to be right, regardless of friends or foes. He was the earnest supporter of every cause which he thought would advance the moral, social, or personal welfare of the people. In 1859 he was appointed a commissioner under the Reciprocity Treaty concluded between the United States and Great Britain in 1854, in which the fisheries questions were involved. This was his last official position.

The death of son John Hubbard, who fell in the attack on Port Hudson, in May 1863, in the Civil War, was a sorrow that clouded his last years. His son, Colonel Thomas Hamlin Hubbard served in the Maine Militia and survived the war. He lived to see the end of the war, but not that entire restoration of peace between the North and South he greatly desired. He died suddenly, at his home in Hallowell, February 6, 1869.

== Sources ==
- Representative Men of Maine: A Collection of Biographical Sketches of all the Governors since the formation of the State. Prepared under the direction of Henry Chase, Portland, ME: The Lakeside Press, 1893.

Party political offices
Preceded by John W. Dana	Democratic nominee for Governor of Maine; 1849, 1850, 1852	Succeeded by Albert Pillsbury
Political offices
Preceded by John W. Dana	Governor of Maine; 1850–1853	Succeeded by William G. Crosby
