= John W. Dana =

American politician (1808–1867)

John Winchester Dana
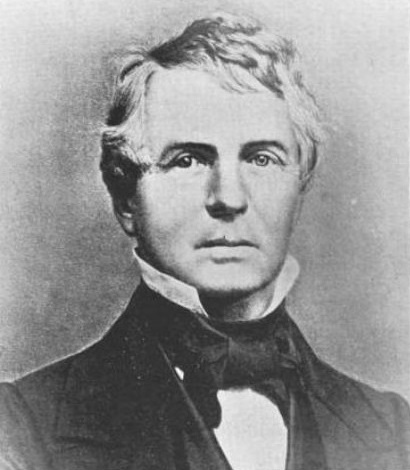

4th Chargé d'Affaires of the United States to Bolivia
- In office February 23, 1854 – March 10, 1859
- President: Franklin Pierce; James Buchanan
- Preceded by: Horace H. Miller
- Succeeded by: John Cotton Smith

19th & 21st Governor of Maine
- In office January 3, 1844
- Preceded by: David Dunn
- Succeeded by: Hugh J. Anderson
- In office May 13, 1847 – May 8, 1850
- Preceded by: Hugh J. Anderson
- Succeeded by: John Hubbard

President of the Maine Senate
- In office 1843–1844

Member of the Maine House of Representatives
- In office 1841–1842

Personal details
- Born: June 21, 1808 Fryeburg, District of Maine, United States
- Died: December 22, 1867 (aged 59) Rosario, Santa Fe, Argentina
- Resting place: Village Cemetery, Fryeburg, Maine
- Party: Democratic
- Spouse: Eliza Ann Osgood (m. 1834)
- Parent: Judah Dana (father)
- Education: Fryeburg Academy
- Profession: Businessman; diplomat; politician

John Winchester Dana (June 21, 1808 – December 22, 1867) was an American businessman, diplomat and Democratic politician in the U.S. state of Maine. He served as the 19th and 21st governor of Maine and as chargé d'affaires to Bolivia during the 19th century.

== Early life ==
Dana was born in Fryeburg in the District of Maine, the son of Judah Dana and Elizabeth Ripley. He studied in the local schools and at Fryeburg Academy before pursuing a business career.

== Political career ==
Dana served as a Democratic member of the Maine House of Representatives from 1841 to 1842. He was a member of the Maine State Senate from 1843 to 1844. and was elected president of the Maine State Senate. He became the Governor of Maine on January 3, 1844 after Acting Governor David Dunn resigned from office. He served only that day. As president of the state senate, Dana filled an unexpired term. Hugh J. Anderson became the Governor of Maine on the same day.

In 1846, Dana ran against Liberty Party candidate Samuel Fessenden and Whig Party candidate Daniel Bronson. No candidate received a majority of the vote; the Democratic-dominated Legislature selected Dana. He was successful in his re-election bid in 1847 and 1848. During his term, anti-slavery measures were endorsed. He left office on May 8, 1850.

After leaving office, Dana returned to his business pursuits. He was appointed Chargé d'affaires to Bolivia in 1853 by President Franklin Pierce. On March 10, 1859, Dana resigned his position and returned to Maine to run for governor. He was defeated by Israel Washburn Jr.

== Later years ==
After losing the election, Dana sold his property and moved to South America to raise sheep. While assisting in a plague stricken area, Dana contracted cholera in Argentina and died in Rosario, Santa Fe. Years later he was re-interred in the Village Cemetery in Fryeburg, Maine.

== Personal life ==
Dana married Eliza Ann Osgood in 1834 and they had five children. Dana's father Judah Dana was a Maine statesman and U.S. Senator.

Party political offices
Preceded by Hugh J. Anderson	Democratic nominee for Governor of Maine; 1846, 1847, 1848	Succeeded by John Hubbard
Preceded by Ephraim K. Smart	Democratic nominee for Governor of Maine; 1861	Succeeded by Bion Bradbury
Political offices
Preceded by David Dunn	Governor of Maine; 1844	Succeeded by Hugh J. Anderson
Preceded by Hugh J. Anderson	Governor of Maine; 1847–1850	Succeeded by John Hubbard
