= 1843 Maine gubernatorial election =

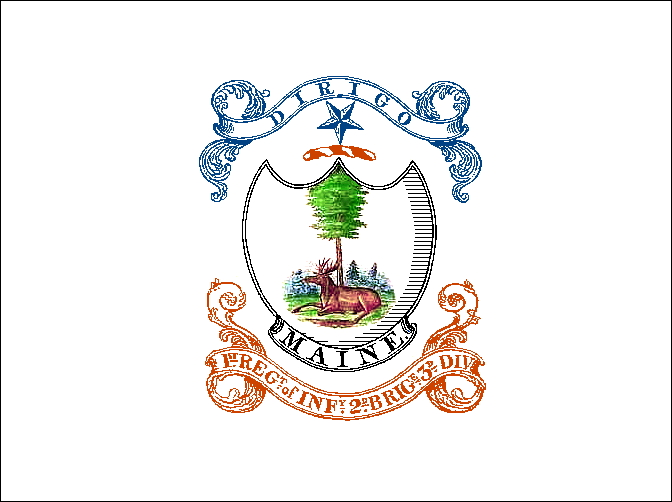
- September 11, 1843
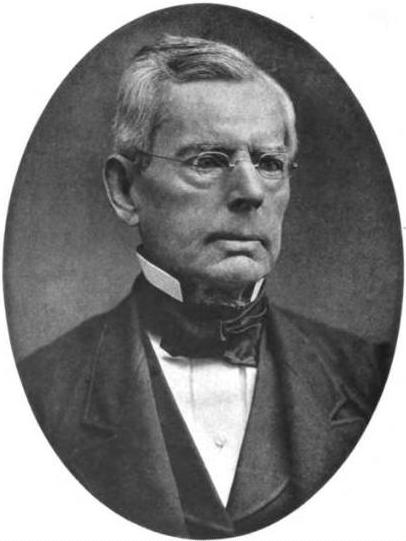

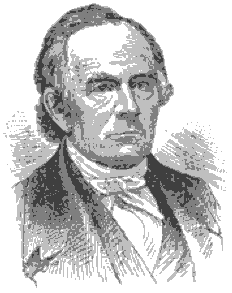

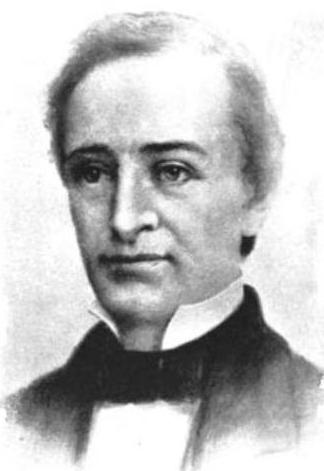
Nominee	Hugh J. Anderson	Edward Robinson
Party	Democratic	Whig
Popular vote	32,034	20,975
Percentage	50.25%	32.90%
Nominee	James Appleton	Edward Kavanagh
Party	Liberty	Independent Democrat
Popular vote	6,746	3,221
Percentage	10.58%	5.05%
- County results Anderson: 40–50% 50–60% 60–70% Robinson: 40–50% 50–60%
Governor before election
Edward Kavanagh
Democratic
Elected Governor
Hugh J. Anderson
Democratic

The 1843 Maine gubernatorial election was held on September 11, 1843, in order to elect the Governor of Maine. Democratic nominee and former member of the U.S. House of Representatives, Hugh J. Anderson defeated his primary opponent Whig nominee and former U.S. Representative Edward Robinson. Minor candidates also included Liberty Party nominee and former member of the Maine House of Representatives James Appleton and incumbent governor Edward Kavanagh.

== Background ==
Governor John Fairfield resigned from the office of governor on March 7, 1843, in order to fill a vacancy in the United States Senate caused by the resignation of Senator Reuel Wiliams. Maine does not have a lieutenant governor, so according to the rules of succession President of the Maine Senate Edward Kavanagh was sworn in as governor.

=== Candidates ===
- Hugh Johnson Anderson, former U.S. representative from Maine's 6th district, former clerk of Waldo County Courts (Democrat)
- James Appleton, nominee for governor in 1842, former vice president of the American Anti-Slavery Society, former member of the Maine and Massachusetts state legislatures (Liberty)
- Edward Kavanagh, incumbent governor, former President of the Maine Senate, commissioner on the Webster-Ashburton Treaty, former Chargé d'Affaires to Portugal (Democrat)
- Edward Robinson, nominee for governor in 1842, former U.S. representative from Maine's 3rd congressional district, former Maine state senator (Whig)

== General election ==
On election day, September 11, 1843, Democratic nominee Hugh J. Anderson won the election by a margin of 11,059 votes against his foremost opponent Whig nominee Edward Robinson, thereby retaining Democratic control over the office of governor. Anderson was sworn in as the 20th Governor of Maine on January 5, 1844.

=== Results ===
Maine gubernatorial election, 1843
Party	Candidate	Votes	%	±%
Democratic	Hugh J. Anderson	32,034	50.25	▼6.67
Whig	Edward Robinson	20,975	32.90	▼4.36
Liberty	James Appleton	6,746	10.58	▲4.90
Independent Democrat	Edward Kavanagh (incumbent)	3,221	5.05	N/A
Write-in		770	1.22	▲1.08
Total votes		63,746	100.00	▼11.19
Democratic hold				

== Aftermath ==
Governor Kavanagh served until January 1844 when he also resigned, leading to Speaker of the Maine House of Representatives David Dunn serving as governor. Dunn only served as governor for three days before he also resigned on the day that governor-elect Anderson was sworn in. However Dunn resigned prior to Anderson actually being sworn in, so President of the Maine Senate John W. Dana served as governor during the interim.
