= 1842 Maine gubernatorial election =

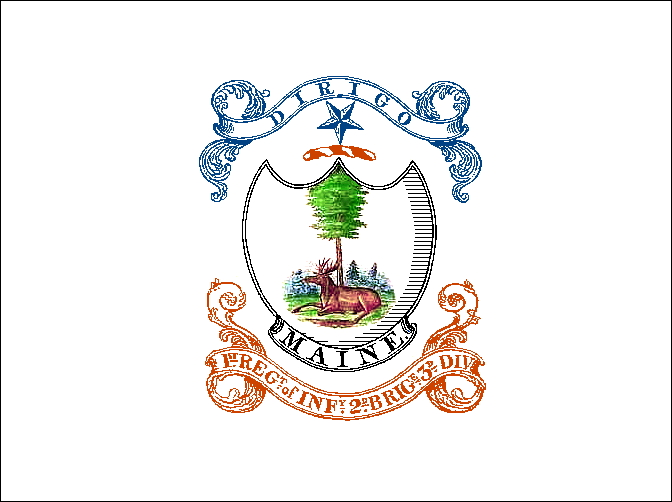
- September 12, 1842
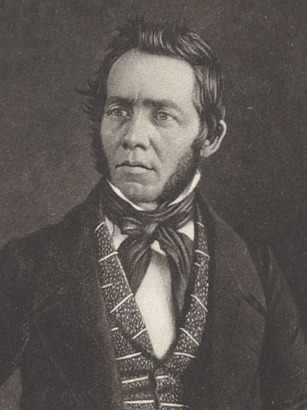

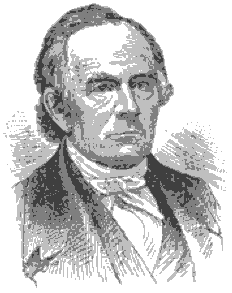
Nominee	John Fairfield	Edward Robinson	James Appleton
Party	Democratic	Whig	Liberty
Popular vote	40,855	26,745	4,080
Percentage	56.92%	37.26%	5.68%
- County results Fairfield: 40–50% 50–60% 60–70% 70–80% Robinson: 50–60%
Governor before election
John Fairfield
Democratic
Elected Governor
John Fairfield
Democratic

The 1842 Maine gubernatorial election was held on September 12, 1842, in order to elect the Governor of Maine. Incumbent Democratic Governor John Fairfield won re-election against Whig nominee and former U.S. Representative Edward Robinson and Liberty Party candidate James Appleton.

== Candidates ==
- James Appleton, former vice president of the American Anti-Slavery Society, former member of the Maine and Massachusetts state legislatures (Liberty)
- John Fairfield, incumbent governor, former U.S. Representative, unsuccessful candidate for governor in 1840 (Democratic)
- Edward Robinson, former U.S. representative from Maine's 3rd congressional district, former Maine state senator (Whig)

== General election ==
On election day, September 12, 1842, Democratic nominee John Fairfield won re-election by a margin of 14,110 votes against his foremost opponent Whig nominee Edward Robinson, thereby retaining Democratic control over the office of Governor. Fairfield was sworn in for his second consecutive and fourth overall term on January 5, 1843.

=== Results ===
Maine gubernatorial election, 1842
Party	Candidate	Votes	%	±%
Democratic	John Fairfield (incumbent)	40,855	56.92	▲1.95
Whig	Edward Robinson	26,745	37.26	▼5.44
Liberty	James Appleton	4,080	5.68	▲3.63
Write-in		100	0.14	▼0.15
Total votes		71,780	100.00	▼16.68
Democratic hold				

== Aftermath ==
Fairfield resigned from the office of governor on March 7, 1843 in order to fill a vacancy in the United States senate caused by the resignation of Senator Reuel Wiliams. Maine does not have a lieutenant governor, so according to the rules of succession President of the Maine Senate Edward Kavanagh was sworn in as governor.
