= Montrose Community Schools =

Public school district in Michigan

Address
- 300 Nanita Drive Montrose, Genesee County, Michigan, 48457; United States
- Coordinates: 43°10′48.6″N 83°53′03.3″W

District information
- Motto: Preparing students today for the opportunities of tomorrow.
- Grades: PreKindergarten–12
- President: Charles Wright
- Superintendent: Linden A. Moore
- Schools: 4
- Budget: $22,498,000 2022–2023 expenditures
- NCES District ID: 2624420

Students and staff
- Students: 1,447 (2024–2025)
- Teachers: 88.7 (on an FTE basis) (2024–2025)
- Staff: 188.75 FTE (2024–2025)
- Student–teacher ratio: 16.31 (2024–2025)

Other information
- Intermediate District: Genesee
- Website: www.montroseschools.org

Montrose Community Schools is a public school district in the Flint, Michigan, area. In Genesee County, it serves Montrose and parts of the townships of Flushing and Montrose. It also serves parts of Maple Grove Township in Saginaw County.

== History ==
In 1926, Montrose's former school was built at 150 North Saginaw Street. It housed all grades until other schools were built.

Hill-McCloy High School was dedicated on October 27, 1963. It was named after Frank B. McCloy, district superintendent at the time, and James J. Hill, long-serving president of the board of education.

Keuhn-Haven Middle School opened in fall 1978, and the 1926 school became an elementary building. It closed in 1981. The middle school pool, with its 200,000-gallon capacity, was considered one of the larger pools in the county. In 1989, the school board voted to allow students at the middle school to wear shorts.

Voters approved construction bond issues in 1997, 2011, and 2023. The bond issues funded additions and renovations at the district's schools.

== Schools ==
Schools in Montrose Community Schools district
School	Address	Notes
Hill-McCloy High School	301 Nanita Drive, Montrose	Grades 8–12
Kuehn-Haven Middle School	303 Ray Street, Montrose	Grades 4-7
Carter Elementary	200 Park Drive, Montrose	Grades PreK-3
Choice Alternative Education	150 N. Saginaw, Montrose	Alternative high school

== Athletics ==
Montrose Community Schools
- School: Hill-McCloy High School
- Nickname: Rams
- Michigan High School Athletic Association: Class "C"
- Conference: Mid-Michigan Activities Conference
- Athletic director: Shayne Mishler
- Location: 301 Nanita Drive Montrose, MI 48457
- Football stadium: Bob Hayes Stadium
- Colors: Red, Black, and White
- Website: Athletic Department

Montrose joined the Mid-Michigan Activities Conference in 2018. Previously, Montrose had been a charter member of the Genesee Area Conference (originally known as the Genesee 8 Conference) since 1978 after leaving the now defunct Mid-Eastern 8 Conference. Since the Genesee Area Conference's inaugural season, Montrose has been successful in football and wrestling, winning numerous conference, district, regional and state championships in boys' and girls' athletic sports.

=== Football success and championships ===
Montrose has one of the top high school American football programs in Genesee County.

At the end of the 2013 season, The Rams had amassed a record of 423-187-6 since 1950, with a winning percentage of .693. Over this 62-year period, the Rams have won or shared 42 conference titles.

Beginning in 1979, the Rams won 29 Genesee Area Conference titles in football, including 17 consecutive championships from 1988 through 2004. It was during this era that the Rams won two MHSAA state football championships. The first of these two state titles came in 1998 when Montrose defeated the Wittemore-Proscott Cardinals 24-14 in the Class "C" title game held at the Pontiac Siverdome. Montrose again captured the Division "5" state football crown in 2002 by defeating Constantine 14-0 to cap and undefeated 14-0 campaign.

Including their two state titles, Montrose has appeared in the MHSAA state football playoffs 18 times between 1980 and 2010.

The book No Quitters Here: Quest for the Dome by B.M. Woodward discusses the Montrose High School football team's ten-year winning streak from 1988 to 1998.

=== Ram wrestling ===
Along with its success in football, Montrose also enjoys a tradition of wrestling championships. The Rams have won ten MHSAA team wrestling championships between 1975 and 2005.

The Rams have also won many GAC, district and regional championships.

== Notable alumni ==
- Former Michigan Lt. Governor John D. Cherry (2002–2010), graduated from Hill-McCloy High School.
- Former major league pitcher Scott Aldred, graduated from Hill-McCloy High School in 1986. He was drafted by the Detroit Tigers and played for seven teams in his 10-year major league career.
- Conservative political commentator Amanda Carpenter, graduated from Hill-McCloy High School in 2000.
- Dan Severn was an amateur wrestler at Hill McCloy High School. He held the national record for consecutive pins (112 over 4 years). He won a World Junior amateur wrestling title in 1977. He was a three-time All-American at Arizona State University, and an alternate on the 1984 Olympic team.
- NFL wide receiver Malik Taylor
- NFL coach Aubrey Pleasant
