= Edward Kavanagh =

Governor of Maine (1795–1844)

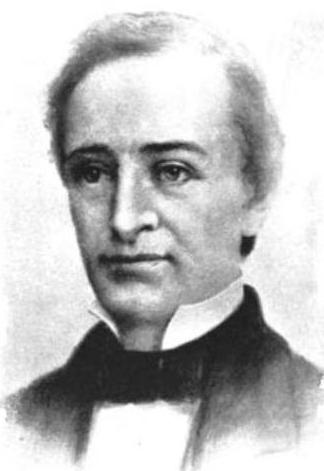
- Governor Edward Kavanagh. From 1893's "Representative Men of Maine".

Member of the U.S. House of Representatives from Maine's 3rd district
- In office March 4, 1831 – March 3, 1835
- Preceded by: Joseph F. Wingate
- Succeeded by: Jeremiah Bailey

Chargé d'Affaires to Portugal
- In office March 3, 1835 – June 1841
- Preceded by: Thomas L. L. Brent
- Succeeded by: Washington Barrow

17th Governor of Maine
- In office March 7, 1843 – January 1, 1844
- Preceded by: John Fairfield
- Succeeded by: David Dunn

19th President of the Maine Senate
- In office 1843–1843
- Preceded by: Samuel Blake
- Succeeded by: Virgil D. Parris

Member of the Maine Senate
- In office 1842–1843

Member of the Maine House of Representatives
- In office 1826–1828

Personal details
- Born: April 27, 1795 Newcastle, District of Maine, Massachusetts, US
- Died: January 22, 1844 (aged 48) Newcastle, Maine, US
- Resting place: St. Patrick's Catholic Cemetery, Damariscotta Mills, Maine
- Party: Democratic
- Education: Montreal Seminary, Georgetown College, St. Mary's College

Edward Kavanagh (April 27, 1795 – January 22, 1844) was a United States representative and the 17th governor of Maine. Born in Newcastle in the Massachusetts District of Maine to Irish Catholic immigrants from County Wexford. He later attended Montreal Seminary (in Quebec, Canada) and Georgetown College in Washington. He graduated from St. Mary's College (Baltimore) in 1813. He studied law, was admitted to the bar and commenced practice in Damariscotta, Maine. He was a member of the Maine House of Representatives from 1826 to 1828, and was secretary of the state senate in 1830.

Kavanagh's public career began with a plea to the framers of the Maine Constitution to include an article for official religious toleration. His first elected role was on the school committee, followed by roles as selectman, state representative, and state senator. In 1829 the legislature elected him as secretary of state.

Kavanagh was elected as a Jacksonian to the Twenty-second and Twenty-third Congresses, serving from March 4, 1831, to March 3, 1835. He was nationally noticed as the first Catholic elected from New England. He was an unsuccessful candidate for reelection in 1834 to the Twenty-fourth Congress, and was appointed Chargé d'Affaires to Portugal on March 3, 1835, and served until his resignation in June 1841. He was one of the four Maine commissioners on the northeastern boundary in 1842 in the negotiations that led to the Webster-Ashburton Treaty, and was a member of the Maine Senate in 1842 and 1843 and served as the president of the Maine Senate.

== Governor of Maine ==
Kavanagh became governor of Maine upon the election of Governor Fairfield on March 7, 1843, to replace U.S. Senator Reuel Williams upon William's resignation, and served until the end of the term in 1844. Less than four weeks later, Kavanagh died in Newcastle; interment was in St. Patrick's Catholic Cemetery, Damariscotta Mills.

Kavanagh's house in Newcastle has been listed on the National Register of Historic Places.

== Electoral history ==
Maine's 3rd congressional district election, 1830
| Party | Candidate | Votes | % |
|---|---|---|---|
| Jacksonian | Edward Kavanagh | 2,164 | 52.77 |
| National Republican | Moses Shaw | 1,707 | 41.62 |
| Unknown | Parker McCobb | 230 | 5.61 |
| Total votes | | 4,101 | 100.00 |
| Jacksonian gain from Adams | | | |

Maine's 3rd congressional district election, 1833
| Party | Candidate | Votes | % |
|---|---|---|---|
| Democratic | Edward Kavanagh (incumbent) | 3,063 | 56.22 |
| National Republican | Jeremiah Bailey | 2,044 | 37.52 |
| Anti-Masonic | John McKown | 341 | 6.26 |
| Total votes | | 5,448 | 100.00 |
| Democratic hold | | | |

Maine's 3rd congressional district election, 1834
| Party | Candidate | Votes | % |
|---|---|---|---|
| Whig | Jeremiah Bailey | 4,240 | 52.88 |
| Democratic | Edward Kavanagh (incumbent) | 3,778 | 47.12 |
| Total votes | | 8,018 | 100.00 |
| Whig gain from Democratic | | | |

Maine gubernatorial election, 1843
| Party | Candidate | Votes | % |
|---|---|---|---|
| Democratic | Hugh J. Anderson | 32,034 | 50.25 |
| Whig | Edward Robinson | 20,975 | 32.90 |
| Liberty | James Appleton | 6,746 | 10.58 |
| Independent Democrat | Edward Kavanagh (incumbent) | 3,221 | 5.05 |
| | Scattering | 770 | 1.22 |
| Total votes | | 63,746 | 100.00 |
| Democratic hold | | | |

U.S. House of Representatives
| Preceded by Joseph F. Wingate | Member of the U.S. House of Representatives from Maine's 3rd congressional district March 4, 1831 – March 3, 1835 | Succeeded by Jeremiah Bailey |
Political offices
| Preceded by John Fairfield | Governor of Maine; March 7, 1843–1844 | Succeeded by David Dunn |
| Preceded by Samuel Blake | President of the Maine Senate; 1843–1843 | Succeeded by Virgil D. Parris |
Diplomatic posts
| Preceded by Thomas L. L. Brent | Chargé d'Affaires to Portugal; March 3, 1835 – June 1841 | Succeeded by Washington Barrow |
