= Montrose, Michigan =

- City
- City of Montrose
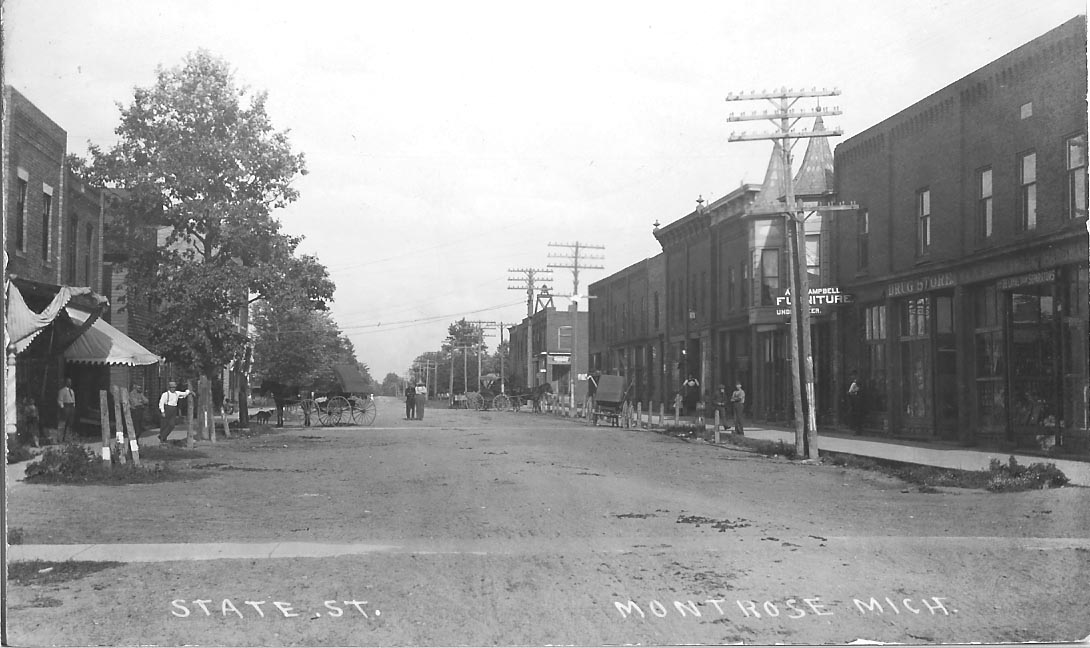
- Main Street (now M-57) in 1912

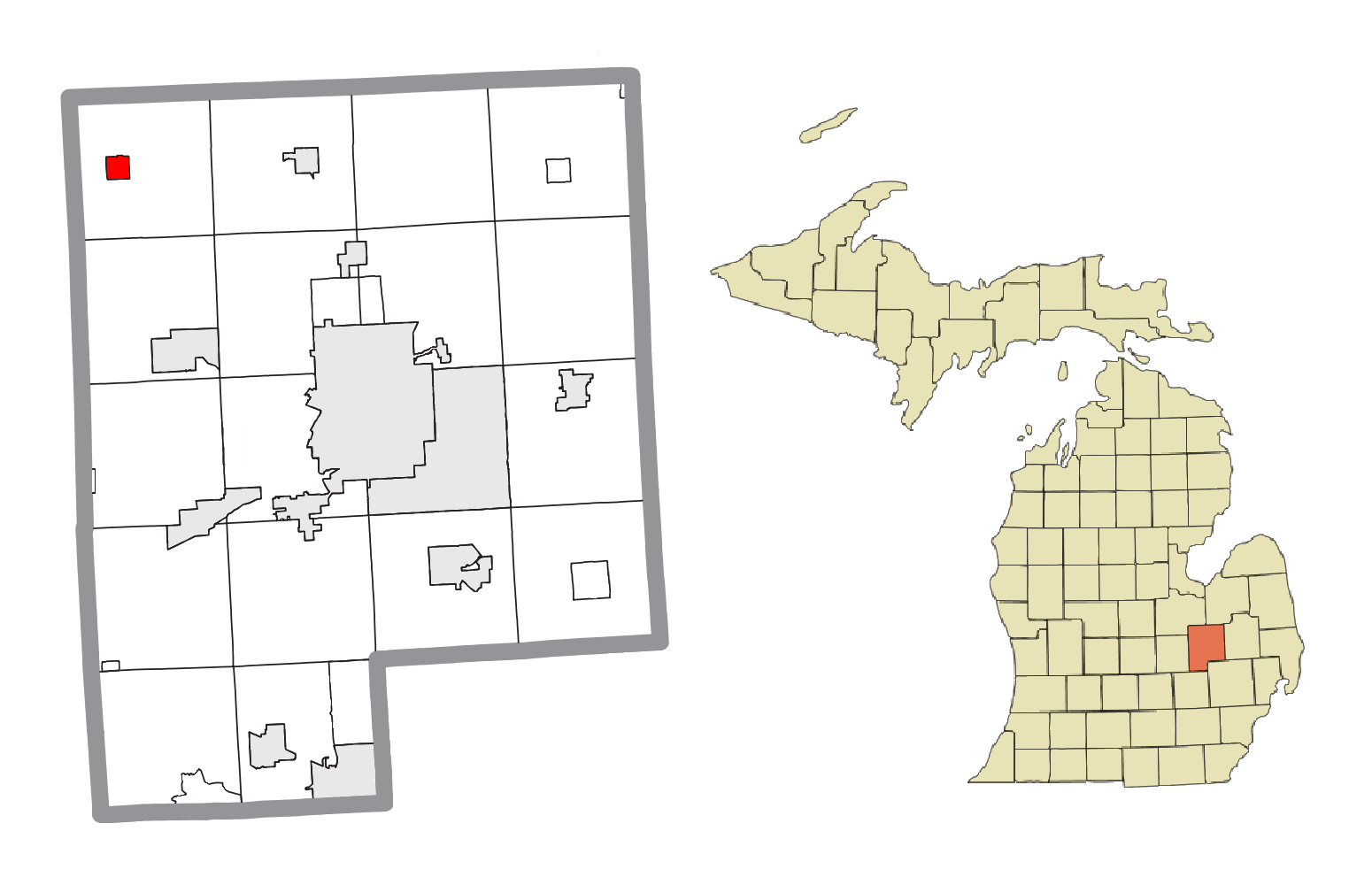
- Location within Genesee County

- Location within the state of Michigan
- Coordinates: 43°10′41″N 83°53′38″W
- Country: United States
- State: Michigan
- County: Genesee
- Settled: 1842
- Incorporated: 1899 (village); 1980 (city)

Government
  - Type: Council–manager
  - Mayor: Tom Banks

Area
  - Total: 0.98 sq mi (2.53 km^{2})
  - Land: 0.98 sq mi (2.53 km^{2})
  - Water: 0 sq mi (0.00 km^{2})
- Elevation: 673 ft (205 m)

Population (2020)
  - Total: 1,743
  - Density: 1,784.6/sq mi (689.05/km^{2})
- Time zone: UTC−5 (EST)
  - Summer (DST): UTC−4 (EDT)
- ZIP code(s): 48457
- Area code: 810
- FIPS code: 26-55280
- GNIS feature ID: 0632609
- Website: www.cityofmontrose.us

Montrose is a city in Genesee County in the U.S. state of Michigan. The population was 1,743 at the 2020 census. Once part of the surrounding Montrose Township, the city itself incorporated in 1980, and both are now administered autonomously. It is part of the Flint metropolitan area.

== History ==
Seymour W. Ensign, originally from New York then Saginaw, became the first white residents of present-day Montrose in 1842. The village of Montrose was incorporated from a portion of the Montrose Township in 1899. In 1980, the village became a city.

On Monday November 27, 2017, the northern loop set of Genesee County municipalities, including Montrose, began receiving water from the Karegnondi Water Authority pipeline and treated by Genesee County Drain Commission Water and Waste Division.

== Demographics ==
Historical population
Census	Pop.	Note	%±
1900	348		—
1910	443		27.3%
1920	522		17.8%
1930	621		19.0%
1940	675		8.7%
1950	937		38.8%
1960	1,466		56.5%
1970	1,789		22.0%
1980	1,706		−4.6%
1990	1,811		6.2%
2000	1,619		−10.6%
2010	1,657		2.3%
2020	1,743		5.2%
U.S. Decennial Census

=== 2020 census ===
As of the 2020 census, Montrose had a population of 1,743. The median age was 37.4 years. 26.4% of residents were under the age of 18 and 15.5% of residents were 65 years of age or older. For every 100 females there were 88.4 males, and for every 100 females age 18 and over there were 84.6 males age 18 and over.

0.0% of residents lived in urban areas, while 100.0% lived in rural areas.

There were 710 households in Montrose, of which 36.1% had children under the age of 18 living in them. Of all households, 38.5% were married-couple households, 17.0% were households with a male householder and no spouse or partner present, and 35.8% were households with a female householder and no spouse or partner present. About 33.4% of all households were made up of individuals and 13.4% had someone living alone who was 65 years of age or older.

There were 747 housing units, of which 5.0% were vacant. The homeowner vacancy rate was 0.7% and the rental vacancy rate was 7.2%.

Racial composition as of the 2020 census
Race	Number	Percent
White	1,538	88.2%
Black or African American	31	1.8%
American Indian and Alaska Native	12	0.7%
Asian	5	0.3%
Native Hawaiian and Other Pacific Islander	1	0.1%
Some other race	17	1.0%
Two or more races	139	8.0%
Hispanic or Latino (of any race)	74	4.2%

=== 2010 census ===
As of the census of 2010, there were 1,657 people, 668 households, and 429 families living in the city. The population density was 1,690.8 inhabitants per square mile (652.8/km^{2}). There were 726 housing units at an average density of 740.8 per square mile (286.0/km^{2}). The racial makeup of the city was 96.8% White, 0.7% African American, 0.7% Native American, 0.2% Asian, 0.8% from other races, and 0.7% from two or more races. Hispanic or Latino of any race were 2.4% of the population.

There were 668 households, of which 36.7% had children under the age of 18 living with them, 41.2% were married couples living together, 17.8% had a female householder with no husband present, 5.2% had a male householder with no wife present, and 35.8% were non-families. 31.4% of all households were made up of individuals, and 13.2% had someone living alone who was 65 years of age or older. The average household size was 2.46 and the average family size was 3.07.

The median age in the city was 36.4 years. 27.2% of residents were under the age of 18; 9.1% were between the ages of 18 and 24; 26.6% were from 25 to 44; 24.1% were from 45 to 64; and 12.9% were 65 years of age or older. The gender makeup of the city was 46.9% male and 53.1% female.

=== 2000 census ===
As of the census of 2000, there were 1,619 people, 625 households, and 430 families living in the city. The population density was 1,773.7 inhabitants per square mile (684.8/km^{2}). There were 668 housing units at an average density of 731.8 per square mile (282.5/km^{2}). The racial makeup of the city was 97.34% White, 0.12% African American, 0.62% Native American, 0.12% Asian, 0.31% from other races, and 1.48% from two or more races. Hispanic or Latino of any race were 1.79% of the population.

There were 625 households, out of which 35.4% had children under the age of 18 living with them, 51.5% were married couples living together, 13.8% had a female householder with no husband present, and 31.2% were non-families. 27.0% of all households were made up of individuals, and 13.1% had someone living alone who was 65 years of age or older. The average household size was 2.56 and the average family size was 3.09.

In the city, the population was spread out, with 27.6% under the age of 18, 9.1% from 18 to 24, 30.3% from 25 to 44, 20.9% from 45 to 64, and 12.0% who were 65 years of age or older. The median age was 33 years. For every 100 females, there were 92.5 males. For every 100 females age 18 and over, there were 86.9 males.

The median income for a household in the city was $36,667, and the median income for a family was $46,172. Males had a median income of $33,750 versus $25,000 for females. The per capita income for the city was $17,056. About 6.1% of families and 7.8% of the population were below the poverty line, including 7.4% of those under age 18 and 8.6% of those age 65 or over.

== Government ==
The city is a customer of the Genesee County Drain Commission Water and Waste Division, receiving water from the Karegnondi Water Authority pipeline treated by the Water and Waste Division. The current mayor is Tom Banks.

== Attractions ==
The town is home to Montrose Orchards as well as the Montrose Historical and Telephone Pioneer Museum. It is also home to the annual Montrose Blueberry Festival celebrating its 50th anniversary in 2021. Every year the city holds the Blueberry Festival and activities including a carnival in the lot of the elementary school and a flea market, along with a parade.

== Notable people ==
- Scott Aldred, former Major League Baseball pitcher and current Minor League pitching coach, graduated in 1986 from Hill-McCloy High School in Montrose
- Amanda Carpenter, author, speechwriter and Fox News Channel political commentator, was born in Montrose
- John D. Cherry, Lieutenant Governor of Michigan (2003–2011) grew up in Montrose.
- Dan Severn, Former UFC fighter and professional wrestler was born and raised in Montrose.
- Aubrey Pleasant, professional football coach, attended high school in Montrose.
- Malik Taylor, professional football player wide receiver, attended Hill-McCloy High School in Montrose

== Highways ==
- M-57 runs east and west through the city.
