= Senator Sewall =

Senator Sewall may refer to:

- Charles S. Sewall (1779–1848), Maryland State Senate
- Harold M. Sewall (1860–1924), Maine State Senate
- Joseph Sewall (1921–2011), Maine State Senate
- Sumner Sewall (1897–1965), Maine State Senate

== See also ==
- William Joyce Sewell (1835–1901), U.S. Senator from New Jersey from 1881 to 1887 and from 1895 to 1901.
