= George P. Sewall =

American politician

George Popham Sewall
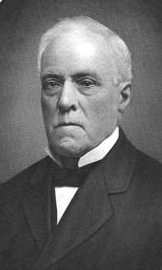

21st Speaker of the Maine House of Representatives
- In office 1851–1852
- Preceded by: Samuel Belcher
- Succeeded by: John C. Talbot, Jr.

Member of Maine House of Representatives

Personal details
- Born: April 24, 1811 Bath, Sagadahoc County, District of Maine, Massachusetts
- Died: December 30, 1881 Old Town, Maine
- Other political affiliations: Whig
- Spouse: Sydney Ellen Wingate

George Popham Sewall (April 24, 1811 – December 30, 1881) was an American lawyer and member of the Maine House of Representatives from Old Town, Maine. Sewall was born in Bath (at the time still part of Georgetown), Maine, the son of Joseph and Hannah Shaw Sewall.

Sewall was elected Speaker of the Maine House of Representatives in 1851 - 1852. He was appointed U.S. Collector of Customs for Bangor, Maine in 1854. His great-grandson, Joseph Sewall, later became President of the Maine Senate. His wife, Sydney Ellen Wingate, was the daughter of U.S. Representative Joseph F. Wingate. Their son James Wingate Sewall started the forest engineering practice that became James W. Sewall Co. James W. was also an adjunct professor of Sanitary Engineering at MIT (Massachusetts Institute of Technology). George Sewall died in Old Town on December 30, 1881.

Political offices
Preceded by David Dunn	21st Speaker of the Maine House of Representatives; 1845-1846	Succeeded by Ebenezer Knowlton
