= Nehemiah Abbott =

American politician

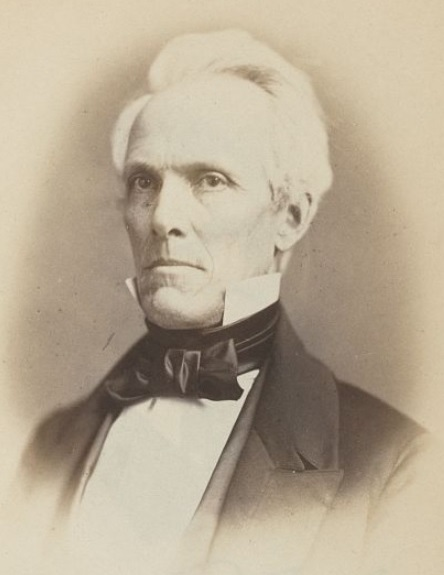
- From 1859's McClees' Gallery of Photographic Portraits of the Senators, Representatives & Delegates of the Thirty-Fifth Congress

Member of the U.S. House of Representatives from Maine's 3rd district
- In office March 4, 1857 – March 3, 1859
- Preceded by: Ebenezer Knowlton
- Succeeded by: Ezra B. French

Mayor of Belfast, Maine
- In office 1865–1867
- Preceded by: Albert G. Jewett
- Succeeded by: Albert G. Jewett

Member of the Maine House of Representatives from Belfast
- In office 1845–1846
- In office 1842–1844

Personal details
- Born: March 29, 1804 Sidney, Massachusetts, U.S.
- Died: July 26, 1877 (aged 73) Belfast, Maine, U.S.
- Resting place: Grove Cemetery, Belfast, Maine, U.S.
- Party: Republican (from 1856)
- Other political affiliations: Democratic (before 1856)
- Spouse: Caroline Williams Belcher (m. 1836–1877)
- Children: 6
- Education: Litchfield Law School
- Profession: Attorney

Nehemiah Abbott (March 29, 1804 – July 26, 1877) was an American attorney and politician from Maine. Originally active in politics as a Democrat, he became a Republican when the party was founded in the mid 1850s. Among the offices in which he served were member of the Maine House of Representatives (1842–1844, 1845–1846), member of the United States House of Representatives (1857–1859), and mayor of Belfast (1865–1866).

== Biography ==
Abbott was born in Sidney, Maine on March 29, 1804, a son of Asa Abbott and Hepzibah (Brooks) Abbott. He attended Litchfield Law School, was admitted to the bar in 1836 and began to practice in Calais, Maine. In 1839, he moved to Columbus, Mississippi, where he continued the practice of law. In 1840, he returned to Maine and settled in Belfast.

Originally a Democrat, in 1842, 1843, and 1845 he was elected to the Maine House of Representatives. Abbott became a Republican when the party was founded in the mid-1850s. In 1856, he was elected to the United States House of Representatives. He served one term, March 4, 1857 to March 3, 1859. During his U.S. House service, Abbott was a member of the Committee on Revolutionary Pensions. He did not run for reelection in 1858, and resumed the practice of law.

During the American Civil War, Abbott supported the Union. In 1864, he was appointed temporary chairman of the National Union Party nominating convention for Maine's 5th congressional district. He served as mayor of Belfast from 1865 to 1866.

Abbott died in Belfast on July 26, 1877. He was buried at Grove Cemetery in Belfast.

== Family ==
In 1836, Abbott married Caroline Williams Belcher. They were the parents of six children— Caroline Belcher, Howard, Emma Fuller, Clifford Belcher, Annie Gill, and Henry Fuller.

U.S. House of Representatives
Preceded by E. Wilder Farley	Member of the U.S. House of Representatives from Maine's 3rd congressional district March 4, 1857 – March 3, 1859	Succeeded by Ezra B. French
