= Scott Aldred =

American baseball player and coach (born 1968)

- Pitcher
- Born: June 12, 1968 (age 57); Flint, Michigan, U.S.
- Batted: Left Threw: Left

MLB debut
- September 9, 1990, for the Detroit Tigers

Last MLB appearance
- May 29, 2000, for the Philadelphia Phillies

MLB statistics
- Win–loss record: 20–39
- Earned run average: 6.02
- Strikeouts: 312
- Stats at Baseball Reference

Teams
- Detroit Tigers (1990–1992); Colorado Rockies (1993); Montreal Expos (1993); Detroit Tigers (1996); Minnesota Twins (1996–1997); Tampa Bay Devil Rays (1998–1999); Philadelphia Phillies (1999–2000)

Scott Phillip Aldred (born June 12, 1968) is an American former Major League Baseball pitcher and current minor league pitching coach.

== Early life ==
Aldred was born in Flint, Michigan. He graduated in 1986 from Hill McCloy High School in Montrose, Michigan, a rural town just north of Flint.

== Playing career ==
Aldred was drafted by the Detroit Tigers in the 16th round of the 1986 Major League Baseball draft. In his first professional season, Aldred compiled an 8–7 record with a 3.57 ERA and 91 strikeouts in 110 innings with the Fayetteville Generals in 1987. Following this performance, he was seen as the best pitching prospect in the organization.

Aldred struck out 102 batters in 131 1/3 innings with the Lakeland Tigers in 1988. Aldred was 10–6 with 3.84 ERA and 97 strikeouts in 122 innings with the London Tigers in 1989 despite being sidelined in mid-season with a hand injury.

Aldred was promoted to the Major Leagues for the first time in September 1990 after compiling 6–15 mark and 4.90 ERA with the Triple-A Toledo Mud Hens, ranking third in the International League in strikeouts (133 in 158 innings). He played for the Detroit Tigers through 1992.

After the 1992 season, Aldred was taken by the Colorado Rockies in the 1992 Major League Baseball expansion draft. He was selected off waivers by the Montreal Expos in April 1993. He experienced a sore arm, underwent Tommy John surgery, missed all of 1994 season, and returned to the Tigers organization in 1995.

Aldred started on the home opener for the Tigers in 1996. He pitched for the Minnesota Twins (1996–1997), Tampa Bay Devil Rays (1998–1999), and the Philadelphia Phillies (1999–2000). On September 24, 1999, Aldred picked up his only MLB save. He pitched a perfect 9th inning, nailing down a 3-2 Phillies win over the Mets. He saved the game for starter Joe Grahe. In 2001, Aldred pitched for the Double-A Norwich Navigators of the New York Yankees organization. In 2002, he pitched for the Los Angeles Dodgers Triple-A affiliate, the Las Vegas 51s. In 2003, he pitched for the Double-A Portland Sea Dogs and Triple-A Pawtucket Red Sox of the Boston Red Sox organization. After he was released during the 2003 season, he pitched for the Somerset Patriots of the Atlantic League of Professional Baseball in 2003 and 2004 before retiring due to elbow trouble.

Aldred held the Major League record for most appearances in a single season without a decision (earning a win or being charged with a loss) with 48 until 2007 when it was broken by Trever Miller. He accomplished this feat in 1998 with the Devil Rays.

In between, Aldred played winter ball with the Águilas del Zulia, Cardenales de Lara and Leones del Caracas clubs of the Venezuelan League during four seasons spanning 1990–2003. He posted a 15–12 record and a 3.37 ERA in 46 pitching appearances (35 starts), striking out 114 batters while walking 91 in 197 2/3 innings of work.

== Coaching career ==
Aldred was the pitching coach of the New York Yankees Double-A affiliate, the Trenton Thunder, in 2007 and 2008. From 2009 to 2015, he was the pitching coach of the Yankees Triple-A affiliate, the Scranton/Wilkes-Barre RailRiders.

In 2025, Aldred was named pitching coach of the Charlotte Knights the Triple-A affiliate of the Chicago White Sox.
