= Ezra B. French =

American politician (1810–1880)

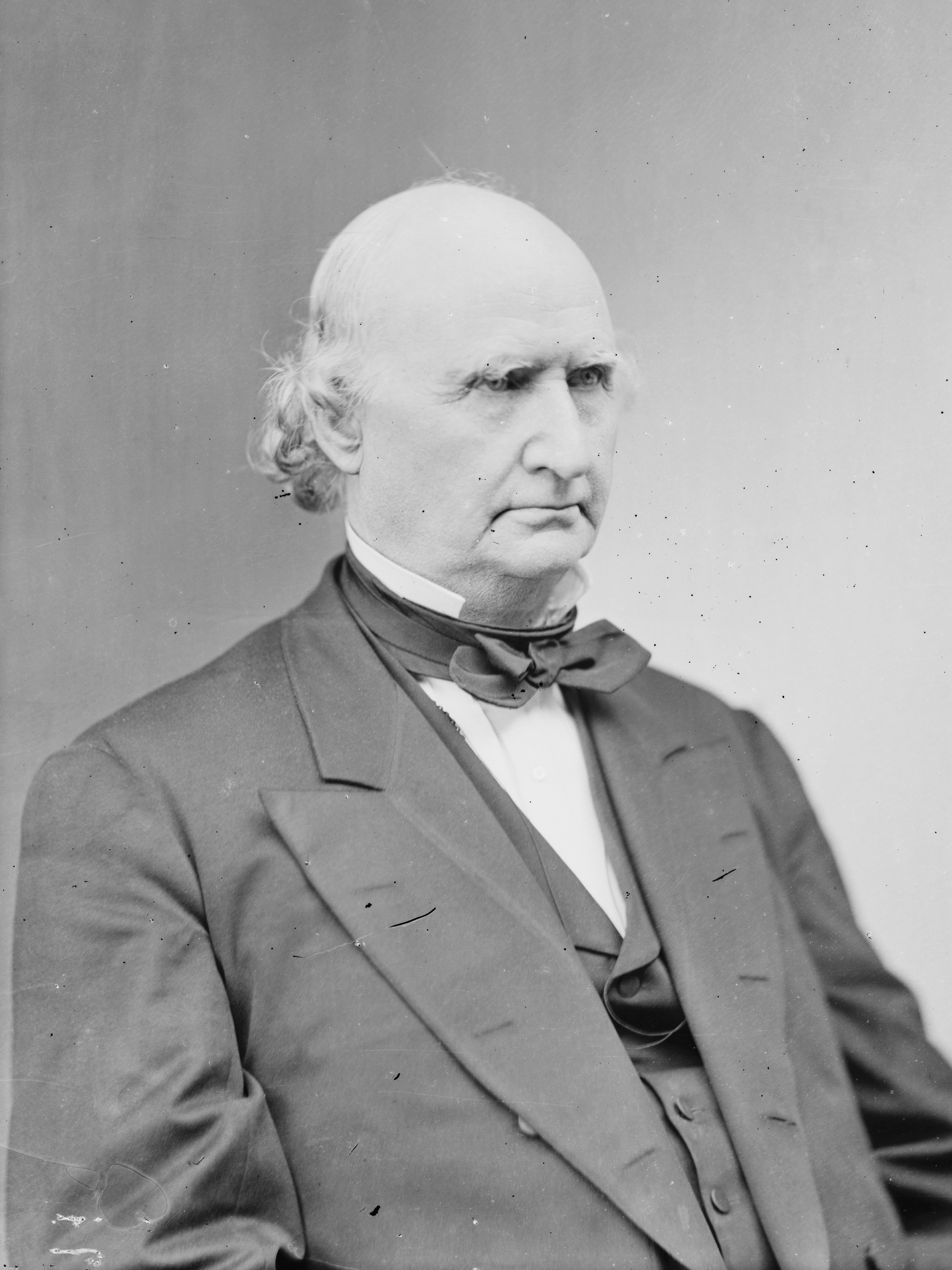
Ezra Bartlett French

Ezra Bartlett French (September 23, 1810 – April 24, 1880) was a United States representative from Maine. He was born in Landaff, New Hampshire where he attended the common schools and pursued an academic course. Later, he studied law in Bath and Plymouth, New Hampshire and was admitted to the bar in 1833. He commenced practice in Portland and Waldoboro, Maine. Later, he moved to Nobleboro, Maine (present-day Damariscotta), and continued practice.

French was a member of the Maine House of Representatives 1838–1840 and served in the Maine Senate 1842–1845. He was the Secretary of State of Maine 1845–1850. He also was bank commissioner and worked as a newspaper editor in 1856. He assisted in organizing the Republican Party in 1856.

French was elected as a Republican to the Thirty-sixth Congress (March 4, 1859 – March 3, 1861) but was not a candidate for renomination in 1860. He served as a member of the peace convention of 1861 held in Washington, D.C., in an effort to devise means to prevent the impending American Civil War. He was appointed Second Auditor of the Treasury August 3, 1861, by President Abraham Lincoln, and continued during the administrations of Presidents Andrew Johnson, Ulysses S. Grant, and Rutherford B. Hayes, serving until his death in Washington, D.C., in 1880. He was buried in Hillside Cemetery, Damariscotta, Maine.

Political offices
Preceded by William B. Hartwell	Secretary of State of Maine; 1846–1849	Succeeded by John G. Sawyer
U.S. House of Representatives
Preceded by Nehemiah Abbott	Member of the U.S. House of Representatives from Maine's 3rd congressional district March 4, 1859 – March 3, 1861	Succeeded by Samuel C. Fessenden
