= Hiram Belcher =

American politician (1790–1857)

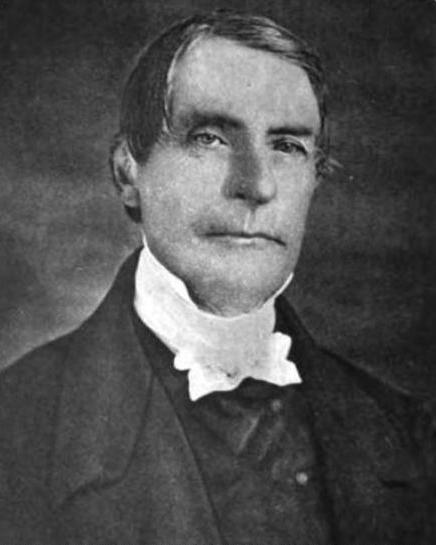

Member of the U.S. House of Representatives from Maine's 3rd district
- In office March 4, 1847 – March 3, 1849
- Preceded by: Luther Severance
- Succeeded by: John Otis

Member of the Maine House of Representatives
- In office 1822, 1829, 1832

Personal details
- Born: February 23, 1790 Hallowell, Massachusetts, U.S.
- Died: May 6, 1857 (aged 67) Farmington, Maine, U.S.
- Resting place: Center Meeting House Cemetery
- Party: Whig
- Parent: Supply Belcher (father)
- Profession: Politician, lawyer

Hiram Belcher (February 23, 1790 – May 6, 1857) was a United States representative from Maine. He was born in Hallowell, Massachusetts (now in Maine) on February 23, 1790. He attended the rural schools and the local academy in town. Belcher studied law, was admitted to the bar and commenced practice in Farmington in 1812.

Belcher was elected town clerk of the community and served from 1814 to 1819; member of the Maine House of Representatives in 1822, 1829, and 1832; served in the Maine State Senate. He was elected as a Whig to the Thirtieth Congress (March 4, 1847 – March 3, 1849). He was chairman of the Committee on Mileage. He was not a candidate for reelection. He re-engaged in the practice of his profession until his death in Farmington on May 6, 1857. His interment was in Center Meeting House Cemetery.

He was the son of Supply Belcher.

U.S. House of Representatives
Preceded by Luther Severance	Member of the U.S. House of Representatives from Maine's 3rd congressional district 1847–1849	Succeeded by John Otis
