= John Otis (Maine politician) =

American politician (1801–1856)

Member of the U.S. House of Representatives from Maine's 3rd district
- In office March 4, 1849 – March 3, 1851
- Preceded by: Hiram Belcher
- Succeeded by: Robert Goodenow

Member of the Maine House of Representatives
- In office 1841, 1846–1847

Member of the Maine Senate
- In office 1842

Personal details
- Born: August 3, 1801 Leeds, Massachusetts, U.S.
- Died: October 17, 1856 (aged 55) Hallowell, Maine, U.S.
- Resting place: Hallowell Cemetery, Hallowell, Maine, U.S.
- Party: Whig
- Education: Bowdoin College
- Profession: Politician, lawyer

John Otis (August 3, 1801 – October 17, 1856) was a U.S. representative from Maine.

Coat of Arms of John Otis

Born in Leeds, Massachusetts (now in Maine), Otis attended the common schools, and graduated from Bowdoin College, Brunswick, Maine, in 1823. He studied law. He was admitted to the bar and commenced practice in Hallowell, Maine, in 1826. He served as member of the State House of Representatives in 1841. He was appointed a member of the Northeastern Boundary Commission in 1842. He served in the State Senate in 1842. He was again a member of the State House of Representatives in 1846 and 1847. He was elected as a Whig to the 31st United States Congress (March 4, 1849 – March 3, 1851). He died in Hallowell, Maine, October 17, 1856. He was interred in Hallowell Cemetery.

U.S. House of Representatives
Preceded by Hiram Belcher	Member of the U.S. House of Representatives from Maine's 3rd congressional district 1849–1851	Succeeded by Robert Goodenow
