= Thomas L. L. Brent =

American diplomat

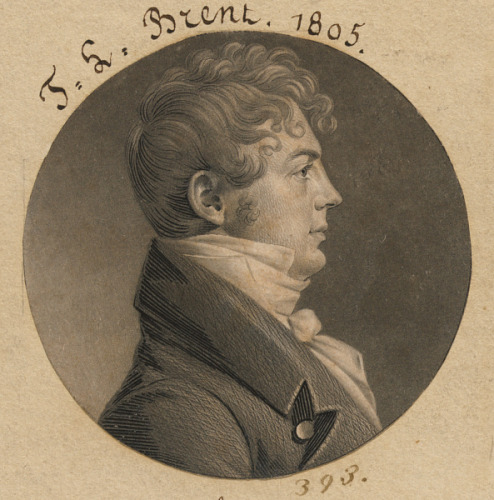
- Brent in 1805

United States Chargé d'Affaires to Portugal
- In office March 9, 1825 – November 1834
- President: John Quincy Adams; Andrew Jackson
- Preceded by: Henry Dearborn
- Succeeded by: Edward Kavanagh

Personal details
- Born: August 9, 1784 Stafford County, Virginia, U.S.
- Died: 1845 (aged 60–61) Michigan, U.S.

Thomas Ludwell Lee Brent (August 9, 1784 – 1845) was an American diplomat. He was born in Virginia. He worked as a part of the United States diplomatic service in Spain and Portugal. After this, he became a notable landholder in Michigan.

== Early life ==
Thomas Ludwell Lee Brent was born on August 9, 1784, in Stafford County, Virginia. His father was Daniel Brent. He was a nephew of U. S. senator Richard Brent.

== Career ==
=== Diplomatic career ===
Brent was appointed as a clerk for the U.S. state department by Secretary of State Robert Smith in 1811. On October 15, 1814, Brent was commissioned by President James Madison as secretary for the U.S. legation to Spain. He resigned as clerk in November.

Brent arrived in Madrid in May 1815, and had his official status recognized by the Spanish government on August 28. Brent was in charge of the legation until George W. Erving presented his credentials to the government in August 1816. After Erving left his post in April 1819, Brent took charge as interim chargé d'affairs until May 18, 1819, when John Forsyth presented his credentials.

In May 1822, President James Monroe commissioned Brent as secretary of the U.S. legation in Portugal. In June 1823, he was appointed by President Monroe as U.S. consul in Cádiz. He left Spain August. He served as interim chargé d'affairs of the legation to Portugal starting in June 1824. On March 9, 1825, Brent was appointed as full chargé d'affairs by President John Quincy Adams. He presented his credentials on June 24, 1825. He was re-accredited on January 18, 1830, after a change of government. He served in this post until late November 1834.

=== Michigan land holdings ===
After his career in the diplomatic service, Brent, along with his wife, settled in Flushing Township, Michigan. According to Edwin Orin Wood, he was one the most prominent early settlers of the locality. Brent was one of several eastern and southern capitalists to buy large amounts of land in the new western states in the 1830s. In 1836, Brent bought around 70,000 acres of government land in Genesee and Saginaw County. Many of the early settlers of the township worked on Brent's estate at some point.

Brent had sunk a large portion of money into the land purchases, and as such had little to pay taxes on the land or to pay for improvements of it. Brent is noted to have refused to sell his land, until his expenditures required him to sell portions of it. By the time of his death, he was considered land-poor.

== Personal life ==
Brent was married to a Spanish woman. Some sources claim Brent married the woman before his career in the diplomatic service, while others claim he met her on said diplomatic service. Together they had two children, Charlotte M. and Henry Lee. They were both born around the 1820s.

== Death and legacy ==
Brent died in 1845. His son, Henry, did not take an interest in his father's estate, instead focusing on the construction of musical instruments.

Brent Creek, a hamlet in Flushing Township, is named for Thomas L. L. Brent.
