= Stephen Lindsey =

American politician (1828–1884)

Stephen Decatur Lindsey
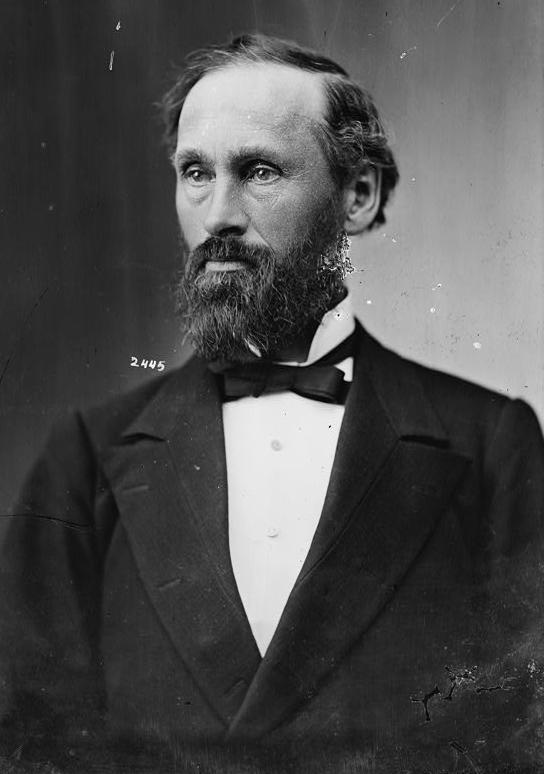

Member of the U.S. House of Representatives from Maine's 3rd district
- In office March 4, 1877 – March 3, 1883
- Preceded by: Edwin Flye
- Succeeded by: Charles A. Boutelle

President of the Maine Senate
- In office 1869–1870
- Preceded by: Josiah Crosby
- Succeeded by: William W. Bolster

Member of the Maine Senate from Somerset County
- In office 1868–1870 Serving with Isaac Dyer (1868), Luther H. Webb (1869–1870)
- Preceded by: Henry Boynton, Isaac Dyer
- Succeeded by: Franklin R. Webber, Moses French

Member of the Maine House of Representatives from Norridgewock, Mercer, and Smithfield
- In office 1856–1857
- Preceded by: Alvinzy Whitcomb
- Succeeded by: Martin L. Burr

Personal details
- Born: March 3, 1828 Norridgewock, Maine, United States
- Died: April 26, 1884 (aged 56) Norridgewock, Maine, United States
- Party: Republican
- Spouse(s): Sarah Townsend; Mary Clark
- Children: 6
- Profession: Attorney

Stephen Decatur Lindsey (March 3, 1828 – April 26, 1884) was an American attorney and politician from Maine. A Republican, he served terms in the Maine House of Representatives and Maine Senate. In 1876, he was elected to the United States House of Representatives. He was reelected in 1878 and served from 1877 to 1883.

== Early life ==
Stephen D. Lindsey was born in Norridgewock, Maine, on March 3, 1828, the son of schoolteacher Melzar Lindsey and Melinda (Cannon) Lindsey. He attended the local schools of Norridgewock and Bloomfield Academy, where his instructors included Stephen Coburn, with whom he developed a lifelong friendship.

After graduating from Bloomfield Academy, Lindsey studied law with Norridewock attorney John S. Abbott, who later served as Maine Attorney General, and he attained admission to the bar in 1853. Lindsey then purchased Abbott's office and began to practice in Norridewock. In addition to practicing law, Lindsey was active in several businesses, including serving as president of the Madison Woolen Mill and member of the board of directors for the Somerset Railroad.

== Career ==
Lindsey became active in politics as a Republican, and served in the Maine House of Representatives in 1856. He was clerk of the judicial courts of Somerset County from 1857 to 1860. In addition, he was a delegate to the 1860 Republican National Convention.

Lindsey served in the Maine Senate from 1868 to 1870, and was the senate's president pro tempore in 1869. He was a delegate to the 1868 Republican National Convention, and served on the Executive Council of Maine in 1874.

In 1876, Lindsey was elected to the United States House of Representatives. He was reelected in 1878, and served from March 4, 1877 to March 3, 1883. He was not a candidate for renomination in 1882, and resumed practicing law in Norridewock. While serving in Congress, Lindsey was a member of the: Joint Committee on the Library; Select Committee on the Payment of Pensions, Bounty, and Back Pay; and Committee on Expenditures in the Department of State.

In 1877, Lindsey administered a competitive examination for Congressional appointment to the United States Military Academy (West Point). The top score was attained by Charles L. Phillips of Waterville, whom Lindsey subsequently appointed. Phillips graduated in 1881, served in the United States Army until 1920, and attained the rank of brigadier general.

== Death and burial ==
Lindsey died in Norridgewock on April 26, 1884. He was interred at River View Cemetery in Norridgewock.

== Family ==
Lindsey's first wife was Sarah Townsend of Norridewock. She died in 1867, and he later married Mary Clark, also of Norridewock. With his first wife, Lindsey was the father of five children, three daughters and two sons; he was the father of a daughter with his second wife.

U.S. House of Representatives
Preceded by Edwin Flye	Member of the U.S. House of Representatives from Maine's 3rd congressional district March 4, 1877 – March 3, 1883	Succeeded by Charles A. Boutelle
