= Edwin Flye =

American politician (1817–1886)

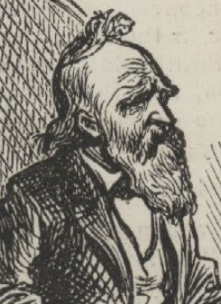

Member of the U.S. House of Representatives from Maine's 3rd district
- In office December 4, 1876 – March 3, 1877
- Preceded by: James G. Blaine
- Succeeded by: Stephen Lindsey

Member of the Maine House of Representatives
- In office 1858

Personal details
- Born: March 4, 1817 Newcastle, Massachusetts, U.S.
- Died: July 12, 1886 (aged 69) Ashland, Kentucky, U.S.
- Party: Republican

Military service
- Branch/service: Union Army
- Battles/wars: American Civil War

Edwin Flye (March 4, 1817 – July 12, 1886) was an American politician, merchant, banker, bank president, and shipbuilder from Maine.

== Early life ==
Born in Newcastle, Massachusetts (now in Maine), Flye attended the common schools and Lincoln Academy.

== Career ==
Flye engaged in mercantile pursuits and shipbuilding. He was a member of the Maine House of Representatives in 1858 and served as president of the First National Bank of Damariscotta, Maine, for many years.

During the Civil War, Flye served as a paymaster with the rank of major in the Union Army. He was a delegate to the Republican National Convention in 1876 and was elected as a Republican to the United States House of Representatives to fill a vacancy the same year. He served until 1877. He was not a candidate for renomination in 1876 and instead resumed shipbuilding and banking.

== Personal life ==
Flye died while visiting the home of his daughter in Ashland, Kentucky, on July 12, 1886. He was interred in Congregational Cemetery in Newcastle, Maine.

U.S. House of Representatives
Preceded by James G. Blaine	Member of the U.S. House of Representatives from Maine's 3rd congressional district December 4, 1876 – March 3, 1877	Succeeded by Stephen D. Lindsey
