= Benjamin Randall (Maine politician) =

American politician (1789–1859)

Member of the U.S. House of Representatives from Maine's 3rd district
- In office March 4, 1839 – March 3, 1843
- Preceded by: Edward Robinson
- Succeeded by: Luther Severance

Member of the Maine Senate
- In office 1833, 1835, 1838

Personal details
- Born: November 14, 1789 Topsham, Massachusetts, U.S.
- Died: October 11, 1859 (aged 69) Bath, Maine, U.S.
- Resting place: Maple Grove Cemetery, Bath, Maine, U.S.
- Party: Whig
- Education: Bowdoin College
- Profession: Politician, lawyer

Military service
- Allegiance: United States

Benjamin Randall (November 14, 1789 – October 11, 1859) was a United States representative from Maine from 1839 to 1843.

== Early life ==
Randall was born in Topsham (then part of Massachusetts) on November 14, 1789. He pursued an academic course and graduated from Bowdoin College in 1809. He studied law and was admitted to the bar in 1812.

== Career ==
Randall commenced practice in Bath in 1812. He served in the Maine State militia in Colonel Reed’s regiment stationed at Cox's Head in September 1814. He was a member of the Maine Senate in 1833, 1835, and 1838. He was elected as a Whig to the Twenty-sixth and Twenty-seventh Congresses (March 4, 1839 – March 3, 1843).

Upon his return to Maine, he resumed the practice of law and was appointed collector of customs for the port of Bath in 1849. He served until his death there on October 11, 1859. His interment is in Maple Grove Cemetery in Bath.

U.S. House of Representatives
Preceded by Edward Robinson	Member of the U.S. House of Representatives from Maine's 3rd congressional district 1839–1843	Succeeded by Luther Severance
