= Robert Goodenow =

American politician

Member of the U.S. House of Representatives from Maine's 3rd district
- In office March 4, 1851 – March 3, 1853
- Preceded by: John Otis
- Succeeded by: E. Wilder Farley

Personal details
- Born: April 19, 1800 Henniker, New Hampshire, U.S.
- Died: May 15, 1874 (aged 74) Farmington, Maine, U.S.
- Party: Whig Party
- Relatives: Rufus K. Goodenow (brother)

Robert Goodenow (April 19, 1800 – May 15, 1874) was a U.S. representative from Maine, brother of Rufus King Goodenow.

Born in Henniker, New Hampshire, Goodenow moved with his parents to Brownfield, Maine, in 1802. He attended the common schools at that place and at Sanford in 1815 and 1816. He studied medicine and law. He was admitted to the bar in 1822 and commenced practice in Wilton, Maine. He moved to Farmington, Maine, in 1832 and continued the practice of law. Goodenow was county attorney from 1828 to 1834.

Goodenow was elected as a Whig to the Thirty-second Congress (March 4, 1851 – March 3, 1853). He was an unsuccessful candidate for renomination. He was appointed State Bank Commissioner in 1857. He was County Treasurer of Franklin County 1866–1868, then again County Attorney in 1869 and 1870, as well as Treasurer of Franklin County Savings Bank 1868–1874.

He died in Farmington, May 15, 1874 and was interred in Riverside Cemetery.

U.S. House of Representatives
Preceded by John Otis	Member of the U.S. House of Representatives from Maine's 3rd congressional district March 4, 1851 – March 3, 1853	Succeeded by E. Wilder Farley
