= Malik Taylor =

American football player (born 1995)

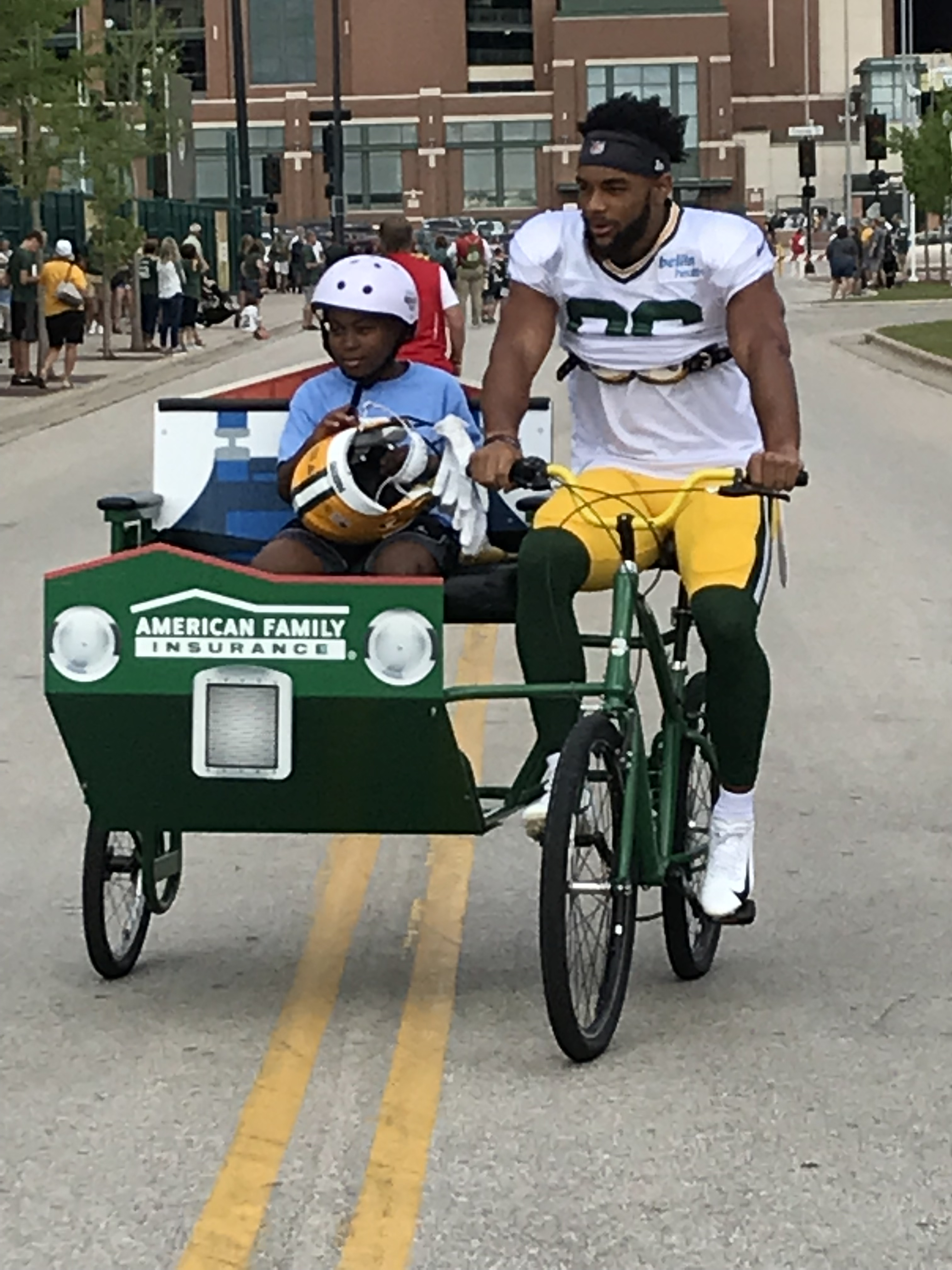
- Taylor (right) in 2019

Profile
- Position: Wide receiver

Personal information
- Born: December 21, 1995 (age 30); Flint, Michigan, U.S.
- Listed height: 6 ft 1 in (1.85 m)
- Listed weight: 220 lb (100 kg)

Career information
- High school: Hill-McCloy (Montrose, Michigan)
- College: Ferris State (2014–2017)
- NFL draft: 2019: undrafted

Career history
- Tampa Bay Buccaneers (2019)*; Green Bay Packers (2019–2022); New York Jets (2022–2024); Detroit Lions (2025)*
- * Offseason or practice squad member only

Career NFL statistics as of 2023
- Receptions: 9
- Receiving yards: 93
- Receiving touchdowns: 1
- Rushing yards: 9
- Return yards: 264
- Stats at Pro Football Reference

Malik Taylor (born December 21, 1995) is an American professional football wide receiver. He played college football for Ferris State.

== College career ==
Taylor finished his college career with 121 receptions and 2,091 yards. Taylor received All-GLIAC honors his junior season but suffered a season ending injury his senior year.

== Professional career ==
Pre-draft measurables
Height	Weight	Arm length	Hand span	40-yard dash	10-yard split	20-yard split	20-yard shuttle	Three-cone drill	Vertical jump	Broad jump	Bench press
6 ft 1 3/8 in (1.86 m)	211 lb (96 kg)	31 7/8 in (0.81 m)	9 1/2 in (0.24 m)	4.46 s	1.66 s	2.64 s	4.04 s	6.81 s	36.0 in (0.91 m)	10 ft 6 in (3.20 m)	11 reps
All values from Pro Day

=== Tampa Bay Buccaneers ===
After going undrafted, Taylor signed with the Tampa Bay Buccaneers on April 27. Taylor was waived on May 14, 2019.

=== Green Bay Packers ===
On July 19, 2019, Taylor signed with the Green Bay Packers. Taylor was waived on August 31 and signed to the practice squad on September 1.

On September 5, 2020, it was announced Taylor had made the 53-man roster. Taylor made his NFL debut Week 1 against the Minnesota Vikings. Taylor pulled in his first career reception for 20 yards on a 4th down against the Atlanta Falcons in Week 4. Taylor caught his first touchdown in Week 7 against the Houston Texans.

On May 21, 2021, Taylor signed a one-year exclusive-rights free agent tender with the Packers. He was placed on injured reserve on December 24. He signed his tender offer from the Packers on April 18, 2022, to keep him with the team. He was waived/injured on August 17, 2022 and placed on injured reserve. He was released on September 15.

=== New York Jets ===
On December 29, 2022, Taylor was signed to the New York Jets practice squad. He signed a reserve/future contract on January 9, 2023. He was waived on August 29, 2023, and re-signed to the practice squad on September 12. Taylor was elevated to the active roster on November 6. He signed a reserve/future contract on January 8, 2024. He was placed on injured reserve on August 18, 2024.

=== Detroit Lions ===
On May 12, 2025, Taylor signed with the Detroit Lions. He was released on August 26 as part of final roster cuts.

== NFL career statistics ==
=== Regular season ===
Year	Team	Games		Receiving					Fumbles	
Year	Team	GP	GS	Rec	Yds	Avg	Lng	TD	Fum	Lost
2020	GB	15	1	5	66	13.2	26	1	0	0
2021	GB	10	0	2	14	7.0	7	0	1	1
2022	GB	0	0	—	DNP					
2023	NYJ	3	0	2	13	6.5	7	0	0	0
Total		28	1	9	93	8.9	26	1	1	1
Source: pro-football-reference.com
