= Jonathan Cilley =

American politician (1802–1838)

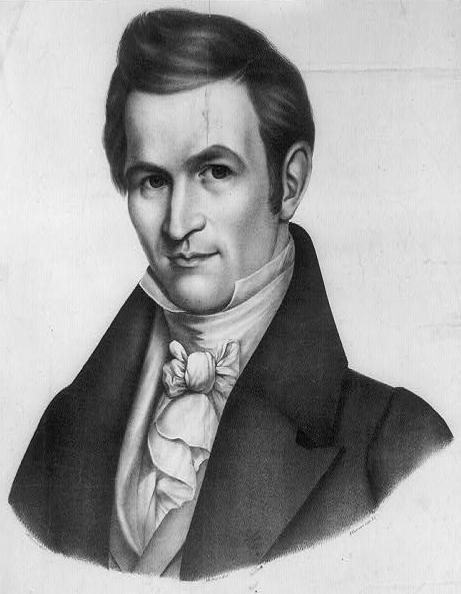

Member of the U.S. House of Representatives from Maine's 3rd district
- In office March 4, 1837 – February 24, 1838
- Preceded by: Jeremiah Bailey
- Succeeded by: Edward Robinson

Speaker of the Maine House of Representatives
- In office 1835–1836
- Preceded by: Thomas Davee
- Succeeded by: Hannibal Hamlin

Member of the Maine House of Representatives
- In office 1831–1836

Personal details
- Born: July 2, 1802 Nottingham, New Hampshire, U.S.
- Died: February 24, 1838 (aged 35) Bladensburg, Maryland, U.S.
- Resting place: Elm Grove Cemetery; Thomaston, Maine, U.S.
- Party: Democratic
- Spouse: Deborah Prince
- Children: 5
- Education: Bowdoin College (BA)

Jonathan Cilley (July 2, 1802 – February 24, 1838) was a member of the U.S. House of Representatives from Maine. He served part of one term in the 25th Congress, and died as the result of a wound sustained in a duel with another congressman, William J. Graves of Kentucky.

Cilley was a native of Nottingham, New Hampshire, and was educated at Atkinson Academy and Bowdoin College. He settled in Thomaston, Maine, where he studied law and attained admission to the bar in addition to editing the Thomaston Register newspaper. A Democrat, Cilley served in the Maine House of Representatives from 1831 to 1836, and was Speaker in 1835 and 1836.

In 1836, Cilley was elected to the United States House of Representatives. He served part of one term and died as the result of a gunshot wound caused when he engaged in a duel with Representative William J. Graves. They fired at each other with rifles three times, and on the third shot, Graves hit Cilley's femoral artery, causing blood loss, which resulted in Cilley's death. He was temporarily interred at Congressional Cemetery and later reinterred at Elm Grove Cemetery in Thomaston.

== Early life ==
Jonathan Cilley was born in Nottingham, New Hampshire, and was the son of Jane (Nealley) Cilley and Greenleaf Cilley. He was the brother of Joseph Cilley, grandson of Major General Joseph Cilley, and nephew of Bradbury Cilley.

Cilley attended Atkinson Academy and Bowdoin College. He was a member of Bowdoin's famed class of 1825, which included Nathaniel Hawthorne and Henry Wadsworth Longfellow. While at Bowdoin, Cilley also became close friends with future U.S. President Franklin Pierce, a member of the class of 1824. Deciding to stay in Maine after graduating from Bowdoin, Cilley studied law with John Ruggles, was admitted to the bar in 1828, and practiced in Thomaston.

== Marriage and political career ==
In 1829, Jonathan Cilley married Deborah Prince, the daughter of local businessman Hezekiah Prince. Jonathan and Deborah had five children, two of whom died very young. Their surviving children were Greenleaf (b. 1829), Jonathan Prince (b. 1835), and Julia (b. 1837). Jonathan Prince Cilley became a brigadier general by brevet in the Union Army during the Civil War. Greenleaf was a career officer in the United States Navy. He married Malvina Vernet, the daughter of Luis Vernet, a former Argentinian governor of the Falkland Islands in Montevideo, Uruguay in 1861 and died in San Isidro, Buenos Aires in 1899. Julia was the wife of Ellis Draper Lazell (1832–1875).

Cilley edited the Thomaston Register from 1829 to 1831 and represented Thomaston in the Maine House of Representatives from 1831 to 1836, serving as Speaker in his final two years. He was then elected to the United States Congress, but did not complete his first term.

== Fatal duel ==
Cilley died in office after sustaining a fatal wound in a duel with Congressman William J. Graves of Kentucky. The climate surrounding the Twenty-fifth U.S. Congress was one of increasing political partisanship. Majority Democrats fought with minority Whigs over the response to the Panic of 1837, which was generally blamed on the policies of Democratic President Martin Van Buren. Underlying this conflict was lingering bitterness over the decision of Van Buren's predecessor, Democrat Andrew Jackson, not to re-charter the Second Bank of the United States. One of the pillars of the Whig press was the New York Courier and Enquirer, a newspaper edited by James Watson Webb.

Democrats, including Jonathan Cilley, considered Webb's coverage of Congress to be biased and unfair; Cilley vented some of his party's bitterness in remarks made on the House floor, and suggested that Webb's change from opposing to supporting the re-chartering of the bank came about because Webb received loans from the bank totaling $52,000. Webb, who considered himself insulted by Cilley's suggestion of quid pro quo corruption, persuaded a Whig friend, Congressman William J. Graves, to deliver Webb's challenge to a duel. Cilley refused to accept the letter, in terms which Graves decided were an insult to his honor; Graves then challenged Cilley, and Cilley felt honor bound to accept. Dueling was prohibited within the boundaries of the District of Columbia, so the participants and their seconds – George Wallace Jones for Cilley and Henry A. Wise for Graves – arranged to meet on February 24, 1838, at the Bladensburg Dueling Grounds, just outside the city limits and inside the Maryland border.

As the challenged party, Cilley had the choice of weapons. Because of Graves' reputation as an expert pistol shot, Cilley selected rifles, with the distance between the duelists to be 80 yards, a distance far enough apart to negate Graves' supposed shooting skill; in actuality, the marked off distance was 94 yards. After their first fire missed, the participants shortened the distance and fired again, but again both shots missed. On the third exchange of shots, Graves fatally wounded Cilley by shooting him through the femoral artery. Cilley bled to death on the dueling ground within a matter of minutes.

Cilley's funeral in the House chamber was attended by the President, Vice President, the cabinet, and much of Congress; and the funeral procession to the Congressional Cemetery where he was buried extended for half a mile. He was re-interred at Elm Grove Cemetery in Thomaston, Maine.

== Legacy ==
There is a cenotaph to Cilley's memory located at Congressional Cemetery.

After Cilley's death, longtime friend Nathaniel Hawthorne published two biographical sketches of him. His colleagues paid tribute to him by passing a federal law on February 20, 1839, which strengthened the strict prohibition against dueling in Washington, D.C. by making it a crime to issue or accept a challenge within district limits, even if the actual duel was to take place outside the district.

== See also ==
- List of members of the United States Congress who died in office (1790–1899)
- List of members of the United States Congress killed or wounded in office

== Sources ==
- Anderson, Eve (2002). A Breach of Privilege: Cilley Family Letters, 1820–1867. Rockland, ME: Seven Coin Press. ISBN 978-0970097446.
- Franscell, Ron (2012). Crime Buff's Guide to Outlaw Washington, DC. Guilford, CT: Globe Pequot Press. ISBN 978-0-7627-7385-5.
- Freeman, Joanne B. (2018). The Field of Blood: Violence in Congress and the Road to Civil War. New York, NY: Picador. ISBN 9781250234582.
- Ginn, Roger (2016). New England Must Not Be Trampled On: The Tragic Death of Jonathan Cilley. Lanham, MD: Down East Books. ISBN 978-1-60893-388-4.
- Hastings, Hugh J.; Hastings, Hugh (September 17, 1886). Ancient American Politics. Franklin Square library; no. 543. New York, NY: Harper & Brothers.
- Lazell, Theodore Studley (1936). John Lazell of Hingham And Some Of His Descendants. Haverhill, MA: The Record Publishing Company.
- United States Congress (2005). Biographical Directory of the United States Congress, 1774–2005. Washington, DC: US Government Printing Office. ISBN 978-0-16-073176-1.
- White, J. T. (1900). The National Cyclopaedia of American Biography. Vol. X. New York, NY: James T. White & Company.

U.S. House of Representatives
Preceded by Jeremiah Bailey	Member of the U.S. House of Representatives from Maine's 3rd congressional district 1837–1838	Succeeded by Edward Robinson
