= Luther Severance =

American politician and diplomat

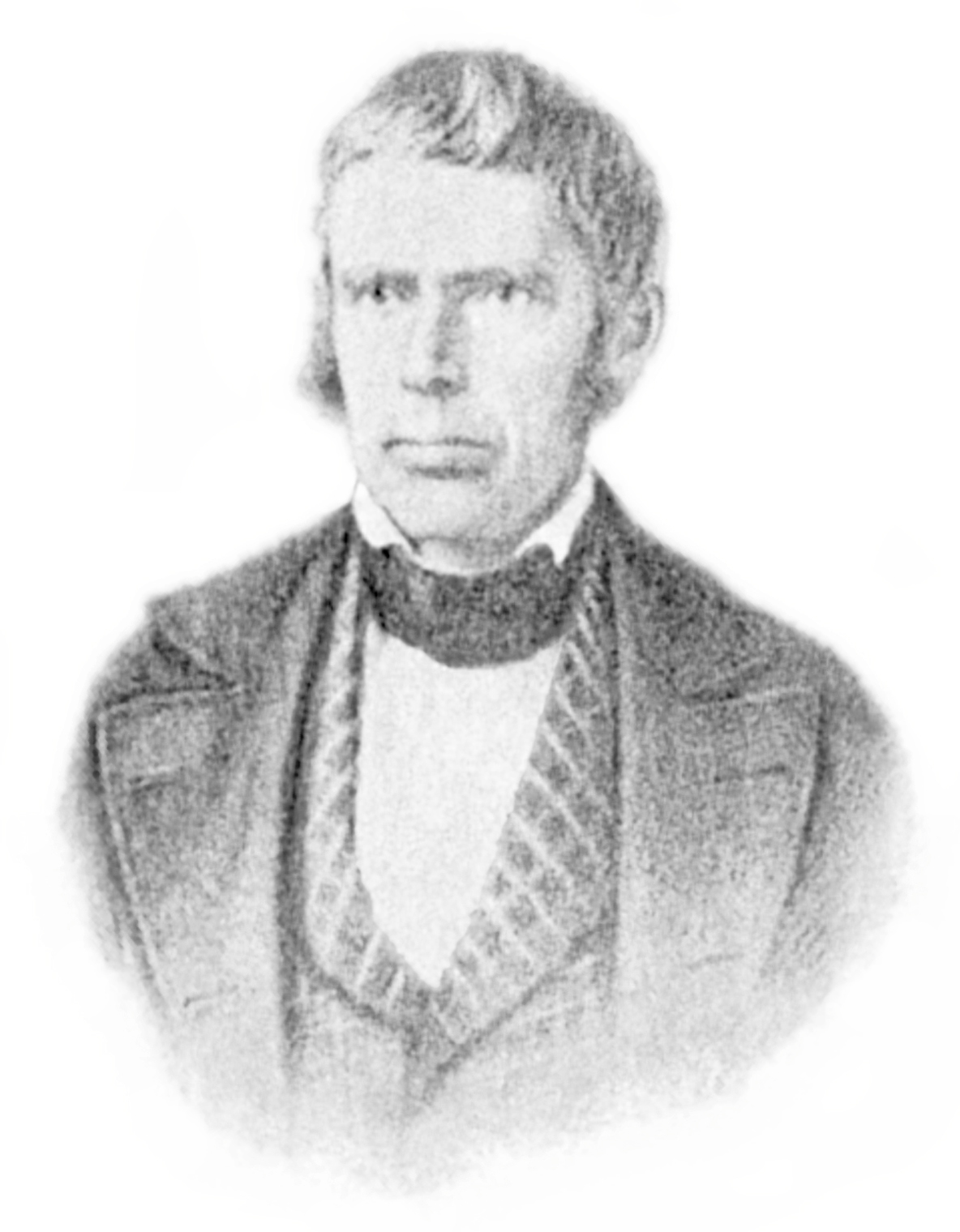

Member of the U.S. House of Representatives from Maine's 3rd district
- In office March 4, 1843 – March 3, 1847
- Preceded by: Benjamin Randall
- Succeeded by: Hiram Belcher

U.S. Commissioner to Hawaii
- In office June 7, 1850 – December 1853
- Preceded by: Charles Eames
- Succeeded by: David L. Gregg

Personal details
- Born: October 26, 1797 Montague, Massachusetts, U.S.
- Died: January 25, 1855 (aged 57) Augusta, Maine, U.S.
- Party: Whig

Luther Severance (October 26, 1797 – January 25, 1855) was a United States representative and diplomat from Maine.

== Life ==
He was born in Montague, Massachusetts on October 26, 1797. He moved with his parents to Cazenovia, New York in 1799. He attended the common schools, and learned the printer's trade in Peterboro, New York.

He established the Kennebec Journal in Augusta, Maine in 1825. He was elected a member of the Maine House of Representatives, and served in the Maine State Senate. He was elected as a Whig to the Twenty-eighth and Twenty-ninth Congresses in the United States House of Representatives (March 4, 1843–March 3, 1847).

He was vice president of the Whig National Convention in 1848. He served as United States commissioner (diplomatic rank similar to that of Ambassador) to the Kingdom of Hawaii 1850 through the end of 1853. He died in Augusta, Maine on January 25, 1855. His interment was in Forest Grove Cemetery.

== Family ==
Severance married Anna Hamlin (May 31, 1801 – April 2, 1887), daughter of Theophilus and Sarah Rockwood Hamlin, on October 12, 1827. They had three children:

1. Henry Weld Severance (July 12, 1828 – February 11, 1908), who married Hannah Swann Child. He became the Hawaiian Consul for San Francisco.
2. Anna Severance (April 12, 1831 – June 20, 1912), who married Marshal of the Kingdom of Hawaii William Cooper Parke
3. Luther Severance (June 1, 1836 – July 8, 1917), who married Lucinda Maria Clark, daughter of Ephraim Weston Clark. He settled in Honolulu and later Hilo where he served as Postmaster of Hilo

U.S. House of Representatives
Preceded by Benjamin Randall	Member of the U.S. House of Representatives from Maine's 3rd congressional district March 4, 1843 – March 3, 1847	Succeeded by Hiram Belcher
Diplomatic posts
Preceded by Charles Eames	U.S. Commissioner to Hawaii; June 7, 1850–December 1853	Succeeded by David L. Gregg
