= Jeremiah Bailey =

American politician

- Born: May 1, 1773; Little Compton, Colony of Rhode Island and Providence Plantations, British America
- Died: July 6, 1853 (aged 80)
- Education: Brown University
- Occupation: United States Representative

Jeremiah Bailey (May 1, 1773 – July 6, 1853) was a United States representative from Maine. He was born in Little Compton, Rhode Island on May 1, 1773. He attended the common schools and graduated from Brown University in 1794. He studied law, was admitted to the bar and commenced practice in Wiscasset, Maine. (Until 1820, Maine was a district of Massachusetts.)

He was a presidential elector on the Federalist ticket in 1808. He was a member of the general court 1811–1814; judge of probate 1816–1834; elected as an Anti-Jacksonian to the Twenty-fourth Congress (March 4, 1835 – March 3, 1837). He was an unsuccessful candidate for reelection in 1836 to the Twenty-fifth Congress.

As a member of the Whig Party, he was appointed collector of customs of Wiscasset 1849–1853, and died there July 6, 1853. His interment was in Evergreen Cemetery.

U.S. House of Representatives
Preceded by Edward Kavanaugh	Member of the U.S. House of Representatives from Maine's 3rd congressional district March 4, 1835–March 3, 1837	Succeeded by Jonathan Cilley
