= Joseph F. Wingate =

American politician

Member of the U.S. House of Representatives from Maine's 3rd district
- In office March 4, 1827 – March 3, 1831
- Preceded by: Ebenezer Herrick
- Succeeded by: Edward Kavanagh

Member of the Massachusetts House of Representatives
- In office 1818–1819

Personal details
- Born: Joseph Ferdinand Wingate; June 29, 1786 Haverhill, Massachusetts, U.S.
- Died: Windsor, Maine, U.S.
- Resting place: Rest Haven Cemetery
- Party: Anti-Jacksonian
- Other political affiliations: Adams
- Spouse: Margaret Gay Tingey (m. 1808)
- Children: 1
- Parent(s): Joshua Wingate; Hannah Carr Wingate

Joseph Ferdinand Wingate (June 29, 1786 – unknown), son of Joshua and Hannah Carr Wingate, was a U.S. representative from Maine.

Born in Haverhill, Massachusetts, Wingate received a limited schooling. He engaged in the mercantile business in Bath, Maine, until 1820, part of Massachusetts, District of Maine. He married Margaret Gay Tingey, daughter of Commodore Thomas Tingey, USN, in 1808. He served as member of the Massachusetts House of Representatives, 1818 and 1819. He served as collector of customs at the port of Bath from 1820 to 1824.

Wingate was elected to the Twentieth and Twenty-first Congresses (March 4, 1827 – March 3, 1831). Wingate's uncle, Paine Wingate, was a U.S. Representative, U.S. Senator, and Justice of the Supreme Court, all of New Hampshire. Joseph Wingate moved eventually to Windsor, Maine. His daughter, Sydney Ellen Wingate, married George P. Sewall.

U.S. House of Representatives
Preceded by Ebenezer Herrick	Member of the U.S. House of Representatives from Maine's 3rd congressional district 1827–1831	Succeeded by Edward Kavanaugh
