= Flushing Township, Michigan =

Flushing Township
- Charter township
- Charter Township of Flushing
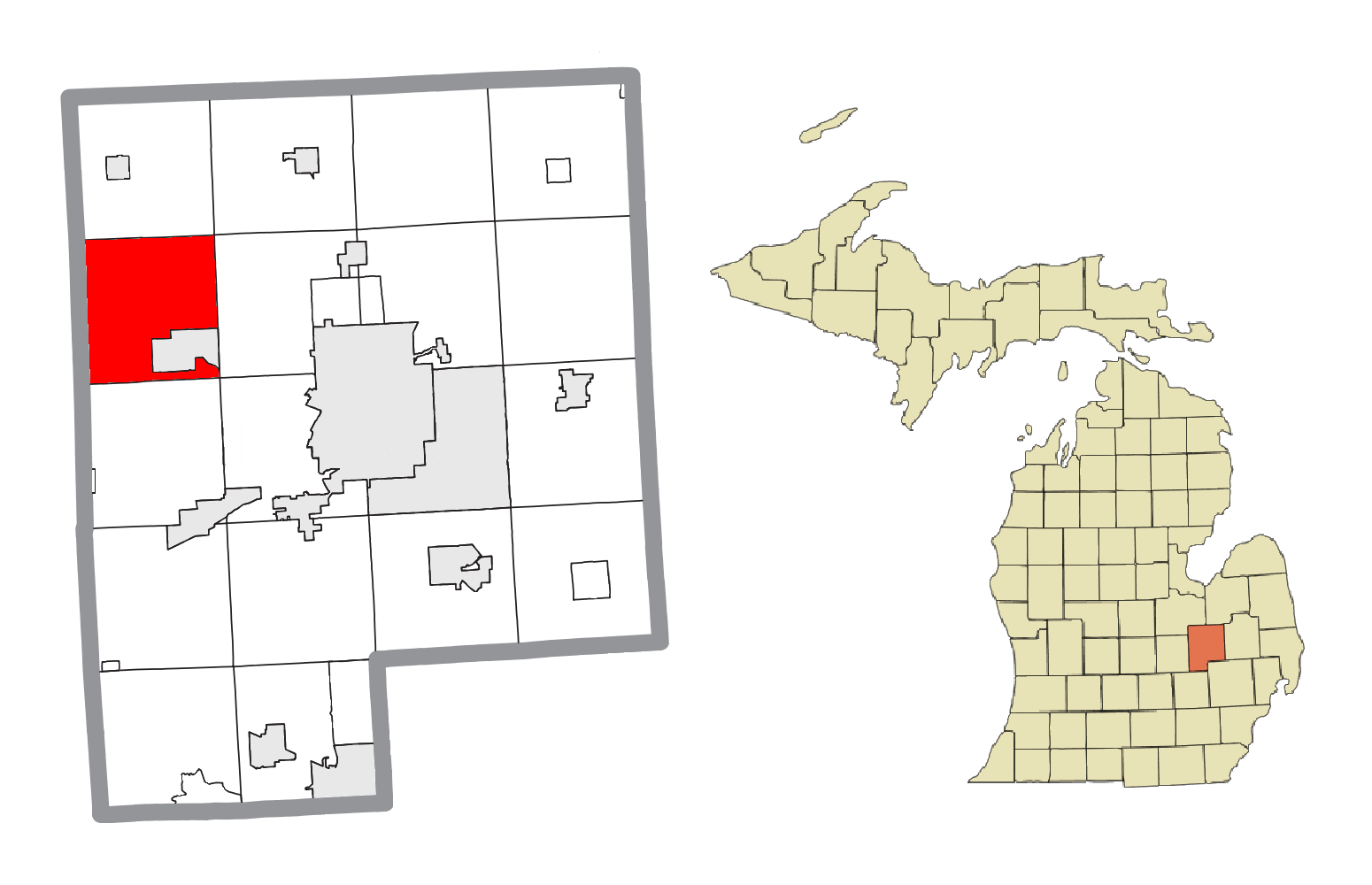
- Location within Genesee County

- Location within the state of Michigan
- Coordinates: 43°05′49″N 83°51′29″W
- Country: United States
- State: Michigan
- County: Genesee
- Settled: 1835
- Organized: 1838
- Chartered: 1990

Government
  - Supervisor: Fred Thorsby
  - Clerk: Wendy Meinburg
  - Treasurer: Terry Peck

Area
  - Total: 31.0 sq mi (80.3 km^{2})
  - Land: 30.8 sq mi (79.9 km^{2})
  - Water: 0.15 sq mi (0.4 km^{2}) 0.48%
- Elevation: 699 ft (213 m)

Population (2020)
  - Total: 10,701
  - Density: 347/sq mi (134/km^{2})
- Time zone: UTC-5 (EST)
  - Summer (DST): UTC-4 (EDT)
- ZIP code(s): 48433 (Flushing)
- Area code: 810
- FIPS code: 26-29220
- GNIS feature ID: 1626290
- Website: www.flushingtownship.com

Flushing Charter Township is a charter township of Genesee County in the U.S. state of Michigan. The population was 10,701 at the 2020 census. Flushing Township was rated the 63rd safest community in America with a population over 10,000 by SafeWise, a home security and safety brand, in 2017.

== Communities ==
- Brent Creek is a small community within the township at 43°07′04″N 83°53′12″W on Mt. Morris Road between Nichols Road and Seymour Road. Retiring after twenty years of U.S. diplomatic service in Spain and Portugal, Thomas Ludwell Lee Brent, a nephew of Virginia Congressman and Senator Richard Brent and grandson of Virginia colonial statesman Thomas Ludwell Lee, bought a large tract of land here and settled on it. In 1837, his workers built a mill on the Charlotte Creek, which was named for his daughter, but was later renamed Brent Creek. A post office named Brent Creek was established on November 2, 1888 with Frank J. Browne as the first postmaster. The spelling was changed to Brentcreek on June 25, 1894.

== History ==
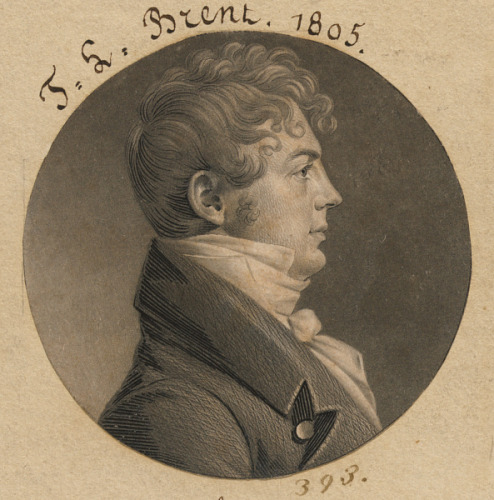
Thomas L. L. Brent

In the fall of 1835, Rufus Harrison was the first settler in the future Flushing Township. Flint Township was organized in 1836 and included the township areas of Burton, Clayton, Flushing, Mt. Morris, Genesee, Thetford, Vienna and Montrose. Genesee and Flushing Townships were split off on March 6, 1838. Flushing Township originally included survey townships of 7 & 8 North in Range 5 East and the west half of 7 & 8 North in Range 6 East. At a meeting at Ezekiel R. Ewing's house, Dover was proposed by Ebenezer French as the township's name. However, since another Dover Township already existed in the state, the Michigan legislature chose Flushing. With a loss of early records, only the identity of the first clerk, Abiel C. Bliss, is known. In October, 1838, the Township was divided into five school districts and appointed two school inspectors, Abiel C. Bliss and Jarvis Bailey.

Thomas L. L. Brent was a prominent early settler coming before 1836 and purchased up to 70,000 acres (280 km^{2}) of Michigan land. He built a saw mill and dam, which was destroyed by a freshet, in Section 3 on the Flint River. He thus found the Brent Creek community.

In the 1840, the "English Settlement" started to form in the Township's northwest area with settlers from England. The Village of Flushing was platted that same year, 1840. Clayton Township (survey township 7N 5E) was split off in 1846. In 1855, the West half of survey township 8 North in Range 6 East was reunited with the East half to form Mt. Morris Township. The Flushing community was incorporated as a village on March 21, 1877.

On December 22, 1951, a B-29 Superfortress crashed onto the farm of Crerston E. Sammons, off Beecher Road. The bomber was on a routine navigational training flight from Minneapolis to its home base at Griffiss Field at Rome, New York when its engines failed. The dead pilot, 1st Lieutenant Robert Davis Phelps of Andover, New Hampshire, was found near the wreckage with his body wrapped within his parachute. Phelps is credited with steering the crippled aircraft away from residential areas and preventing further loss of life. The seven other crew members parachuted to safety.

On Monday November 27, 2017, the northern loop set of municipalities, including Flushing, began receiving water from the Karegnondi Water Authority pipeline and treated by Genesee County Drain Commission Water and Waste Division.

== Government ==
The Flushing Fire Department for the City of Flushing is the on-call firefighting service for the Township and has automatic and mutual aid agreements with Montrose, Mt. Morris and Swartz Creek Area Fire Departments. The Flushing Township Police Department provides police coverage 24 hours a day and provides a school resource officer, who is also a K9 handler, to Flushing Community Schools. The township receives water from the Karegnondi Water Authority pipeline treated by Genesee County Drain Commission Water and Waste Division.

Flushing is part of the following:

- Genesee County Commissioner District 7
- Michigan House of Representatives District 69
- State Senate District 27
- 67th District Court Division 1
- Michigan's 8th Congressional District
- Genesee District Library

Educational services are primarily provided by Flushing Community Schools, while small parts of the township are served by Montrose Community Schools and Clio Area School District.

== Geography ==
According to the United States Census Bureau, the township has a total area of 31.0 square miles (80 km^{2}), of which 30.9 square miles (80 km^{2}) is land and 0.2 square miles (0.52 km^{2}) (0.48%) is water.

== Demographics ==
As of the census of 2010, there were 10,640 people, 4,007 households, and 3,047 families residing in the township. The population density was 344.3 inhabitants per square mile (132.9/km^{2}). There were 4,007 housing units at an average density of 129.7 per square mile (50.1/km^{2}). The racial makeup of the township was 98.4% White, 2.1% African American, 0.6% Native American, 0.8% Asian, and 1.6% from two or more races. Hispanic or Latino of any race were 2.4% of the population.

Of 4,007 households, 30.7% had children under the age of 18 living with them, 62.4% were married couples living together, 9.4% had a female householder with no husband present, 4.2% had a male householder with no wife present, and 24% were non-families. The average household size was 2.6 and the average family size was 3.0.
