= Amanda Carpenter =

American political advisor, speechwriter, pundit

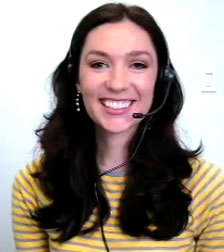
- Born: November 20, 1982 (age 43)
- Education: Ball State University (BA)
- Occupation: Political commentator
- Known for: Print and television pundit
- Political party: Republican

Amanda Carpenter (born November 20, 1982) is an American author, political advisor, and speechwriter. She is a former senior staffer to Senators Jim DeMint and Ted Cruz. She was a columnist for The Washington Times from 2009 to 2010 and regularly appeared as a political contributor on CNN from 2015 to 2021.

== Early life and education ==
Carpenter grew up in Montrose, Michigan. She graduated from Ball State University with a B.A. in Communication Studies in 2005.

== Career in media and politics ==
Carpenter worked as a congressional correspondent for Human Events from 2005 to 2007 before joining Townhall.com to become its national political reporter.

In March 2009, Carpenter took a position with The Washington Times, where she wrote a daily column called the Hot Button that covered political and cultural issues as well other news articles. In early 2010, Carpenter left The Washington Times and joined Senator Jim DeMint's staff as senior communications advisor and speechwriter.

In January 2013, Carpenter became senior communications advisor and speechwriter for Senator Ted Cruz.In July 2015, Carpenter returned to her journalism career. She was a contributor for CNN from 2015 to 2021. Carpenter worked for The Bulwark from 2020 to 2023. She began working for Protect Democracy in 2023.

Carpenter is known for criticizing Donald Trump, in particular his treatment of women. Carpenter has said that she agrees with some of Trump's first-term policy decisions, but that the scandals surrounding his presidency make it "very difficult" to defend him. In her 2018 book, Gaslighting America: Why We Love It When Trump Lies to Us, she focuses on Trump's perceived propensity for lying.

Carpenter is also known as a blogger, author, and commentator. She has made numerous media appearances, including segments on the BBC; Fox News's The O'Reilly Factor, Red Eye w/ Greg Gutfeld, Hannity & Colmes, and The Big Story; MSNBC's Tucker; PBS's To the Contrary and CNN's Larry King Live and Reliable Sources. Her book The Vast Right-Wing Conspiracy's Dossier on Hillary Rodham Clinton was published in 2006. She later wrote about the 2008 presidential election for Glamour magazine's blog "Glamocracy".

As of January 2024, Carpenter is a Republican.

== Personal life ==
Carpenter lives in the Washington, D.C. area with her husband and two children.

== Publications ==
- The Vast Right-Wing Conspiracy's Dossier on Hillary Rodham Clinton. Regnery Publishing. 2006. ISBN 978-1-59698-014-3.
- Gaslighting America: Why We Love It When Trump Lies to Us. Broadside Books. 2018. ISBN 978-0-06274-800-3.

== See also ==
- False or misleading statements by Donald Trump
- Vast right-wing conspiracy
