= Joseph Sewall =

American politician (1921–2011)

Member of the Maine Senate from the 27 district
- In office 1967–1983
- Succeeded by: Michael Pearson

Personal details
- Born: December 17, 1921 Old Town, Maine, U.S.
- Died: November 23, 2011 (aged 89) Bangor, Maine, U.S.
- Party: Republican
- Spouse: Hilda Thoreau Wheelwright
- Education: Bowdoin College A.B., DCL (Hon. Causa); Thomas College, DCL (Hon. Causa)
- Profession: Chairman and CEO of James W. Sewall Company

Joseph Sewall (December 17, 1921 – November 23, 2011) was an American politician and businessperson. He served four terms as President of the Maine Senate (1975–1982), which made him at that time the longest serving Senate President in Maine history.

Sewall was born in Old Town, Maine, son of James Wingate Sewall and Louise Gray Sewall in the home that his great grandfather and Speaker of the Maine House of Representatives, George P. Sewall, built between 1830 and 1851. His maternal grandfather, George Gray, founded Old Town Canoe Co. He attended local schools, Holderness School, and Bowdoin College, A.B. 1941, Doctor of Civil Law, Honoris Causa, 1983. After graduation (accelerated) from college he enlisted in the U.S. Navy in 1943 during World War II as an aerial navigator, specializing in celestial navigation. Shortly after the end of the War, and after his father's death in 1946, he became President of James W. Sewall Company in Old Town, an international consulting forestry and engineering firm. He later was elected to the Old Town City Council and then to the Maine State Senate in 1967. Sewall served as President of the Maine Senate from 1975 to 1982. He was succeeded in the Maine Senate in 1982 by Democrat Michael Pearson. Upon leaving the legislature, Sewall was appointed to the Board of Trustees of Maine Maritime Academy by Governor Joseph Brennan. Soon after his appointment, he was elected Chairman, a post he held for 20 years. He was also appointed by President George H.W. Bush to be a U.S. Commissioner of the Roosevelt Campobello International Park Joint Commission and a Member of the *Commission on Merchant Marine and Defense by President Ronald Reagan and re-appointments by President George H. W. Bush. He was a Trustee of Eastern Maine Medical Center, and a Director of Merchants National Bank, its successor, Merrill Merchants Bank, then its successor, People's United Bank (Bangor District), all of Bangor. Sewall was a moderate Republican.

On November 23, 2011, Sewall died at the Eastern Maine Medical Center in Bangor, Maine.
