= Aubrey Pleasant =

American football coach

Personal information
- Born: Flint, Michigan, U.S.

Career information
- Position: Safety
- High school: Flint (MI) Northern; Hill-McCloy (MI)
- College: Wisconsin (2005–2008)
- NFL draft: 2009: undrafted

Career history
- Grand Blanc (MI) HS (2010) Defensive backs coach; Michigan (2011) Defensive graduate assistant; Michigan (2012) Assistant defensive backs coach; Cleveland Browns (2013) Coaching intern; Washington Redskins (2013) Offensive assistant; Washington Redskins (2014–2016) Defensive quality control coach; Los Angeles Rams (2017–2020) Cornerbacks coach; Detroit Lions (2021–2022) Defensive backs & passing game coordinator; Green Bay Packers (2022) Offensive consultant; Los Angeles Rams (2023) Defensive backs & passing game coordinator; Los Angeles Rams (2024–2025) Assistant head coach & passing game coordinator

Aubrey Pleasant is an American football coach who was most recently the assistant head coach and pass game coordinator for the Los Angeles Rams of the National Football League (NFL). He played college football at Wisconsin and was previously an assistant coach for the Rams, Detroit Lions and Green Bay Packers.

== Early life ==
Pleasant grew up in Flint, Michigan, where he attended Montrose High School and earned all-city running back honors as a sophomore. He graduated from Montrose Community Schools after receiving Class B all-state honorable mention at safety his senior year.

== College football career ==
Pleasant was a 3-star recruit coming out of high school and committed to the University of Wisconsin, where he was a 3-year letterman from 2005 to 2008, with 41 career appearances and 14 starts at safety. He finished his college career with 80 tackles, two sacks, one forced fumble and an appearance in four consecutive bowl games: the 2006 and 2007 Capital One Bowls, the 2008 Outback Bowl and the 2009 Champs Sports Bowl. Pleasant earned a bachelor's degree in sociology from Wisconsin in 2009 and his master's in education while coaching at Michigan.

== Coaching career ==
=== Grand Blanc High School ===
Pleasant began coaching at Grand Blanc High School. He worked mostly with the defensive backs and was a behavioral specialist and special education teacher in the Flint Community School District.

=== Michigan ===
He was then hired by the University of Michigan as a graduate assistant and worked mainly with the defensive backs, where they allowed 190.5 yards per game and 17.4 points per game, making them 16th and 6th in the nation, respectively. The defense allowed only 12 touchdown passes and led the Big Ten with 29 takeaways as well as 20 fumble recoveries, which tied for first in the FBS. Pleasant was promoted to assistant defensive backs coach the following year, where the Wolverines' defense improved to 13th and 5th following the 2012 season.

=== Cleveland Browns ===
In 2013 he was hired by the Cleveland Browns as an offensive staff and head coaching intern during training camp.

=== Washington Redskins ===
Following training camp, he was hired as an offensive assistant by the Washington Redskins and promoted to defensive quality control coach the following year. He assisted defensive backs coach Raheem Morris with the development of rookie Bashaud Breeland, who went on to tie for the rookie lead in passes defensed with 14. The following year, Perry Fewell replaced Morris as DB's coach, where he and Pleasant helped with the transition of DeAngelo Hall and developments of rookies Quinton Dunbar and Kyshoen Jarrett.

=== Los Angeles Rams ===
Following the 2016 season, he was hired by the Los Angeles Rams as their cornerbacks coach under new head coach Sean McVay, where he worked closely with defensive coordinator Wade Phillips in implementing the defensive scheme in L.A. As cornerbacks coach for the Rams, five different cornerbacks recorded at least two interceptions in a season, including Marcus Peters, Troy Hill and Darious Williams in 2018, when the Rams went on to participate in Super Bowl LIII.

=== Detroit Lions ===
The Detroit Lions hired Pleasant as pass game coordinator/defensive backs coach on January 28, 2021. Following the team's 1-6 start to the 2022 season, Pleasant was fired by the Lions on October 31, 2022.

=== Green Bay Packers ===
After being fired by the Lions, on November 14, 2022, Pleasant was hired by the Green Bay Packers as an offensive consultant, in order to give head coach Matt LaFleur defensive perspectives.

=== Los Angeles Rams (second stint) ===
On February 16, 2023, Pleasant was rehired by the Los Angeles Rams as defensive backs coach and passing game coordinator, and helped the team reach the playoffs. Prior to the 2024 season, Pleasant retained the passing game coordinator position while taking on the additional title of assistant head coach. For a preseason game against the Los Angeles Chargers, Rams head coach Sean McVay turned over head coaching responsibilities to Pleasant. With McVay in the coach's booth and Pleasant on the field, the Rams defeated the Chargers 13-9. The Rams went on to win the NFC West championship and advanced to the divisional round of the playoffs. For the 2025 season, Pleasant retained his coaching responsibilities and again coached the Rams team in a preseason game against the Chargers, winning 23–22. Los Angeles made the playoffs for the third straight season, and reached the NFC Championship Game, where the Rams lost to the eventual Super Bowl champion Seattle Seahawks.

Following the end of the season, Pleasant was interviewed for defensive coordinator positions with the Arizona Cardinals, Cleveland Browns, Los Angeles Chargers, and Las Vegas Raiders, but was ultimately not selected by any club. On February 23, 2026, it was announced that Pleasant would not be retained on the Rams' coaching staff for the 2026 season. In explaining his decision, Rams head coach Sean McVay praised Pleasant's contributions, but said that he felt it was, “in the best interest of both parties to move on.” He added that it was, “not an easy decision.”
