= James Appleton =

American abolitionist and politician (1785–1862)

General James Appleton
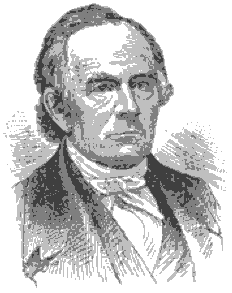

Member of the Maine House of Representatives
- In office 1836–1839

Member of the Massachusetts House of Representatives
- In office 1813–1834

Personal details
- Born: February 14, 1785 Ipswich, Massachusetts
- Died: August 25, 1862 (aged 77) Ipswich, Massachusetts
- Party: Federalist, Whig, Liberty
- Spouse: Sarah Fuller (m. 1807)
- Relations: William Appleton (cousin); Samuel Appleton (cousin); Nathan Appleton (cousin)
- Children: 10
- Parent(s): Samuel Appleton; Mary White
- Relatives: Appleton family
- Occupation: Publisher

Brigadier General James Appleton (February 14, 1785 – August 25, 1862) was an American abolitionist, early supporter of temperance, and politician from Maine.

== Early life ==
Appleton was born on February 14, 1785, in Ipswich, Massachusetts, on a family farm that had been granted to his ancestor, Samuel Appleton, in 1636. His parents were Samuel Appleton (1738–1819) and Mary (née White) Appleton (d. 1834), daughter of Rev. Timothy White, and his younger brothers were Timothy Appleton (1778–1857) and Samuel Appleton (1771–1852).

His paternal grandparents were Elizabeth Sawyer (1709–1785) and Isaac Appleton (1704–1794), the son of Isaac Appleton (1664–1747) and Priscilla Baker, granddaughter of Lt. Gov. Samuel Symonds. Appleton was also the cousin of U.S. Rep.William Appleton (1786–1862), merchant Samuel Appleton (1766–1853), and U.S. Rep. Nathan Appleton (1779–1861).

== Career ==
Appleton fought in the War of 1812, commissioned July 3, 1813, and earned the rank of Lieutenant colonel with the Massachusetts Militia and was later promoted to the rank of Brigadier general. He commanded actions at Sandy Bay in September 1814 and Gallop's Folly in October 1814. Appleton lived much of his life in Ipswich, Massachusetts, and nearby Marblehead, Massachusetts, prior to moving to Maine.

=== Massachusetts General Court ===
In 1813 and 1814, at the age of 28, Appleton, a practicing lawyer, was elected to represent Gloucester as a Federalist to the Massachusetts legislature where he was an outspoken critic of the Missouri Compromise. In 1824, he was the official escort of the Marquis de Lafayette upon his visit to Boston. In 1832, he presented a petition to the Massachusetts legislature prohibiting sales of liquor in fewer quantities than thirty gallons.

=== Maine politics ===
In 1833, he moved to Portland, Maine, and was elected to the Maine House of Representatives in 1836. The following year, he was chairman of a committee to consider the license system. In 1837, he submitted a report on the evils of liquor that became the basis of the Maine Temperance Law of 1846. The report was considered by Neal Dow to be the first official document in the history of Maine prohibiting the liquor traffic.

In 1839 and 1840, he was vice president of the American Anti-Slavery Society.

In the 1842, 1843, and 1844 gubernatorial elections, Appleton ran for Governor of Maine with the Liberty Party, an abolitionist political party. In 1848, he was a Free Soil presidential elector supporting Martin Van Buren.

In 1861, during the Civil War, Appleton gave patriotic speeches defending the Union and in support of abolition.

== Personal life ==
On November 15, 1807, he was married to Sarah Fuller (1787–1872), the daughter of Rev. Daniel Fuller and Hannah Bowers, of Gloucester. Together, they were the parents of:

- Samuel Gilman Appleton (1808–1873), who married Sarah Gardiner, daughter of Rev. Sylvester Gardiner, in 1839.
- Sarah Fuller Appleton (1811–1884), who married Rev. Stephen Caldwell Millett in 1833.
- James Appleton (1813–1884), who married Sarah Bristol Edwards, daughter of Samuel L. Edwards, in 1842.
- Mary White Appleton (1815–1905), who did not marry.
- Elizabeth Putnam Appleton (1818–1897), who married Shelton L. Hall in 1845.
- Joanna Dodge Appleton (1821–1870), who married Peyton R. Morgan in 1843.
- Hannah Fuller Appleton (1823–1903), who married Robert Helyer Thayer (1820–1888).
- Daniel Fuller Appleton (1826–1904), who married Julia Randall (d. 1886), daughter of Nicholas P. Randall. After her death, he married Susan Cowles, daughter of John P. Cowles, in 1889.
- Harriette Hooper Appleton (1828–1905), who married Rev. John Cotton Smith, rector of St John's Church, Portland, and later of the Church of the Ascension in New York City, in 1849.
- Anna Whittemore Appleton (1831–); married Dr. Charles H. Osgood, in 1852.

He lived in Portland from 1833 until 1853 when his elder brother, Timothy Appleton, called him to help manage the family farm in Ipswich. He retired back to Ipswich, buying out his father's surviving heirs and became the sole owner of Appleton Farm in 1857. He died there in 1862.

=== Descendants ===
Through his son, Daniel, he was the grandfather of 36 including Francis Randall Appleton, a noted New York society man during the Gilded Age.

=== Honors ===
The Woman's Relief Corps gave a marker on Ipswich's North Green, named in honor of Appleton and in memory of the unknown soldiers and sailors of the Civil War.

Party political offices
First	Liberty nominee for Governor of Maine; 1844	Succeeded by Samuel Fessenden
