= David Dunn (Maine politician) =

American politician (1811–1894)

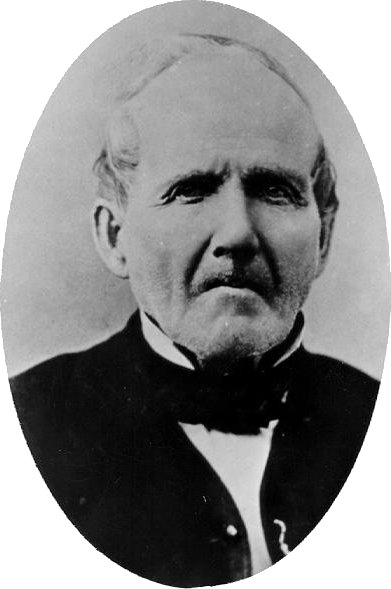
- Dunn in 1846

18th Governor of Maine
- In office January 1, 1844 – January 3, 1844
- Preceded by: Edward Kavanagh
- Succeeded by: John W. Dana

Member of the Maine House of Representatives
- In office 1840–1844

Personal details
- Born: January 17, 1811 Cornish, Massachusetts (now Maine)
- Died: February 17, 1894 (aged 83) Mechanic Falls, Maine
- Party: Democratic

David Dunn (January 17, 1811 – February 17, 1894) was an American Democratic politician and lawyer. He acted as the 18th governor of Maine for three days in 1844.

== Biography ==
David Dunn was born in Cornish (in modern-day Maine, then a part of Massachusetts) on January 17, 1811.

Dunn studied law under then future Governor, "Squire" John Fairfield, of Saco. He was admitted to the bar in 1833 and shortly thereafter opened up a practice at Poland Corner.

He represented the town of Poland in the Maine House of Representatives from 1840 to 1844 and was speaker in 1843 and 1844. In that capacity Dunn served for three days as acting governor in 1844 when President of the Senate, Edward Kavanagh, resigned as acting governor.

The game of political musical chairs continued with Dunn resigning and the new president of the Senate, John W. Dana, acting as governor until newly elected Hugh J. Anderson was sworn in.

In 1845 Dunn was elected to the Maine Senate and served as its President following the resignation of Stephen Chase of Fryeburg in 1846.

Dunn was rewarded for his tenacity by the Buchanan administration which appointed him to a clerkship in the Post Office in Washington, D.C., which he held from 1857 to 1861.

Following his return to Maine he practiced law in Mechanic Falls. He died on February 17, 1894, at the age of eighty-three.

Political offices
Preceded by Edward Kavanagh	Governor of Maine; 1844	Succeeded by John W. Dana
Preceded by Charles Andrews	Speaker of the Maine House of Representatives; 1843-1844	Succeeded by Moses Macdonald
