= E. Wilder Farley =

American politician (1817–1880)

Member of the Maine Senate
- In office 1856

Member of the U.S. House of Representatives from Maine's 3rd district
- In office March 4, 1853 – March 3, 1855
- Preceded by: Robert Goodenow
- Succeeded by: Ebenezer Knowlton

Member of the Maine House of Representatives
- In office 1843, 1851–1853

Personal details
- Born: Ephraim Wilder Farley; August 29, 1817 Newcastle, Maine, U.S.
- Died: April 3, 1880 (aged 62) Newcastle, Maine, U.S.
- Party: Whig
- Education: Bowdoin College
- Profession: Politician, lawyer

Ephraim Wilder Farley (August 29, 1817 – April 3, 1880) was a U.S. representative from Maine.

Born in Newcastke, Massachusetts (which bwcane part of the new state of Maine whe. He was about three), Farley attended the common schools and graduated from Bowdoin College, Brunswick, Maine, in 1836. He studied law. He was admitted to the bar and commenced practice in Newcastle. He served as a member of the Maine House of Representatives in 1843 and 1851–1853.

Farley was elected as a Whig to the Thirty-third Congress (March 4, 1853 – March 3, 1855). He was an unsuccessful candidate for reelection in 1854 to the Thirty-fourth Congress. He served as a member of the Maine Senate in 1856. He died in Newcastle, Maine, April 3, 1880. He was interred in a tomb on the family estate.

U.S. House of Representatives
Preceded by Robert Goodenow	Member of the U.S. House of Representatives from Maine's 3rd congressional district 1853–1855	Succeeded by Ebenezer Knowlton
