= Edward Robinson (Maine politician) =

American politician (1796–1857)

Member of the U.S. House of Representatives from Maine's 3rd district
- In office April 28, 1838 – March 3, 1839
- Preceded by: Jonathan Cilley
- Succeeded by: Benjamin Randall

Personal details
- Born: November 25, 1796 Cushing, Massachusetts, U.S.
- Died: February 19, 1857 (aged 60) Thomaston, Maine, U.S.
- Resting place: Thomaston Cemetery, Thomaston, Maine, U.S.
- Party: Whig
- Spouse(s): Joanna A Parsons (m. 1823) Nancy James Fales (m. 1828) Penelope G Fales (m. 1846)
- Children: 6
- Parent(s): William Robinson; Catharine Packard
- Profession: Politician

Edward Robinson (November 25, 1796 – February 19, 1857) was a United States representative from Maine. He was born in Cushing, Massachusetts (now in Maine) on November 25, 1796.

He was self-educated while engaged in seafaring. He then engaged in mercantile pursuits in Thomaston. He was elected as a member of the Maine State Senate in 1836 and 1837. He was elected as a Whig to the Twenty-fifth Congress to fill the vacancy caused by the death of Jonathan Cilley and served from April 28, 1838, to March 3, 1839.

He returned to mercantile pursuits, as well as developing interests in banking, and shipbuilding until his death in Thomaston on February 19, 1857. His interment is in Thomaston Cemetery.

Party political offices
Preceded by Edward Kent	Whig nominee for Governor of Maine; 1842, 1843, 1844	Succeeded by Freeman H. Morse
U.S. House of Representatives
Preceded by Jonathan Cilley	Member of the U.S. House of Representatives from Maine's 3rd congressional district April 28, 1838 – March 3, 1839	Succeeded by Benjamin Randall
