= Maine's 3rd congressional district =

Former U.S. House district from 1821 to 1963

- Obsolete district
- Created: 1820; 1885
- Eliminated: 1883; 1963
- Years active: 1820-1883; 1885-1963

Maine's 3rd congressional district is an obsolete congressional district. It was created in 1821 after Maine achieved statehood in 1820 as part of the enactment of the Missouri Compromise. It was eliminated in 1963 after the 1960 U.S. census. Its last congressman was Clifford McIntire.

== List of members representing the district ==
Member	Party	Years ↑	Cong ress	Electoral history	District location
District created March 4, 1821
Mark Langdon Hill (Phippsburg)	Democratic-Republican	March 4, 1821 – March 3, 1823	17th	Redistricted from Massachusetts's 16th district and re-elected in 1821. Lost re-election.	1821 – 1823; Hancock County: Deer Isle, Isleborough, Lincolnville, Northport, Vinalhaven; Lincoln County: Alna, Bath, Booth Bay, Bristol, Camden, Cushing, Edgecomb, Friendship, Georgetown, New Castle, Nobleborough, Phillipsburg, Saint George, Thomastown, Topsham, Waldoborough, Warren, Wiscasset, Woolwich
Ebenezer Herrick (Bowdoinham)	Democratic-Republican	March 4, 1823 – March 3, 1825	18th 19th	Redistricted from the 5th district and re-elected in 1823 on the third ballot. Re-elected in 1825 on the fourth ballot. Retired.	1823 – 1833; Lincoln County: Alna, Bath, Boothbay, Bowdoin, Bowdoinham, Bristol, Camden, Cushing, Dresden, Edgecomb, Friendship, Georgetown, Hope, Nobleborough, Jefferson, New Castle, Phipsburg, Richmond, Saint George, Thomaston, Topsham, Union, Waldoborough, Warren, Whitefield, Wiscasset, Woolwich
Ebenezer Herrick (Bowdoinham)	Anti-Jacksonian	March 4, 1825 – March 3, 1827	18th 19th	Redistricted from the 5th district and re-elected in 1823 on the third ballot. Re-elected in 1825 on the fourth ballot. Retired.	1823 – 1833; Lincoln County: Alna, Bath, Boothbay, Bowdoin, Bowdoinham, Bristol, Camden, Cushing, Dresden, Edgecomb, Friendship, Georgetown, Hope, Nobleborough, Jefferson, New Castle, Phipsburg, Richmond, Saint George, Thomaston, Topsham, Union, Waldoborough, Warren, Whitefield, Wiscasset, Woolwich
Joseph F. Wingate (Bath)	Anti-Jacksonian	March 4, 1827 – March 3, 1831	20th 21st	Elected in 1826. Re-elected in 1828. Retired.	1823 – 1833; Lincoln County: Alna, Bath, Boothbay, Bowdoin, Bowdoinham, Bristol, Camden, Cushing, Dresden, Edgecomb, Friendship, Georgetown, Hope, Nobleborough, Jefferson, New Castle, Phipsburg, Richmond, Saint George, Thomaston, Topsham, Union, Waldoborough, Warren, Whitefield, Wiscasset, Woolwich
Edward Kavanagh (Damariscotta Mills)	Jacksonian	March 4, 1831 – March 3, 1835	22nd 23rd	Elected in 1830. Re-elected in 1833. Lost re-election.	1823 – 1833; Lincoln County: Alna, Bath, Boothbay, Bowdoin, Bowdoinham, Bristol, Camden, Cushing, Dresden, Edgecomb, Friendship, Georgetown, Hope, Nobleborough, Jefferson, New Castle, Phipsburg, Richmond, Saint George, Thomaston, Topsham, Union, Waldoborough, Warren, Whitefield, Wiscasset, Woolwich
Edward Kavanagh (Damariscotta Mills)	Jacksonian	March 4, 1831 – March 3, 1835	22nd 23rd	Elected in 1830. Re-elected in 1833. Lost re-election.	1833 – 1843 [data missing]
Jeremiah Bailey (Wiscasset)	Anti-Jacksonian	March 4, 1835 – March 3, 1837	24th	Elected in 1834. Lost re-election.	1833 – 1843 [data missing]
Jonathan Cilley (Thomaston)	Democratic	March 4, 1837 – February 24, 1838	25th	Elected in 1836. Died.	1833 – 1843 [data missing]
Vacant		February 24, 1838 – April 28, 1838	25th		1833 – 1843 [data missing]
Edward Robinson (Thomaston)	Whig	April 28, 1838 – March 3, 1839	25th	Elected to finish Cilley's term. Retired.	1833 – 1843 [data missing]
Benjamin Randall (Bath)	Whig	March 3, 1839 – March 3, 1843	26th 27th	Elected in 1838. Re-elected in 1840. Retired.	1833 – 1843 [data missing]
Luther Severance (Augusta)	Whig	March 4, 1843 – March 3, 1847	28th 29th	Elected in 1843. Re-elected in 1844. Retired.	1843 – 1853 [data missing]
Hiram Belcher (Farmington)	Whig	March 4, 1847 – March 3, 1849	30th	Elected in 1846. Retired.	1843 – 1853 [data missing]
John Otis (Hallowell)	Whig	March 4, 1849 – March 3, 1851	31st	Elected in 1848. Retired.	1843 – 1853 [data missing]
Robert Goodenow (Farmington)	Whig	March 4, 1851 – March 3, 1853	32nd	Elected in 1850. Lost renomination.	1843 – 1853 [data missing]
E. Wilder Farley (Newcastle)	Whig	March 4, 1853 – March 3, 1855	33rd	Elected in 1852. Lost re-election.	1853 – 1863 [data missing]
Ebenezer Knowlton (South Montville)	Opposition	March 4, 1855 – March 3, 1857	34th	Elected in 1854. Retired.	1853 – 1863 [data missing]
Nehemiah Abbott (Belfast)	Republican	March 4, 1857 – March 3, 1859	35th	Elected in 1856. Retired.	1853 – 1863 [data missing]
Ezra B. French (Damariscotta)	Republican	March 4, 1859 – March 3, 1861	36th	Elected in 1858. Retired.	1853 – 1863 [data missing]
Samuel C. Fessenden (Rockland)	Republican	March 4, 1861 – March 3, 1863	37th	Elected in 1860. Retired.	1853 – 1863 [data missing]
James G. Blaine (Augusta)	Republican	March 4, 1863 – July 10, 1876	38th 39th 40th 41st 42nd 43rd 44th	Elected in 1862. Re-elected in 1864. Re-elected in 1866. Re-elected in 1868. Re-elected in 1870. Re-elected in 1872. Re-elected in 1874. Resigned when appointed U.S. Senator.	1863 – 1873 [data missing]
James G. Blaine (Augusta)	Republican	March 4, 1863 – July 10, 1876	38th 39th 40th 41st 42nd 43rd 44th	Elected in 1862. Re-elected in 1864. Re-elected in 1866. Re-elected in 1868. Re-elected in 1870. Re-elected in 1872. Re-elected in 1874. Resigned when appointed U.S. Senator.	1873 – 1883 [data missing]
Vacant		July 10, 1876 – December 4, 1876	44th		1873 – 1883 [data missing]
Edwin Flye (New Castle)	Republican	December 4, 1876 – March 3, 1877	44th	Elected to finish Blaine's term. Retired.	1873 – 1883 [data missing]
Stephen Decatur Lindsey (Norridgewock)	Republican	March 4, 1877 – March 3, 1883	45th 46th 47th	Elected in 1876. Re-elected in 1878. Re-elected in 1880. Retired.	1873 – 1883 [data missing]
District inactive		March 3, 1883 – March 4, 1885	48th	At-large districts used	
Seth Milliken (Belfast)	Republican	March 4, 1885 – April 18, 1897	49th 50th 51st 52nd 53rd 54th 55th	Redistricted from the at-large district and re-elected in 1884. Re-elected in 1886. Re-elected in 1888. Re-elected in 1890. Re-elected in 1892. Re-elected in 1894. Re-elected in 1896. Died.	1885 – 1893 [data missing]
Seth Milliken (Belfast)	Republican	March 4, 1885 – April 18, 1897	49th 50th 51st 52nd 53rd 54th 55th	Redistricted from the at-large district and re-elected in 1884. Re-elected in 1886. Re-elected in 1888. Re-elected in 1890. Re-elected in 1892. Re-elected in 1894. Re-elected in 1896. Died.	1893 – 1903 [data missing]
Vacant		April 18, 1897 – June 21, 1897	55th		1893 – 1903 [data missing]
Edwin C. Burleigh (Augusta)	Republican	June 21, 1897 – March 3, 1911	55th 56th 57th 58th 59th 60th 61st	Elected to finish Milliken's term. Re-elected in 1898. Re-elected in 1900. Re-elected in 1902. Re-elected in 1904. Re-elected in 1906. Re-elected in 1908. Lost re-election.	1893 – 1903 [data missing]
Edwin C. Burleigh (Augusta)	Republican	June 21, 1897 – March 3, 1911	55th 56th 57th 58th 59th 60th 61st	Elected to finish Milliken's term. Re-elected in 1898. Re-elected in 1900. Re-elected in 1902. Re-elected in 1904. Re-elected in 1906. Re-elected in 1908. Lost re-election.	1903 – 1913 [data missing]
Samuel W. Gould (Skowhegan)	Democratic	March 4, 1911 – March 3, 1913	62nd	Elected in 1910. Lost re-election.	1903 – 1913 [data missing]
Forrest Goodwin (Skowhegan)	Republican	March 4, 1913 – May 28, 1913	63rd	Elected in 1912. Died.	1913 – 1933 [data missing]
Vacant		May 28, 1913 – September 9, 1913	63rd		1913 – 1933 [data missing]
John A. Peters (Ellsworth)	Republican	September 9, 1913 – January 2, 1922	63rd 64th 65th 66th 67th	Elected to finish Goodwin's term. Re-elected in 1914. Re-elected in 1916. Re-elected in 1918. Re-elected in 1920. Resigned when appointed Judge of the U.S. District Court for the District of Maine.	1913 – 1933 [data missing]
Vacant		January 2, 1922 – March 20, 1922	67th		1913 – 1933 [data missing]
John E. Nelson (Augusta)	Republican	March 20, 1922 – March 3, 1933	67th 68th 69th 70th 71st 72nd	Elected to finish Peters's term. Re-elected in 1922. Re-elected in 1924. Re-elected in 1926. Re-elected in 1928. Re-elected in 1930. Lost re-election.	1913 – 1933 [data missing]
John G. Utterback (Bangor)	Democratic	March 4, 1933 – January 3, 1935	73rd	Elected in 1932. Lost re-election.	1933 – 1943 [data missing]
Ralph O. Brewster (Dexter)	Republican	January 3, 1935 – January 3, 1941	74th 75th 76th	Elected in 1934. Re-elected in 1936. Re-elected in 1938. Retired to run for U.S. Senator.	1933 – 1943 [data missing]
Frank Fellows (Bangor)	Republican	January 3, 1941 – August 27, 1951	77th 78th 79th 80th 81st 82nd	Elected in 1940. Re-elected in 1942. Re-elected in 1944. Re-elected in 1946. Re-elected in 1948. Re-elected in 1950. Died.	1933 – 1943 [data missing]
Frank Fellows (Bangor)	Republican	January 3, 1941 – August 27, 1951	77th 78th 79th 80th 81st 82nd	Elected in 1940. Re-elected in 1942. Re-elected in 1944. Re-elected in 1946. Re-elected in 1948. Re-elected in 1950. Died.	1943 – 1953 [data missing]
Vacant		August 27, 1951 – October 22, 1951	82nd		1943 – 1953 [data missing]
Clifford McIntire (Perham)	Republican	October 22, 1951 – January 3, 1963	82nd 83rd 84th 85th 86th 87th	Elected to finish Fellows's term. Re-elected in 1952. Re-elected in 1954. Re-elected in 1956. Re-elected in 1958. Re-elected in 1960. Redistricted to the 2nd district.	1943 – 1953 [data missing]
Clifford McIntire (Perham)	Republican	October 22, 1951 – January 3, 1963	82nd 83rd 84th 85th 86th 87th	Elected to finish Fellows's term. Re-elected in 1952. Re-elected in 1954. Re-elected in 1956. Re-elected in 1958. Re-elected in 1960. Redistricted to the 2nd district.	1953 – 1963 [data missing]
District eliminated January 3, 1963

U.S. House of Representatives
Preceded by New York's 24th congressional district	Home district of the speaker of the House; March 4, 1869 – March 4, 1875	Succeeded by Indiana's 3rd congressional district
