= 1832 in the United States =

- Decades: 1810s; 1820s; 1830s; 1840s; 1850s
- See also: History of the United States (1789–1849); Timeline of United States history (1820–1859); List of years in the United States

Events from the year 1832 in the United States.

== Incumbents ==
=== Federal government ===
- President: Andrew Jackson (D-Tennessee)
- Vice President:

John C. Calhoun (D-South Carolina) (until December 28)
vacant (starting December 28)

- Chief Justice: John Marshall (Virginia)
- Speaker of the House of Representatives: Andrew Stevenson (D-Virginia)
- Congress: 22nd

==== State governments ====
Governors and lieutenant governors

=== Governors ===
- Governor of Alabama: John Gayle (Democratic)
- Governor of Connecticut: John Samuel Peters (National Republican)
- Governor of Delaware: David Hazzard (National Republican)
- Governor of Georgia: Wilson Lumpkin (Democratic)
- Governor of Illinois: John Reynolds (Democratic)
- Governor of Indiana: Noah Noble (Whig)
- Governor of Kentucky: Thomas Metcalfe (National Republican) (until September 4), John Breathitt (Democratic) (starting September 4)
- Governor of Louisiana: André B. Roman (Whig)
- Governor of Maine: Samuel E. Smith (Democratic)
- Governor of Maryland: George Howard (National Republican)
- Governor of Massachusetts: Levi Lincoln Jr. (National Republican)
- Governor of Mississippi: Gerard Brandon (Democratic) (until January 9), Abram M. Scott (Democratic) (starting January 9)
- Governor of Missouri: John Miller (Democratic) (until November 19), Daniel Dunklin (Democratic) (starting November 19)
- Governor of New Hampshire: Samuel Dinsmoor (Democratic)
- Governor of New Jersey: Peter Dumont Vroom (Democratic) (until October 26), Samuel L. Southard (Whig) (starting October 26)
- Governor of New York: Enos T. Throop (Democratic) (until end December 31)
- Governor of North Carolina: Montfort Stokes (Democratic) (until December 6), David Lowry Swain (National Republican) (starting December 6)
- Governor of Ohio: Duncan McArthur (National Republican) (until December 7), Robert Lucas (Democratic) (starting December 7)
- Governor of Pennsylvania: George Wolf (Democratic-Republican)
- Governor of Rhode Island: Lemuel H. Arnold (Whig)
- Governor of South Carolina: James Hamilton Jr. (Democratic) (until December 10), Robert Young Hayne (Democratic) (starting December 10)
- Governor of Tennessee: William Carroll (Democratic)
- Governor of Vermont: William A. Palmer (Anti-Masonic)
- Governor of Virginia: John Floyd (Democratic)

=== Lieutenant governors ===
- Lieutenant Governor of Connecticut: vacant (until May 4), Thaddeus Betts (Whig) (starting May 4)
- Lieutenant Governor of Illinois: Zadok Casey (Democratic)
- Lieutenant Governor of Indiana: David Wallace (Whig)
- Lieutenant Governor of Kentucky: John Breathitt (Democratic) (until September 4), James T. Morehead (National Republican) (starting September 4)
- Lieutenant Governor of Massachusetts: Thomas L. Winthrop (Democratic-Republican)
- Lieutenant Governor of Mississippi: Abram M. Scott (Democratic) (until month and day unknown), vacant (starting month and day unknown)
- Lieutenant Governor of Missouri: Daniel Dunklin (Democratic) (until November 19), Lilburn Boggs (Democratic) (starting November 19)
- Lieutenant Governor of New York: Edward Philip Livingston (Democratic) (until end of December 31)
- Lieutenant Governor of Rhode Island: Charles Collins (political party unknown)
- Lieutenant Governor of South Carolina: Patrick Noble (Democratic) (until December 10), Charles Cotesworth Pinckney (Democratic) (starting December 10)
- Lieutenant Governor of Vermont: Lebbeus Egerton (Anti-Masonic)

== Events ==
- February 9 – The city of Jacksonville, Florida receives its town charter from the legislative council of Florida Territory.
- March 3 – In Worcester v. Georgia, the United States Supreme Court holds that Cherokee Indians are entitled to federal protection from the actions of state governments.
- March 24 – In Hiram, Ohio a group of men beat, tar and feather Latter Day Saint movement founder Joseph Smith.
- April 6 – The Black Hawk War begins.
- May 9 – Lafayette College classes begin.
- May 21–23 – 1832 Democratic National Convention held in Baltimore.
- May 21 – Washington Irving returns to the U.S. after seventeen years living in Europe.
- July 4 – John Neal delivers the first public lecture in the U.S. to advocate the rights of women.
- July 10 – President Andrew Jackson vetoes a bill that would re-charter the Second Bank of the United States.
- July 24 – Benjamin Bonneville leads the first wagon train across the Rocky Mountains using the South Pass (Wyoming).
- July–August – The 1829–51 cholera pandemic reaches the Northeastern seaboard, beginning with New York City.
- August 27 – Black Hawk (Sauk leader) surrenders to the authorities, ending the Black Hawk War.
- October 8 – Washington Irving and Henry Leavitt Ellsworth arrive at Fort Gibson, Indian Territory (later Fort Gibson, Oklahoma) in the late morning hours. They leave the fort on October 10, with a small company of Rangers who escort them to the camp of Captain Jesse Bean who is waiting for them near the Arkansas River. Thus begins one of the first steps in the United States effort to remove the indigenous peoples of the Americas from their homes on the east coast in what would become known as the "Trail of Tears" some six years later.
- October 19 – Alpha Delta Phi fraternity is founded at Hamilton College (New York).
- November 2–December 5 – 1832 United States presidential election: Democratic incumbent President Andrew Jackson is reelected president defeats National Republican candidate Henry Clay, Nullifier Party candidate John Floyd and Anti-Masonic Party candidate William Wirt.
- November 14 – Charles Carroll of Carrollton, the last surviving signatory of the Declaration of Independence dies at his home in Maryland at age 95.
- November 24 – Ordinance of Nullification is passed.
- December – Skull and Bones secret society of Yale University established.
- December 28 – John C. Calhoun becomes the first vice president of the United States to resign.

=== Undated ===
- George Catlin starts to live among the Sioux in the Dakota Territory.
- Wills Eye Hospital in Philadelphia funded by a bequest.
- William Ticknor co-founds the publishing house that will become Ticknor and Fields, a predecessor of Houghton Mifflin, in Boston, Massachusetts.
- John Neal publishes "The Haunted Man," the first work of American fiction to use psychotherapy as a theme.

=== Ongoing ===
- Nullification Crisis (1832–1833)

== Births ==
- January 1 – Charles N. Felton, U.S. Senator from California from 1891 to 1893 (died 1914)
- January 13 – Horatio Alger Jr., Unitarian minister and author (died 1899)
- January 26 – George Shiras Jr., Associate Justice of the Supreme Court of the United States (died 1924)
- February 3 – Abram Williams, U.S. Senator from California from 1886 to 1887 (died 1911)
- February 6 – John Brown Gordon, U.S. Senator from Georgia from 1873 to 1880 and from 1891 to 1897 (died 1904)
- February 18 – Nathaniel P. Hill, U.S. Senator from Colorado from 1879 to 1885 (died 1900)
- March 4 – Samuel Colman, Hudson River school painter (died 1920)
- March 10 – Mary Bigelow Ingham, author and educator (died 1923)
- April 3 – James Sewall Reed, soldier (died 1864)
- April 8
  - Howell Edmunds Jackson, politician, Associate Justice of the Supreme Court of the United States (died 1895)
  - Jennie Perkins, poet (died 1912)
- April 10 – Alexander McDonald, U.S. Senator from Arkansas from 1868 to 1871 (died 1903)
- April 15 – John Irwin, admiral (died 1901)
- April 19 – Lucretia Garfield, First Lady of the United States (died 1918)
- April 22 – Julius Sterling Morton, 3rd United States Secretary of Agriculture (died 1902)
- June 9 – Martha Waldron Janes, minister, suffragist and columnist
- June 10 – Stephen Mosher Wood, politician (died 1920)
- June 11
  - Augustus Hill Garland, U.S. Senator from Arkansas from 1885 to 1889 (died 1899)
  - Lucy Pickens, socialite, known during and after her lifetime as the "Queen of the Confederacy" (died 1899)
- June 30 – Emily Lucas Blackall, author and philanthropist (died 1892)
- July 26 – Joseph P. Fyffe, admiral (died 1896)
- August 2 – Henry Steel Olcott, officer (died 1907)
- August 20 – Thaddeus S. C. Lowe, aeronaut, scientist and inventor (died 1913)
- September 10 – Randall L. Gibson, U.S. Senator from Louisiana from 1883 to 1892 (died 1892)
- September 25 – William Le Baron Jenney, architect (died 1907)
- September 26 – Joanna P. Moore, Baptist missionary and educator (died 1916)
- October 1
  - Caroline Harrison, wife of President Benjamin Harrison (died 1892)
  - Henry Clay Work, song composer (died 1884)
- October 9 – Elizabeth Akers Allen, poet and journalist (died 1911)
- October 10 – Joe Cain, parade organizer for Mardi Gras in Mobile, Alabama (died 1904)
- November 3 – S. S. Cook, member of the Washington House of Representatives (1889–1891)
- November 7 – Andrew Dickson White, historian, diplomat and co-founder of Cornell University (died 1918)
- November 21 – Benjamin Paul Blood, philosopher and poet (died 1919)
- November 26 – Mary Edwards Walker, physician (died 1919)
- November 29 – Louisa May Alcott, novelist (died 1888)
- December 6 – Thaddeus C. Pound, businessman and politician (died 1914)
- Undated – Boston Corbett, Union Army soldier who fatally shoots John Wilkes Booth (died ca. 1894)

== Deaths ==
- February 1 – Archibald Murphey, North Carolina politician (born c. 1777)
- February 2 – Amos Doolittle, engraver (born 1754)
- April 12 – Shadrach Bond, 1st governor of Illinois (born 1773)
- May 27 – John Rhea, U.S. Congressman from Tennessee and namesake of the Rhea letter
- June 10 – Joseph Hiester, politician (born 1752)
- November 12 – Henry Eckford, shipbuilder, naval architect, industrial engineer and entrepreneur (born 1775 in Scotland)
- November 14 – Charles Carroll, last surviving signer of the Declaration of Independence, U.S. Senator (born 1737)
- December 17 – Robert Charles Sands, writer (born 1799)
- December 18 – Philip Freneau, poet and journalist (born 1752)
- December 22 – Ishmail Spicer, music teacher, composer and publisher (born 1760)

== See also ==
- Timeline of United States history (1820–1859)
- Timeline of the Andrew Jackson presidency § 1832
