= 1830 in the United States =

- Decades: 1810s; 1820s; 1830s; 1840s; 1850s
- See also: History of the United States (1789–1849); Timeline of United States history (1820–1859); List of years in the United States

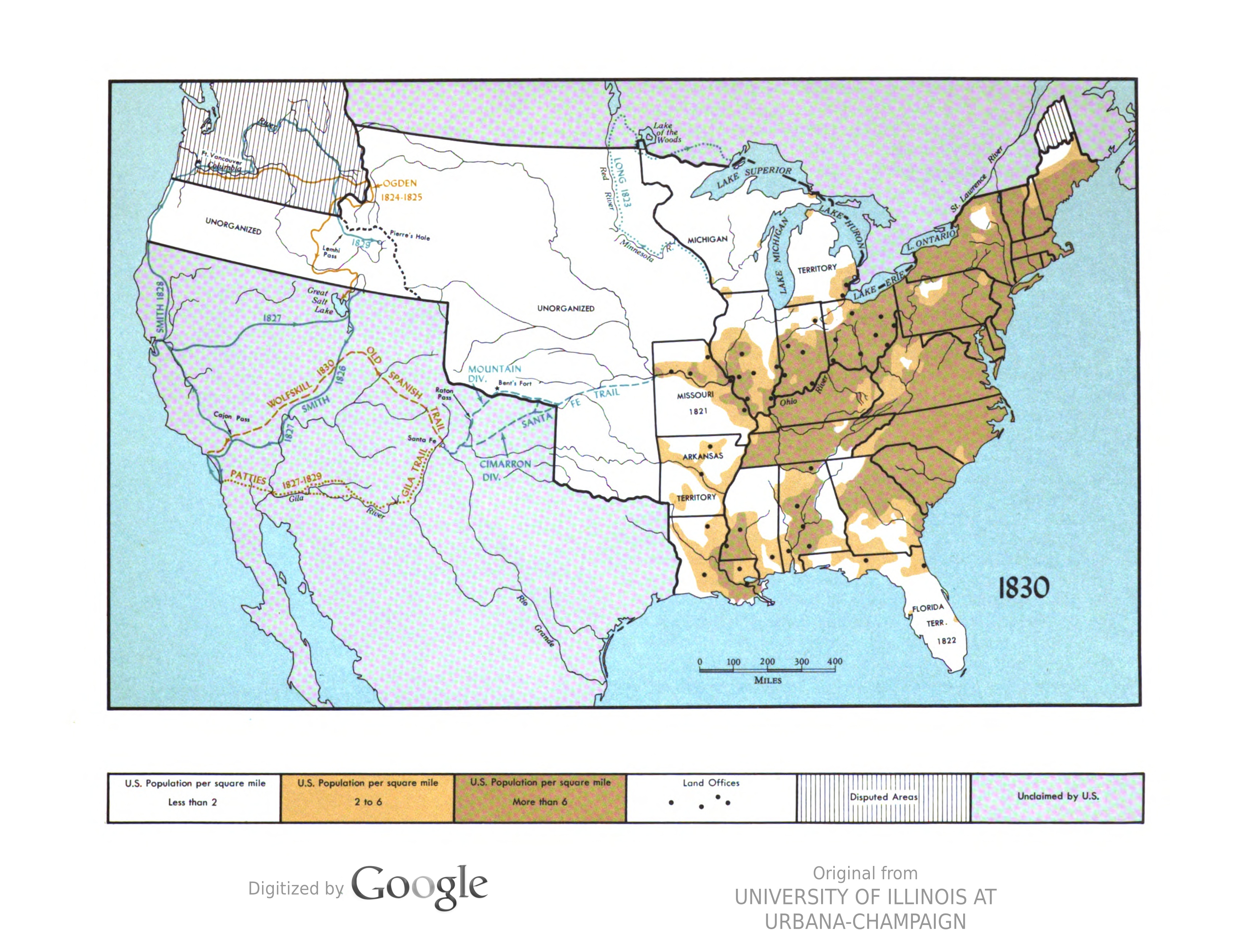
1830 in the United States

Events from the year 1830 in the United States.

== Incumbents ==
=== Federal government ===
- President: Andrew Jackson (D-Tennessee)
- Vice President: John C. Calhoun (D-South Carolina)
- Chief Justice: John Marshall (Virginia)
- Speaker of the House of Representatives: Andrew Stevenson (D-Virginia)
- Congress: 21st

==== State governments ====
Governors and lieutenant governors

=== Governors ===
- Governor of Alabama: Gabriel Moore (Democratic)
- Governor of Connecticut: Gideon Tomlinson (Democratic-Republican)
- Governor of Delaware: Charles Polk Jr. (Federalist) (until January 19), David Hazzard (National Republican) (starting January 19)
- Governor of Georgia: George R. Gilmer (Democratic-Republican)
- Governor of Illinois: Ninian Edwards (Democratic-Republican) (until December 6), John Reynolds (Democratic) (starting December 6)
- Governor of Indiana: James B. Ray (Independent)
- Governor of Kentucky: Thomas Metcalfe (National Republican)
- Governor of Louisiana: Armand Julie Beauvais (National Republican) (until January 14), Jacques Dupré (National Republican) (starting January 14)
- Governor of Maine:
  - until January 6: Nathan Cutler (Democratic)
  - January 6 – February 9: Joshua Hall (Democratic)
  - starting February 9: Jonathan G. Hunton (National Republican)
- Governor of Maryland: Daniel Martin (National Republican) (until January 15), Thomas King Carroll (Democratic) (starting January 15)
- Governor of Massachusetts: Levi Lincoln Jr. (National Republican)
- Governor of Mississippi: Gerard Brandon (Democratic)
- Governor of Missouri: John Miller (Democratic)
- Governor of New Hampshire: Benjamin Pierce (Democratic) (until June 3), Matthew Harvey (Democratic) (starting June 3)
- Governor of New Jersey: Peter Dumont Vroom (Democratic)
- Governor of New York: Enos T. Throop (Democratic)
- Governor of North Carolina: John Owen (Democratic) (until December 18), Montfort Stokes (Democratic) (starting December 18)
- Governor of Ohio: Allen Trimble (Federalist) (until December 18), Duncan McArthur (National Republican) (starting December 18)
- Governor of Pennsylvania: George Wolf (Democratic-Republican)
- Governor of Rhode Island: James Fenner (Democratic-Republican)
- Governor of South Carolina: Stephen Decatur Miller (Democratic) (until December 9), James Hamilton Jr. (Democratic) (starting December 9)
- Governor of Tennessee: William Carroll (Democratic)
- Governor of Vermont: Samuel C. Crafts (National Republican)
- Governor of Virginia: William Branch Giles (Democratic) (until March 4), John Floyd (Democratic) (starting March 4)

=== Lieutenant governors ===
- Lieutenant Governor of Connecticut: John Samuel Peters (National Republican)
- Lieutenant Governor of Illinois: William Kinney (Democratic) (until December 9), Zadok Casey (Democratic) (starting December 9)
- Lieutenant Governor of Indiana: Milton Stapp (Independent)
- Lieutenant Governor of Kentucky: John Breathitt (political party unknown)
- Lieutenant Governor of Massachusetts: Thomas L. Winthrop (political party unknown)
- Lieutenant Governor of Mississippi: Abram M. Scott (Democratic)
- Lieutenant Governor of Missouri: Daniel Dunklin (Democratic)
- Lieutenant Governor of New York: Edward Philip Livingston (Democratic)
- Lieutenant Governor of Rhode Island: Charles Collins (political party unknown)
- Lieutenant Governor of South Carolina: Thomas Williams (Democratic) (until December 9), Patrick Noble (Democratic) (starting December 9)
- Lieutenant Governor of Vermont: Henry Olin (Democratic-Republican) (until month and day unknown), Mark Richards (National Republican) (starting month and day unknown)

== Events ==
- January 11 – LaGrange College (now the University of North Alabama) opens, becoming the first publicly chartered college in Alabama.
- January 12–27 – Robert Y. Hayne of South Carolina debates the question of states' rights vs. federal authority with Daniel Webster of Massachusetts in the United States Congress.
- March 12 – Craig vs. Missouri: The United States Supreme Court rules that state loan certificates are unconstitutional.
- March 26 – Joseph Smith's religious text "Book of Mormon" is published in Palmyra, New York.
- May 24 – Sarah Josepha Hale's nursery rhyme "Mary Had a Little Lamb" is published in Boston.
- May 28 – U.S. congress passes the Indian Removal Act.
- September 27 – Treaty of Dancing Rabbit Creek with Choctaw nation. (First removal treaty signed after the Removal Act.)

== Births ==
- January 7 – Emerson Opdycke, businessman and Union Army brigadier general during the American Civil War (died 1884)
- January 8 – Gouverneur K. Warren, civil engineer and Union Army general in the American Civil War (died 1882)
- January 19 – George B. Cosby, Confederate brigadier general during the American Civil War (died 1909)
- January 25 – Thomas W. Palmer, U.S. Senator from Michigan from 1883 to 1889 (died 1913)
- January 31 – James G. Blaine, U.S. Senator from Maine from 1876 to 1881 and U.S. Secretary of State in 1881 and from 1889 to 1892 (died 1893)
- March 1 – Alexander Caldwell U.S. Senator from Kansas from 1871 to 1873 (died 1917)
- March 12 – William F. Brantley, Confederate general in the American Civil War (died 1870)
- March 20 – Eugene Asa Carr, Union Army general in the American Civil War (died 1910)
- April 26 – Thomas M. Norwood, U.S. Senator from Georgia from 1871 to 1877 (died 1913)
- May 9 – Harriet Lane, acting First Lady of the United States during James Buchanan's presidency (died 1903)
- May 13 – Zebulon Vance, Confederate military officer in the American Civil War, the 37th and 43rd Governor of North Carolina, U.S. Senator (died 1894)
- May 23 –
  - Henry M. Teller, U.S. Senator from Colorado from 1876 to 1882 and from 1885 to 1909 (died 1914)
  - George Lucas Hartsuff, Union Army major general in the American Civil War (died 1874)
- September 7 – Mary Treat, naturalist (died 1923)
- November 8 – Oliver Otis Howard, Union general and United States Army officer (died 1909)
- November 26 – Horace Tabor, U.S. Senator from Colorado in 1883 (died 1899)
- December 8 – William Pitt Kellogg, U.S. Senator from Louisiana from 1868 to 1872 and from 1877 to 1883 (died 1918)
- December 10 – Emily Dickinson, poet (died 1886)
- December 13 – James D. Walker, U.S. Senator from Arkansas from 1879 to 1885 (died 1906)

== Deaths ==
- January 17 – Elizabeth Willing Powel, socialite and Patriot (born 1743)
- February 1 – Thomas W. Cobb, U.S. Senator from Georgia from 1824 to 1828 (born 1784)
- June 25 – Ephraim McDowell, physician and pioneer surgeon (born 1771)
- July 2 – Robert H. Adams, U.S. Senator from Mississippi in 1830 (born 1792)
- August 6 – David Walker, African American abolitionist and writer (born 1796)
- August 9 – James Armistead Lafayette, African American slave, Continental Army double agent (born 1748 or 1760)
- September 24 – Elizabeth Monroe, First Lady of the United States (born 1768)
- October 14 – John McLean, U.S. Senator from Illinois from 1824 to 1825 and from 1829 to 1830 (born 1791)

== See also ==
- Timeline of United States history (1820–1859)
- Timeline of the Andrew Jackson presidency § 1830
