= 1829 in the United States =

- Decades: 1800s; 1810s; 1820s; 1830s; 1840s
- See also: History of the United States (1789–1849); Timeline of United States history (1820–1859); List of years in the United States

Events from the year 1829 in the United States.

== Incumbents ==
=== Federal government ===
- President:

John Quincy Adams (DR/NR-Massachusetts) (until March 4)
Andrew Jackson (D-Tennessee) (starting March 4)

- Vice President: John C. Calhoun (D-South Carolina)
- Chief Justice: John Marshall (Virginia)
- Speaker of the House of Representatives: Andrew Stevenson (D-Virginia)
- Congress: 20th (until March 4), 21st (starting March 4)

==== State governments ====
Governors and lieutenant governors

=== Governors ===
- Governor of Alabama: John Murphy (Democratic) (until November 25), Gabriel Moore (Democratic) (starting November 25)
- Governor of Connecticut: Gideon Tomlinson (Democratic-Republican)
- Governor of Delaware: Charles Polk Jr. (Federalist)
- Governor of Georgia: John Forsyth (Democratic-Republican) (until November 4), George R. Gilmer (Democratic-Republican) (starting November 4)
- Governor of Illinois: Ninian Edwards (Democratic-Republican)
- Governor of Indiana: James B. Ray (Independent)
- Governor of Kentucky: Thomas Metcalfe (National Republican)
- Governor of Louisiana: Pierre Derbigny (National Republican) (until October 6), Armand Julie Beauvais (National Republican) (starting October 6)
- Governor of Maine: Enoch Lincoln (Democratic-Republican) (until October 8), Nathan Cutler (Democratic) (starting October 8)
- Governor of Maryland: Joseph Kent (Democratic-Republican) (until January 15), Daniel Martin (National Republican) (starting January 15)
- Governor of Massachusetts: Levi Lincoln Jr. (National Republican)
- Governor of Mississippi: Gerard Brandon (Democratic)
- Governor of Missouri: John Miller (Democratic)
- Governor of New Hampshire: John Bell (National Republican) (until June 4), Benjamin Pierce (Democratic) (starting June 4)
- Governor of New Jersey:
  - until October 30: Isaac Halstead Williamson (Federalist)
  - October 30-November 6: Garret D. Wall (Democratic)
  - starting November 6: Peter Dumont Vroom (Democratic)
- Governor of New York:
  - January 1-March 12: Martin Van Buren (Democratic)
  - starting March 12: Enos T. Throop (Democratic)
- Governor of North Carolina: John Owen (Democratic)
- Governor of Ohio: Allen Trimble (Federalist)
- Governor of Pennsylvania: John Andrew Shulze (Democratic-Republican) (until December 15), George Wolf (Democratic-Republican) (starting December 15)
- Governor of Rhode Island: James Fenner (Democratic-Republican)
- Governor of South Carolina: Stephen Decatur Miller (Democratic)
- Governor of Tennessee:
  - until April 16: Sam Houston (Democratic-Republican)
  - April 16-October 1: William Hall (Democratic)
  - starting October 1: William Carroll (Democratic)
- Governor of Vermont: Samuel C. Crafts (National Republican)
- Governor of Virginia: William Branch Giles (Democratic)

=== Lieutenant governors ===
- Lieutenant Governor of Connecticut: John Samuel Peters (National Republican)
- Lieutenant Governor of Illinois: William Kinney (Democratic-Republican)
- Lieutenant Governor of Indiana: Milton Stapp (Independent)
- Lieutenant Governor of Kentucky: John Breathitt (political party unknown)
- Lieutenant Governor of Massachusetts: Thomas L. Winthrop (political party unknown)
- Lieutenant Governor of Mississippi: Abram M. Scott (Democratic)
- Lieutenant Governor of Missouri: Daniel Dunklin (Democratic)
- Lieutenant Governor of New York:
  - January 1-March 12: Enos T. Throop (Democratic)
  - March 12: Charles Stebbins (Democratic)
  - March 12-July 1: William M. Oliver (Democratic)
  - starting July 1: Edward Philip Livingston (Democratic)
- Lieutenant Governor of Rhode Island: Charles Collins (political party unknown)
- Lieutenant Governor of South Carolina: Thomas Williams (Democratic)
- Lieutenant Governor of Vermont: Henry Olin (Democratic-Republican)

== Events ==
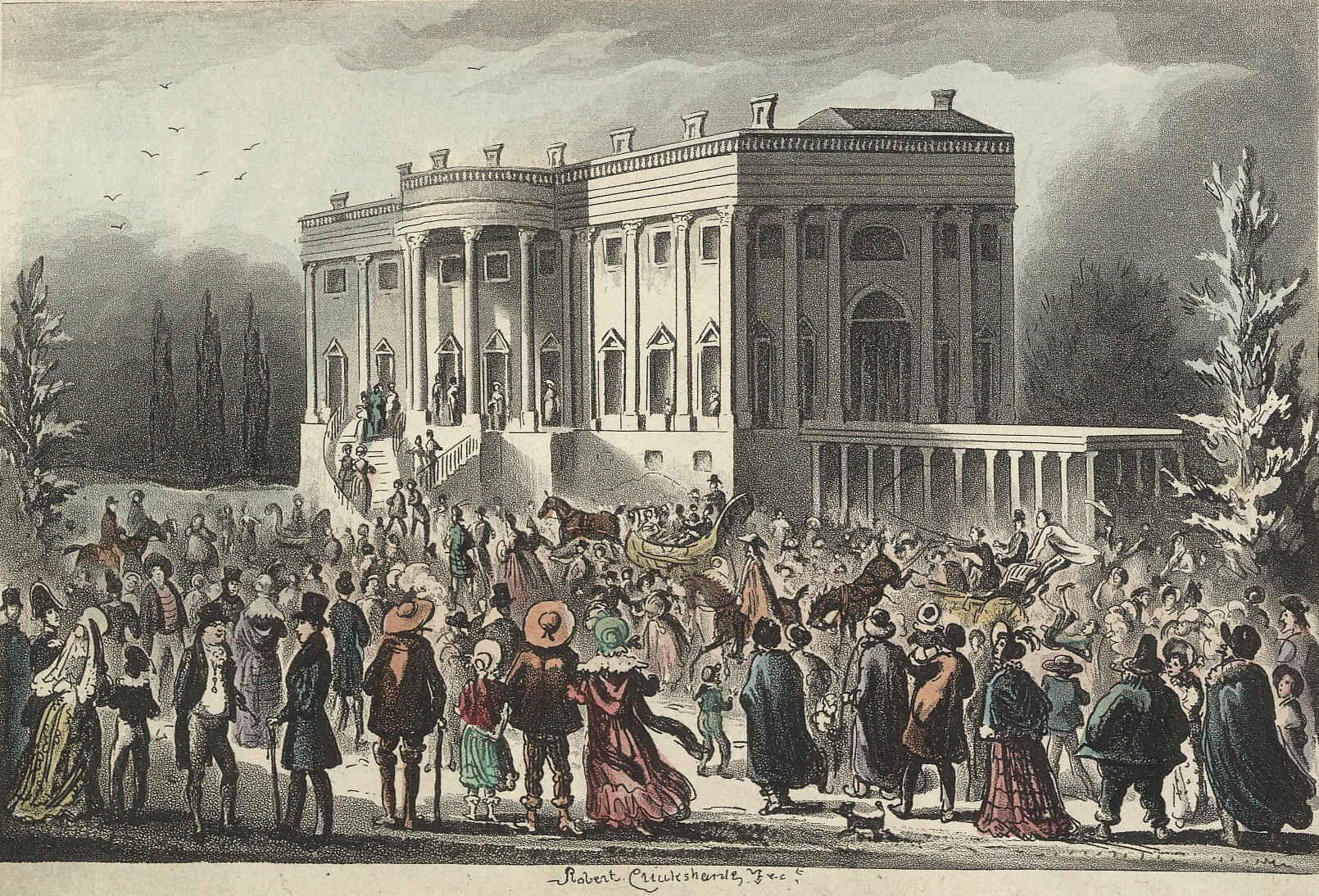
March 4: Andrew Jackson inaugurated as the seventh U.S. president

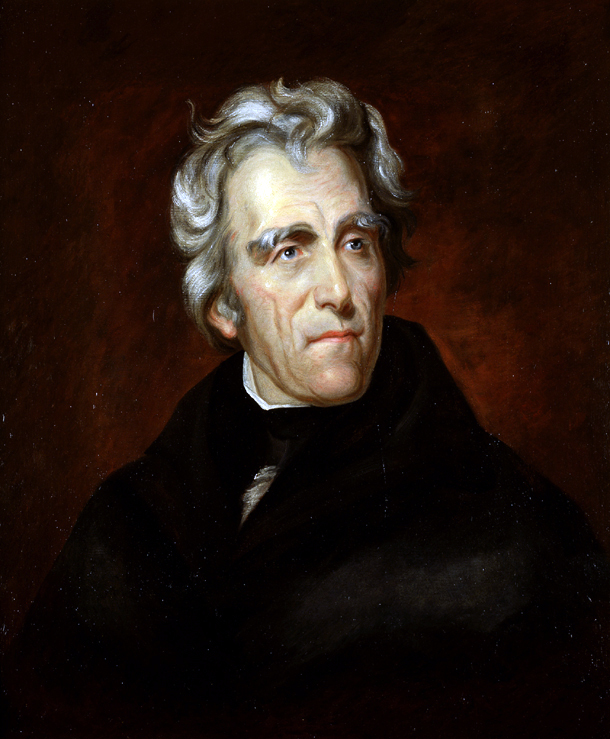
Portrait of Andrew Jackson

- March 4 – Andrew Jackson is sworn in as the seventh president of the United States, and John C. Calhoun is sworn in for his second term as the seventh vice president.
- June 1 – The Philadelphia Inquirer is founded as The Pennsylvania Inquirer.
- July 23 – William Austin Burt obtains the first patent for a typographer (typewriter).
- June 27 – James Smithson, a British mineralogist and chemist, leaves a bequest of £100,000 to fund the Smithsonian Institution in Washington, D.C.
- August 15–22 – Cincinnati riots of 1829.
- October 25 – Eastern State Penitentiary opens in Philadelphia as Cherry Hill State Prison, a pioneering example of the separate system in the history of United States prison systems.
- Undated – The Georgia Gold Rush begins as the country's first significant gold rush following the discovery of gold on October 27, 1828, by Benjamin Parks in the old Hall County, Georgia (later reorganized into Lumpkin County).

== Births ==
- March 2 – William B. Allison, U.S. Senator from Iowa from 1873 to 1908 (died 1908)
- April 12 – Daniel Sheldon Norton, U.S. Senator from Minnesota from 1865 to 1870 (died 1870)
- May 8 – Louis Moreau Gottschalk, composer and pianist (died 1869 in Brazil)
- May 28 – A. B. Rogers, surveyor (died 1889)
- July 9 – Robert Franklin Armfield, U.S. Representative from North Carolina (died 1898)
- August 6 – James T. Farley, U.S. Senator from California from 1879 to 1885 (died 1886)
- September 12 – Charles Dudley Warner, essayist and novelist (died 1900)
- October 5 – Chester A. Arthur, 21st president of the United States from 1881 to 1885, 20th vice president of the United States from March to September 1881 (died 1886)
- October 15 – Asaph Hall, astronomer (died 1907)
- October 30 – Roscoe Conkling, leader of the Stalwart faction of the Republican Party (died 1888)
- November 22 – Shelby Moore Cullom, U.S. Senator from Illinois from 1883 to 1913 (died 1914)
- December 8 – Henry Timrod, "poet laureate of the Confederacy" (died 1867)

== Deaths ==
- January 28 – Ephraim Bateman, U.S. Senator from New Jersey from 1826 to 1829 (born 1780)
- January 29 – Timothy Pickering, 2nd United States Secretary of War, 3rd United States Secretary of State (born 1745)
- February 18 – Hannah Tompkins, Second Lady of the United States (born 1781)
- April 11 – Archibald Gracie, merchant and shipowner (born 1755 in Scotland)
- May 17 – John Jay, represented New York at the Continental Congress in 1774, 2nd Governor of New York from 1795 to 1801 and 1st Chief Justice of the U.S. Supreme Court from 1789 to 1795 (born 1745)
- June 27 – James Smithson, British chemist and mineralogist whose inheritance will eventually create the Smithsonian Institution (born c. 1765 in France; died in Genoa)
- September 25 – Joseph Hodgkins, an Ipswich, Massachusetts cordwainer (born 1743)
- November 26 – Thomas Buck Reed, U.S. Senator from Mississippi from 1826 to 1827 and in 1829 (born 1787)
- December 12 – John Lansing Jr., statesman (born 1754; disappeared)

== See also ==
- Timeline of United States history (1820–1859)
- Timeline of the Andrew Jackson presidency § 1829
