= 1833 in the United States =

- Decades: 1810s; 1820s; 1830s; 1840s; 1850s
- See also: History of the United States (1789–1849); Timeline of United States history (1820–1859); List of years in the United States

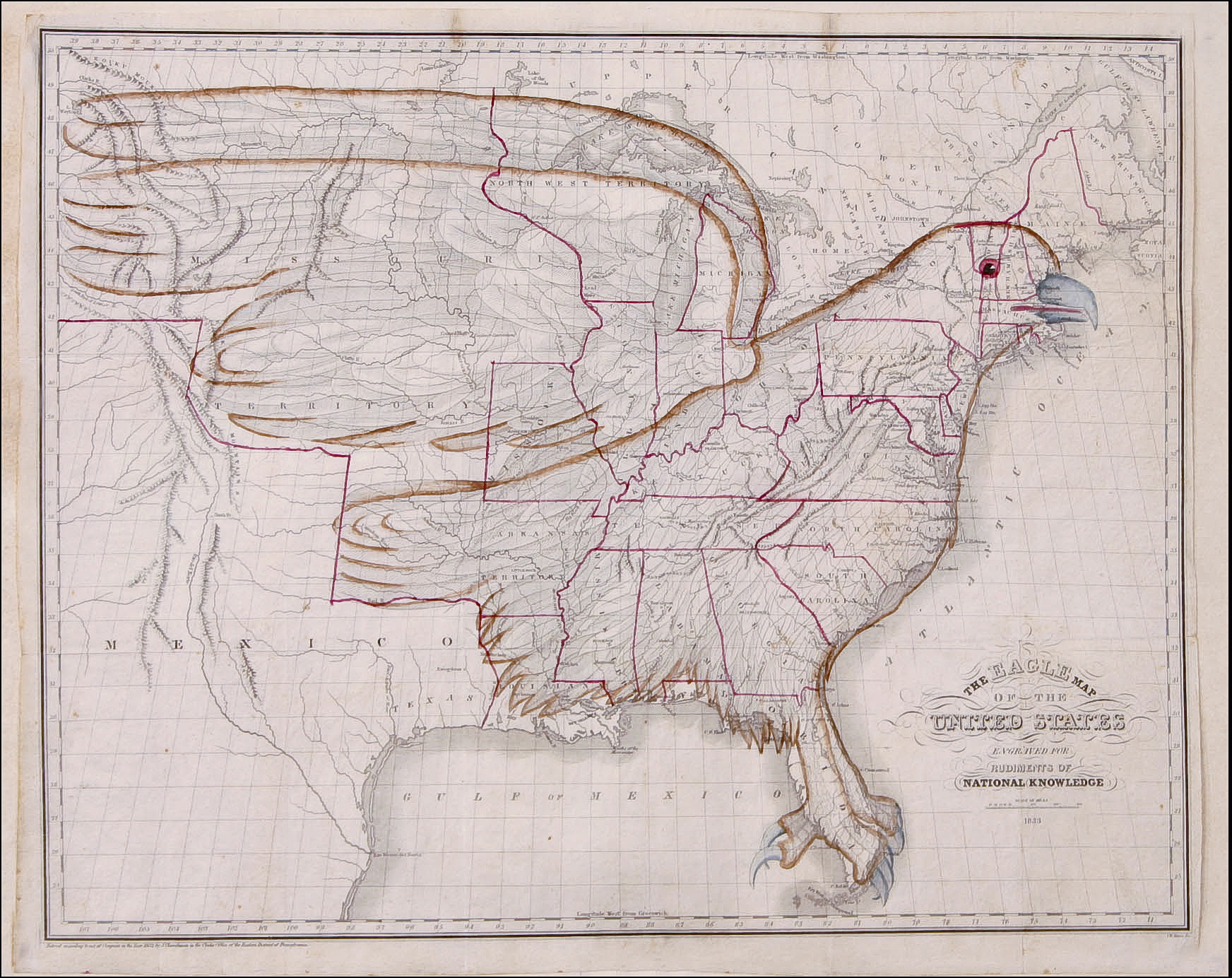
1833 Eagle map of the U.S.

Events from the year 1833 in the United States.

== Incumbents ==
=== Federal government ===
- President: Andrew Jackson (D-Tennessee)
- Vice President:

vacant (until March 4)
Martin Van Buren (D-New York) (starting March 4)

- Chief Justice: John Marshall (Virginia)
- Speaker of the House of Representatives: Andrew Stevenson (D-Virginia)
- Congress: 22nd (until March 4), 23rd (starting March 4)

==== State governments ====
Governors and lieutenant governors

=== Governors ===
- Governor of Alabama: John Gayle (Democratic)
- Governor of Connecticut: John Samuel Peters (National Republican) (until May 1), Henry W. Edwards (Democratic) (starting May 1)
- Governor of Delaware: David Hazzard (National Republican) (until January 15), Caleb P. Bennett (Democratic) (starting January 15)
- Governor of Georgia: Wilson Lumpkin (Democratic)
- Governor of Illinois: John Reynolds (Democratic)
- Governor of Indiana: Noah Noble (Whig)
- Governor of Kentucky: John Breathitt (Democratic)
- Governor of Louisiana: André B. Roman (Whig)
- Governor of Maine: Samuel E. Smith (Democratic)
- Governor of Maryland: George Howard (National Republican) (until January 17), James Thomas (Whig) (starting January 17)
- Governor of Massachusetts: Levi Lincoln Jr. (National Republican)
- Governor of Mississippi:
  - until June 12: Abram M. Scott (Democratic)
  - June 12-November 20: Charles Lynch (Democratic)
  - starting November 20: Hiram Runnels (Democratic)
- Governor of Missouri: Daniel Dunklin (Democratic)
- Governor of New Hampshire: Samuel Dinsmoor (Democratic)
- Governor of New Jersey:
  - until February 27: Samuel L. Southard (Whig)
  - February 27-October 25: Elias P. Seeley (Whig)
  - starting October 25: Peter Dumont Vroom (Democratic)
- Governor of New York: William L. Marcy (Democratic) (starting January 1)
- Governor of North Carolina: David Lowry Swain (National Republican)
- Governor of Ohio: Robert Lucas (Democratic)
- Governor of Pennsylvania: George Wolf (Democratic-Republican)
- Governor of Rhode Island: Lemuel H. Arnold (Whig) (until May 1), John Brown Francis (Democratic) (starting May 1)
- Governor of South Carolina: Robert Young Hayne (Democratic)
- Governor of Tennessee: William Carroll (Democratic)
- Governor of Vermont: William A. Palmer (Anti-Masonic)
- Governor of Virginia: John Floyd (Democratic)

=== Lieutenant governors ===
- Lieutenant Governor of Connecticut: Thaddeus Betts (Whig) (until May 1), Ebenezer Stoddard (Democratic-Republican) (starting May 1)
- Lieutenant Governor of Illinois: Zadok Casey (Democratic) (until March 1), William Lee D. Ewing (Democratic) (starting March 1)
- Lieutenant Governor of Indiana: David Wallace (Whig)
- Lieutenant Governor of Kentucky: James T. Morehead (political party unknown)
- Lieutenant Governor of Massachusetts: Thomas L. Winthrop (political party unknown) (until month and day unknown), Samuel T. Armstrong (political party unknown) (starting month and day unknown)
- Lieutenant Governor of Missouri: Lilburn Boggs (Democratic)
- Lieutenant Governor of New York: John Tracy (Democratic) (starting January 1)
- Lieutenant Governor of Rhode Island: Charles Collins (political party unknown) (until May 1), Jeffrey Hazard (political party unknown) (starting May 1)
- Lieutenant Governor of South Carolina: Charles Cotesworth Pinckney (Democratic)
- Lieutenant Governor of Vermont: Lebbeus Egerton (Anti-Masonic)

== Events ==
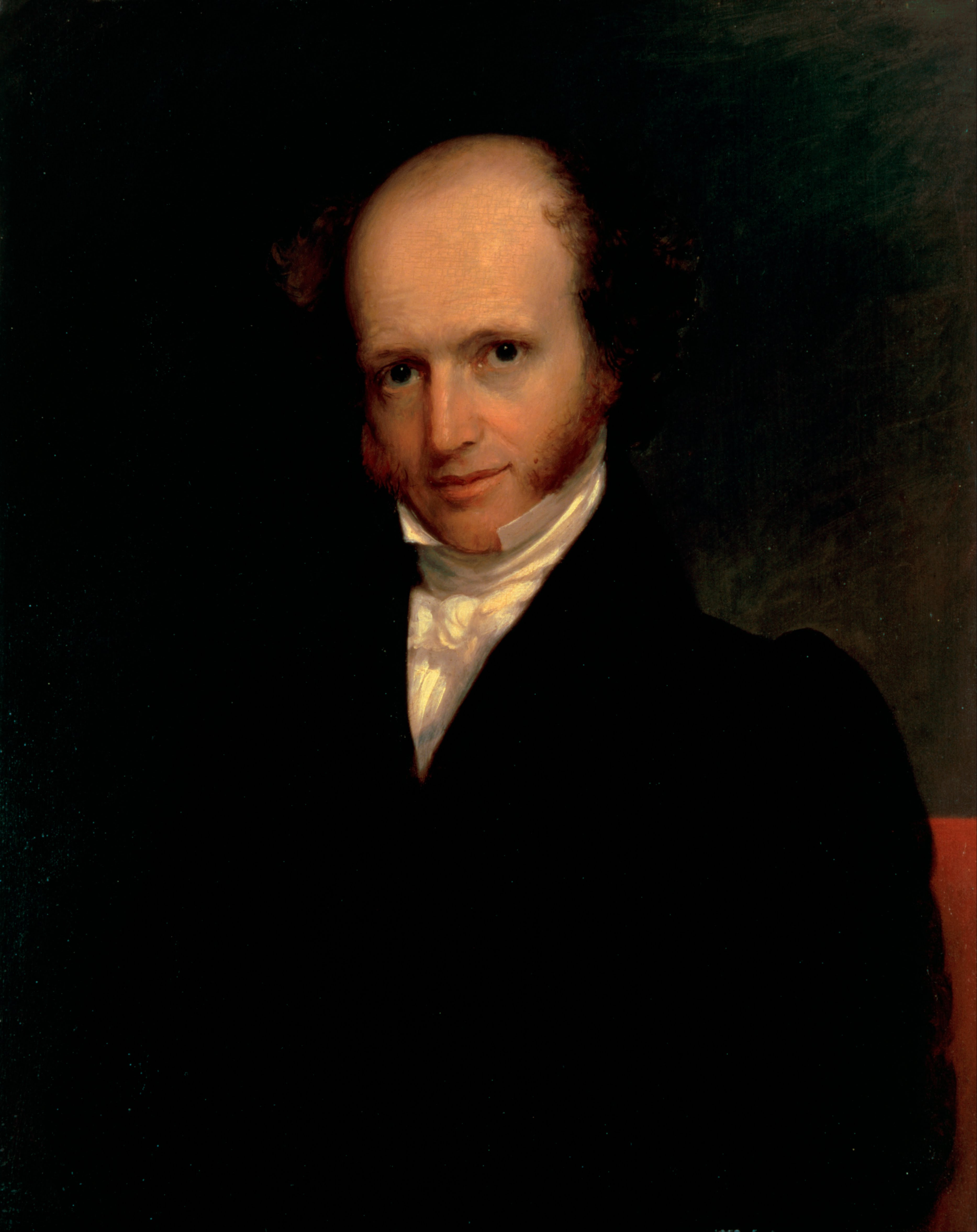
March 4: Martin Van Buren becomes the eighth U.S. vice president

=== January–March ===
- January 1 – Haverford College, located in Haverford, Pennsylvania, is founded by Quakers of the Society of Friends.
- March 2 – President Andrew Jackson signs the Force Bill, which authorizes him to use troops to enforce Federal law in South Carolina.
- March 4 – Andrew Jackson is sworn in for his second term as President of the United States, and Martin Van Buren is sworn in as Vice President of the United States.
- March 16 – Parley's Magazine, a periodical for young readers, publishes its first issue in Boston.

=== April–June ===
- April 23 – A group of interstate slave traders agree to relocate their slave pens outside the city limits of Natchez, Mississippi, to the Forks of the Road.
- May 11 – French-American farmhand Antoine le Blanc murders family of three.
- June 6 – Andrew Jackson becomes the first U.S. president to ride a railroad train.

=== July–September ===
- August 12 – The town of Chicago is established at the estuary of the Chicago River by 350 settlers.
- August 20 – Future President of the United States Benjamin Harrison is born in Ohio. From this date until the death of former U.S. President James Madison on June 28, 1836, there are a total of 18 living presidents of the United States (2 former, 1 current, and 15 known future); more than any other time period in U.S. history.
- September 2 – Oberlin College is founded in Oberlin, Ohio by John Shipherd and Philo P. Stewart.

=== October–December ===
- November 12–13 – "The night the stars fell on Alabama": A spectacular occurrence of the Leonid meteor shower is observed in Alabama.
- November 24 – Psi Upsilon is founded at Union College, becoming the fifth fraternity in the United States.
- December
  - American Anti-Slavery Society founded in Philadelphia by William Lloyd Garrison and Arthur Tappan.
  - Philadelphia Female Anti-Slavery Society is founded; founder members include Sarah Mapps Douglass, Charlotte Forten Grimké and Hetty Reckless.

=== Ongoing ===
- Nullification Crisis (1832–1833)

== Births ==
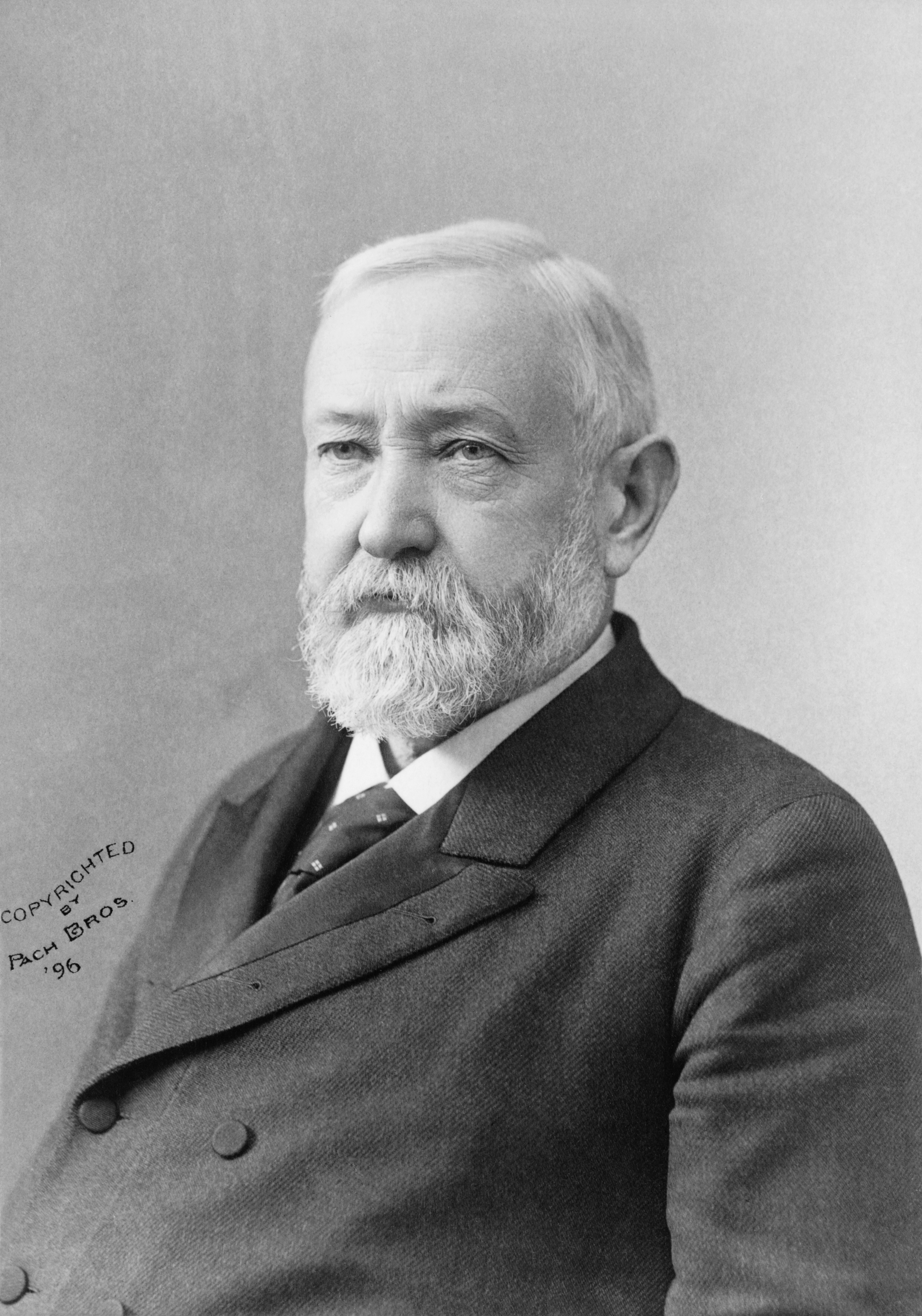
Benjamin Harrison

- January 2 – Frederick A. Johnson, politician (died 1893)
- January 18 – Joseph S. Skerrett, admiral (died 1893)
- February 6 – J. E. B. Stuart, United States Army officer; Confederate States Army general in the American Civil War (died 1864)
- February 11 – Melville Fuller, 8th Chief Justice of the Supreme Court (died 1910)
- March 9 – Thomas W. Osborn, U.S. Senator from Florida from 1868 to 1873 (died 1898)
- March 14 – Lucy Hobbs Taylor, dentist (died 1910)
- March 17 – Charles Edwin Wilbour, Egyptologist (died 1896)
- May 24 – John Killefer, businessman and inventor (died 1926)
- May 27 – Hester Martha Poole, writer, poet and art critic (died 1932)
- June 10 – Pauline Cushman, born Harriet Wood, actress and Union spy in the American Civil War (died 1893)
- June 19 – Mary Tenney Gray, editorial writer, club-woman, philanthropist and suffragette (died 1904)
- August 7 – Powell Clayton, U.S. Senator from Arkansas from 1868 to 1871 (died 1914)
- August 12
  - Lillie Devereux Blake, writer and reformer (died 1913)
  - Isaac L. Ellwood, businessman, rancher and inventor (died 1910)
- August 16 – Eliza Ann Otis, poet, newspaper publisher and philanthropist (died 1904)
- August 20 – Benjamin Harrison, 23rd president of the United States from 1889 to 1893 (died 1901)
- September 21 – James Harvey, U.S. Senator from Kansas from 1833 to 1873 (died 1894)
- October 2 – William Corby, Catholic priest (died 1897)
- October 8 – Edmund Clarence Stedman, poet, critic, essayist, banker and scientist (died 1908)
- November 2 – Horace Howard Furness, Shakespearean scholar (died 1912)
- November 12 – John Martin, U.S. Senator from Kansas from 1893 to 1895 (died 1913)
- November 13 – Edwin Booth, tragic actor (died 1893)
- December 6 – John S. Mosby, Confederate army cavalry battalion commander in the American Civil War (died 1916)
- December 20 – Samuel Mudd, physician implicated in John Wilkes Booth's assassination of Abraham Lincoln in 1865 (died 1883)
- December 29 – John James Ingalls, U.S. Senator from Kansas from 1873 to 1891 (died 1900)

== Deaths ==
- January 17 – William Rush, sculptor (born 1756)
- May 19 – Josiah S. Johnston, U.S. Senator from Louisiana from 1824 to 1833 (born 1784)
- May 23 – Francesca Anna Canfield, poet and translator (born 1803)
- May 24 – John Randolph, planter and congressman, U.S. senator from Virginia from 1825 to 1827 (born 1773)
- June 1 – Oliver Wolcott Jr., 2nd U.S. Secretary of the Treasury (born 1760)
- July 12 – Samuel Sterett, politician (born 1758)
- July 20 – Ninian Edwards, politician, governor of and senator from Illinois (born 1775)
- July 27 – William Bainbridge, United States Navy officer (born 1774)
- September 28 – Lemuel Haynes, clergyman and veteran of the American Revolution (born 1753)

== See also ==
- Timeline of United States history (1820–1859)
- Timeline of the Andrew Jackson presidency § 1833
