= 1831 in the United States =

- Decades: 1810s; 1820s; 1830s; 1840s; 1850s
- See also: History of the United States (1789–1849); Timeline of United States history (1820–1859); List of years in the United States

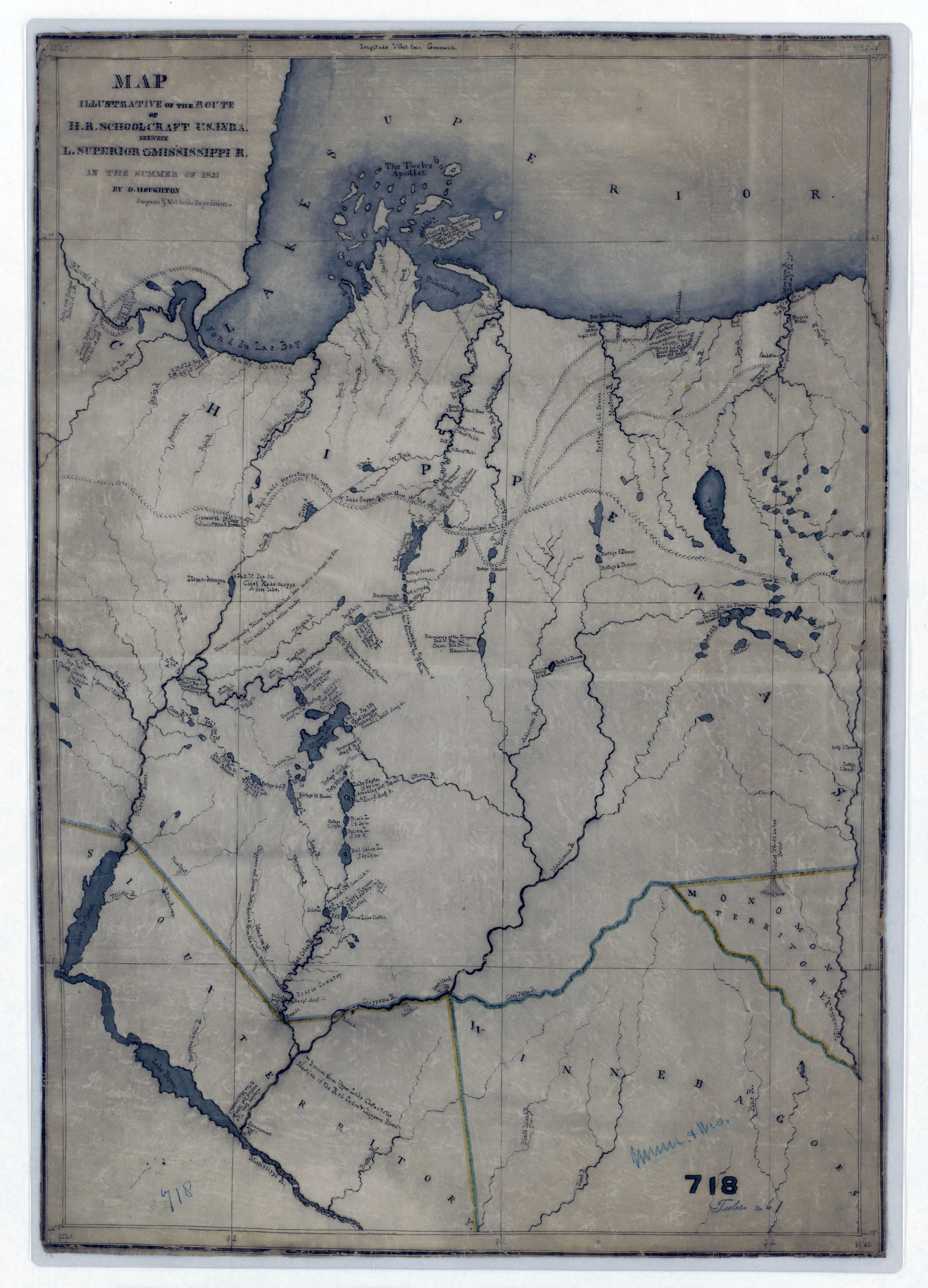
Map of Henry Schoolcraft's route in 1831 showing Ojibwe settlements and roads (NAID 102278798)

Events from the year 1831 in the United States.

== Incumbents ==
=== Federal government ===
- President: Andrew Jackson (D-Tennessee)
- Vice President: John C. Calhoun (D-South Carolina)
- Chief Justice: John Marshall (Virginia)
- Speaker of the House of Representatives: Andrew Stevenson (D-Virginia)
- Congress: 21st (until March 4), 22nd (starting March 4)

==== State governments ====
Governors and lieutenant governors

=== Governors ===
- Governor of Alabama:
  - until March 3: Gabriel Moore (Democratic)
  - March 3-November 26: Samuel B. Moore (Democratic)
  - starting November 26: John Gayle (Democratic)
- Governor of Connecticut: Gideon Tomlinson (Democratic-Republican) (until March 2), John Samuel Peters (National Republican) (starting March 2)
- Governor of Delaware: David Hazzard (National Republican)
- Governor of Georgia: George R. Gilmer (Democratic-Republican) (until November 9), Wilson Lumpkin (Democratic) (starting November 9)
- Governor of Illinois: John Reynolds (Democratic)
- Governor of Indiana: James B. Ray (Independent) (until December 7), Noah Noble (Whig) (starting December 7)
- Governor of Kentucky: Thomas Metcalfe (National Republican)
- Governor of Louisiana: Jacques Dupré (National Republican) (until January 31), André B. Roman (Whig) (starting January 31)
- Governor of Maine: Jonathan G. Hunton (National Republican) (until January 5), Samuel E. Smith (Democratic) (starting January 5)
- Governor of Maryland:
  - until January 13: Thomas King Carroll (Democratic)
  - January 13-July 11: Daniel Martin (National Republican)
  - starting July 11: George Howard (National Republican)
- Governor of Massachusetts: Levi Lincoln Jr. (National Republican)
- Governor of Mississippi: Gerard Brandon (Democratic)
- Governor of Missouri: John Miller (Democratic)
- Governor of New Hampshire:
  - until February 28: Matthew Harvey (Democratic)
  - February 28-June 2: Joseph M. Harper (Democratic)
  - starting June 2: Samuel Dinsmoor (Democratic)
- Governor of New Jersey: Peter Dumont Vroom (Democratic)
- Governor of New York: Enos T. Throop (Democratic)
- Governor of North Carolina: Montfort Stokes (Democratic)
- Governor of Ohio: Duncan McArthur (National Republican)
- Governor of Pennsylvania: George Wolf (Democratic-Republican)
- Governor of Rhode Island: James Fenner (Democratic-Republican) (until May 4), Lemuel H. Arnold (Whig) (starting May 4)
- Governor of South Carolina: James Hamilton Jr. (Democratic)
- Governor of Tennessee: William Carroll (Democratic)
- Governor of Vermont: Samuel C. Crafts (National Republican) (until October 18), William A. Palmer (Anti-Masonic) (starting October 18)
- Governor of Virginia: John Floyd (Democratic)

=== Lieutenant governors ===
- Lieutenant Governor of Connecticut: John Samuel Peters (National Republican) (until March 2), vacant (starting March 2)
- Lieutenant Governor of Illinois: Zadok Casey (Democratic)
- Lieutenant Governor of Indiana: Milton Stapp (Independent) (until December 7), David Wallace (Whig) (starting December 7)
- Lieutenant Governor of Kentucky: John Breathitt (Democratic)
- Lieutenant Governor of Massachusetts: Thomas L. Winthrop (political party unknown)
- Lieutenant Governor of Mississippi: Abram M. Scott (Democratic)
- Lieutenant Governor of Missouri: Daniel Dunklin (Democratic)
- Lieutenant Governor of New York: Edward Philip Livingston (Democratic)
- Lieutenant Governor of Rhode Island: Charles Collins (political party unknown)
- Lieutenant Governor of South Carolina: Patrick Noble (Democratic)
- Lieutenant Governor of Vermont: Mark Richards (National Republican) (until October 18), Lebbeus Egerton (Anti-Masonic) (starting October 18)

== Events ==
=== January–March ===
- January 1 – Abolitionist, William Lloyd Garrison begins publishing The Liberator, an antislavery newspaper, in Boston, Massachusetts.
- March 18 – Cherokee Nation v. Georgia: An injunction requested by the Cherokee nation, claiming that Georgia's state legislature had created laws which, "go directly to annihilate the Cherokees as a political society", is denied.

=== April–June ===
- April 18 – The University of Alabama is founded in Tuscaloosa.
- April 21 – New York University is founded in New York City.

=== July–September ===
- August 7 – American Baptist minister William Miller preaches his first sermon on the Second Advent of Christ in Dresden, New York, launching the Advent Movement in the United States.
- August 21 – Outbreak of Nat Turner's Slave Rebellion in Southampton County, Virginia. Approximately 55 whites are stabbed, shot and clubbed to death. At least 125 enslaved blacks were killed by whites in response.

=== October–December ===
- October 30 – In Southampton County, Virginia, escaped slave Nat Turner is captured and arrested for leading the bloodiest slave revolt in United States history.
- November 5 – Slave leader Nat Turner is tried, convicted, and sentenced to death in Virginia for inciting a violent slave uprising.
- November 11 – In Jerusalem, Virginia, Nat Turner is hanged for leading a violent slave uprising.

=== Undated. ===
- Alexis de Tocqueville visits the United States.
- Founding of:
  - Wesleyan University in Middletown, Connecticut.
  - Xavier University in Cincinnati, Ohio (as "The Athenaeum").

== Births ==
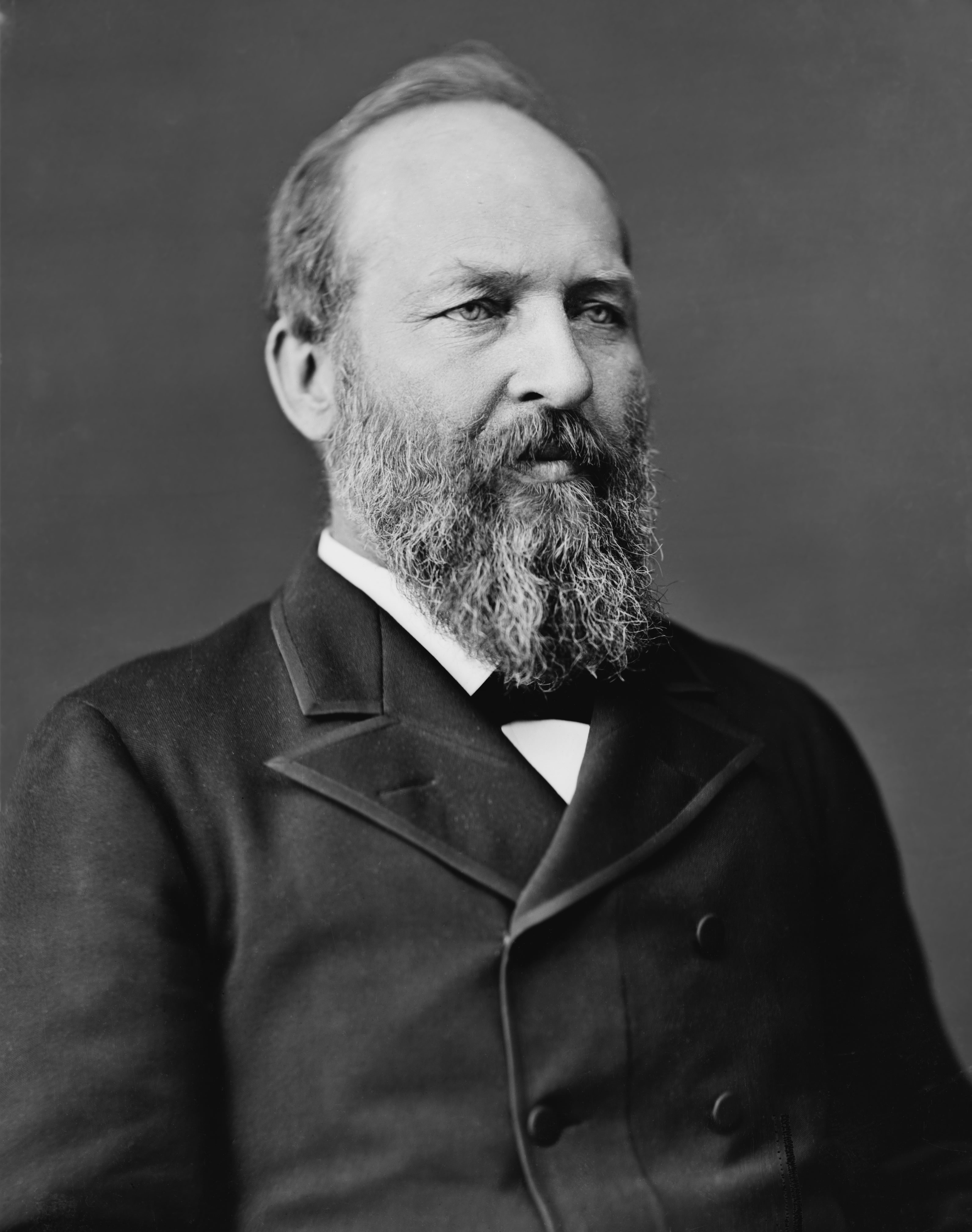
James A. Garfield

- January 2 – Justin Winsor, historian and librarian (died 1897)
- January 14 – William D. Washburn, U.S. Senator from Minnesota from 1889 to 1895 and businessman (died 1912)
- January 15 – Ozora P. Stearns, U.S. Senator from Minnesota in 1871 (died 1896)
- January 26 – Mary Mapes Dodge, children's writer (died 1907)
- February 23 – Elizabeth Litchfield Cunnyngham, missionary and church worker (died 1911)
- March 3 – George Pullman, inventor and industrialist (died 1897)
- March 6 – Philip Sheridan, general (died 1888)
- March 12 – Clement Studebaker, automobile pioneer (died 1901)
- March 14 – Edward A. Perry, Governor of Florida (died 1889)
- March 20 – Solomon L. Spink, U.S. Congressman from Illinois (died 1881)
- May 16 – Daniel Manning, businessman, journalist and politician, Secretary of the Treasury (died 1887)
- June 1 or 29 {exact date unknown) – John Bell Hood, Confederate general (died 1879)
- July 5 – Cordelia A. Greene, physician, reformer, benefactor (died 1905)
- July 8 – John Pemberton, inventor of Coca-Cola (died 1888)
- July 21 – Martha Maxwell, naturalist and artist (died 1881)
- August 26 – Lucy Hayes, First Lady of the United States as wife of Rutherford B. Hayes (died 1889)
- September 3 – States Rights Gist, lawyer, militia general in South Carolina and Confederate Army brigadier general (died 1864)
- September 10 – William A. Peffer, U.S. Senator from Kansas from 1891 to 1897 (died 1912)
- September 20 – Kate Harrington, poet, teacher and writer (died 1917)
- September 29 – John Schofield, general (died 1906)
- October 15 – Helen Hunt Jackson, poet, writer and activist (died 1885)
- October 16 – Lucy Stanton, abolitionist (died 1910)
- October 28 – Charles Colcock Jones Jr., Georgia politician, attorney, historian and folklorist (died 1893)
- October 29 – Othniel Charles Marsh, paleontologist (died 1899)
- October 31 – Romualdo Pacheco, Governor of California (died 1899)
- November 19 – James A. Garfield, 20th president of the United States from March to September 1881 (died 1881)
- November 21 – John Franklin Miller, U.S. Senator from California from 1881 to 1886 (died 1886)
- November 22 – Thomas J. Latham, lawyer and businessman (died 1911)
- December 19 – Bernice Pauahi Bishop, Hawaiian aliʻi (died 1884)

== Deaths ==
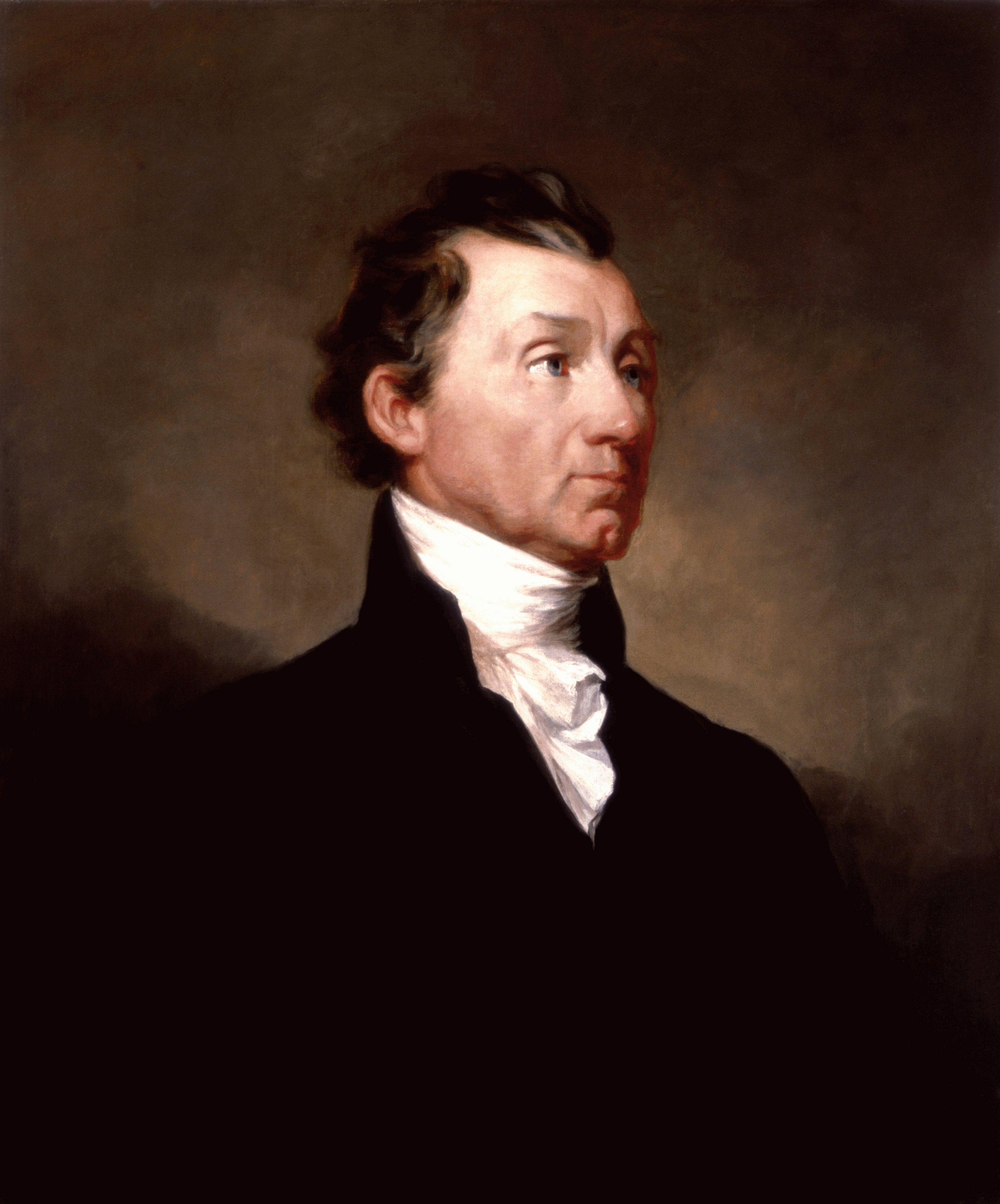
James Monroe

- March 26 – Richard Allen, founder of the African Methodist Episcopal Church in 1794 (born 1760)
- April 4 – Isaiah Thomas, publisher (born 1749)
- May 11 – John Trumbull, poet (born 1750)
- May 24 –
  - James Peale, miniaturist and still-life painter (born 1749)
  - Benjamin Carr, composer, singer, teacher, and music publisher (born 1768)
- May 27 – Jedediah Smith, explorer, hunter, trapper and fur trader (born 1799)
- July 4 – James Monroe, fifth president of the United States from 1817 to 1825 (born 1758)
- November 1 – Black Hoof, chief of the Shawnee (Šaawanooaki) in Ohio
- November 11 – Nat Turner, leader of slave rebellion (born 1800)
- December 8 – James Hoban, architect of the White House (born 1755 in Ireland)

== See also ==
- Timeline of United States history (1820–1859)
- Timeline of the Andrew Jackson presidency § 1831
