= 1829 Maine gubernatorial election =

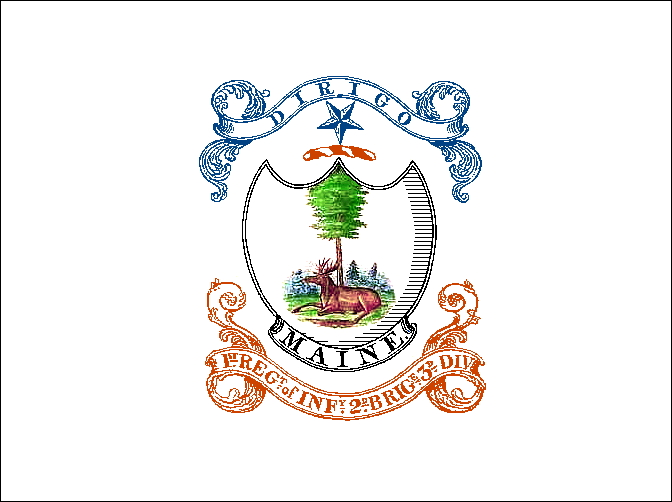
- September 14, 1829
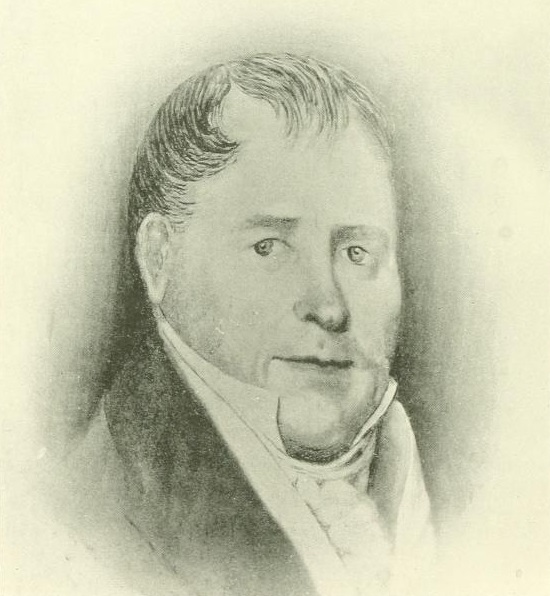

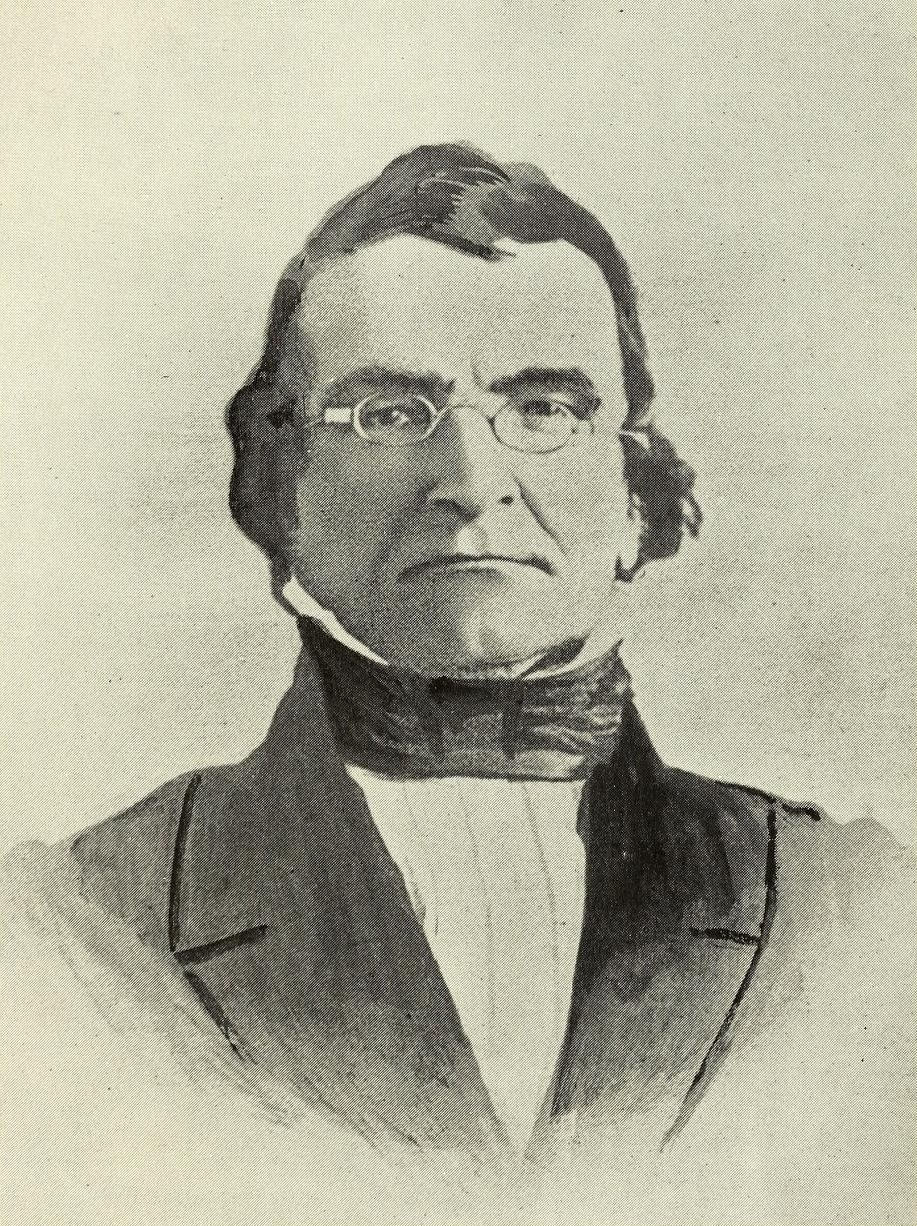
Nominee	Jonathan G. Hunton	Samuel E. Smith
Party	National Republican	Democratic
Popular vote	23,315	22,991
Percentage	50.08%	49.39%
- County results Hunton: 40–50% 50–60% 60–70% Smith: 50–60% 70–80%
Governor before election
Enoch Lincoln
Democratic-Republican
Elected Governor
Jonathan G. Hunton
National Republican

The 1829 Maine gubernatorial election took place on September 14, 1829. Incumbent Democratic-Republican Governor Enoch Lincoln did not run for re-election. National Republican candidate Jonathan G. Hunton defeated Democratic candidate Samuel E. Smith in an extremely close election. Hunton defeated Smith by just 324 votes, one of the narrowest margins in Maine gubernatorial history.

== Results ==
=== Candidates ===
- Jonathan G. Hunton, lawyer, member of Maine's Executive Council (National Republican)
- Samuel E. Smith, lawyer, associate justice for the Maine Court of Common Pleas, former state representative (Democratic)

1829 Maine gubernatorial election
Party	Candidate	Votes	%
National Republican	Jonathan G. Hunton	23,315	50.08%
Democratic	Samuel E. Smith	22,991	49.39%
Write-in		245	0.53%
Majority		324	0.69%
Total votes		46,551	100.00%
National Republican gain from Democratic-Republican			

== Aftermath ==
Governor Lincoln died in Augusta, Maine, on October 8, 1829, prior to the expiration of his term. Maine does not have a lieutenant governor so under the rules of succession the Presidents of the Maine Senate Nathan Cutler was sworn into office. However Cutler's term as President of the Senate expired on January 6, 1830 and the Maine Supreme Court ruled that Cutler's term as governor also expired. The election for a new President of the Senate was protracted due to several vacancies and an equal split of Democrats and National Republicans. Joshua Hall was elected to serve the remainder of the term until Hunton was sworn in on February 9, 1830.
