= Killefer =

Killefer is a surname. Notable people with the surname include:

- Bill Killefer (1887–1960), American baseball player, coach and manager
- John Killefer (1833–1926), American businessman and inventor
- Nancy Killefer (born 1953), American government consultant and political figure
- Red Killefer (1885–1958), American baseball player
