= Governor Cutler =

Governor Cutler may refer to:

- John Christopher Cutler (1846–1928), 2nd Governor of Utah
- Nathan Cutler (1775–1861), 7th Governor of Maine
