= 1830 Maine gubernatorial election =

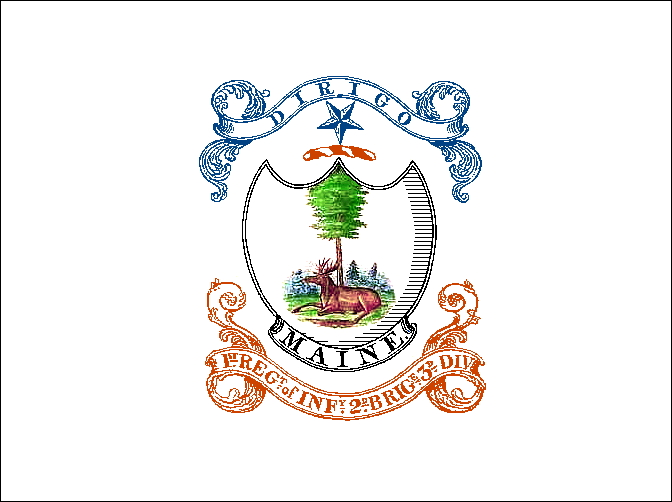
- September 13, 1830
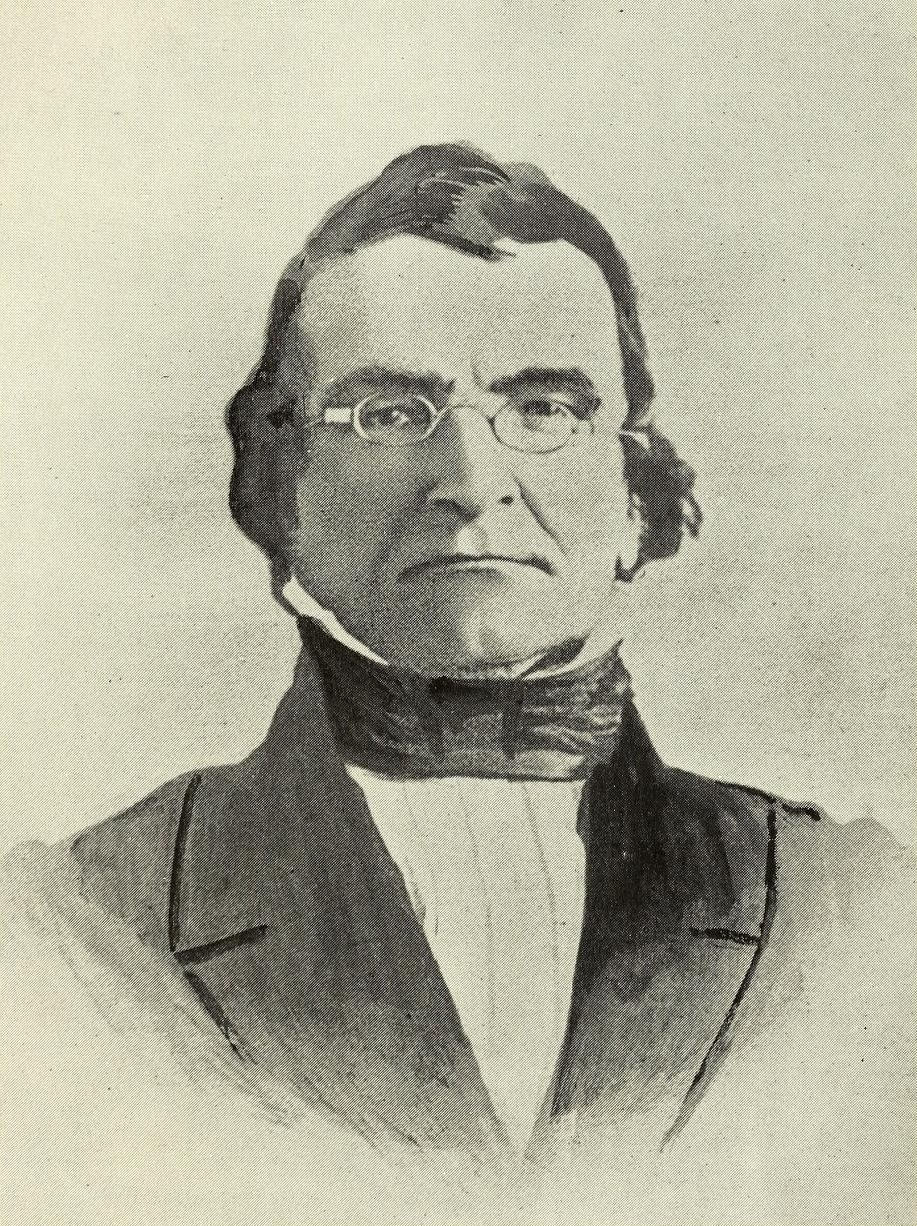

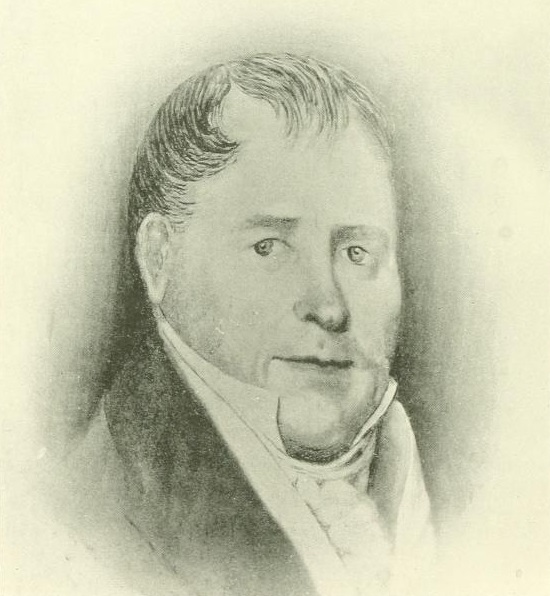
Nominee	Samuel E. Smith	Jonathan G. Hunton
Party	Democratic	National Republican
Popular vote	30,215	28,639
Percentage	51.13%	48.47%
- County results Smith: 50–60% 60–70% Hunton: 50–60% 60–70%
Governor before election
Jonathan G. Hunton
National Republican
Elected Governor
Samuel E. Smith
Democratic

The 1830 Maine gubernatorial election took place on September 13, 1830. Incumbent National Republican Governor Jonathan G. Hunton was defeated for re-election by Democratic candidate Samuel E. Smith in a re-match of the previous year's election.

== Results ==
=== Candidates ===
- Jonathan G. Hunton, incumbent governor (National Republican)
- Samuel E. Smith, lawyer, associate justice for the Maine Court of Common Pleas, Democratic candidate for governor in 1829, former state representative (Democratic)

1830 Maine gubernatorial election
Party	Candidate	Votes	%	±%
Democratic	Samuel E. Smith	30,215	51.13%	▲1.74
National Republican	Jonathan G. Hunton (incumbent)	28,639	48.47%	▼1.61
Write-in		238	0.40%	▼0.13
Majority		1,576	2.66%	▲1.97
Total votes		59,092	100.00%	▲26.94
Democratic gain from National Republican				
