= Enoch Lincoln =

American politician (1788–1829)

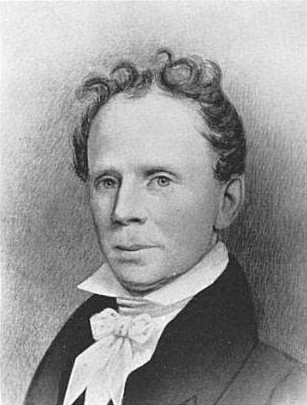

6th Governor of Maine
- In office January 3, 1827 – October 8, 1829
- Preceded by: Albion Parris
- Succeeded by: Nathan Cutler

Member of the U.S. House of Representatives
- In office November 4, 1818 – January 1826
- Preceded by: Albion Parris
- Succeeded by: James W. Ripley
- Constituency: Massachusetts 20th (1818–1821); Maine 7th (1821–1823); Maine 5th (1823–1826)

Personal details
- Born: December 28, 1788 Worcester, Massachusetts, U.S.
- Died: October 8, 1829 (aged 40) Augusta, Maine, U.S.
- Party: Democratic-Republican; National Republican
- Education: Harvard College
- Profession: Lawyer

Enoch Lincoln (December 28, 1788 – October 8, 1829) was an American politician, serving as U.S. Representative from, successively, Massachusetts and from Maine. He was the son of Levi Lincoln Sr. and his wife, and the younger brother of Levi Lincoln Jr. He served as the sixth governor of Maine from 1827 until his death in 1829.

Born in Worcester, Massachusetts, Lincoln graduated from Harvard College in 1807 where he had studied law. He was admitted to the bar began practice out of Salem, Massachusetts, in 1811. He served as United States district attorney 1815–1818. In 1819, Lincoln moved to Paris, District of Maine following a successful November 1818 election bid for US Representative of the Commonwealth of Massachusetts in Fifteenth United States Congress, filling Albion K. Parris's resigned seat. While serving this term, (November 4, 1818, to March 3, 1821), Congress admitted Maine as an independent state. Lincoln was three times re-elected to Congress for the Sixteenth and Seventeenth and Eighteenth sessions as US Representative for the State of Maine.

Lincoln continued the practice of law in Paris, Maine, and was elected a member of the American Antiquarian Society in 1819. A portion of his business and personal papers resides in the manuscript collections of the AAS within the Lincoln Family Papers.

Lincoln was elected as a Democratic-Republican from Maine, next reelected as an Adams-Clay Republican and finally reelected in his third term as a Pro-Adams candidate. He won three terms, all with more than 90% of the vote. Elected governor of the State of Maine, he resigned from Congress in 1826 and was sworn in governor in 1827.

While in office in Augusta, Maine, Lincoln died on October 8, 1829. His term had not yet expired but it was after the election of his successor Jonathan G. Hunton. Serving in the interim were two Presidents of the Maine Senate, Nathan Cutler and Joshua Hall.

Fourteen years after his death, Lincoln was re-interned to a Capitol Park mausoleum opposite the Maine State House, in Augusta. The tomb, later opened during 1989 construction, found his remains were missing.

The town of Lincoln, Maine, is named for him.

Lincoln was distantly related to President Abraham Lincoln, sharing common ancestor Samuel Lincoln, who had settled in Hingham, Massachusetts, in the 17th century.

U.S. House of Representatives
Preceded by Albion K. Parris	Member of the U.S. House of Representatives from Massachusetts's 20th congressional district November 4, 1818 – March 3, 1821	Succeeded by District moved to Maine
Preceded by District moved from Massachusetts	Member of the U.S. House of Representatives from Maine's 7th congressional district March 4, 1821 – March 3, 1823	Succeeded by David Kidder
Preceded by Ebenezer Herrick	Member of the U.S. House of Representatives from Maine's 5th congressional district March 4, 1823 – 1826	Succeeded by James W. Ripley
Political offices
Preceded by Albion Parris	6th Governor of Maine; January 3, 1827 – October 8, 1829	Succeeded by Nathan Cutler
