= S. S. Cook =

American politician

Member of the Washington House of Representatives
- In office 1889–1891

Personal details
- Born: November 3, 1832 Trumbull County, Ohio, United States
- Died: May 10, 1919 (aged 86) Turlock, California, United States
- Party: Republican

Seymour Samuel Cook (November 3, 1832 – May 10, 1919) was an American politician in the state of Washington. He served in the Washington House of Representatives from 1889 to 1891.
