= Jennie S. Perkins =

American poet

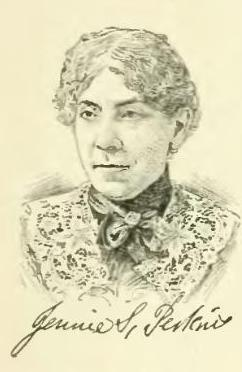
Jennie S. Perkins from The Biographical Dictionary of America

Jennie Saunders Perkins (1832–1912) was an American poet.

== Biography ==
She was born near Purdy, Tennessee, on April 8, 1832, the daughter of Lindsey and Martha Ann (Landreth) Saunders; she was descended from settlers who had come to Chatham County, North Carolina, near the close of the eighteenth century and had moved to McNairy County, Tennessee, in 1825. She attended common school and developed a literary taste at an early age, and before the Civil War, many of her poems were published in the leading papers of the South, over the signature of "Jennie S.," and attracted attention. General Marcus Joseph Wright, a native of her county and a resident of Memphis, was prominent in the business and literary circles of his adopted city, and having seen some of her poems, became interested in the success of his former neighbor and advised and encouraged her.

In 1863 she married E.D.M. Perkins, and the couple would eventually have seven children. She continued writing, and in 1872 received the second prize (of fifty contestants) for the best poem on the Trenton Massacre. The family moved to Florida in 1878, and while there some of her best poems were published and were widely distributed throughout the country, including: "From Tennessee to Florida," "Lake Beauclaire," "Florida Winter," and "Summer on the St. Johns." After a dozen years in Florida, they moved to Washington, where she continued to contribute numerous poems, floral articles, and biographical sketches to leading papers and magazines. Here, her lengthiest and most elaborate epic, "Grant", was also written.

She died at her son's home in Jacksonville, Florida on May 1, 1912, and is buried in Tennessee.
