= Joseph Hodgkins =

American Revolutionary War officer

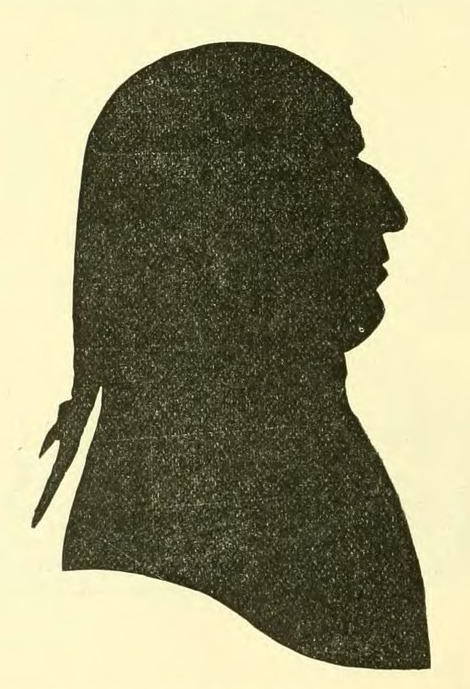
- Born: Joseph Hodgkins; Aug. 28, 1743
- Died: Sept. 25, 1829 (Aged 86); Ipswich, Massachusetts
- Resting place: Ipswich's Old North Burial Ground
- Occupations: Cordwainer, Soldier
- Known for: Service during the American Revolutionary War and letters to his wife
- Spouse(s): 1. Joanna Webber, 2. Sarah Hodgkins
- Children: Hannah Wade (mother: Joanna Webber), only child to survive to adulthood

Joseph Hodgkins (August 28, 1743 – September 25, 1829) was an Ipswich, Massachusetts cordwainer who would later go on to serve as an officer in the American Revolutionary War. The letters between Hodgkins and his wife, Sarah, have served as important historical footnotes since the early 1900s for understanding the Revolutionary War and have been featured in such books as the Library of America's The American Revolution: Writings from the War of Independence, David McCullough's 1776, and Ray Raphael's A People's History of the American Revolution.

== Military service ==
On January 24, 1775, the Massachusetts Provincial Congress formed a special company of Minuteman in which Captain Nathaniel Wade would be the commander and Lieutenant Hodgkins would be the second in command. From January 1775 to January 1776, Hodgkins served in the Minuteman Company under Wade and would be placed on alert for the Battle of Concord and Battle of Lexington before being moved to take part in the Siege of Boston. Wade and Hodgkins bravely led their minutemen company at the Battle of Bunker Hill and would later be added to the New England Army following the successes at Boston. In January 1776, he and many of his fellow minutemen reenlisted and were transferred to New York. He would see action in the Battle of Long Island, Battle of Harlem Heights, Battle of White Plains, take part in the retreat from New York, and assist in the Battle of Trenton.

December 31, 1776, proved to be one of the darkest hours for General Washington as the enlistments of many soldiers ended. As many soldiers left the army, including those from Ipswich, Hodgkins reenlisted along with Wade. Hodgkins was immediately promoted to captain and given his own company. Meanwhile, his friend Wade was eventually promoted to lieutenant colonel and made aide-de-camp to General George Washington, and was placed in command of West Point, New York after the treason of General Benedict Arnold. Hodgkins would go on to lead his company in the Battles of Saratoga and would be one of the junior officers that would help oversee the surrender of General John Burgoyne's army.

Historical records of Hodgkins service after Saratoga are difficult to find, but he would return home in 1779. After the war, he served as a colonel in the Massachusetts Militia. He lived in Ipswich throughout the rest of his years and would even serve in various political capacities in the town. At one point he even served in the Massachusetts Legislature.

== Sarah Hodgkins ==
Sarah Hodgkins (née Perkins) (April 28, 1750 – March 1803) was the daughter of Jeremiah and Joanna Perkins. Her father was a cooper and one of original settlers of Ipswich. From 1776 to 1779, Sarah and Joseph would exchange letters as Joseph served in the Continental Army during its darkest hours. Amongst her more famous writings, she is known for writing, "So I must be contented to live a widow..." to Joseph to express her fear for his safety.

Sarah and Joseph had several children, but only his daughter Hannah survived into adulthood to marry and have children. Hannah married the son of Colonel Nathaniel Wade, Joseph's former commanding officer.

== Death ==
Hodgkins died of old age on September 25, 1829, and would be buried near his wife in Ipswich's Old North Burial Ground. He and his wife are largely regarded as local heroes in Ipswich and a burial memorial was even constructed for the Colonel. The Hodgkins' letters, along with those of Wade, ended up in the hands of Herbert T. Wade – Wade's and Hodgkins' great-great-grandson – and would be preserved and published by Dr. Robert Lively of Princeton University in The Adventures of Two Company Grade Officers in Washington's Army in 1958. The letters have since been featured in several works of non-fiction including Library of America's The American Revolution: Writings from the War of Independence, David McCullough's 1776, and Ray Raphael's A People's History of the American Revolution.

== See also ==
The complete letters of Joseph and Sarah Hodgkins transcribed to easily readable English by the Ipswich MA town historian.
