= Joshua Hall =

American politician

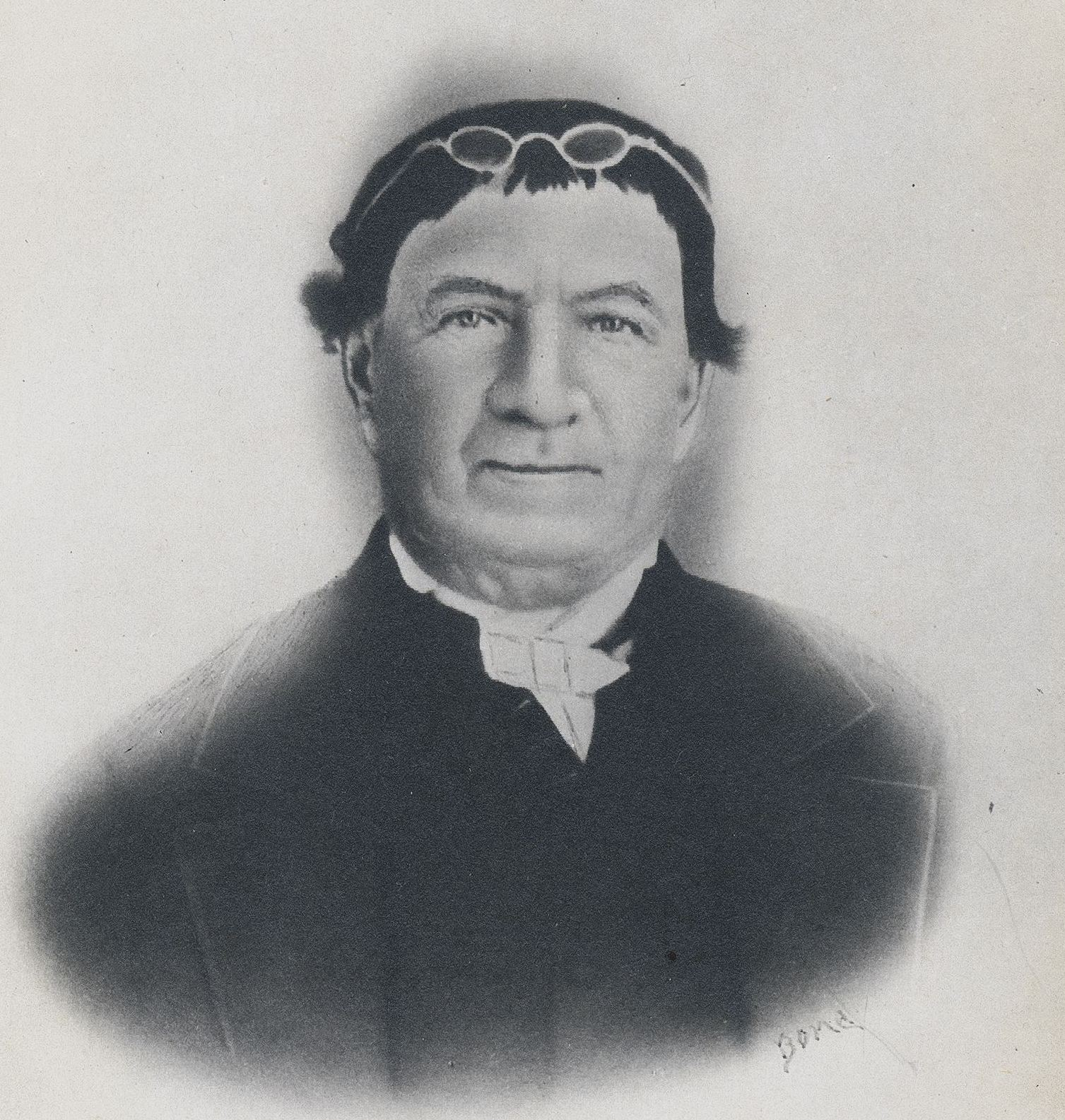

8th Governor of Maine
- In office January 6, 1830 – February 9, 1830
- Preceded by: Nathan Cutler
- Succeeded by: Jonathan G. Hunton

9th President of the Maine Senate
- In office 1830–1830
- Preceded by: Nathan Cutler
- Succeeded by: F.O.J. Smith

Member of the Maine Senate

Personal details
- Born: October 22, 1768 Lewes, Colony of Delaware, British America
- Died: December 25, 1862 (aged 94) Frankfort, Maine, U.S.
- Party: Democratic
- Profession: Methodist minister

Joshua Hall (October 22, 1768 – December 25, 1862) was an American legislator who served as the eighth governor of Maine for 34 days in 1830.

Hall, a Methodist minister in Frankfort, Maine, was elected to the Maine Senate in 1830 and was chosen as President of the Maine Senate. After Governor Enoch Lincoln died in office, he was succeeded by the then Maine Senate president Nathan Cutler. The Maine Supreme Court, however, ruled that Cutler could not remain in office as Governor past the expiration of his Senate term on January 6, 1830. Hall as the new President of the Maine Senate was then sworn in as acting Governor, serving until the inauguration of Jonathan Hunton on February 9, 1830. Hall then retired from politics and returned to preaching.

== See also ==
- List of governors of Maine

== Notes ==
Political offices
Preceded by Nathan Cutler	8th Governor of Maine; January 6, 1830 – February 9, 1830	Succeeded by Jonathan Hunton
Preceded by Nathan Cutler	9th President of the Maine Senate; 1830-1830	Succeeded by F.O.J. Smith
Honorary titles
Preceded by William Plumer	Oldest living United States governor December 22, 1850 – December 25, 1862	Succeeded by Joseph Ritner
Preceded by William Plumer	Oldest United States governor ever April 20, 1860 – November 5, 1890	Succeeded by Nathaniel S. Berry
