= John Killefer =

John Killefer (May 24, 1833 – July 1926) was a businessman and inventor. He apprenticed for two years as a blacksmith beginning in 1850, then moved to southern California and bought an orange grove. He soon noticed the phenomenon referred to as hardpan (the creation of a water resistant soil layer). Sometime in 1892 he designed and created the chisel plough for land tilling to prevent or defeat hardpanning. He founded Killefer Manufacturing Company in 1893 in San Bernardino, California. He relocated his company to Palmetto Street, Los Angeles, California in 1895 to lower overhead costs for the production of his plow. His son took over the company before it was sold to Deere & Company in 1937.
