= Jonathan G. Hunton =

American politician (1781–1851)

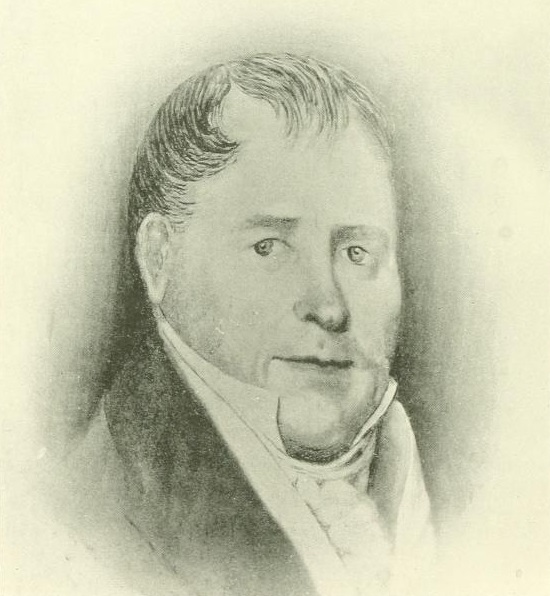

9th Governor of Maine
- In office February 9, 1830 – January 5, 1831
- Preceded by: Joshua Hall
- Succeeded by: Samuel E. Smith

Member of the Maine Senate

Member of the Maine House of Representatives
- In office 1832–1834

Personal details
- Born: March 14, 1781 Unity, New Hampshire, U.S.
- Died: October 12, 1851 (aged 70) Dixmont, Maine, U.S.
- Party: National Republican
- Profession: Lawyer

Jonathan Glidden Hunton (March 14, 1781 – October 12, 1851) was an American politician who served as the ninth governor of Maine from February 1830 to January 1831.

== Early years ==
Hunton was born in Unity, New Hampshire, on March 14, 1781. He was educated at local schools. He later studied law.

== Career ==
He started his law career in Readfield, Maine. He serving as a member of the Governor's Executive Council in 1829. Later in 1829, he ran for governorship of Maine. He was elected as a National Republican. He was in the governor's office from February 9, 1830, to January 5, 1831. During his term, he advocated the establishment of the state's first mental hospital. Hunton was unsuccessful in his re-election bid.

== Later years ==
After leaving the office, he served as a member of the Maine Senate and the Maine House of Representatives from 1832 to 1834. He then practiced law. The later part of his life was spent in Dixmont, Maine. He died on October 12, 1851, in Fairfield. His remains were carried to Readfield Corner Cemetery for burial.

== Sources ==
- Sobel, Robert and John Raimo. Biographical Directory of the Governors of the United States, 1789-1978. Greenwood Press, 1988. ISBN 0-313-28093-2
- A Collection of Biographical Sketches of all the Governors since the formation of the State. Prepaired under the direction of Henry Chase https://www.onlinebiographies.info/gov/me/hunton-jonathan.htm

Party political offices
| First | National Republican nominee for Governor of Maine; 1829, 1830 | Succeeded by Daniel Goodenow |
Political offices
| Preceded by Joshua Hall | Governor of Maine; 1830–1831 | Succeeded by Samuel E. Smith |
