= Samuel E. Smith =

American politician (1788–1860)

Samuel Emerson Smith
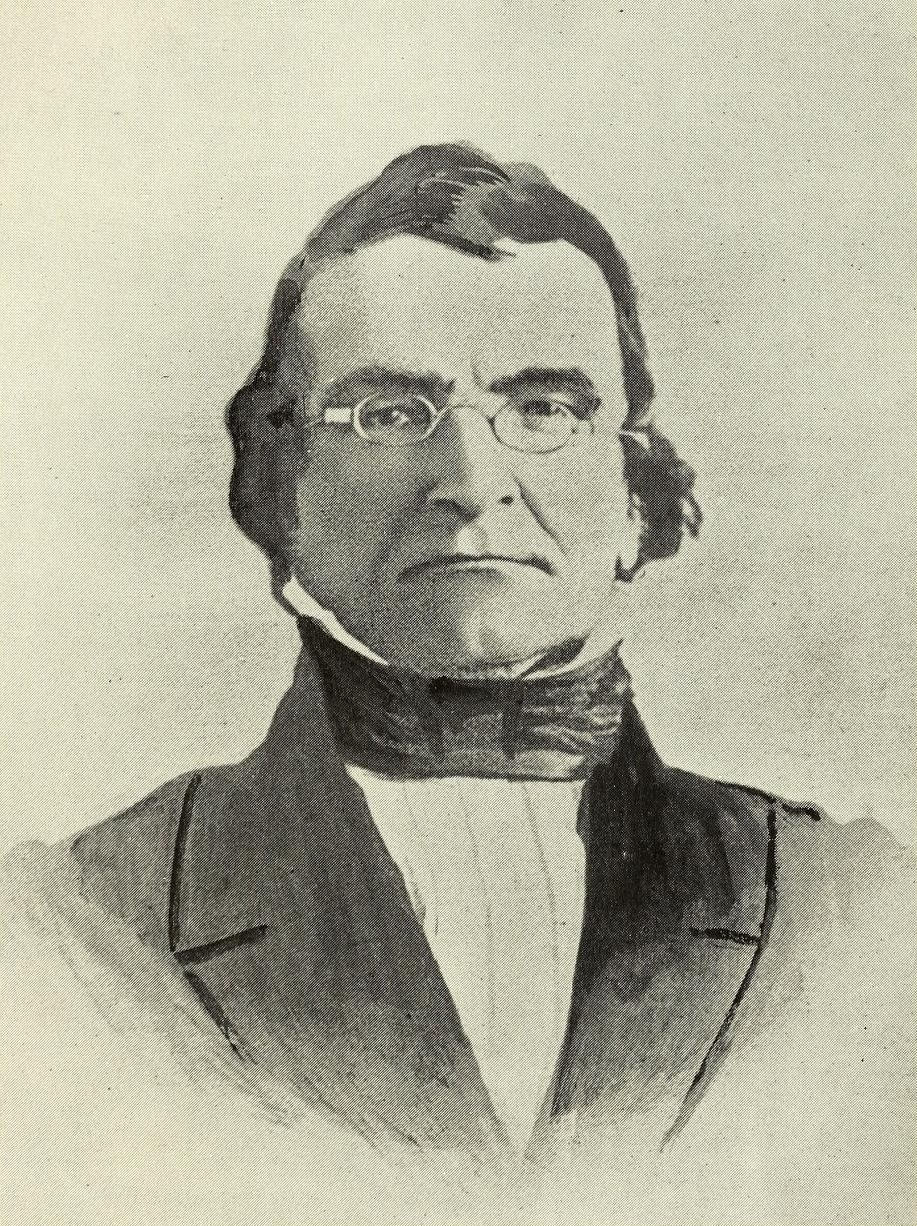

10th Governor of Maine
- In office January 5, 1831 – January 1, 1834
- Preceded by: Jonathan G. Hunton
- Succeeded by: Robert P. Dunlap

Member of the Maine House of Representatives
- In office 1820–1821

Personal details
- Born: March 12, 1788 Hollis, New Hampshire, U.S.
- Died: March 4, 1860 (aged 71) Wiscasset, Maine
- Party: Democratic
- Education: Harvard University
- Profession: Lawyer

Samuel Emerson Smith (March 12, 1788 – March 4, 1860) was an American politician from Maine. Smith served as the tenth governor of Maine.

== Early life ==
Smith was born in Hollis, New Hampshire on March 12, 1788. He graduated from Harvard University in 1808. He then studied law.

== Career ==
Smith was admitted to the bar in 1812. Smith practiced law in Wiscasset, Maine. He served as a representative to the Massachusetts General Court in 1819. He was as a member of the Maine House of Representatives from 1820 to 1821. In 1821 he was appointed chief justice of the Circuit Court of Common Pleas of the Second District and upon the reorganization of the court system, became an associate judge of its replacement court from 1822 to 1830.

== Governor of Maine ==
Smith became the Governor of Maine in 1831. During his administration, the state capitol was moved from Portland to Augusta. The controversy over the northeastern boundary of the US, mainly the border between Maine and New Brunswick, continued to escalate. He left office on January 1, 1834.

== Later life ==
After leaving the office, Smith was reappointed to the Court of Common Pleas. He served there from 1835 to 1837. He died unexpectedly on March 4, 1860 in Wiscasset, Maine due to heart issues.

== Sources ==
- Sobel, Robert and John Raimo. Biographical Directory of the Governors of the United States, 1789-1978. Greenwood Press, 1988. ISBN 0-313-28093-2

Party political offices
First	Democratic nominee for Governor of Maine; 1829, 1830, 1831, 1832	Succeeded by Robert P. Dunlap
Political offices
Preceded by Jonathan G. Hunton	Governor of Maine; 1831-1834	Succeeded by Robert P. Dunlap
