= Nathan Cutler =

American politician (1775–1861)

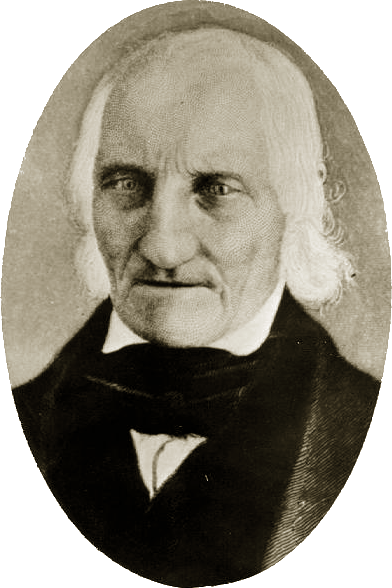
- Cutler circa 1850

7th Governor of Maine
- In office October 8, 1829 – January 6, 1830
- Preceded by: Enoch Lincoln
- Succeeded by: Joshua Hall

President of the Maine Senate
- In office 1829–1829
- Preceded by: Robert P. Dunlap
- Succeeded by: Joshua Hall

Member of the Maine Senate

Member of the Maine House of Representatives
- In office 1844–1844

Personal details
- Born: May 29, 1775 Lexington, Province of Massachusetts Bay, British America
- Died: June 8, 1861 (aged 86) Warren, Massachusetts, U.S.
- Party: Democratic
- Education: Dartmouth College, 1798

Nathan Cutler (May 29, 1775 – June 8, 1861) was an American politician in Massachusetts and Maine. He was a Democrat.

Cutler graduated from Dartmouth College in 1798, and was preceptor at Middlebury Academy for one year thereafter. He then studied law with Judge Chipman of Vermont and later in Worcester, Massachusetts, where he was admitted to the bar in 1801. For a time he practised in his native town before moving to Farmington, Maine, in 1803, where he lived for the rest of his life. In 1812, he was appointed Judge of the Court of Common Pleas but declined to accept the office. He was several times a member of the Legislature of Massachusetts before the separation of the District of Maine. He was a delegate to the Maine Constitutional Convention in 1819 that framed the Constitution of the State of Maine, and subsequently became active in public life and politics in Maine. He was many times a member of the Legislature of Maine. In 1828, he was elected to the Maine Senate, and served as Senate president. When Governor Enoch Lincoln died on October 8, 1829, Cutler was sworn in as the seventh governor of Maine, serving until the expiration of his Senate term on January 6, 1830. Cutler was a presidential elector in 1832, and served in the Maine House of Representatives in 1844.

He was one of the incorporators of Farmington Academy and during his lifetime president of the board of trustees. He was deeply interested in classical studies, of which he was a lifelong student.

He married Hannah Moore of Warren, Massachusetts, on September 10, 1804. They had nine children, of whom seven survived to adulthood. Hannah died in 1835. He married Harriet Weld née Easterbrooks of Brunswick, Maine, in 1856.

Political offices
Preceded by Enoch Lincoln	Governor of Maine; 1829–1830	Succeeded by Joshua Hall
Preceded by Robert P. Dunlap	President of the Maine Senate; 1829	Succeeded by Joshua Hall
