= Thomas L. Winthrop =

American politician (1760–1841)

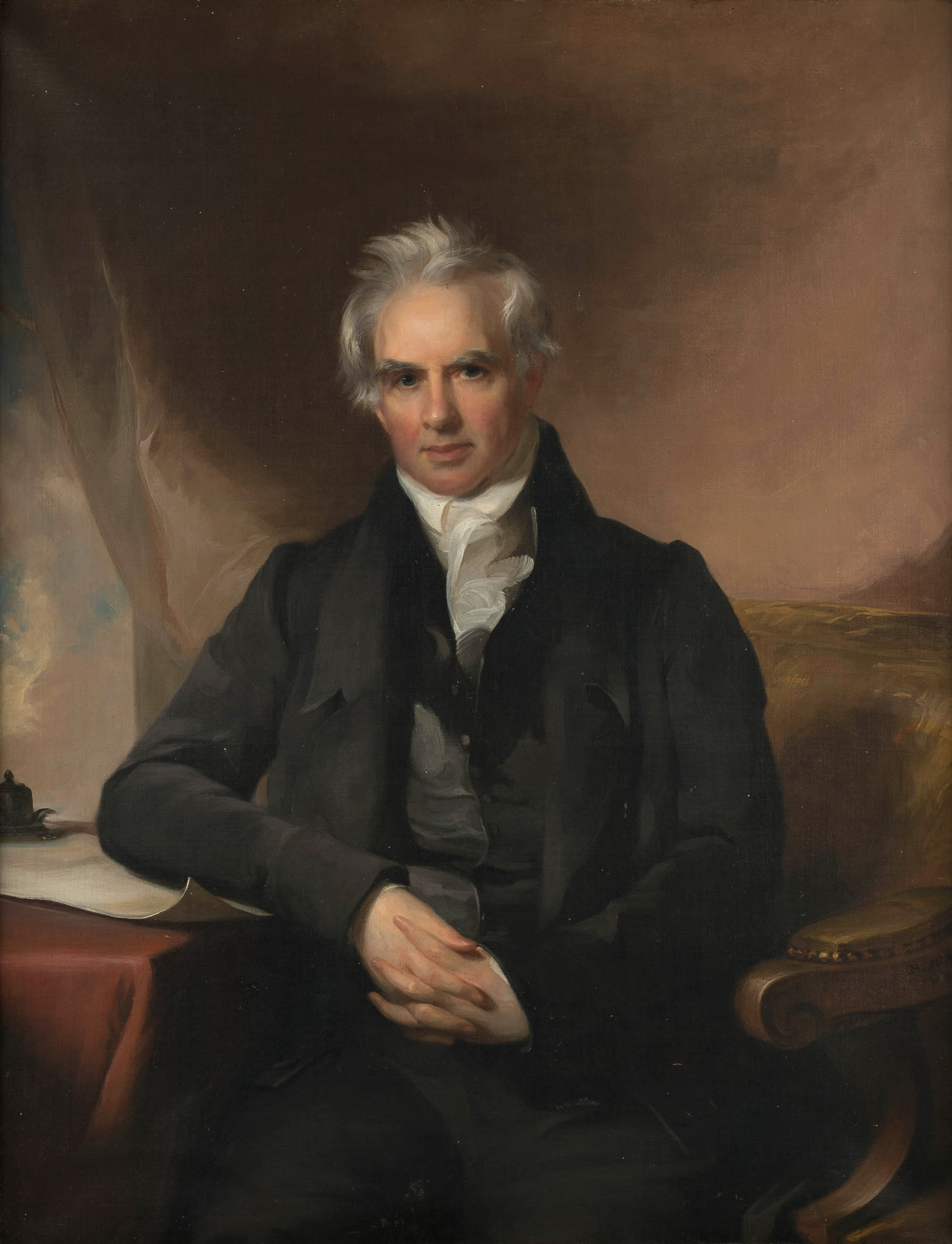
- Portrait by Thomas Sully, c. 1831

13th Lieutenant Governor of Massachusetts
- In office May 26, 1825 – January 9, 1833
- Governor: Levi Lincoln Jr.
- Preceded by: Marcus Morton
- Succeeded by: Samuel Turell Armstrong

Personal details
- Born: Thomas Lindall Winthrop; March 6, 1760 New London, Connecticut Colony, British America
- Died: February 22, 1841 (aged 80) Boston, Massachusetts, U.S.
- Party: Democratic-Republican
- Spouse: Elizabeth Bowdoin Temple (m. 1785; death 1825)
- Children: 6, including Robert
- Education: Harvard University
- Occupation: Politician

Thomas Lindall Winthrop (March 6, 1760 – February 22, 1841) was a Massachusetts politician who served as the 13th lieutenant governor of Massachusetts from 1826 to 1833. He was elected both a Fellow of the American Academy of Arts and Sciences in 1813 and a member of the American Antiquarian Society in 1837.

== Early life and education ==
Winthrop was born in New London, Connecticut. He was a son of John Still Winthrop (1720–1776) and Jane Borland Winthrop (1732–1760) and younger brother of Francis Bayard Winthrop (1754–1817).

Through his paternal grandparents, Ann Dudley (1684–1776) and John Winthrop, F.R.S. (1681–1747), he was a member of the Dudley–Winthrop family, a line that originates with Thomas Dudley—founder of Massachusetts and Winthrop's great-great-grandfather. His paternal great-grandfathers were Joseph Dudley (1647–1720) and Wait Still Winthrop (1641/2–1717).

He entered Yale in 1776 but left and graduated at Harvard in 1780. He was a lawyer and served as Treasurer for the Kennebek Proprietors in the late 18th century.

== Career ==
In 1813, he was elected both a Fellow of the American Academy of Arts and Sciences, and a member of the American Antiquarian Society.

From 1826 to 1833, Winthrop served as the 13th Lieutenant Governor of Massachusetts. He was a member of the Ancient and Honorable Artillery Company of Massachusetts and also served as a state representative and senator.

== Personal life ==
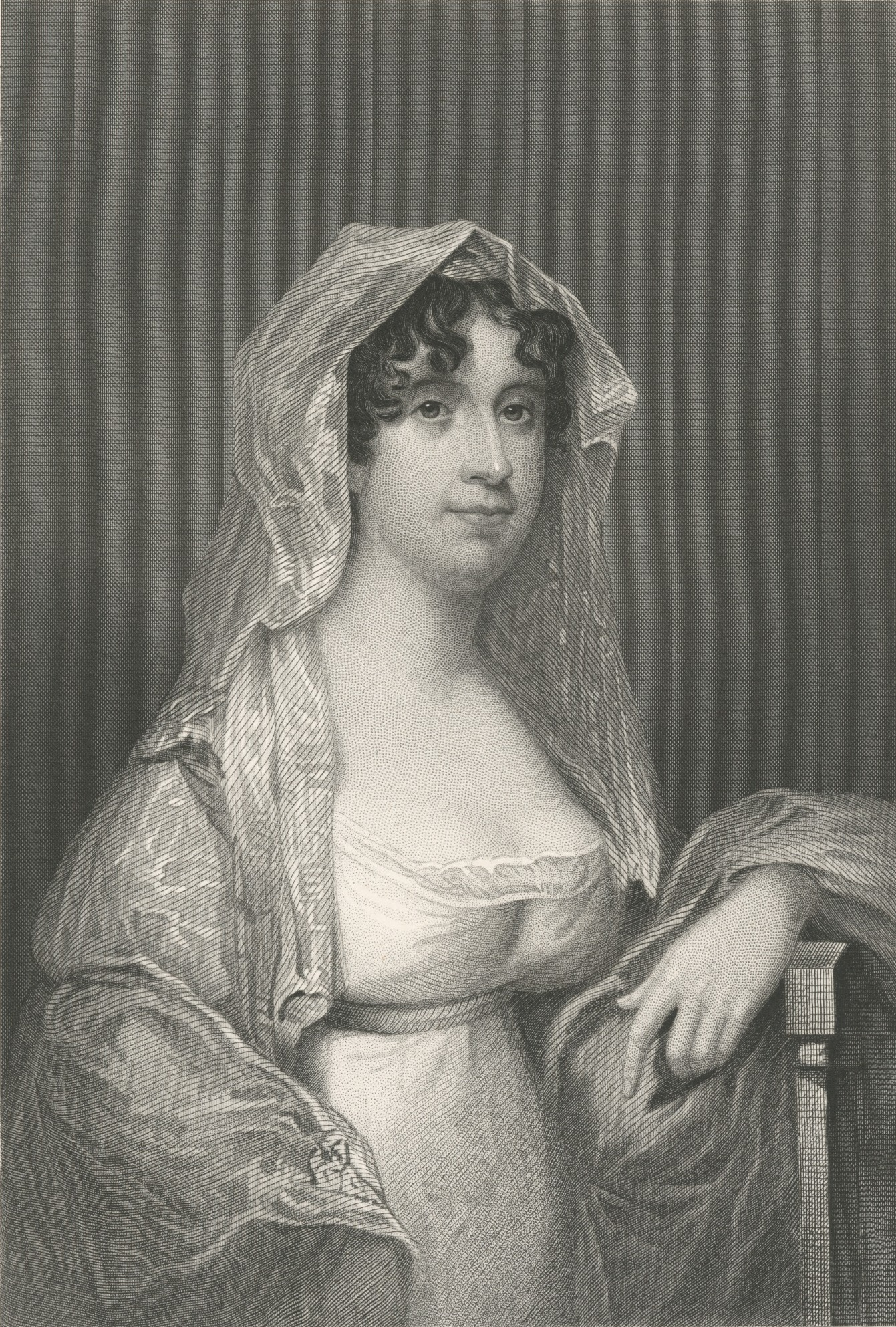
Elizabeth Bowdoin Temple

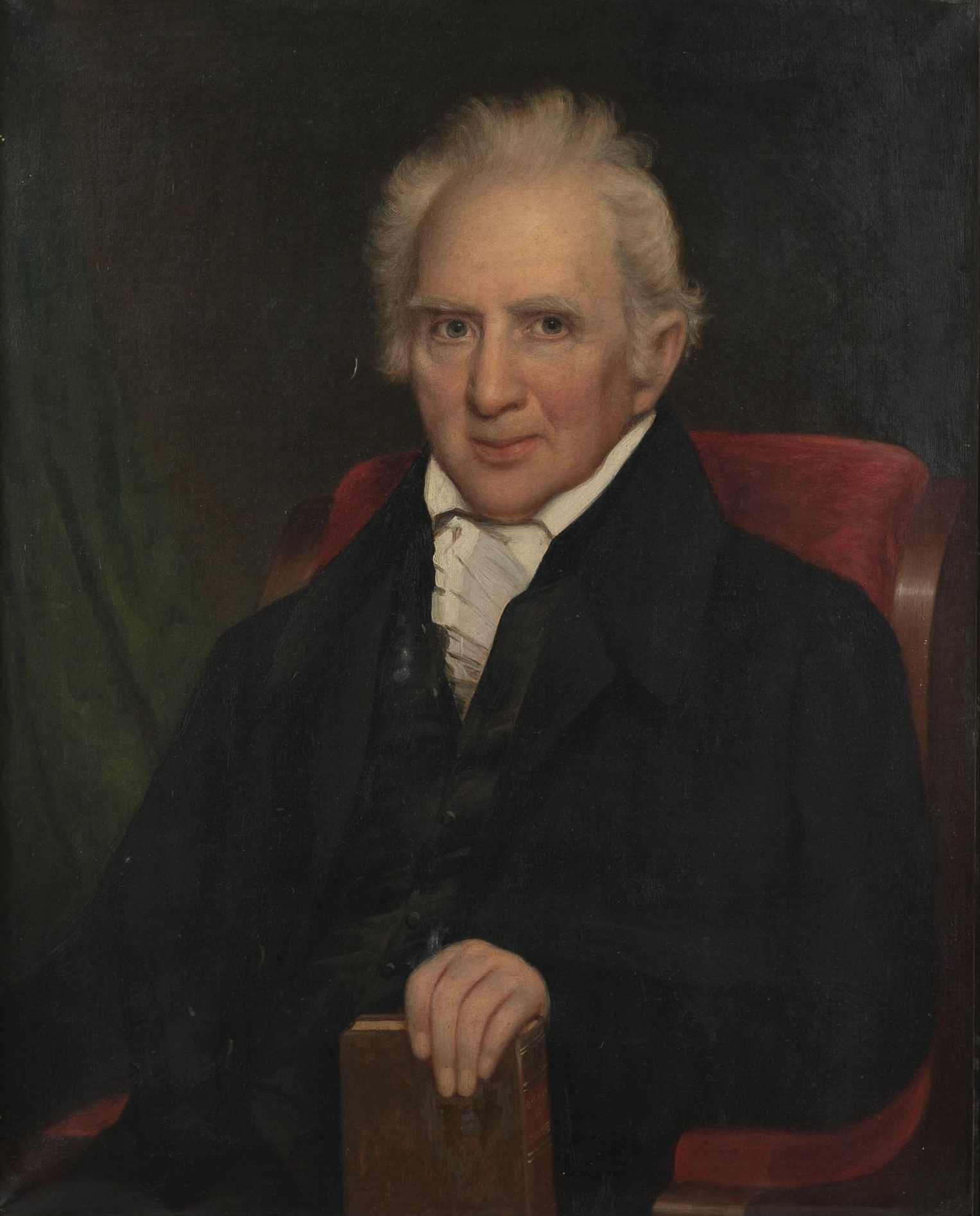
Portrait of Thomas L. Winthrop, by Charles Osgood, c. 1837

In 1785, he married Elizabeth Bowdoin Temple (1769–1825), daughter of Sir John Temple, the first British envoy to the United States. and Elizabeth Bowdoin (1750–1809), daughter of James Bowdoin, who later became Governor of Massachusetts. Together, they were the parents of:

- Elizabeth Bowdoin Temple Winthrop (1787–1860), who married Benjamin Tappan (1788–1863)
- Sarah Bowdoin Winthrop (1788–1864), who married George O'Sullivan (1783–1866), the son of Governor James Sullivan
- Anna Winthrop (died 1850), who married Dr. John Collins Warren (1778–1856) in October 1843.
- George Winthrop (1805–1875)
- Grenville Temple Winthrop (1807–1853), who married Frances Maria Heard
- Robert Charles Winthrop (1809–1894), who served as a U.S. Senator and the Speaker of the U.S. House of Representatives

He died in Boston on February 22, 1841.

=== Descendants ===
Through his son Robert, he was the great-great-great-grandfather of John Kerry, the U.S. Senator and U.S. Secretary of State.

Political offices
Preceded by Marcus Morton	Lieutenant Governor of Massachusetts; 1825–1834	Succeeded by Samuel Turell Armstrong
