= Timeline of the history of the United States (1820–1859) =

This section of the timeline of United States history concerns events from 1820 to 1859.

== 1820s ==
=== Presidency of James Monroe ===
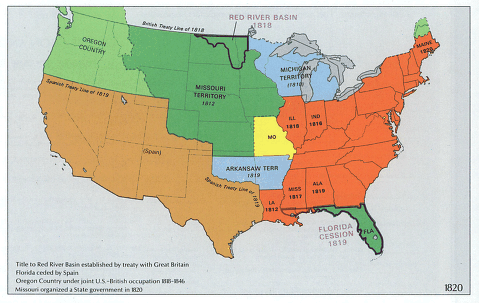
U.S. territorial extent in 1820

- 1820 – Massachusetts divided in two with the admission of Maine as a state.
- 1820 – 1820 United States presidential election: James Monroe reelected president unopposed, Daniel D. Tompkins reelected vice president.
- March 4, 1821 – President Monroe and Vice President Tompkins begin their second terms
- 1821 – Missouri becomes a state
- 1821 – Florida becomes a U.S. territory; the 1819 Adams–Onís Treaty goes into effect
- 1823 – Monroe Doctrine proclaimed
- 1824 – Gibbons v. Ogden (22 US 1 1824) affirms federal over state authority in interstate commerce. Gibbons' business partner is Cornelius Vanderbilt.
- 1824 – 1824 United States presidential election: Presidential results inconclusive. John C. Calhoun elected vice president.
- 1825 – John Quincy Adams elected president by the House of Representatives;

=== Presidency of John Quincy Adams ===
- March 4, 1825 – Adams becomes the sixth president; Calhoun becomes the seventh vice president
- 1825 – Erie Canal is finally completed
- 1826 – Former presidents Thomas Jefferson and John Adams die on the same day, which happens to be on the fiftieth anniversary of the approval of the Declaration of independence.
- 1828 – 1828 United States presidential election: Andrew Jackson elected president; John C. Calhoun reelected vice president
- December 22, 1828 - First Lady-designate Rachel Jackson dies of a heart attack

=== Presidency of Andrew Jackson ===
- March 4, 1829 – Jackson becomes the seventh president; Vice President Calhoun begins second term

== 1830s ==
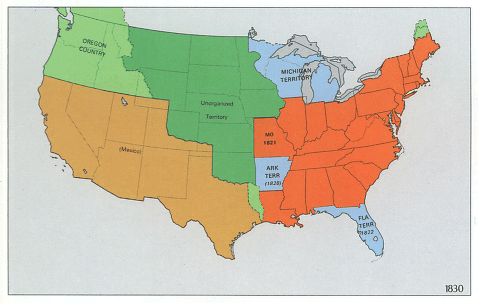
U.S. territorial extent in 1830

- 1830s – Second Great Awakening is the religious revival movement
- 1830s – Oregon Trail which comes into use by settlers migrating to the Pacific Northwest.
- 1830 – Indian Removal Act
- 1831 – Nat Turner's revolt
- 1831 – The Liberator begins publication in 1831
- 1831 – Cyrus McCormick invents the mechanical reaper
- 1831 – Petticoat affair (also known as the Eaton affair)
- 1832 – Worcester v. State of Georgia the Supreme Court rules in favor of Cherokees; President Jackson ignores the ruling.
- 1832 – Maria Stewart is the first black American woman to give a speech in front of a mixed audience.
- 1832 – Black Hawk War
- 1832 – Tariff of 1832
- 1832 – Ordinance of Nullification passed by South Carolina
- 1832 – Department of Indian Affairs established
- 1832 – 1832 United States presidential election: Andrew Jackson reelected president; Martin Van Buren elected vice president.
- 1832 – Jackson vetoes the charter renewal of the Second Bank of the United States, bringing to a head the Bank War and ultimately leading to the Panic of 1837.
- December 28, 1832 – Calhoun resigns as vice president.
- 1833 – The Force Bill expands presidential powers.
- March 4, 1833 – President Jackson begins second term; Van Buren becomes the eighth vice president.
- 1834 – Slavery debates at Lane Theological Seminary are one of the first major public discussions of the topic.
- 1835 – Alexis de Tocqueville's Democracy in America published.
- 1835 – Second Seminole War begins in Florida as members of the Seminole tribe resist relocation.
- 1836 – Creek War of 1836
- 1836 – Samuel Colt invents the revolver.
- 1836 – Original "gag rule" imposed when U.S. House of Representatives bars discussion of antislavery petitions.
- 1836 – Specie Circular issued
- 1836 – Arkansas becomes a state.
- 1836 – 1836 United States presidential election: Martin Van Buren elected president, no one is elected vice president.
- 1837 – Richard Mentor Johnson elected vice president by the Senate.

=== Presidency of Martin Van Buren ===
- March 4, 1837 – Van Buren becomes the eighth president; Johnson becomes the ninth vice president.
- 1837 – U.S. recognizes the Republic of Texas
- 1837 – Caroline affair
- 1837 – Michigan becomes a state
- 1837 – Oberlin College begins enrolling female students, becoming first coeducational college in the U.S.
- 1837 – Panic of 1837
- 1837 – Charles River Bridge v. Warren Bridge reverses Dartmouth College v. Woodward: property rights can be overridden by public eyed.
- 1838 – Forced removal of the Cherokee Nation from the southeastern U.S. leads to over 4,000 deaths in the Trail of Tears.
- 1838 – Aroostook War
- 1839 – Amistad case

== 1840s ==
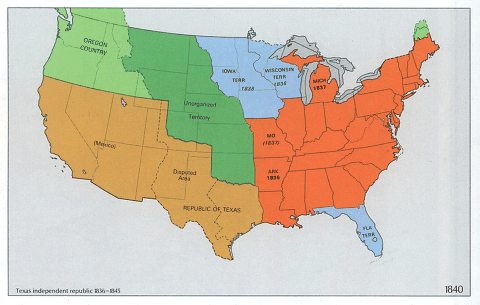
U.S. territorial extent in 1840

- 1840 – 1840 United States presidential election: William Henry Harrison is elected president; John Tyler is elected vice president.
- 1841 – John Quincy Adams argues the Amistad Case before the Supreme Court.

=== Presidency of William Henry Harrison ===
- March 4, 1841 – Harrison becomes the ninth president; Tyler becomes the tenth vice president.
- March 6, 1841 – Supreme Court finds for Amistad defendants, freeing them.
- April 4, 1841 – President Harrison dies after only a month in office.

=== Presidency of John Tyler ===
- April 4, 1841 – Vice President Tyler becomes the tenth president
- September 11, 1841 – Tyler's cabinet resigns en masse. Only Daniel Webster remains.
- 1842 – Webster–Ashburton Treaty
- 1842 – The Dorr Rebellion: A civil war in Rhode Island
- July 10, 1842 - January, 1843 – Attempted impeachment of President Tyler.
- 1843 – Emigrants begin their journey along the Oregon Trail.
- December, 1844 – Oregon passes its Black Exclusion Law.
- June 27, 1844 – Mormon leader, Joseph Smith Jr. assassinated.
- 1844 – 1844 United States presidential election, James K. Polk is elected president; George M. Dallas is elected vice president.
- 1845 – Texas annexation

=== Presidency of James K. Polk ===
- March 4, 1845 – Polk becomes the 11th president; Dallas becomes the 11th vice president.
- 1845 – Florida and Texas become states
- 1846 – Dred Scott sues for his freedom
- 1846 – The Mexican–American War begins
- 1846 – Bear Flag revolt in Alta California, which is momentarily independent.
- 1846 – Iowa becomes a state
- 1846 – Wilmot Proviso
- 1846 – The United States and Great Britain sign the Oregon Treaty
- 1847 – Abraham Lincoln introduces himself to the world by his introduction of the Spot Resolutions in the House.
- 1847 – Battle of Buena Vista
- 1847 – Battle of Veracruz
- 1848 – The Treaty of Guadalupe Hidalgo ends the Mexican–American War
- 1848 – Wisconsin becomes a state
- 1848 – Seneca Falls Convention
- 1848 – 1848 United States presidential election; Zachary Taylor is elected president; Millard Fillmore is elected vice president

=== Presidency of Zachary Taylor ===
- March 4, 1849 – Taylor becomes the 12th president; Fillmore becomes the 12th vice president
- 1849 – California Gold Rush begins

== 1850s ==
- 1850 – Clayton–Bulwer Treaty
- 1850 – President Taylor threatens to veto Compromise of 1850 even if it means Civil War.
- June 3–11 –The secessionist Nashville Convention held in Nashville, Tennessee.

=== Presidency of Millard Fillmore ===
- July 9, 1850 – President Taylor dies, Vice President Fillmore becomes the 13th president
- September 9–20, 1850 – The Compromise of 1850, including the notorious Fugitive Slave Act passed
- September 9, 1850 – California becomes a state
- November 1850 – Nashville Convention reconvenes; Satisfied with the Compromise, it declares the Union intact-for the moment.
- 1852 – 1852 United States presidential election: Franklin Pierce elected president; William R. King elected vice president
- 1853 – Commodore Matthew Perry opens Japan

=== Presidency of Franklin Pierce ===
- March 4, 1853 – Pierce becomes the 14th president; King becomes the 13th vice president
- April 18, 1853 – Vice President King dies after only six weeks in office.
- 1854 – Gadsden Purchase from Mexico
- 1854 – Kansas–Nebraska Act; nullified Missouri Compromise
- 1854 – Ostend Manifesto
- 1854 – Whig Party collapses and Republican Party forms
- 1854 – Treaty of Kanagawa with Japan
- 1854 – Walker Expedition into Nicaragua
- 1854-1855 Know-Nothing Party, mushroom growth and sudden collapse
- 1855 – The Farmers' High School, which becomes Penn State University is founded.
- 1856 – Sack of Lawrence, Kansas
- 1856 – Pottawatomie massacre
- 1856 – Preston Brooks beats Charles Sumner with his walking stick on the steps of the U.S. Capitol building
- 1856 – 1856 United States presidential election: James Buchanan elected president; John C. Breckinridge, vice president

=== Presidency of James Buchanan ===
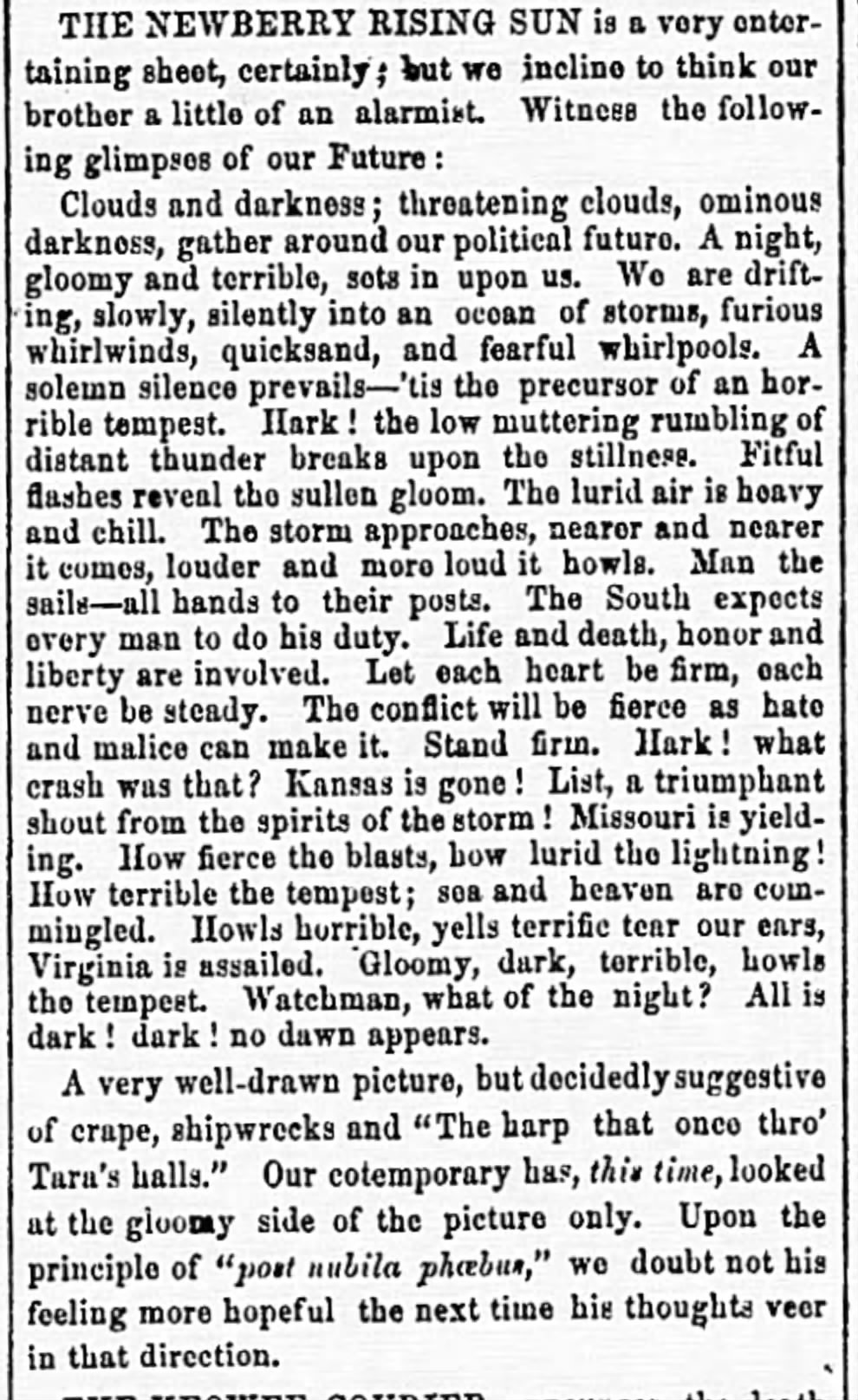
A writer at the Newberry Rising Sun of South Carolina aptly characterizes the forthcoming American Civil War from four years' distance

- March 4, 1857 – Buchanan becomes the 15th president; Breckinridge becomes the 14th vice president
- 1857 – Dred Scott v. Sandford 60 US 393 1857 declares that slaves and Blacks descended from slaves were not American citizens and cannot sue
- 1857 – Utah War
- 1857 – Lecompton Constitution rejected in Kansas Territory
- 1857 – Panic of 1857
- 1857 – San Francisco Board of Education established Minns Evening Normal School for current and prospective teachers, which becomes San Jose State University
- 1858 – Transatlantic cable laid
- 1858 – Minnesota becomes a state
- 1858 – Lincoln–Douglas debates
- 1858 – U.S. is party to Treaty of Tientsin
- 1859 – John Brown's raid on Harpers Ferry
- 1859 – Comstock Lode discovered

== See also ==
- History of the United States (1789–1815)
- History of the United States (1815–1849)
- History of the United States (1849–1865)
- Timeline of the American Old West
