= List of United States representatives in the 23rd Congress =

This is a complete list of United States representatives during the 23rd United States Congress listed by seniority.

As an historical article, the districts and party affiliations listed reflect those during the 23rd Congress (March 4, 1833 – March 3, 1835). Seats and party affiliations on similar lists for other congresses will be different for certain members.

Seniority depends on the date on which members were sworn into office. Since many members are sworn in on the same day, subsequent ranking is based on previous congressional service of the individual and then by alphabetical order by the last name of the representative.

Committee chairmanship in the House is often associated with seniority. However, party leadership is typically not associated with seniority.

Note: The "*" indicates that the representative/delegate may have served one or more non-consecutive terms while in the House of Representatives of the United States Congress.

== U.S. House seniority list ==
U.S. House seniority
Rank	Representative	Party	District	Seniority date (Previous service, if any)	No.# of term(s)	Notes
1	Lewis Williams	AJ	NC-13	March 4, 1815	10th term	Dean of the House
2	Charles F. Mercer	AJ	VA-14	March 4, 1817	9th term	
3	William S. Archer	J	VA-03	January 3, 1820	8th term	Left the House in 1835.
4	Noyes Barber	AJ	CT	March 4, 1821	7th term	Left the House in 1835.
5	Henry William Connor	J	NC-11	March 4, 1821	7th term	
6	George McDuffie	N	SC-05	March 4, 1821	7th term	Resigned sometime in 1834.
7	John Reed Jr.	AM	MA-11	March 4, 1821; Previous service, 1813–1817.	9th term*	
8	Andrew Stevenson	J	VA-11	March 4, 1821	7th term	Speaker of the House; Resigned on June 2, 1834.
9	Joseph Vance	J	OH-10	March 4, 1821	7th term	Left the House in 1835.
10	Churchill C. Cambreleng	J	NY-03	December 3, 1821	7th term	
11	John Blair	J	TN-01	March 4, 1823	6th term	Left the House in 1835.
12	Elisha Whittlesey	AJ	OH-16	March 4, 1823	6th term	
13	Samuel Finley Vinton	AJ	OH-06	March 4, 1823	6th term	
14	Tristam Burges	AJ	RI	March 4, 1825	5th term	Left the House in 1835.
15	Nathaniel Claiborne	J	VA-07	March 4, 1825	5th term	
16	John Davis	AJ	MA-05	March 4, 1825	5th term	Resigned on January 14, 1834.
17	Thomas Davenport	AJ	VA-06	March 4, 1825	5th term	Left the House in 1835.
18	Edward Everett	AJ	MA-04	March 4, 1825	5th term	
19	Dutee Jerauld Pearce	AM	RI	March 4, 1825	5th term	
20	James K. Polk	J	TN-09	March 4, 1825	5th term	
21	Daniel Laurens Barringer	AJ	NC-08	December 4, 1826	5th term	Left the House in 1835.
22	Isaac C. Bates	AJ	MA-08	March 4, 1827	4th term	Left the House in 1835.
23	John Bell	J	TN-07	March 4, 1827	4th term	Became Speaker of the House after Stevenson resigned. Left the House in 1835.
24	Richard Coulter	J	PA-19	March 4, 1827	4th term	Left the House in 1835.
25	Warren R. Davis	N	SC-06	March 4, 1827	4th term	Died on January 29, 1835.
26	Joseph Duncan	J	IL-03	March 4, 1827	4th term	Resigned on September 21, 1834.
27	Thomas H. Hall	J	NC-03	March 4, 1827; Previous service, 1817–1825.	8th term*	Left the House in 1835.
28	Chittenden Lyon	J	KY-01	March 4, 1827	4th term	Left the House in 1835.
29	Augustine Henry Shepperd	AJ	NC-09	March 4, 1827	4th term	
30	Rufus McIntire	J	ME-01	September 10, 1827	4th term	
31	Richard Henry Wilde	J	GA	November 17, 1827; Previous service, 1815–1817 and 1825.	6th term**	Left the House in 1835.
32	James Blair	N	SC-08	March 4, 1829; Previous service, 1821–1822.	4th term*	Died on April 1, 1834.
33	Ratliff Boon	J	IN-01	March 4, 1829; Previous service, 1825–1827.	4th term*	
34	Clement Comer Clay	J	AL-01	March 4, 1829	3rd term	Left the House in 1835.
35	Joseph Halsey Crane	AJ	OH-03	March 4, 1829	3rd term	
36	William W. Ellsworth	AJ	CT	March 4, 1829	3rd term	Resigned on July 8, 1834.
37	Horace Everett	AJ	VT-03	March 4, 1829	3rd term	
38	Thomas Flournoy Foster	J	GA	March 4, 1829	3rd term	Left the House in 1835.
39	George Grennell Jr.	AJ	MA-06	March 4, 1829	3rd term	
40	Henry Hubbard	J	NH	March 4, 1829	3rd term	Left the House in 1835.
41	Jabez W. Huntington	AJ	CT	March 4, 1829	3rd term	Resigned on August 16, 1834.
42	Leonard Jarvis	J	ME-06	March 4, 1829	3rd term	
43	Cave Johnson	J	TN-11	March 4, 1829	3rd term	
44	Richard Mentor Johnson	J	KY-13	March 4, 1829; Previous service, 1807–1819.	7th term*	
45	Dixon H. Lewis	J	AL-04	March 4, 1829	3rd term	
46	Henry A. P. Muhlenberg	J	PA-09	March 4, 1829	3rd term	
47	Abraham Rencher	AJ	NC-10	March 4, 1829	3rd term	
48	William Biddle Shepard	AJ	NC-01	March 4, 1829	3rd term	
49	Jesse Speight	J	NC-04	March 4, 1829	3rd term	
50	James Israel Standifer	J	TN-04	March 4, 1829; Previous service, 1823–1825.	4th term*	
51	John Thomson	J	OH-17	March 4, 1829; Previous service, 1825–1827.	4th term*	
52	James Moore Wayne	J	GA	March 4, 1829	3rd term	Resigned on January 13, 1835.
53	Campbell P. White	J	NY-03	March 4, 1829	3rd term	
54	Edward Douglass White, Sr.	AJ	LA-01	March 4, 1829	3rd term	Resigned on November 15, 1834.
55	Ebenezer Young	AJ	CT	March 4, 1829	3rd term	Left the House in 1835.
56	George Evans	AJ	ME-04	July 20, 1829	3rd term	
57	Harmar Denny	AM	PA-22	December 15, 1829	4th term	Left the House in 1837.
58	William F. Gordon	J	VA-12	January 25, 1830	3rd term	Left the House in 1835.
59	John M. Patton	D	VA-13	November 25, 1830	3rd term	
60	Humphrey H. Leavitt	J	OH-19	December 6, 1830	3rd term	Resigned on July 10, 1834.
61	John Quincy Adams	AM	MA-12	March 4, 1831	2nd term	
62	Chilton Allan	AJ	KY-10	March 4, 1831	2nd term	
63	Heman Allen	AJ	VT-04	March 4, 1831	2nd term	
64	John Banks	AM	PA-24	March 4, 1831	2nd term	
65	Samuel Beardsley	J	NY-17	March 4, 1831	2nd term	
66	George N. Briggs	AJ	MA-07	March 4, 1831	2nd term	
67	Henry Adams Bullard	AJ	LA-03	March 4, 1831	2nd term	Resigned on January 4, 1834.
68	George Burd	AJ	PA-18	March 4, 1831	2nd term	Left the House in 1835.
69	John Carr	J	IN-03	March 4, 1831	2nd term	
70	Joseph Chinn	J	VA-10	March 4, 1831	2nd term	Left the House in 1835.
71	Rufus Choate	AJ	MA-02	March 4, 1831	2nd term	Resigned on June 30, 1834.
72	Thomas Corwin	AJ	OH-04	March 4, 1831	2nd term	
73	John Dickson	AM	NY-26	March 4, 1831	2nd term	Left the House in 1835.
74	John Myers Felder	N	SC-04	March 4, 1831	2nd term	Left the House in 1835.
75	John K. Griffin	N	SC-09	March 4, 1831	2nd term	
76	Edward Kavanagh	J	ME-03	March 4, 1831	2nd term	Left the House in 1835.
77	Joseph M. Harper	J	NH	March 4, 1831	2nd term	Left the House in 1835.
78	Albert Gallatin Hawes	J	KY-02	March 4, 1831	2nd term	
79	William Hiester	AM	PA-04	March 4, 1831	2nd term	
80	Henry King	J	PA-08	March 4, 1831	2nd term	Left the House in 1835.
81	Gerrit Y. Lansing	J	NY-10	March 4, 1831	2nd term	
82	Joel Keith Mann	J	PA-05	March 4, 1831	2nd term	Left the House in 1835.
83	Samuel Wright Mardis	J	AL-03	March 4, 1831	2nd term	Left the House in 1835.
84	Thomas Alexander Marshall	AJ	KY-12	March 4, 1831	2nd term	Left the House in 1835.
85	John Y. Mason	J	VA-02	March 4, 1831	2nd term	
86	Johnathan McCarty	J	IN-05	March 4, 1831	2nd term	
87	James Iver McKay	J	NC-05	March 4, 1831	2nd term	
88	Thomas McKean Thompson McKennan	AM	PA-21	March 4, 1831	2nd term	
89	John J. Milligan	AJ	DE	March 4, 1831	2nd term	
90	Job Pierson	J	NY-09	March 4, 1831	2nd term	Left the House in 1835.
91	Franklin E. Plummer	J	MS	March 4, 1831	2nd term	Left the House in 1835.
92	David Potts Jr.	AM	PA-04	March 4, 1831	2nd term	
93	Andrew Stewart	AM	PA-20	March 4, 1831; Previous service, 1821–1829.	6th term*	Left the House in 1835.
94	Francis Thomas	J	MD-07	March 4, 1831	2nd term	
95	Philemon Thomas	J	LA-02	March 4, 1831	2nd term	Left the House in 1835.
96	Aaron Ward	J	NY-04	March 4, 1831; Previous service, 1825–1829.	4th term*	
97	Daniel Wardwell	J	NY-18	March 4, 1831	2nd term	
98	John Goddard Watmough	AJ	PA-03	March 4, 1831	2nd term	Left the House in 1835.
99	William Henry Ashley	AJ	MO	October 31, 1831	2nd term	
100	William Slade	AM	VT-02	November 1, 1831	2nd term	
101	Micajah Thomas Hawkins	J	NC-06	December 15, 1831	2nd term	
102	Augustin Smith Clayton	J	GA	January 21, 1832	2nd term	Left the House in 1835.
103	Hiland Hall	AJ	VT-01	January 1, 1833	2nd term	
104	John Adams	J	NY-08	March 4, 1833	1st term	Left the House in 1835.
105	William Allen	J	OH-07	March 4, 1833	1st term	Left the House in 1835.
106	Joseph Biles Anthony	J	PA-16	March 4, 1833	1st term	
107	Charles Augustus Barnitz	AM	PA-11	March 4, 1833	1st term	Left the House in 1835.
108	William Baylies	AJ	MA-10	March 4, 1833; Previous service, 1809 and 1813–1817.	4th term**	Left the House in 1835.
109	Benning M. Bean	J	NH	March 4, 1833	1st term	
110	Martin Beaty	AJ	KY-04	March 4, 1833	1st term	Left the House in 1835.
111	Andrew Beaumont	J	PA-15	March 4, 1833	1st term	
112	James M. H. Beale	J	VA-16	March 4, 1833	1st term	
113	James Martin Bell	AJ	OH-11	March 4, 1833	1st term	Left the House in 1835.
114	Horace Binney	AJ	PA-02	March 4, 1833	1st term	Left the House in 1835.
115	Abraham Bockee	J	NY-05	March 4, 1833; Previous service, 1829–1831.	2nd term*	
116	Charles Bodle	J	NY-07	March 4, 1833	1st term	Left the House in 1835.
117	John W. Brown	J	NY-06	March 4, 1833	1st term	
118	John Bull	AJ	MO	March 4, 1833	1st term	Left the House in 1835.
119	Samuel Bunch	J	TN-02	March 4, 1833	1st term	
120	Robert Burns	J	NH	March 4, 1833	1st term	
121	Jesse Atherton Bynum	J	NC-02	March 4, 1833	1st term	
122	Zadok Casey	J	IL-02	March 4, 1833	1st term	
123	Harry Cage	J	MS	March 4, 1833	1st term	Left the House in 1835.
124	Richard Bennett Carmichael	J	MD-02	March 4, 1833	1st term	Left the House in 1835.
125	George Chambers	AM	PA-12	March 4, 1833	1st term	
126	John Chaney	J	OH-09	March 4, 1833	1st term	
127	Thomas Chilton	AJ	KY-06	March 4, 1833; Previous service, 1827–1831.	3rd term*	Left the House in 1835.
128	Samuel Clark	J	NY-25	March 4, 1833	1st term	Left the House in 1835.
129	William Clark	AM	PA-10	March 4, 1833	1st term	
130	William K. Clowney	N	SC-07	March 4, 1833	1st term	Left the House in 1835.
131	John E. Coffee	J	GA	March 4, 1833	1st term	
132	John Cramer	J	NY-11	March 4, 1833	1st term	
133	Davy Crockett	AJ	TN-12	March 4, 1833; Previous service, 1827–1831.	3rd term*	Left the House in 1835.
134	Edward Darlington	AM	PA-04	March 4, 1833	1st term	
135	Amos Davis	AJ	KY-11	March 4, 1833	1st term	Left the House in 1835.
136	Rowland Day	J	NY-24	March 4, 1833; Previous service, 1823–1825.	2nd term*	Left the House in 1835.
137	Edmund Deberry	AJ	NC-07	March 4, 1833; Previous service, 1829–1831.	2nd term*	
138	Benjamin F. Deming	AM	VT-05	March 4, 1833	1st term	Died on July 11, 1834.
139	Littleton Purnell Dennis	AJ	MD-01	March 4, 1833	1st term	Died on April 14, 1834.
140	Philemon Dickerson	J	NJ	March 4, 1833	1st term	
141	David W. Dickinson	J	TN-08	March 4, 1833	1st term	Left the House in 1835.
142	William Claiborne Dunlap	J	TN-13	March 4, 1833	1st term	
143	John Ewing	AJ	IN-02	March 4, 1833	1st term	Left the House in 1835.
144	Millard Fillmore	AM	NY-32	March 4, 1833	1st term	Left the House in 1835.
145	Samuel A. Foot	AJ	CT	March 4, 1833; Previous service, 1819–1821 and 1823–1825.	3rd term**	Resigned on May 9, 1834.
146	John B. Forester	J	TN-05	March 4, 1833	1st term	
147	Samuel Fowler	J	NJ	March 4, 1833	1st term	
148	Philo C. Fuller	AM	NY-30	March 4, 1833	1st term	
149	William K. Fuller	J	NY-23	March 4, 1833	1st term	
150	John H. Fulton	J	VA-18	March 4, 1833	1st term	Left the House in 1835.
151	John Galbraith	J	PA-25	March 4, 1833	1st term	
152	Roger Lawson Gamble	J	GA	March 4, 1833	1st term	Left the House in 1835.
153	James Gholson	AJ	VA-04	March 4, 1833	1st term	Left the House in 1835.
154	Ransom H. Gillet	J	NY-14	March 4, 1833	1st term	
155	George Rockingham Gilmer	J	GA	March 4, 1833; Previous service, 1821–1823 and 1827–1829.	3rd term**	Left the House in 1835.
156	Benjamin Gorham	J	MA-01	March 4, 1833; Previous service, 1820–1823 and 1827–1831.	5th term**	Left the House in 1835.
157	James Graham	AJ	NC-12	March 4, 1833	1st term	
158	William J. Grayson	N	SC-02	March 4, 1833	1st term	
159	Joseph Hall	J	ME-07	March 4, 1833	1st term	
160	Nicoll Halsey	J	NY-22	March 4, 1833	1st term	Left the House in 1835.
161	Thomas L. Hamer	J	OH-05	March 4, 1833	1st term	
162	Edward A. Hannegan	AJ	IN-07	March 4, 1833	1st term	
163	Benjamin Hardin	AJ	KY-07	March 4, 1833; Previous service, 1815–1817 and 1819–1823.	4th term**	
164	Gideon Hard	AM	NY-33	March 4, 1833	1st term	
165	James Harper	AJ	PA-02	March 4, 1833	1st term	
166	Samuel Smith Harrison	J	PA-23	March 4, 1833	1st term	
167	Samuel G. Hathaway	J	NY-22	March 4, 1833	1st term	Left the House in 1835.
168	Abner Hazeltine	AM	NY-31	March 4, 1833	1st term	
169	James P. Heath	J	MD-04	March 4, 1833	1st term	Left the House in 1835.
170	Joseph Henderson	J	PA-14	March 4, 1833	1st term	
171	Edward Howell	AM	NY-27	March 4, 1833	1st term	Left the House in 1835.
172	Abel Huntington	J	NY-01	March 4, 1833	1st term	
173	William Marshall Inge	J	TN-10	March 4, 1833	1st term	Left the House in 1835.
174	William Jackson	AM	MA-09	March 4, 1833	1st term	
175	Noadiah Johnson	J	NY-20	March 4, 1833	1st term	Left the House in 1835.
176	William Cost Johnson	AJ	MD-06	March 4, 1833	1st term	Left the House in 1835.
177	Benjamin Jones	J	OH-18	March 4, 1833	1st term	
178	Seaborn Jones	J	GA	March 4, 1833	1st term	Left the House in 1835.
179	George L. Kinnard	J	IN-06	March 4, 1833	1st term	
180	Amos Lane	J	IN-04	March 4, 1833	1st term	
181	John Laporte	J	PA-17	March 4, 1833	1st term	
182	Cornelius Lawrence	J	NY-03	March 4, 1833	1st term	Resigned on May 14, 1834.
183	George W. Lay	AM	NY-29	March 4, 1833	1st term	
184	Luke Lea	J	TN-03	March 4, 1833	1st term	
185	Thomas Lee	J	NJ	March 4, 1833	1st term	
186	James Love	AJ	KY-09	March 4, 1833	1st term	Left the House in 1835.
187	George Loyall	J	VA-01	March 4, 1833; Previous service, 1830–1831.	2nd term*	
188	Edward Lucas	J	VA-15	March 4, 1833	1st term	
189	Robert Todd Lytle	J	OH-01	March 4, 1833	1st term	Resigned on March 10, 1834. Returned to the House on December 27, 1834. Left the House in 1835.
190	Abijah Mann Jr.	J	NY-16	March 4, 1833	1st term	
191	Henry C. Martindale	J	NY-12	March 4, 1833; Previous service, 1823–1831.	5th term*	Left the House in 1835.
192	Moses Mason Jr.	J	ME-05	March 4, 1833	1st term	
193	William McComas	J	VA-19	March 4, 1833	1st term	
194	Isaac McKim	J	MD-05	March 4, 1833; Previous service, 1823–1825.	3rd term*	
195	John McKinley	J	AL-02	March 4, 1833	1st term	Left the House in 1835.
196	Jeremiah McLene	J	OH-08	March 4, 1833	1st term	
197	Charles McVean	J	NY-15	March 4, 1833	1st term	Left the House in 1835.
198	Jesse Miller	J	PA-13	March 4, 1833	1st term	
199	Henry Mitchell	J	NY-21	March 4, 1833	1st term	Left the House in 1835.
200	Samuel M. Moore	AJ	VA-17	March 4, 1833	1st term	Left the House in 1835.
201	Robert Mitchell	J	OH-12	March 4, 1833	1st term	Left the House in 1835.
202	John Murphy	J	AL-05	March 4, 1833	1st term	Left the House in 1835.
203	Gayton P. Osgood	J	MA-03	March 4, 1833	1st term	Left the House in 1835.
204	Sherman Page	J	NY-19	March 4, 1833	1st term	
205	James Parker	J	NJ	March 4, 1833	1st term	
206	Gorham Parks	J	ME-08	March 4, 1833	1st term	
207	William Patterson	J	OH-14	March 4, 1833	1st term	
208	Balie Peyton	J	TN-06	March 4, 1833	1st term	
209	Henry L. Pinckney	N	SC-01	March 4, 1833	1st term	
210	Franklin Pierce	J	NH	March 4, 1833	1st term	
211	Patrick H. Pope	J	KY-08	March 4, 1833	1st term	Left the House in 1835.
212	Robert Ramsey	J	PA-06	March 4, 1833	1st term	Left the House in 1835.
213	John Randolph of Roanoke	J	VA-05	March 4, 1833; Previous service, 1799–1813, 1815–1817, 1819–1825 and 1827–1829.	14th term****	Died on May 24, 1833.
214	Ferdinand Schureman Schenck	J	NJ	March 4, 1833	1st term	
215	William Schley	J	GA	March 4, 1833	1st term	
216	Dudley Selden	J	NY-03	March 4, 1833	1st term	Resigned on July 1, 1834.
217	William Norton Shinn	J	NJ	March 4, 1833	1st term	
218	Thomas D. Singleton	N	SC-03	March 4, 1833	1st term	Died on November 25, 1833.
219	Charles Slade	J	IL-01	March 4, 1833	1st term	Died on July 26, 1834.
220	Jonathan Sloane	AM	OH-15	March 4, 1833	1st term	
221	Francis Ormand Jonathan Smith	J	ME-02	March 4, 1833	1st term	
222	David Spangler	AJ	OH-13	March 4, 1833	1st term	
223	John Truman Stoddert	J	MD-08	March 4, 1833	1st term	Left the House in 1835.
224	William P. Taylor	AJ	VA-09	March 4, 1833	1st term	Left the House in 1835.
225	William Taylor	J	NY-23	March 4, 1833	1st term	Left the House in 1835.
226	Samuel Tweedy	AJ	CT	March 4, 1833	1st term	Left the House in 1835.
227	Christopher Tompkins	AJ	KY-03	March 4, 1833	1st term	Left the House in 1835.
228	James Turner	J	MD-03	March 4, 1833	1st term	
229	Joel Turrill	J	NY-17	March 4, 1833	1st term	
230	Aaron Vanderpoel	J	NY-08	March 4, 1833	1st term	
231	Isaac B. Van Houten	J	NY-02	March 4, 1833	1st term	Left the House in 1835.
232	David Douglas Wagener	J	PA-07	March 4, 1833	1st term	
233	Taylor Webster	J	OH-02	March 4, 1833	1st term	
234	Reuben Whallon	J	NY-13	March 4, 1833	1st term	Left the House in 1835.
235	Frederick Whittlesey	AM	NY-28	March 4, 1833	1st term	Left the House in 1835.
236	Edgar C. Wilson	AJ	VA-21	March 4, 1833	1st term	Left the House in 1835.
237	Henry A. Wise	J	VA-08	March 4, 1833	1st term	
	Thomas Bouldin	J	VA-05	August 26, 1833; Previous service, 1829–1833.	3rd term*	Died on February 11, 1834.
	Joel Barlow Sutherland	J	PA-01	October 8, 1833; Previous service, 1827–1833.	4th term*	
	John J. Allen	AJ	VA-20	December 2, 1833	1st term	Left the House in 1835.
	Levi Lincoln Jr.	AJ	MA-05	February 17, 1834	1st term	
	Robert B. Campbell	N	SC-03	February 27, 1834; Previous service, 1823–1825.	2nd term*	
	James Bouldin	J	VA-05	March 15, 1834	1st term	
	Rice Garland	AJ	LA-03	April 28, 1834	1st term	
	John Nevett Steele	AJ	MD-01	May 29, 1834	1st term	
	Robert P. Letcher	AJ	KY-05	August 6, 1834; Previous service, 1823–1833.	6th term*	Left the House in 1835.
	Charles G. Ferris	J	NY-03	December 1, 1834	1st term	Left the House in 1835.
	Ebenezer Jackson Jr.	AJ	CT	December 1, 1834	1st term	Left the House in 1835.
	Henry Johnson	AJ	LA-01	December 1, 1834	1st term	
	Daniel Kilgore	J	OH-19	December 1, 1834	1st term	
	William L. May	J	IL-03	December 1, 1834	1st term	
	Phineas Miner	AJ	CT	December 1, 1834	1st term	Left the House in 1835.
	John J. Morgan	J	NY-03	December 1, 1834; Previous service, 1821–1825.	3rd term*	Left the House in 1835.
	Stephen C. Phillips	AJ	MA-02	December 1, 1834	1st term	
	John Reynolds	J	IL-01	December 1, 1834	1st term	
	John Robertson	AJ	VA-11	December 1, 1834	1st term	
	Joseph Trumbull	AJ	CT	December 1, 1834	1st term	Left the House in 1835.
	Henry Fisk Janes	AM	VT-05	December 2, 1834	1st term	
	Richard Irvine Manning I	J	SC-08	December 8, 1834	1st term	
	Francis Wilkinson Pickens	N	SC-05	December 8, 1834	1st term	

== Delegates ==
Rank	Delegate	Party	District	Seniority date (Previous service, if any)	No.# of term(s)	Notes
1	Joseph M. White	J	FL	March 4, 1825	5th term	
2	Ambrose Hundley Sevier	J	AR	February 13, 1828	4th term	
3	Lucius Lyon	J	MI	March 4, 1833	1st term	

== See also ==
- 23rd United States Congress
- List of United States congressional districts
- List of United States senators in the 23rd Congress
