= 1837 Maine gubernatorial election =

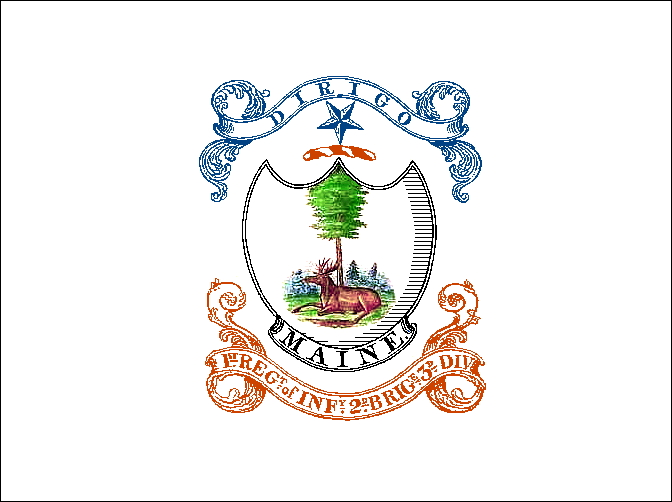
- September 11, 1837
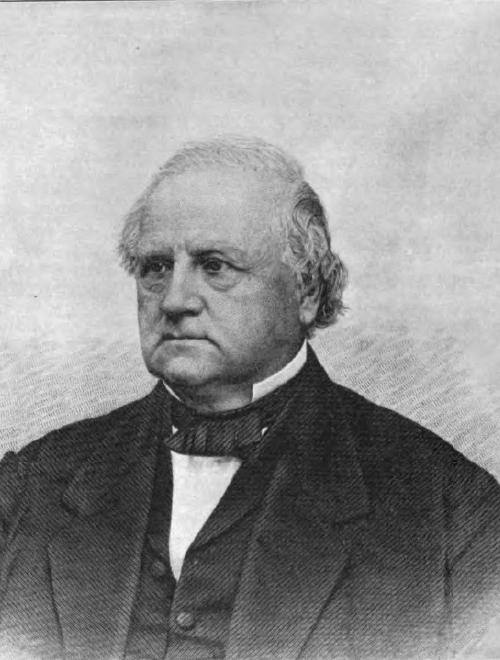

Nominee	Edward Kent	Gorham Parks
Party	Whig	Democratic
Popular vote	34,358	33,879
Percentage	50.14%	49.44%
- County results Kent: 50–60% 60–70% Parks: 50–60% 60–70%
Governor before election
Robert P. Dunlap
Democratic
Elected Governor
Edward Kent
Whig

The 1837 Maine gubernatorial election took place on September 11, 1837. Incumbent Democratic Governor Robert P. Dunlap did not run for re-election. Whig candidate Edward Kent defeated Democratic candidate Gorham Parks.

== Democratic convention ==
=== Nominee ===
- Gorham Parks, lawyer, U.S. representative

=== Eliminated at convention ===
- Rufus McIntire, land surveyor, former U.S. representative, veteran of the War of 1812

Democratic gubernatorial nomination
Party	Candidate	Votes	%
Democratic	Gorham Parks	167	54.93
Democratic	Rufus McIntire	137	45.07
Total votes		304	100.00

== Results ==
=== Candidates ===
- Edward Kent, mayor of Bangor, former state representative, candidate for governor in 1836 (Whig)

1837 Maine gubernatorial election
Party	Candidate	Votes	%	±%
Whig	Edward Kent	34,358	50.14%	▲8.63
Democratic	Gorham Parks	33,879	49.44%	▼8.78
Democratic	Rufus McIntire (Write-in)	125	0.18%	N/A
Write-in		161	0.24%	▼0.03
Majority		479	0.70%	▼16.00
Total votes		68,523	100.00%	▲25.30
Whig gain from Democratic				
