= Senator Vose =

Senator Vose may refer to:

- Richard H. Vose (1803–1864), Maine State Senate
- Roger Vose (1763–1841), New Hampshire State Senate
