= 1840 Maine gubernatorial election =

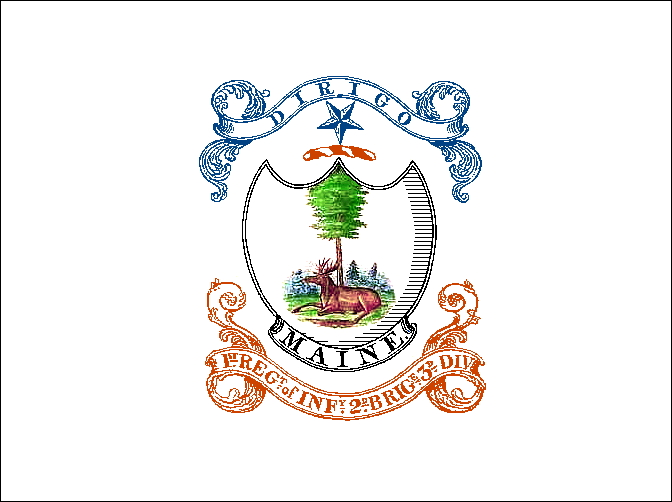
- September 14, 1840
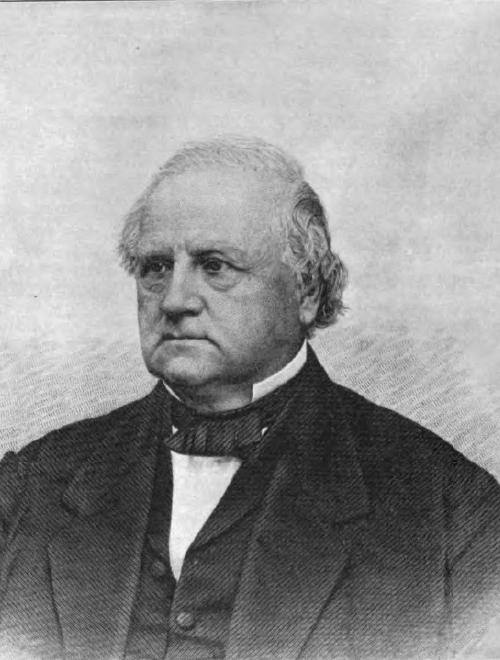

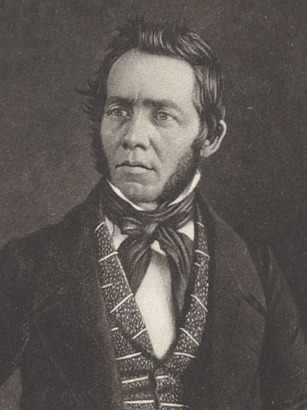
Nominee	Edward Kent	John Fairfield
Party	Whig	Democratic
Electoral vote	(Elected)
Popular vote	45,574	45,507
Percentage	49.98%	49.91%
- County results Kent: 50–60% 60–70% 70–80% Fairfield: 50–60% 60–70% 70–80% No Data/Vote
Governor before election
John Fairfield
Democratic
Elected Governor
Edward Kent
Whig

The 1840 Maine gubernatorial election took place on September 14, 1840. In a rematch of the previous two elections, the Whig nominee, former governor Edward Kent, defeated the incumbent Democratic governor John Fairfield, who was seeking a third term. This was the first time a former governor had successfully staged a political comeback to the office.

The election was closely watched by national press in the context of the 1840 United States presidential election and the narrow vote count separating the candidates resulted in the Maine legislature holding a contingent election to select the governor as neither candidate secured a majority of the vote.

== Background ==
Unlike other states, Maine held their statewide elections months prior to the 1840 United States presidential election, with the Maine state elections attracting national attention for their potential to foretell the outcome of the national contest. A fierce partisan campaign ensued, in which the Whigs sought to capitalize on the grassroots enthusiasm for their national ticket, headed by the former major general and United States senator from Ohio, William Henry Harrison by donning log cabin badges and other emblems of Harrison's presidential campaign.

=== Candidates ===
- John Fairfield, incumbent governor, former U.S. Representative (Democratic)
- Edward Kent, former governor, former mayor of Bangor, former state representative, unsuccessful candidate for governor in 1836, 1838, and 1839 (Whig)

== Election ==
On election day, early returns variously showed either Kent or Fairfield narrowly ahead, with neither candidate conceding defeat. Democrats alleged that 28 votes cast for Hannibal Hamlin, the Democratic candidate for the United States House of Representatives from Maine's 6th congressional district, had been intended for Fairfield which with the addition of other contested votes from unincorporated areas would give him a narrow majority. The legislature found that Kent had outpolled Fairfield by fewer than 70 votes, but it was less than a majority of the total electorate, with 98 votes for other candidates. State law required that if no candidate received a majority that the election would be referred to the Maine Senate, where the Whig majority elected Kent.

=== Results ===
1840 Maine gubernatorial election
Party	Candidate	Votes	%	±%
Whig	Edward Kent	45,574	49.98	▲4.25
Democratic	John Fairfield (incumbent)	45,507	49.91	▼4.09
Write-in		98	0.11	▼0.16
Total votes		91,179	100.00	▲19.98
Whig gain from Democratic				

== Aftermath ==
The importance of the Maine gubernatorial election and its building momentum for the presidential campaign would be repeated in future elections. Maine's status as a bellweather state resulted in the slogan "As Maine goes, so goes the nation."
