= 8th congressional district =

8th congressional district may refer to:

- Alabama's 8th congressional district (defunct)
- Arizona's 8th congressional district
- California's 8th congressional district
- Colorado's 8th congressional district
- Florida's 8th congressional district
- Georgia's 8th congressional district
- Illinois's 8th congressional district
- Indiana's 8th congressional district
- Iowa's 8th congressional district (defunct)
- Kansas's 8th congressional district (defunct)
- Kentucky's 8th congressional district (defunct)
- Louisiana's 8th congressional district (defunct)
- Maine's 8th congressional district (defunct)
- Maryland's 8th congressional district
- Massachusetts's 8th congressional district
- Michigan's 8th congressional district
- Minnesota's 8th congressional district
- Mississippi's 8th congressional district (defunct)
- Missouri's 8th congressional district
- New Jersey's 8th congressional district
- New York's 8th congressional district
- North Carolina's 8th congressional district
- Ohio's 8th congressional district
- Oklahoma's 8th congressional district (defunct)
- Pennsylvania's 8th congressional district
- South Carolina's 8th congressional district (defunct)
- Tennessee's 8th congressional district
- Texas's 8th congressional district
- Virginia's 8th congressional district
- Washington's 8th congressional district
- Wisconsin's 8th congressional district

== See also ==
- List of United States congressional districts
