= Governor Kent =

Governor Kent may refer to:

- Edward Kent (1802–1877), 12th and 15th Governor of Maine
- Joseph Kent (1779–1837), 19th Governor of Maryland
