= 1841 Maine gubernatorial election =

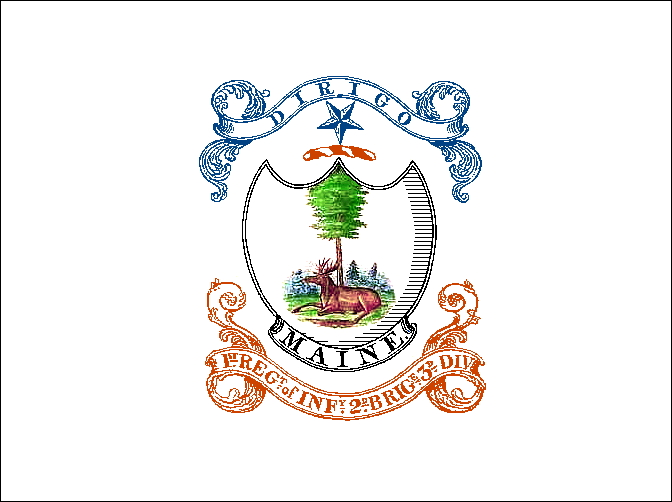
- September 13, 1841
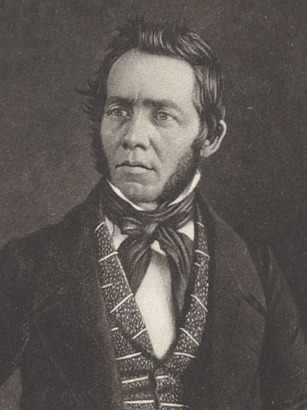

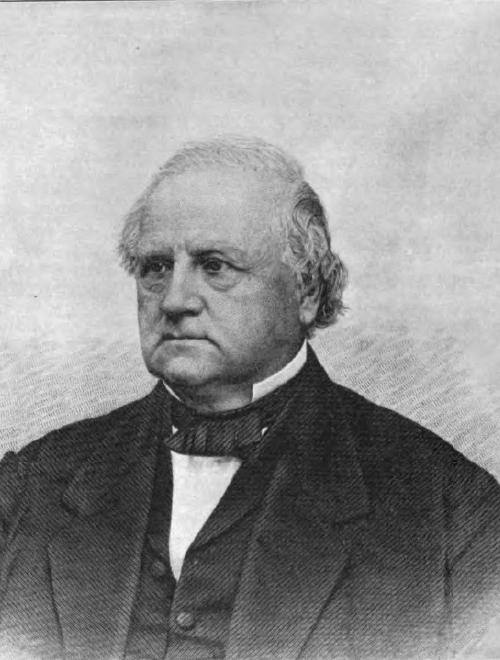
Nominee	John Fairfield	Edward Kent
Party	Democratic	Whig
Popular vote	47,354	36,790
Percentage	54.97%	42.70%
- County results Fairfield: 50–60% 60–70% 70–80% Kent: 40–50% 50–60%
Governor before election
Edward Kent
Whig
Elected Governor
John Fairfield
Democratic

The 1841 Maine gubernatorial election was held on September 13, 1841, in order to elect the Governor of Maine. Incumbent Whig Governor of Maine Edward Kent lost re-election in a fourth rematch against Democratic nominee and former Governor of Maine John Fairfield.

This was the last time a former governor of Maine completed a political comeback to serve a non-consecutive term.

== Candidates ==
- John Fairfield, former governor, former U.S. Representative, unsuccessful candidate for governor in 1840 (Democratic)
- Edward Kent, incumbent governor, former mayor of Bangor, former state representative, unsuccessful candidate for governor in 1836, 1838, and 1839 (Whig)
- Jeremiah Curtis (Liberty)

== General election ==
On election day, September 13, 1841, Whig nominee Edward Kent lost re-election by a margin of 10,564 votes against his opponent Democratic nominee John Fairfield, thereby losing Whig control over the office of Governor to the Democrats. Fairfield was sworn in as the 16th Governor of Maine on January 5, 1842.

This election marked the first time that the Liberty Party, an minor third party focused on the issue of abolitionism, ran a candidate for the office.

=== Results ===
Maine gubernatorial election, 1841
Party	Candidate	Votes	%	±%
Democratic	John Fairfield	47,354	54.97	▲5.06
Whig	Edward Kent (incumbent)	36,790	42.70	▼7.28
Liberty	Jeremiah Curtis	1,762	2.05	N/A
Write-in		247	0.29	▲0.18
Total votes		86,153	100.00	▼5.51
Democratic gain from Whig				
