= Senator Wheeler (disambiguation) =

Burton K. Wheeler (1882–1975) was a U.S. Senator from Montana from 1923 to 1947. Senator Wheeler may also refer to:

- Charles B. Wheeler Jr. (1926–2022), Missouri State Senate
- Clayton L. Wheeler (1876–1950), New York State Senate
- David Wheeler (South Dakota politician) (born 1979), South Dakota State Senate
- Edwin Wheeler (1828–1864), Wisconsin State Senate
- George F. Wheeler (1824–1903), Wisconsin State Senate
- Grattan H. Wheeler (1783–1852), New York State Senate
- Hamilton K. Wheeler (1848–1918), Illinois State Senate
- Harrison H. Wheeler (1839–1896), Michigan State Senate
- Hoyt Henry Wheeler (1833–1906), Vermont State Senate
- Jonas Wheeler (1789–1826), Maine State Senate
- Katie Wheeler (born 1940), New Hampshire State Senate
- Nathaniel Wheeler (1820–1893), Connecticut State Senate
- Osmer B. Wheeler (1809–1906), New York State Senate
- Phillip Wheeler (born 1978), Kentucky State Senate
- Thomas J. Wheeler (1803–1875), New York State Senate
- William A. Wheeler (1819–1887), New York State Senate
