= Thomas Davee =

American politician

Thomas Davee (December 9, 1797 – December 9, 1841) was a United States representative from Maine. He was born in Plymouth, Massachusetts, where he attended the common schools. Later, he moved to Maine, where he engaged in mercantile pursuits.

Davee was a member of the Maine House of Representatives in 1826 and 1827 and also served in the Maine Senate 1830–1832. He was the high sheriff of Somerset County, Maine, in 1835 and postmaster of Blanchard, Maine, from November 6, 1833, to March 24, 1837. He was elected as a Democrat to the Twenty-fifth and Twenty-sixth Congresses (March 4, 1837 – March 3, 1841) but was not a candidate for renomination in 1840.

After leaving Congress, Davee resumed mercantile pursuits. He was again a member of the Maine Senate in 1841 and served until his death in Blanchard, Maine, in 1841. He was buried in the Village Cemetery, Monson, Maine.

U.S. House of Representatives
Preceded by Gorham Parks	Member of the U.S. House of Representatives from Maine's 8th congressional district March 4, 1837 – March 3, 1841	Succeeded by Elisha Hunt Allen
