= Robert P. Dunlap =

American politician (1794–1859)

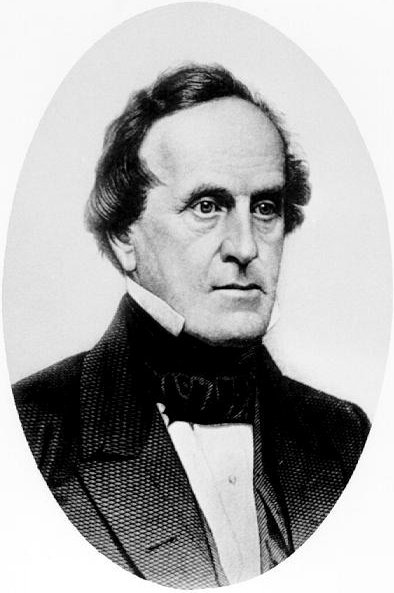

Member of U.S. House of Representatives from Maine's 2nd district
- In office March 4, 1843 – March 3, 1847
- Preceded by: William Pitt Fessenden
- Succeeded by: Asa Clapp

11th Governor of Maine
- In office January 1, 1834 – January 3, 1838
- Preceded by: Samuel E. Smith
- Succeeded by: Edward Kent

Member of the Maine Senate
- In office 1831–1833

Member of the Executive Council of Maine

7th President of the Maine Senate
- In office 1827–1828
- Preceded by: Jonas Wheeler
- Succeeded by: Nathan Cutler

Member of the Maine Senate
- In office 1824–1828

Personal details
- Born: August 17, 1794 Brunswick, Massachusetts (now Maine)
- Died: October 20, 1859 (aged 65) Brunswick, Maine, US
- Education: Bowdoin College

Robert Pinckney Dunlap (August 17, 1794 – October 20, 1859) was the 11th governor of Maine and a U.S. Representative from Maine.

== Biography ==
Born in Brunswick (in modern-day Maine, then a part of Massachusetts), Dunlap was educated by private tutors. He graduated from Bowdoin College, Brunswick, Maine, in 1815. His father, John Dunlap, was born in Dracut, Massachusetts in 1738 and was as a Massachusetts Bay Colonial Militia Captain who served during the French and Indian War, while his grandfather, Rev. Robert Dunlap, was born in 1715 in County Antrim, Ireland and was a Presbyterian minister trained at the University of Edinburgh. He studied law, was admitted to the bar in 1818, and commenced practice in Brunswick.

Dunlap served as a member of the Maine House of Representatives from 1821 to 1823. He served as president of the board of overseers of Bowdoin College from 1821 until his death. He served as member of the state militia, and was delegated to receive General Lafayette when he visited Maine in 1824.

Dunlap served in the State Senate 1824-1828 and 1831–1833, including three years as Senate President, in 1827, 1828, and 1831. He is, as of 2020, the only person to serve non-consecutive terms as Senate President. In between his Senate terms, he was a member of the Executive Council of Maine. He served four one-year terms as Governor of Maine from 1834 to 1838.

Dunlap was elected as a Democrat to the Twenty-eighth and Twenty-ninth Congresses (March 4, 1843 – March 3, 1847).

He served as chairman of the Committee on Public Expenditures (Twenty-ninth Congress). He served as collector of customs in Portland, Maine, in 1848-49, and postmaster of Brunswick in 1853-57.

== Death and burial ==
Dunlap died in Brunswick, Maine, October 20, 1859. He was interred in Pine Grove Cemetery.

Party political offices
Preceded by Samuel E. Smith	Democratic nominee for Governor of Maine; 1833, 1834, 1835, 1836	Succeeded by Gorham Parks
Political offices
Preceded by Samuel E. Smith	11th Governor of Maine; 1834-1838	Succeeded by Edward Kent
Preceded by Jonas Wheeler	7th President of the Maine Senate; 1827-1828	Succeeded by Nathan Cutler
U.S. House of Representatives
Preceded by William Pitt Fessenden	Member of the U.S. House of Representatives from Maine's 2nd congressional district March 4, 1843 – March 3, 1847	Succeeded by Asa Clapp
