= 1831 Maine gubernatorial election =

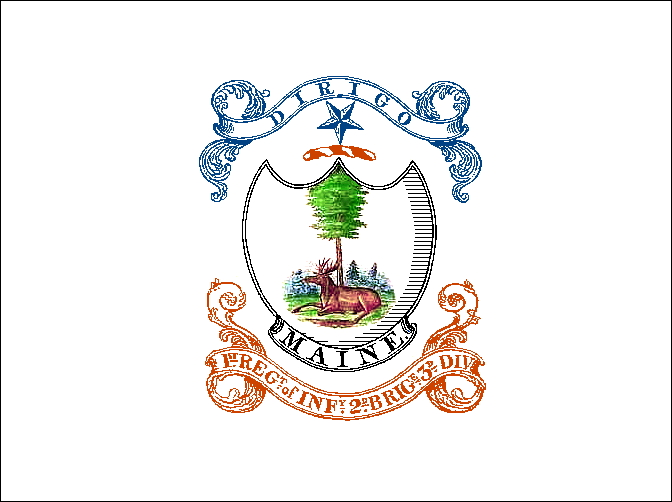
- September 12, 1831
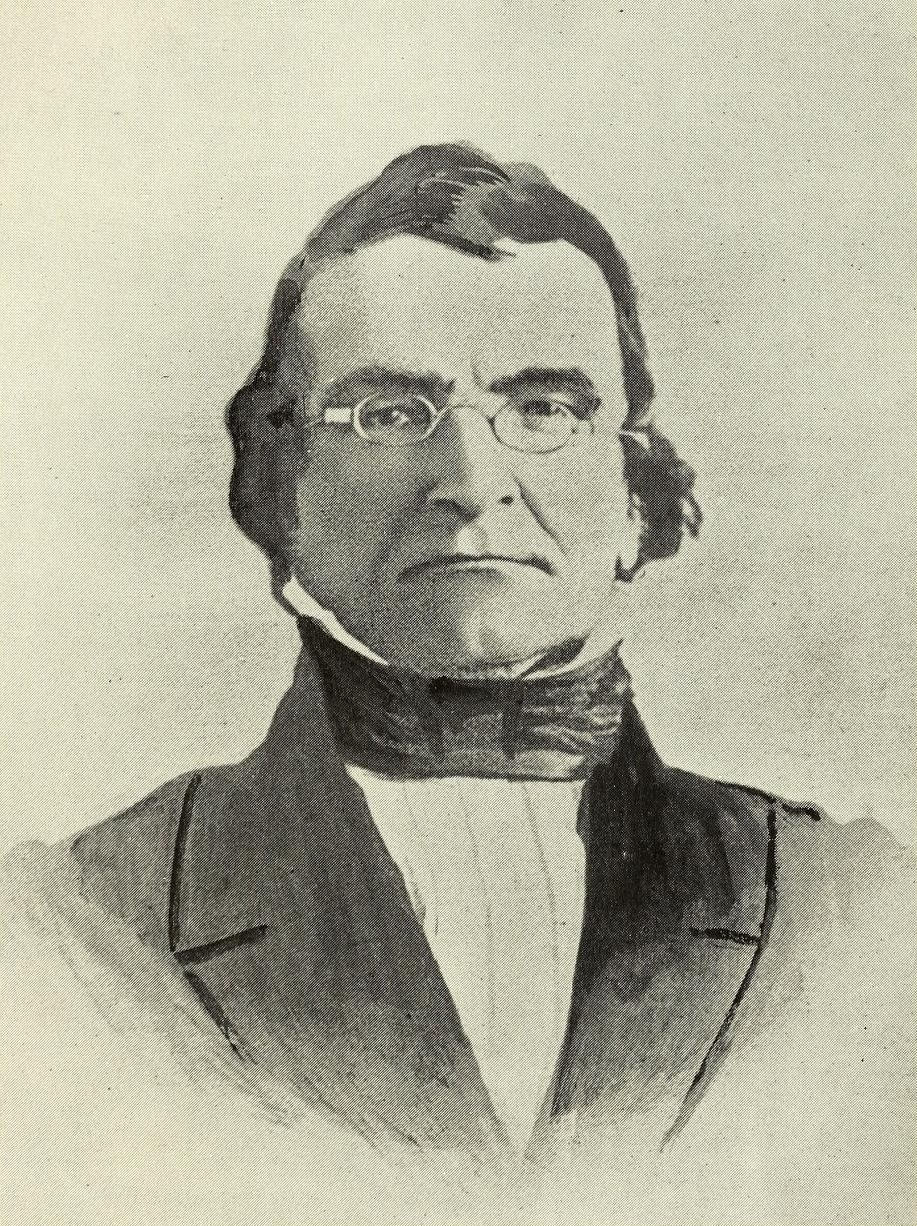

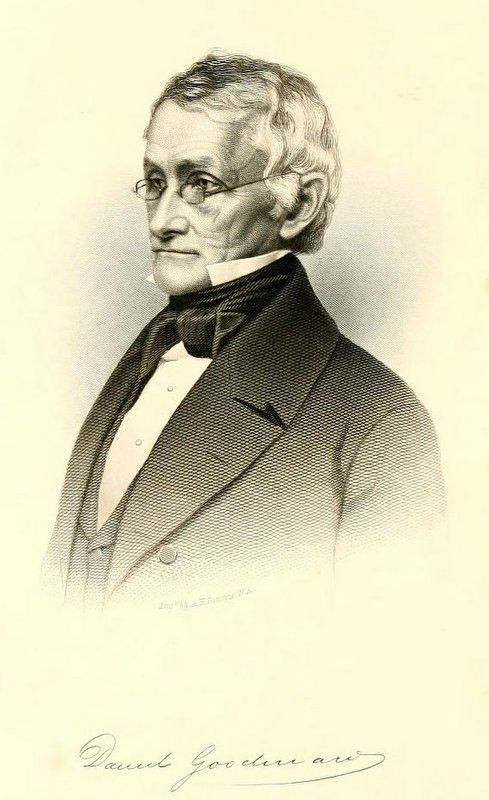
Nominee	Samuel E. Smith	Daniel Goodenow
Party	Democratic	National Republican
Popular vote	28,292	21,821
Percentage	56.34%	43.45%
- County results Smith: 50–60% 60–70% 70–80% Goodenow: 50–60%
Governor before election
Samuel E. Smith
Democratic
Elected Governor
Samuel E. Smith
Democratic

The 1831 Maine gubernatorial election took place on September 12, 1831. Incumbent Democratic Governor Samuel E. Smith was re-elected, defeating National Republican candidate Daniel Goodenow.

== Results ==
=== Candidates ===
- Daniel Goodenow, Speaker of the Maine House of Representatives (National Republican)
- Samuel E. Smith, incumbent governor (Democratic)

1831 Maine gubernatorial election (Note: Some sources give the result as Smith 28,368, Goodenow 21,976, Scattering 106. These figures include the votes from Wiscasset, which were rejected.)
Party	Candidate	Votes	%	±%
Democratic	Samuel E. Smith (incumbent)	28,292	56.34%	▲5.21
National Republican	Daniel Goodenow	21,821	43.45%	▼5.02
Write-in		106	0.21%	▼0.19
Majority		6,471	12.89%	▲10.23
Total votes		50,219	100.00%	▼15.02
Democratic hold				
