= 1832 Maine gubernatorial election =

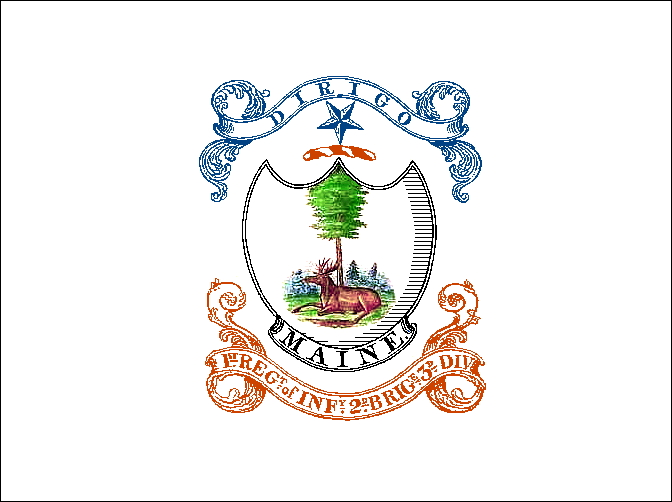
- September 10, 1832
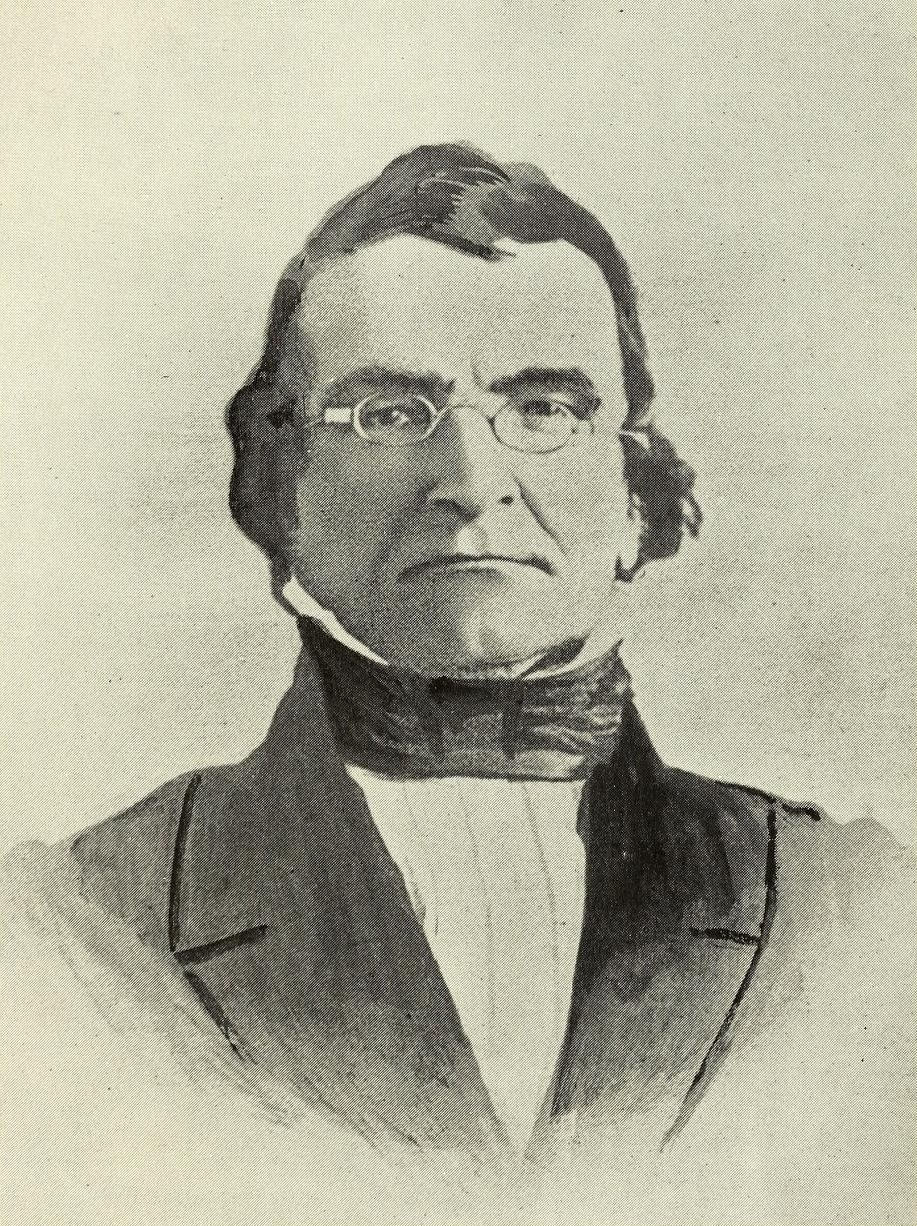

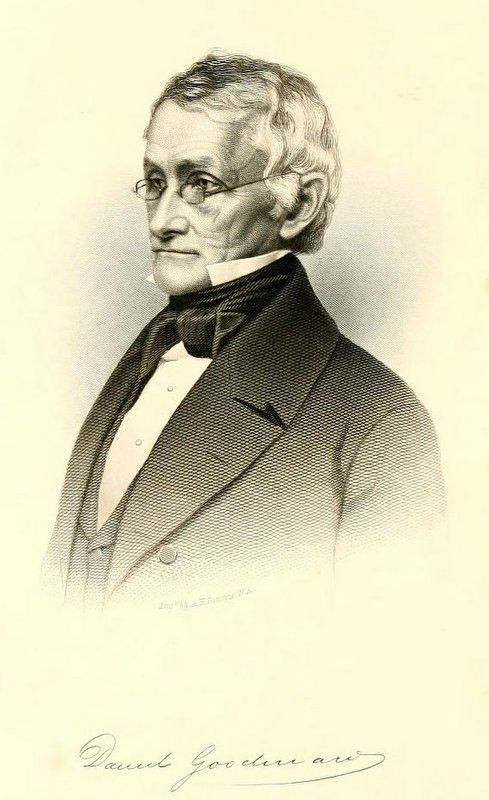
Nominee	Samuel E. Smith	Daniel Goodenow
Party	Democratic	National Republican
Popular vote	31,987	27,651
Percentage	52.79%	45.63%
- County results Smith: 50–60% 70–80% Goodenow: 40–50% 50–60% 60–70%
Governor before election
Samuel E. Smith
Democratic
Elected Governor
Samuel E. Smith
Democratic

The 1832 Maine gubernatorial election took place on September 10, 1832. Incumbent Democratic Governor Samuel E. Smith was re-elected to a third term, defeating National Republican candidate Daniel Goodenow in a re-match of the previous year's election.

== Results ==
=== Candidates ===
- Moses Carleton, businessman (Anti-Masonic)
- Daniel Goodenow, Speaker of the Maine House of Representatives, National Republican candidate for governor in 1831 (National Republican)
- Samuel E. Smith, incumbent governor (Democratic)

1832 Maine gubernatorial election
Party	Candidate	Votes	%	±%
Democratic	Samuel E. Smith (incumbent)	31,987	52.79%	▼3.55
National Republican	Daniel Goodenow	27,651	45.63%	▲2.18
Anti-Masonic	Moses Carleton	869	1.43%	N/A
Write-in		90	0.15%	▼0.06
Majority		4,336	7.16%	▼5.73
Total votes		60,597	100.00%	▲20.67
Democratic hold				
