= 1838 Maine gubernatorial election =

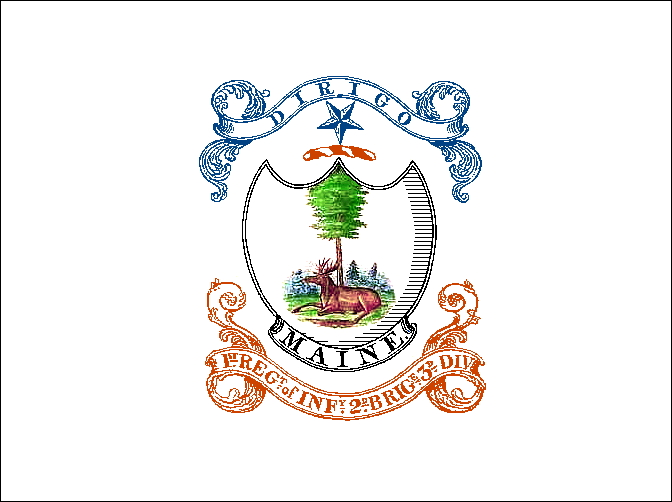
- September 10, 1838
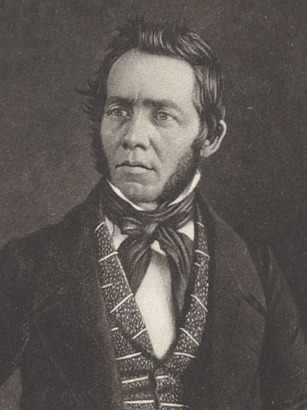

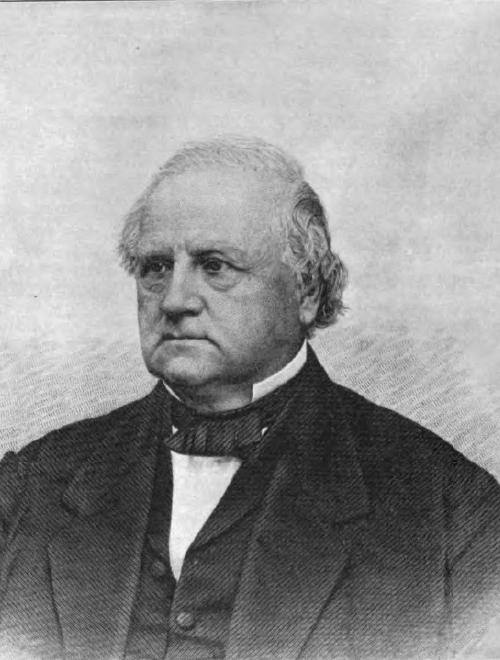
Nominee	John Fairfield	Edward Kent
Party	Democratic	Whig
Popular vote	46,216	42,897
Percentage	51.58%	47.88%
- County results Fairfield: 50–60% 60–70% 70–80% Kent: 50–60%
Governor before election
Edward Kent
Whig
Elected Governor
John Fairfield
Democratic

The 1838 Maine gubernatorial election took place on September 10, 1838. Incumbent Whig Governor Edward Kent was defeated for re-election by Democratic candidate John Fairfield.

== Results ==
=== Candidates ===
- John Fairfield, U.S. Representative (Democratic)
- Edward Kent, incumbent governor (Whig)
- Francis Ormand Jonathan "F. O. J." Smith, U.S. representative, former President of the Maine Senate (Conservative Democrat)

1838 Maine gubernatorial election
Party	Candidate	Votes	%	±%
Democratic	John Fairfield	46,216	51.58%	▲2.14
Whig	Edward Kent (incumbent)	42,897	47.88%	▼2.26
Independent Democrat	F. O. J. Smith	405	0.45%	N/A
Write-in		81	0.09%	▼0.15
Majority		3,319	3.70%	▲3.00
Total votes		89,599	100.00%	▲30.76
Democratic gain from Whig				
