= Daniel Goodenow =

American judge

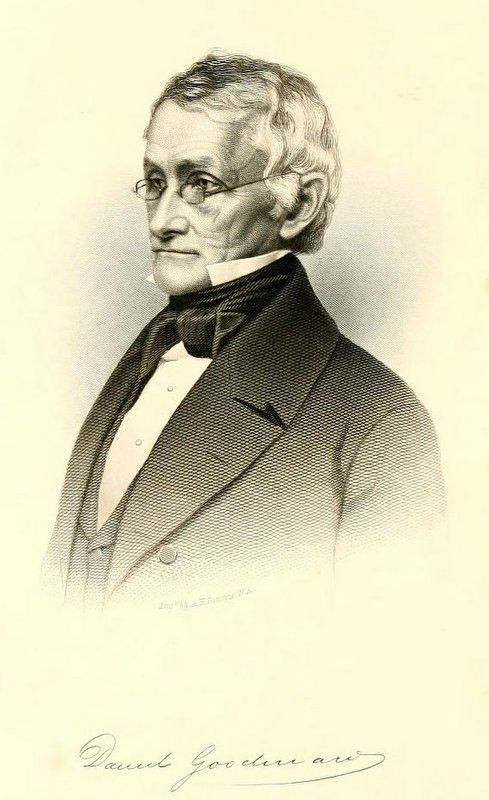

Daniel Goodenow (October 30, 1793 – October 7, 1863) was an American politician and jurist from Maine. Goodenow was born in Henniker, New Hampshire and was primarily self-educated, though he did graduate from Dartmouth College. He studied law under future U.S. Senator John Holmes and was admitted to the York County, Maine Bar in 1817. Residing in Alfred, Maine, Goodenow served three one year terms in the Maine House of Representatives (1827, 1828 and 1830), which included a term as Speaker of the Maine House of Representatives. He was a member of the National Republican Party while in the Legislature. In 1831, Goodenow was the National Republican Party candidate for Governor. Unsuccessful, he ran again in 1832 and 1833. In 1838 and 1841, Goodenow served as Maine Attorney General.

On October 10, 1855, Republican Governor Anson Morrill appointed Goodenow to a 7-year term as an associate justice of the Maine Supreme Judicial Court. He retired after his first term ended in 1862 and died in Alfred a year later on October 7, 1863.

Party political offices
| Preceded by Jonathan G. Hunton | National Republican nominee for Governor of Maine; 1831, 1832, 1833 | Succeeded by None |
Legal offices
| Preceded by Nathan Clifford | Maine Attorney General; 1838 | Succeeded by Stephen Emery |
| Preceded by Stephen Emery | Maine Attorney General; 1841 | Succeeded by Otis L. Bridges |
