= 1834 Maine gubernatorial election =

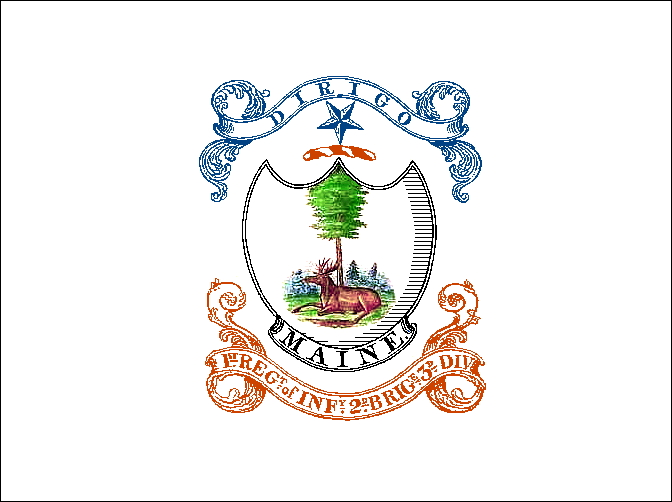
- September 8, 1834
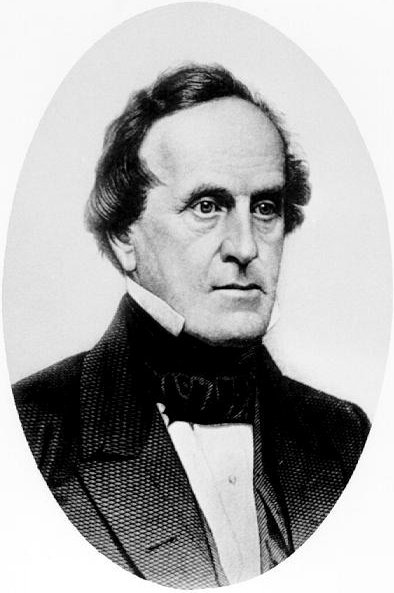

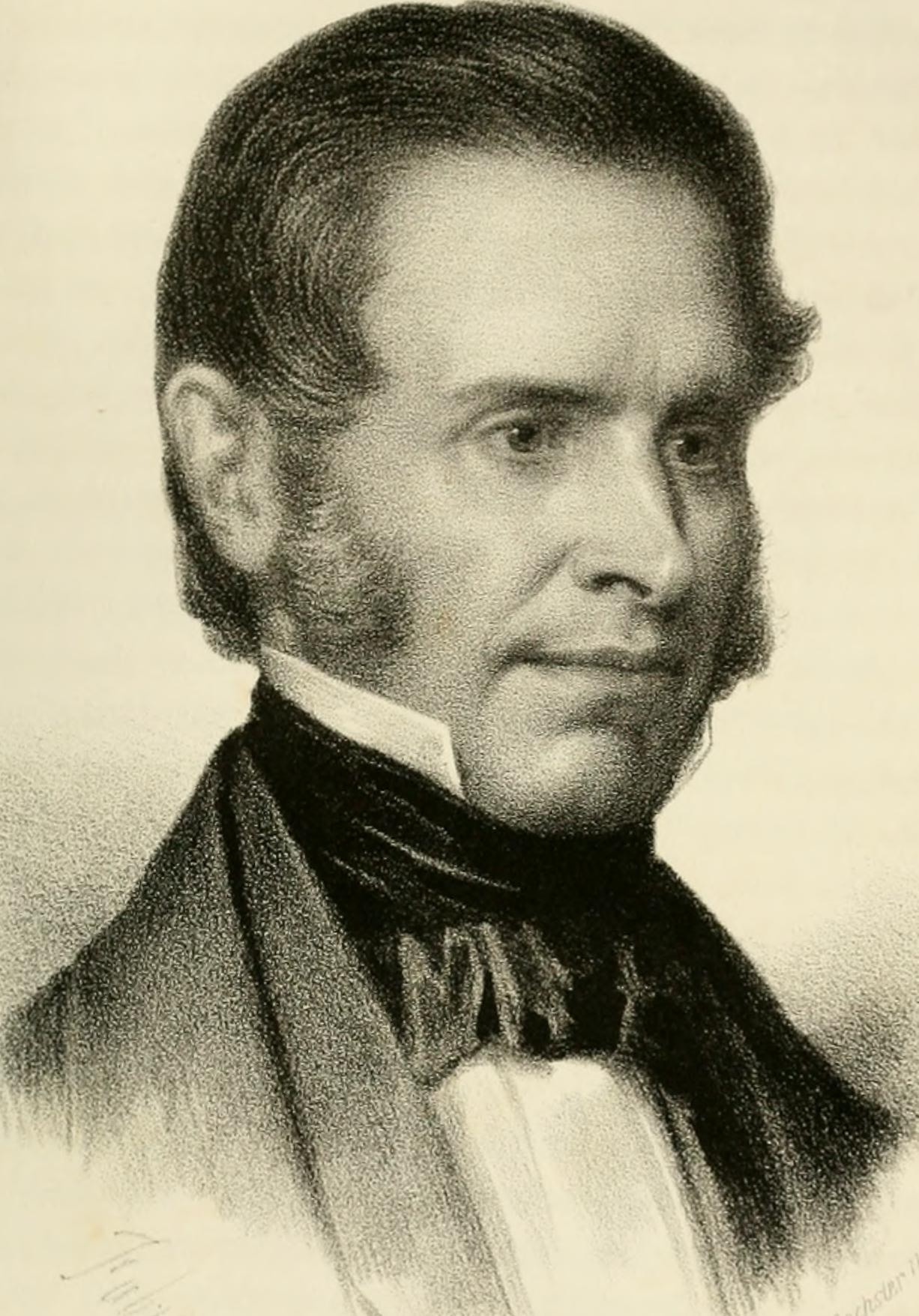
Nominee	Robert P. Dunlap	Peleg Sprague
Party	Democratic	Whig
Popular vote	37,481	32,967
Percentage	52.35%	46.04%
- County results Dunlap: 50–60% 60–70% Sprague: 50–60% 60–70%
Governor before election
Robert P. Dunlap
Democratic
Elected Governor
Robert P. Dunlap
Democratic

The 1834 Maine gubernatorial election took place on September 8, 1834. Incumbent Democratic Governor Robert P. Dunlap defeated Whig candidate Peleg Sprague.

== Results ==
=== Candidates ===
- Robert P. Dunlap, incumbent governor (Democratic)
- Thomas A. Hill, lawyer, banker, and speculator, candidate for governor in 1833 (Anti-Masonic)
- Peleg Sprague, U.S. Senator, former U.S. Representative (Whig)

1834 Maine gubernatorial election (Note: Almost all 21st century sources give the result as Dunlap 38,133, Sprague 33,732, Hill 1,076, Scattering 90. These figures include 1,429 votes which were rejected.)
Party	Candidate	Votes	%	±%
Democratic	Robert P. Dunlap (incumbent)	37,481	52.35%	▲0.21
Whig	Peleg Sprague	32,967	46.04%	▲9.34
Anti-Masonic	Thomas A. Hill	1,076	1.50%	▼3.33
Write-in		78	0.11%	▼0.09
Majority		4,514	6.31%	▼9.13
Total votes		71,602	100.00%	▲45.1
Democratic hold				
