= Jonas Cutting–Edward Kent House =

Historic house in Maine, United States

- U.S. National Register of Historic Places
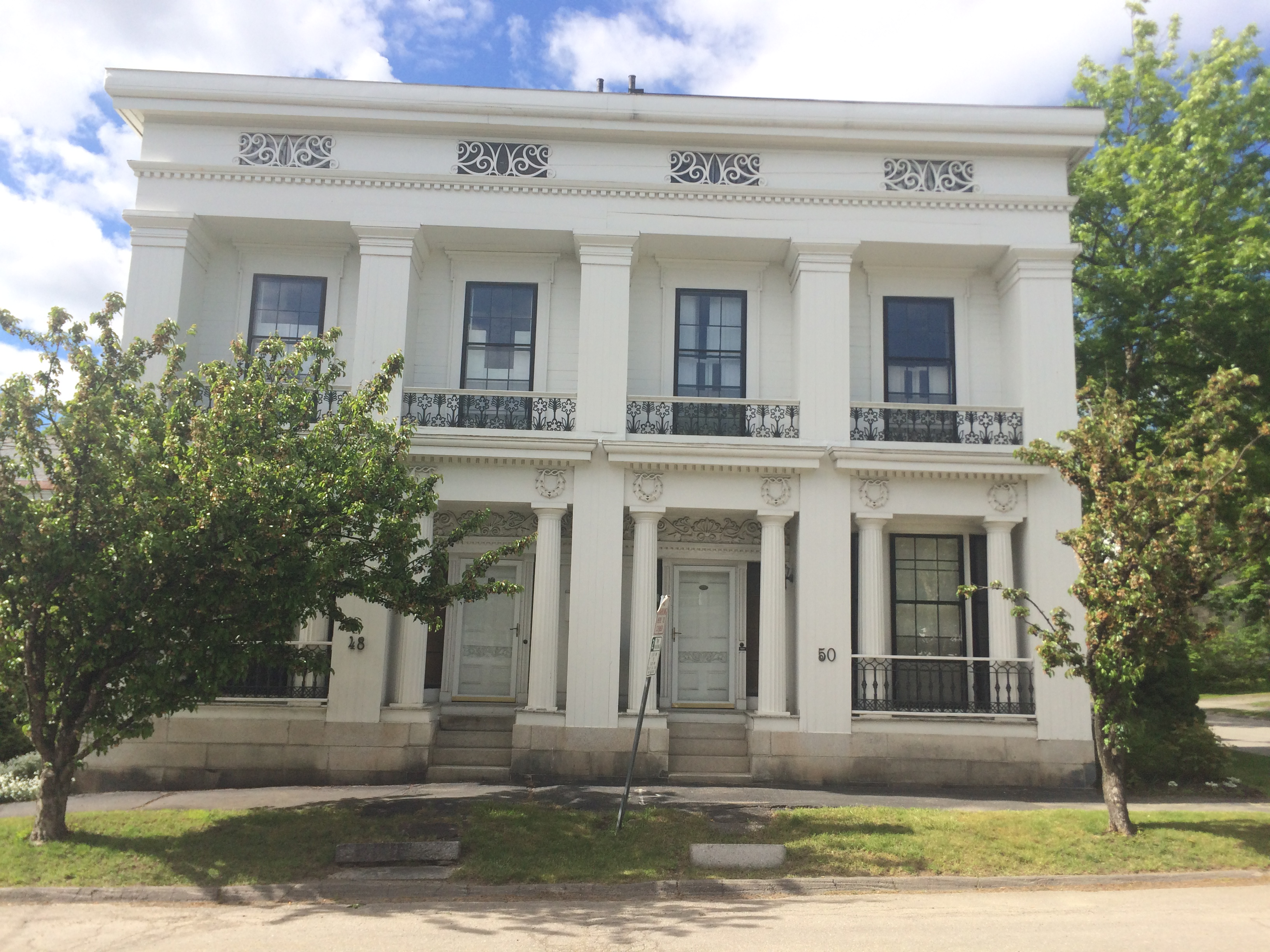
- The Jonas Cutting–Edward Kent House in June 2017

- Location within Maine Location within the United States
- Location: 48-50 Penobscot St., Bangor, Maine
- Coordinates: 44.8049°N 68.7672°W
- Area: less than one acre
- Built: 1836
- Architect: Charles Grandison Bryant
- Architectural style: Greek Revival
- NRHP reference No.: 73000137
- Added to NRHP: April 2, 1973

The Jonas Cutting–Edward Kent House is a historic house at 48-50 Penobscot Street in Bangor, Maine. Built in 1836–37, it is one of the city's most unusual and elaborate examples of Greek Revival architecture. Built as a duplex, its first owners and occupants were Edward Kent, mayor and a future Governor of Maine, and his law partner, Jonas Cutting, a future Maine Supreme Judicial Court justice. The house was listed on the National Register of Historic Places in 1973.

== Description and history ==
The Cutting-Kent House is located just in a residential area just northeast of Bangor's downtown, at the northwest corner of Penobscot and Pine Streets. It consists of a large two-story wood frame main block, to which additions have been made to the rear. The main block has elaborate and distinctive Greek Revival styling. Its front facade (facing south toward Penobscot street) has four bays recessed behind matchboarded walls headed by Doric pilasters. The first-floor bays have fluted Doric columns at each side, topped by carved wreaths. The center bays house the two unit entrances, and the outer bays have full-length windows; these all have flanking sidelight windows, and the window bays have wrought iron railings across the front. The upper-level window bays also have ornate railings across the bays. The first floor of each side has a rounded window bay topped by a railing similar to the second-floor railings of the front. There is a dentillated cornice line between the floors and above the second floor, with a frieze board above that is punctuated by window openings covered with painted metal grillwork. The roof is a low-pitch hip roof. The rear additions added to each unit date to later in the 19th century, and are not as architecturally sophisticated.

The house was built in 1836-37 for Edward Kent, then mayor of Bangor, and Jonas Cutting, his law partner. The house is of a sophistication that was typical of the residences of the city's elite lumber barons, and is believed to be stylistically unique in New England. Kent went on to serve two terms as Governor of Maine (1838–40), and Cutting was appointed to Maine's highest court in 1859 after serving the nation's diplomatic corps.

== See also ==
- National Register of Historic Places listings in Penobscot County, Maine
