= 1836 Maine gubernatorial election =

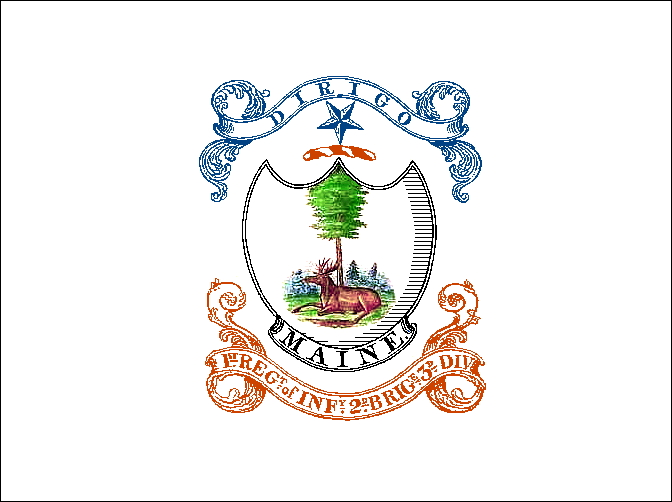
- September 12, 1836
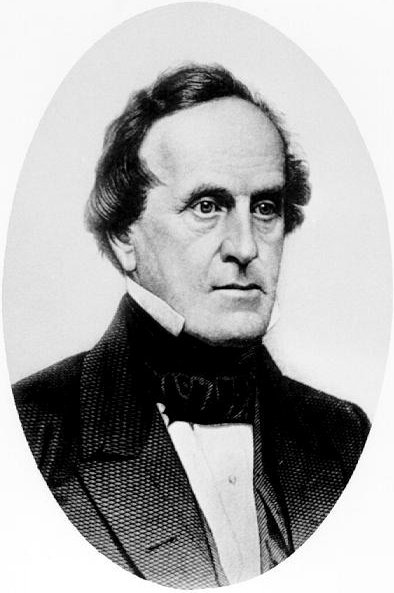

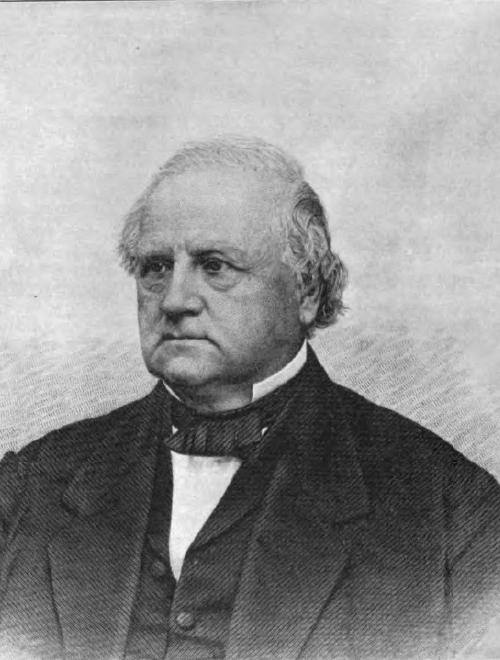
Nominee	Robert P. Dunlap	Edward Kent
Party	Democratic	Whig
Popular vote	31,837	22,703
Percentage	58.22%	41.51%
- County results Dunlap: 50–60% 60–70% 70–80% 80–90% Kent: 50–60%
Governor before election
Robert P. Dunlap
Democratic
Elected Governor
Robert P. Dunlap
Democratic

The 1836 Maine gubernatorial election took place on September 12, 1836. Incumbent Democratic Governor Robert P. Dunlap won re-election to a fourth term.

== Results ==
=== Candidates ===
- Robert P. Dunlap, incumbent governor (Democratic)
- Edward Kent, mayor of Bangor, former state representative (Whig)

1836 Maine gubernatorial election
Party	Candidate	Votes	%	±%
Democratic	Robert P. Dunlap (incumbent)	31,837	58.22%	▼3.13
Whig	Edward Kent	22,703	41.51%	▲4.22
Write-in		148	0.27%	▼1.09
Majority		9,134	16.70%	▼7.36
Total votes		54,688	100.00%	▲20.97
Democratic hold				
