= 1839 Maine gubernatorial election =

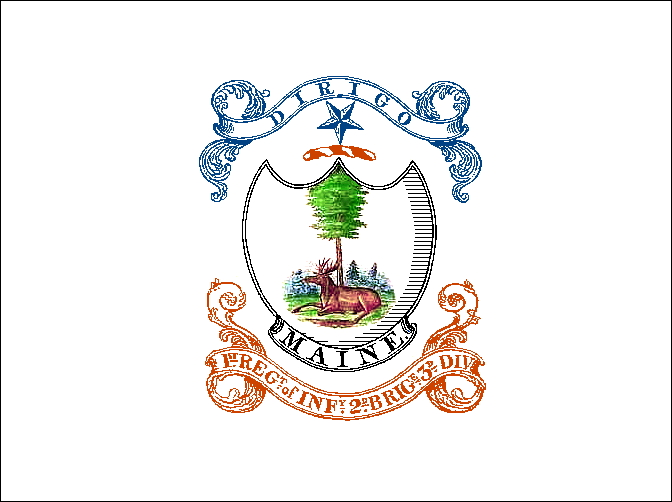
- September 9, 1839
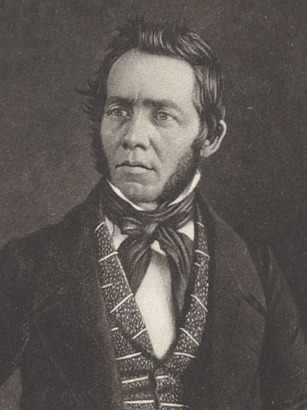

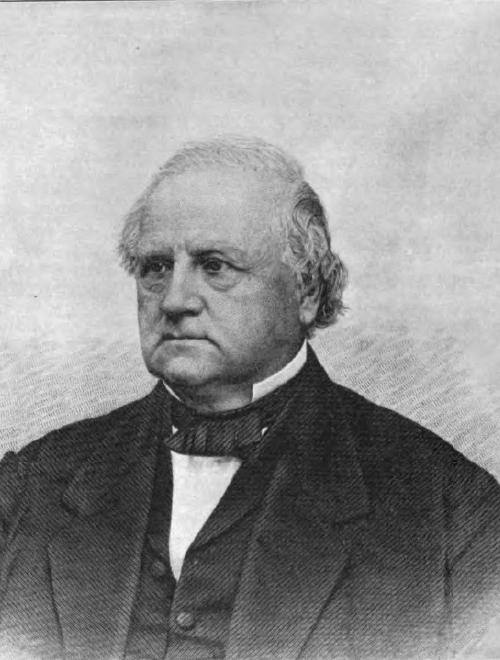
Nominee	John Fairfield	Edward Kent
Party	Democratic	Whig
Popular vote	41,038	34,749
Percentage	54.00%	45.73%
- County results Fairfield: 50–60% 60–70% Kent: 50–60% 60–70% No Data/Vote
Governor before election
John Fairfield
Democratic
Elected Governor
John Fairfield
Democratic

The 1839 Maine gubernatorial election took place on September 9, 1839. Incumbent Democratic Governor John Fairfield defeated Whig candidate and former Governor Edward Kent in a re-match of the previous year's election.

== Results ==
=== Candidates ===
- John Fairfield, incumbent governor, former U.S. Representative (Democratic)
- Edward Kent, former governor, former mayor of Bangor, former state representative (Whig)

1839 Maine gubernatorial election (Note: Some sources give the result as Fairfield 39,221, Kent 33,339, Scattering 208. These figures exclude the votes for Fairfield and Kent from Franklin County.)
Party	Candidate	Votes	%	±%
Democratic	John Fairfield (incumbent)	41,038	54.00%	▲2.42
Whig	Edward Kent	34,749	45.73%	▼2.15
Write-in		208	0.27%	▲0.18
Majority		6,289	8.27%	▲4.57
Total votes		75,995	100.00%	▼15.18
Democratic hold				
