= William Burleigh =

American politician

Member of the U.S. House of Representatives from Maine's 1st district
- In office March 4, 1823 – July 2, 1827
- Preceded by: Joseph Dane
- Succeeded by: Rufus McIntire

Personal details
- Born: October 24, 1785 Northwood, New Hampshire, U.S.
- Died: July 2, 1827 (aged 41) South Berwick, Maine, U.S.
- Party: Anti-Jacksonian
- Other political affiliations: Democratic-Republican (until 1825)
- Children: John
- Profession: Politician, Lawyer

William Burleigh (October 24, 1785 – July 2, 1827) was a United States representative from Maine. He was born in Northwood, New Hampshire, on October 24, 1785. He moved with his parents to Gilmanton, New Hampshire, in 1788 where he attended the common schools and taught for several years. He then studied law, was admitted to the bar in 1815 and commenced practice in South Berwick, Maine.

He was elected as an Adams-Clay Democratic-Republican to the Eighteenth United States Congress and as an Adams candidate to the Nineteenth, and Twentieth Congresses, and served in the U.S. Congress from March 4, 1823, until his death in South Berwick on July 2, 1827. He served as chairman of Committee on Expenditures in the Department of the Treasury for the Nineteenth Congress. His interment was in Portland Street Cemetery. His son was the later Maine state legislator and U.S. representative, John Holmes Burleigh.

== See also ==
- List of members of the United States Congress who died in office (1790–1899)

U.S. House of Representatives
Preceded by Joseph Dane	Member of the U.S. House of Representatives from Maine's 1st congressional district March 3, 1823 - July 2, 1827	Succeeded by Rufus McIntire
