= 1833 Maine gubernatorial election =

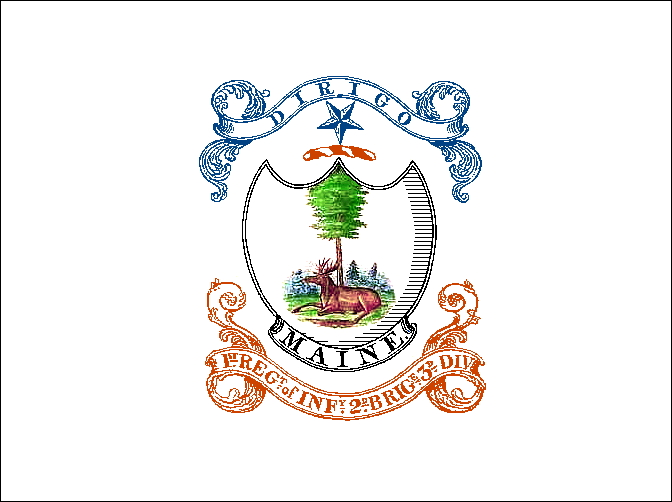
- September 9, 1833
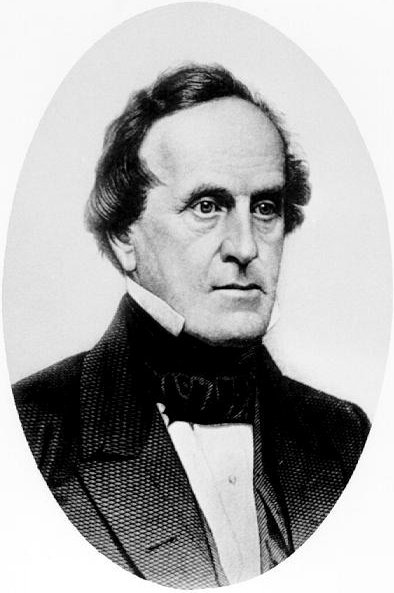

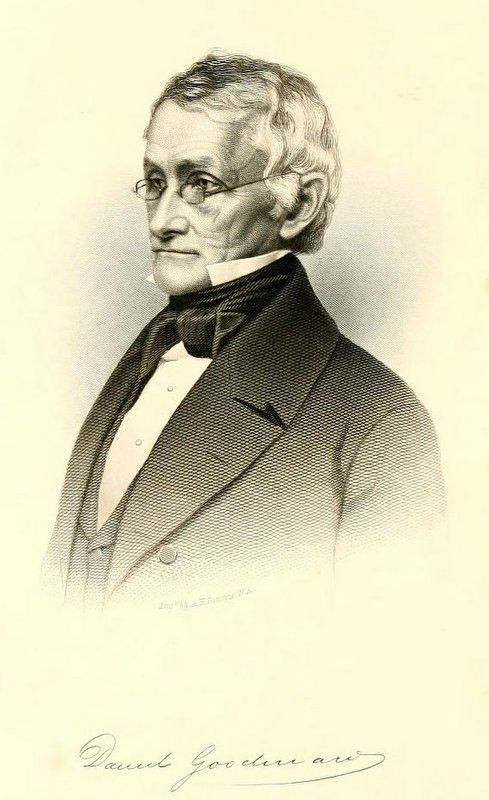

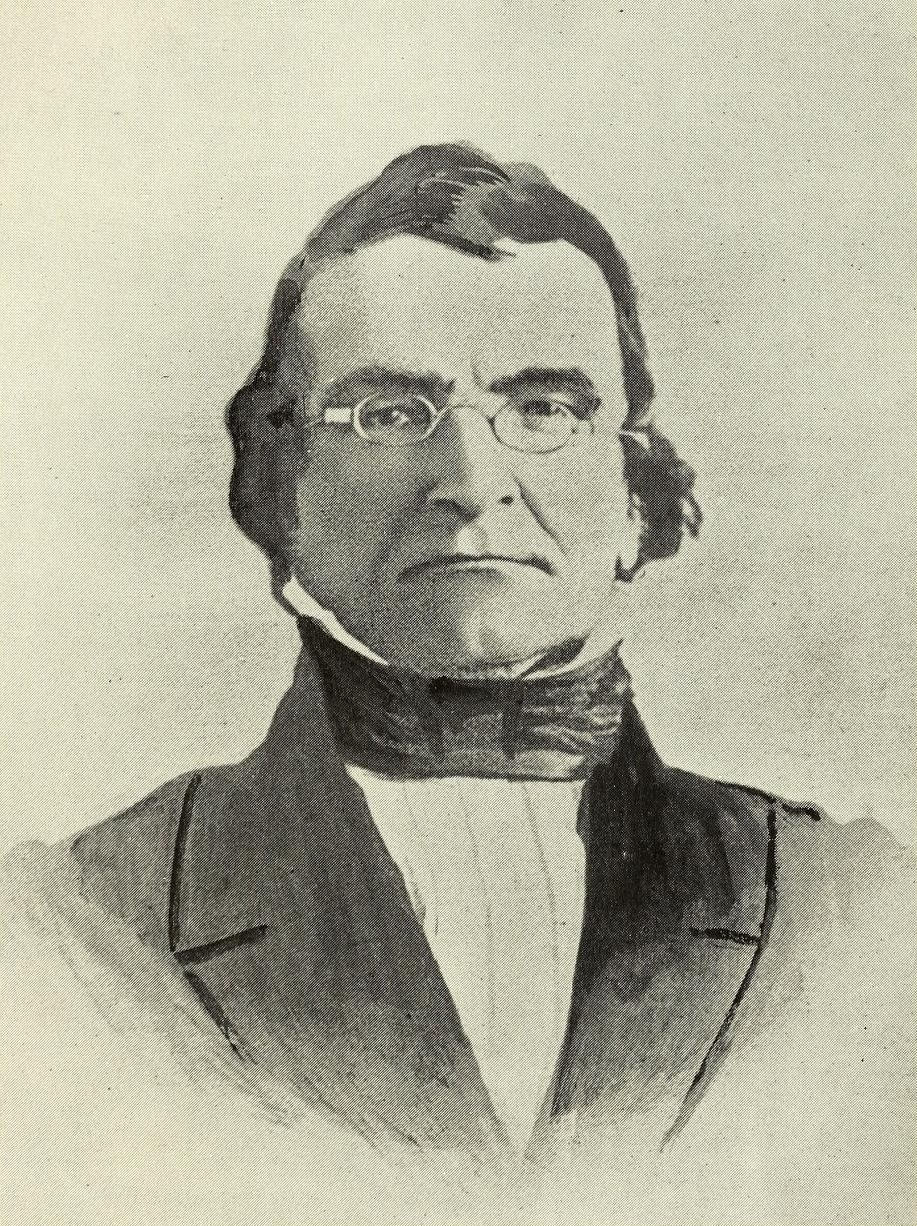
Nominee	Robert P. Dunlap	Daniel Goodenow	Samuel E. Smith
Party	Democratic	National Republican	Independent Democrat
Popular vote	25,731	18,112	3,024
Percentage	52.14%	36.70%	6.13%
- County results Dunlap: 40–50% 50–60% 60–70% 70–80% Goodenow: 50–60%
Governor before election
Samuel E. Smith
Democratic
Elected Governor
Robert P. Dunlap
Democratic

The 1833 Maine gubernatorial election took place on September 9, 1833. Incumbent Democratic Governor Samuel E. Smith was defeated for re-nomination by Robert P. Dunlap. Smith ran for re-election as an Independent Democrat.

Dunlap defeated National Republican candidate Daniel Goodenow and Smith with 52.14% of the vote.

== Democratic nomination ==
The Democratic state convention was held on June 26, 1833, at Augusta, Maine.

=== Nominee ===
- Robert P. Dunlap, state senator, former President of the Maine Senate, former member of the Executive Council

=== Lost at convention ===
- Samuel E. Smith, incumbent governor (Democratic)

Democratic gubernatorial nomination, 1st ballot
Party	Candidate	Votes	%
Democratic	Robert P. Dunlap	185	68.3
Democratic	Samuel E. Smith	79	29.1
Scattering		7	2.6
Total votes		271	100.00

== Results ==
=== Candidates ===
- Daniel Goodenow, former Speaker of the Maine House of Representatives, National Republican candidate for governor in 1831 and 1832 (National Republican)
- Thomas A. Hill, lawyer, banker, and speculator (Anti-Masonic)

1833 Maine gubernatorial election
Party	Candidate	Votes	%	±%
Democratic	Robert P. Dunlap	25,731	52.14%	▼0.65
National Republican	Daniel Goodenow	18,112	36.70%	▼8.93
Independent Democrat	Samuel E. Smith (incumbent)	3,024	6.13%	N/A
Anti-Masonic	Thomas A. Hill	2,384	4.83%	▲3.40
Write-in		101	0.20%	▲0.05
Majority		7,619	15.44%	▲8.28
Total votes		49,352	100.00%	▼18.56
Democratic hold				
