= 1835 Maine gubernatorial election =

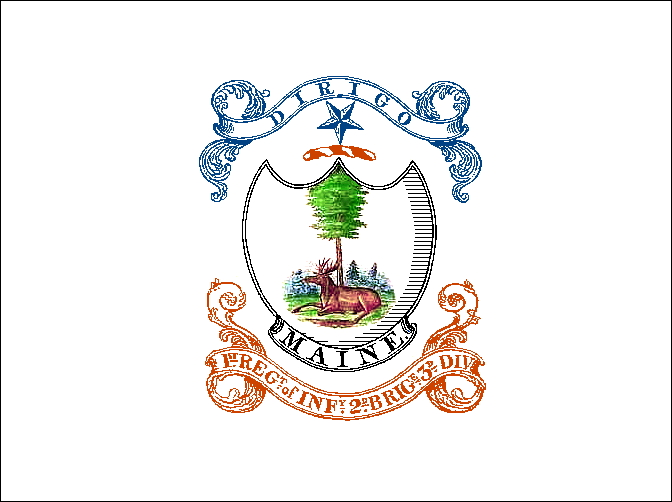
- September 14, 1835
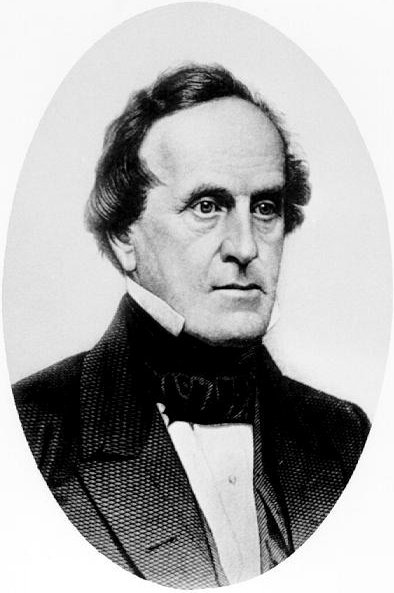

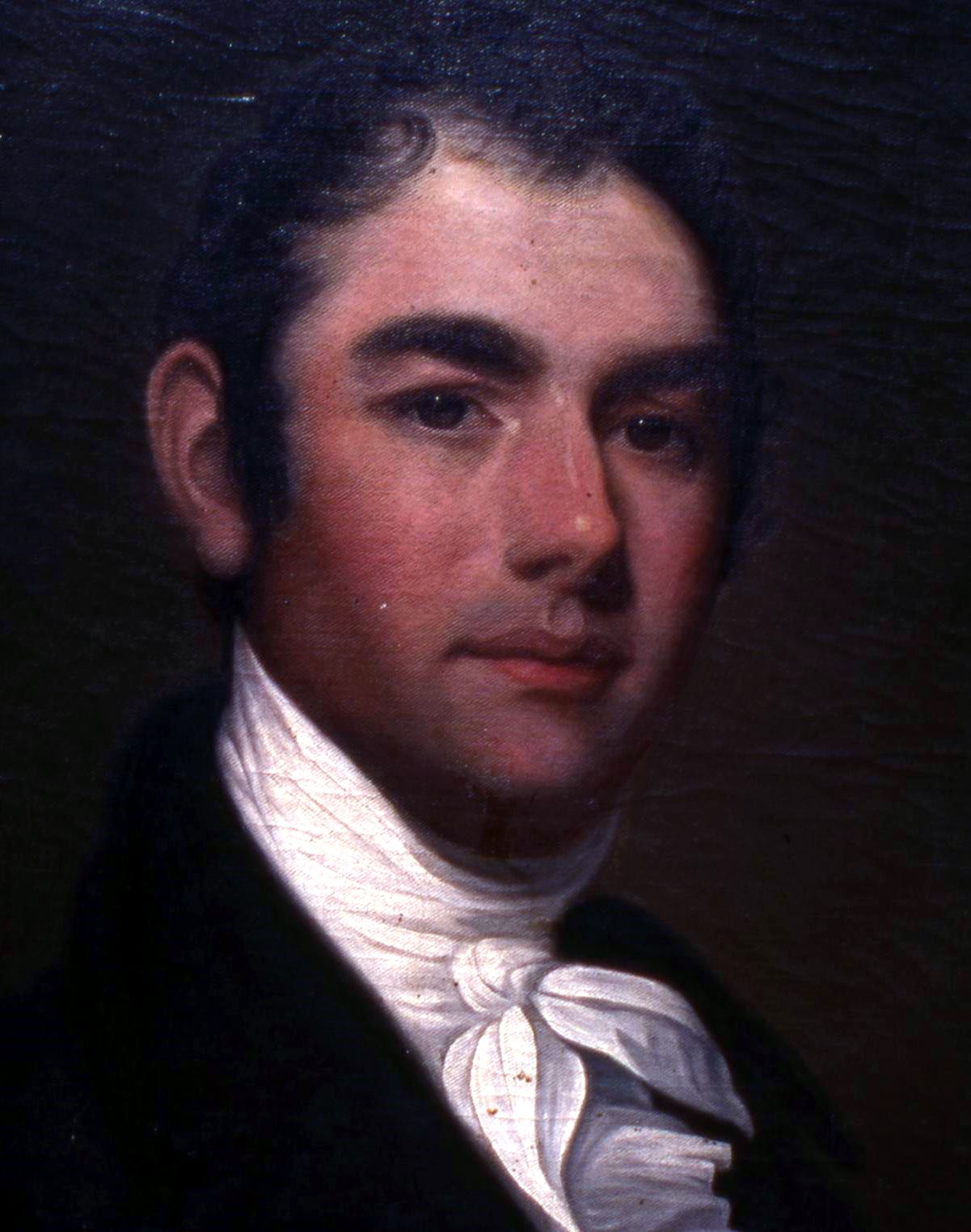
Nominee	Robert P. Dunlap	William King
Party	Democratic	Whig
Popular vote	27,733	16,860
Percentage	61.35%	37.29%
- County results Dunlap: 50–60% 60–70% 90–100% King: 40–50%
Governor before election
Robert P. Dunlap
Democratic
Elected Governor
Robert P. Dunlap
Democratic

The 1835 Maine gubernatorial election took place on September 14, 1835 to elect the Governor of Maine. The Democratic incumbent Robert P. Dunlap to a third term defeating Whig candidate William King.

== Results ==
=== Candidates ===
- Robert P. Dunlap, incumbent governor (Democratic)
- William King, former governor (1820-1821), Customs Collector of Bath, former member of the Spanish Claims Commission under the Adams–Onís Treaty

1835 Maine gubernatorial election (Note: Some sources give Dunlap's vote as 45,208.)
Party	Candidate	Votes	%	±%
Democratic	Robert P. Dunlap (incumbent)	27,733	61.35%	▲9.00
Whig	William King	16,860	37.29%	▼8.75
Write-in		615	1.36%	▲1.25
Majority		10,873	24.06%	▲17.75
Total votes		45,208	100.00%	▼36.86
Democratic hold				
