= List of United States senators in the 23rd Congress =

This is a complete list of United States senators during the 23rd United States Congress listed by seniority from March 4, 1833, to March 3, 1835.

Order of service is based on the commencement of the senator's first term. Behind this is former service as a senator (only giving the senator seniority within their new incoming class), service as vice president, a House member, a cabinet secretary, or a governor of a state. The final factor is the population of the senator's state.

Senators who were sworn in during the middle of the two-year congressional term (up until the last senator who was not sworn in early after winning the November 1834 election) are listed at the end of the list with no number.

== Terms of service ==
Class	Terms of service of senators that expired in years
Class 2	Terms of service of senators that expired in 1835 (AL, DE, GA, IL, KY, LA, MA, MS, NC, NH, NJ, RI, SC, and VA.)
Class 3	Terms of service of senators that expired in 1837 (AL, CT, IL, IN, KY, LA, MD, ME, MO, MS, NC, NH, NJ, NY, OH, PA, SC, TN, and VT.)
Class 1	Terms of service of senators that expired in 1839 (CT, DE, GA, IN, MA, MD, ME, MO, NY, OH, PA, RI, TN, VA, and VT.)

== U.S. Senate seniority list ==
U.S. Senate seniority
Rank	Senator (party-state)	Seniority date	Other factors
1	William Rufus de Vane King (J-AL)	December 14, 1819	
2	Nehemiah Rice Knight (AJ-RI)	January 9, 1821	
3	Thomas Hart Benton (D-MO)	August 10, 1821	
4	Samuel Bell (AJ-NH)	March 4, 1823	
5	Josiah Stoddard Johnston (AJ-LA)	January 15, 1824	
6	William Hendricks (AJ-IN)	March 4, 1825	Former representative
7	Elias Kent Kane (J-IL)	March 4, 1825	
8	Hugh Lawson White (J-TN)	October 28, 1825	
9	Ashur Robbins (AJ-RI)	October 31, 1825	
10	Ezekiel Forman Chambers (AJ-VA)	January 24, 1826	
11	Nathaniel Silsbee (AJ-MA)	May 31, 1826	
12	John Tyler (AJ-VA)	March 4, 1827	
13	Daniel Webster (AJ-MA)	June 8, 1827	
14	George Mortimer Bibb (AJ-KY)	March 4, 1829	Former senator (3 years)
15	George Michael Troup (J-GA)	March 4, 1829	Former senator (1 year)
16	Peleg Sprague (AJ-ME)	March 4, 1829	Former representative
17	Theodore Frelinghuysen (AJ-NJ)	March 4, 1829	New Jersey 13th in population (1820)
18	John Middleton Clayton (AJ-DE)	March 4, 1829	Delaware 22nd in population (1820)
19	Felix Grundy (D-TN)	October 19, 1829	
20	John Forsyth (J-GA)	November 9, 1829	
21	Bedford Brown (D-NC)	December 9, 1829	
22	Arnold Naudain (AJ-DE)	January 13, 1830	
23	George Poindexter (AJ-MS)	October 15, 1830	
24	John McCracken Robinson (J-IL)	December 11, 1830	
25	Gideon Tomlinson (AJ-CT)	March 4, 1831	Former representative (8 years); Connecticut 14th in population (1820)
26	Gabriel Moore (J-AL)	March 4, 1831	Former representative (8 years); Alabama 19th in population (1820)
27	Willie Person Mangum (AJ-NC)	March 4, 1831	Former representative (3 years)
28	William Wilkins (J-PA)	March 4, 1831	Pennsylvania 2nd in population (1820)
29	Thomas Ewing (AJ-OH)	March 4, 1831	Ohio 5th in population (1820)
30	Isaac Hill (J-NH)	March 4, 1831	New Hampshire 15th in population (1820)
31	Samuel Prentiss (AJ-VT)	March 4, 1831	Vermont 16th in population (1820)
32	Alexander Buckner (J-MO)	March 4, 1831	Missouri 23rd in population (1820)
33	Henry Clay (AJ-KY)	November 10, 1831	
34	George Augustus Waggaman (AJ-LA)	November 15, 1831	
35	John Tipton (J-IN)	January 3, 1832	
36	John Black (J-MS)	November 12, 1832	
37	William Cabell Rives (AJ-VA)	December 10, 1832	
38	John Caldwell Calhoun (N-SC)	December 29, 1832	
39	Silas Wright, Jr. (D-NY)	January 4, 1833	
40	Samuel Lewis Southard (AJ-NJ)	March 4, 1833	Former senator
41	Joseph Kent (AJ-MD)	March 4, 1833	Former representative (10 years)
42	Samuel McKean (J-PA)	March 4, 1833	Former representative (6 years)
43	Benjamin Swift (AJ-VT)	March 4, 1833	Former representative (4 years)
44	Nathaniel Pitcher Tallmadge (J-NY)	March 4, 1833	New York 1st in population (1830)
45	Thomas Morris (J-OH)	March 4, 1833	Ohio 4th in population (1830)
46	Ether Shepley (J-ME)	March 4, 1833	Maine 12th in population (1830)
47	Nathan Smith (AJ-CT)	March 4, 1833	Connecticut 16th in population (1830)
	Lewis Fields Linn (J-MO)	October 25, 1833	
	John Pendleton King (J-GA)	November 21, 1833	
48	William Campbell Preston (N-SC)	November 26, 1833	
	Alexander Porter (AJ-LA)	December 19, 1833	
	Benjamin Watkins Leigh (AJ-VA)	February 26, 1834	
	James Buchanan (D-PA)	December 6, 1834	
	Robert Henry Goldsborough (AJ-MD)	January 13, 1835	
	John Ruggles (J-ME)	January 20, 1835	

== See also ==
- 23rd United States Congress
- List of United States representatives in the 23rd Congress
