= Rufus McIntire =

American politician

Member of the U.S. House of Representatives from Maine's 1st district
- In office September 10, 1827 – July 2, 1835
- Preceded by: William Burleigh
- Succeeded by: John Fairfield

Personal details
- Born: December 19, 1784 York, Massachusetts, US (now Maine)
- Died: April 28, 1866 (aged 81) Parsonsfield, Maine, US
- Party: Jacksonian Party
- Education: Dartmouth College, 1809
- Profession: Politician, Lawyer, captain, land surveyor
- Known for: War of 1812, Congressional Service, Aroostook War
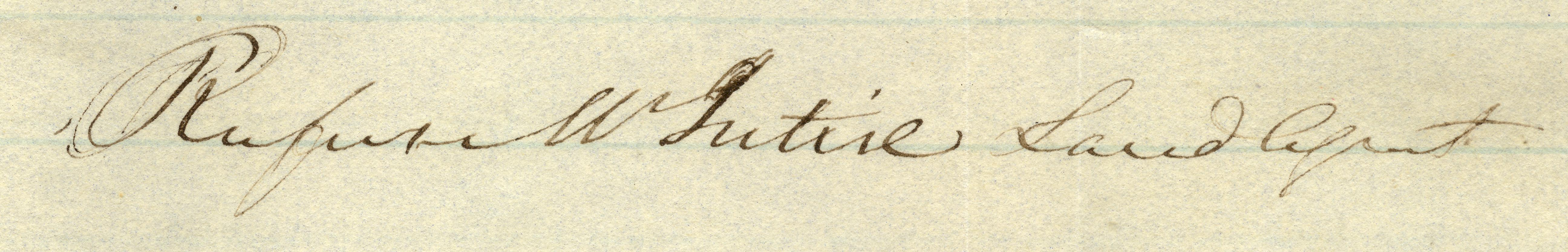
- Signature

Rufus McIntire (December 19, 1784 – April 28, 1866) was a United States lawyer, captain of U.S. Army artillery in the War of 1812, congressman, U.S. Marshal, land agent and hostage/prisoner in the Aroostook War.

== Biography ==
=== Early life ===
Rufus McIntire was born on December 19, 1784, at York, Massachusetts (now in Maine). He attended Berwick Academy and was graduated from Dartmouth College in 1809. After graduation, he read law for three years with John Holmes of Alfred, Maine.

== Career ==
Rufus McIntire was admitted to the York County Bar Association in 1812, but when the war with Great Britain intervened, he was commissioned as a captain of a United States Army artillery company (3rd Regiment) during the War of 1812. McIntire's troops were deployed in northern New York State and Canada and were engaged in significant battles at Sackets Harbor, Crysler's Farm and Fort Oswego.

He was a voting member in the Brunswick Convention of 1816. In 1820, the year Maine acquired statehood, he was elected to the Maine House of Representatives. In early 1827, he and ex-governor William King were named Maine's members of the commission to establish the boundary with New Hampshire. Later that year, he was elected a United States congressman to replace the deceased William Burleigh in the Twentieth United States Congress. He served thereafter in the Twenty-first, Twenty-second, and Twenty-third U.S. Congresses from September 10, 1827, through 1835.

In 1837, McIntire was a candidate for the Democratic party's nomination for governor; but at the state convention, he finished second to Gorham Parks by a vote of 137 to 167.

McIntire served as the State Land Agent in 1839 and 1840. Because the boundary between Maine and New Brunswick remained unsettled, he was sent with a posse of militiamen into the disputed Aroostook territory to combat the intrusion of Canadian lumbering operations. On the night of February 12, 1839, McIntire's cabin was surrounded by armed Canadians, who took him prisoner and transported him to jail in Fredericton. The incident led to the activation of large militia forces in both Maine and New Brunswick in the affair which became known as the Aroostook War.

McIntire was appointed as United States Marshal for Maine in January 1849 by Democratic President James K. Polk; but shortly after the Whig Zachary Taylor was inaugurated in March of that year, McIntire was removed from the office. He was later appointed Surveyor of Customs in Portland, Maine by President Franklin Pierce, in which position he served from 1853 through 1857.

Rufus McIntire died at the age of 82 in Parsonsfield, Maine on April 28, 1866.

== Philosophical and/or political views ==
Like his legal mentor John Holmes, Rufus McIntire was a committed Jeffersonian in his early years. In his first congressional campaign, he ran on the Adams (Anti-Jackson) ticket; but in succeeding terms he ran and served as a stalwart Jacksonian Democrat.

== Marriage and family ==
Rufus McIntire married Nancy Rolfe Hannaford in 1819. They had eight children, three of whom died in infancy. After Nancy's death on February 2, 1830, Rufus married her sister, Mary B. Hannaford in 1832. They had two children.

== See also ==
- Aroostook War

== Notes ==
U.S. House of Representatives
Preceded by William Burleigh	Member of the U.S. House of Representatives from Maine's 1st congressional district September 10, 1827 - March 3, 1835	Succeeded by John Fairfield
