= Richard H. Vose =

American politician (1803–1864)

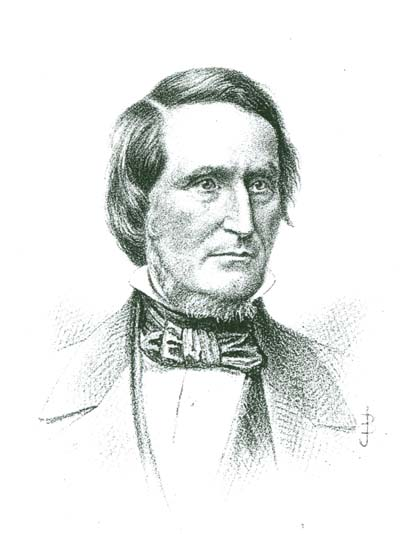
- From 1870's The History of Augusta, from the Earliest Settlement to the Present Time

14th Governor of Maine
- In office January 12, 1841 – January 13, 1841
- Preceded by: John Fairfield
- Succeeded by: Edward Kent

Member of the Maine House of Representatives
- In office 1824; 1835; 1838–1839

Personal details
- Born: November 8, 1803 Northfield, Massachusetts, US
- Died: January 19, 1864 (aged 60)
- Party: Whig
- Education: Bowdoin College

Richard Hampton Vose (November 8, 1803 – January 19, 1864) was an American politician and the 14th governor of Maine for one day in 1841. This makes Vose the shortest serving state governor in American history.

== Early life ==
Vose was born in Northfield, Massachusetts, on November 8, 1803, and was graduated from Bowdoin College in 1822.

== Career ==
Vose served as a member of the Maine House of Representatives in 1824, 1835, 1838 and 1839. He was a member of the Maine State Senate from 1840 to 1841. In 1841, he was Senate President. John Fairfield, Governor of Maine at the time, resigned on January 12, 1841, after having been elected to the United States Senate to fill the term of Sen. Reuel Williams who had also resigned. As Senate President, Vose filled Fairfield's unexpired term. He served as Governor of Maine from January 12, 1841, to January 13, 1841. Edward Kent became the governor on January 13, 1841. He returned to his original position and finished his term. He was known for “his confiding nature and sanguine temperament”.

== Death ==
He died on January 19, 1864.

== Sources ==
- Sobel, Robert and John Raimo. Biographical Directory of the Governors of the United States, 1789-1978. Greenwood Press, 1988. ISBN 0-313-28093-2
- “Richard H. Vose” Friends of the Blaine House at http://blainehouse.org/governors/Richard_H_Vose.htm

Political offices
Preceded by John Fairfield	Governor of Maine; 1841	Succeeded by Edward Kent
