= Gorham Parks =

American politician (1794–1877)

Member of the U.S. House of Representatives from Maine's 8th district
- In office March 4, 1833 – March 3, 1837
- Preceded by: New district
- Succeeded by: Thomas Davee

Personal details
- Born: May 27, 1794 Westfield, Massachusetts, U.S.
- Died: November 23, 1877 (aged 83) New York City, U.S.
- Resting place: Green-Wood Cemetery, New York City, U.S.
- Party: Democratic
- Other political affiliations: Jacksonian
- Education: Harvard University
- Occupation: Politician, lawyer

Gorham Parks (May 27, 1794 – November 23, 1877) was a U.S. Representative from Maine, and a Democratic Party candidate for Maine Governor.

Born in Westfield, Massachusetts, Parks attended the common schools and graduated from Harvard University in 1813, where he studied law. He was admitted to the bar in 1819 and began his practice in Bangor, Maine in 1823.

Parks was elected as a Jacksonian to the Twenty-third and Twenty-fourth United States Congresses (March 4, 1833 – March 3, 1837). He was a local leader of the Loco-foco or radical faction of the Democratic Party, which was anti-bank, anti-paper money, and anti-monopoly. He was opposed locally by Bangor's "Bank Junto", or conservative Democrats, which included Samuel Veazie, William Emerson, John Hodgdon, and Thomas A. Hill.

In 1837 Parks was the Democratic candidate for Maine governor. The election was unusual in that Parks' opponent, Edward Kent of the Whig Party, lived in the same city (Bangor) and both were Harvard graduates. In one of the closest gubernatorial races in Maine history, Parks lost by less than a thousand votes (with about 70,000 cast).

Parks was subsequently appointed United States Marshal for the District of Maine (1838–1841), and then United States Attorney for Maine (1843–1845). He ended his political career as United States Consul at Rio de Janeiro, Brazil, (1845–1849), a post later occupied by his former opponent Edward Kent

Parks died in Bay Ridge, New York, November 23, 1877, and was interred in Green-Wood Cemetery, Brooklyn. His son, also Gorham Parks, became Clerk of the New York Court of Appeals, and died in Albany in 1897.

Party political offices
Preceded by Robert P. Dunlap	Democratic nominee for Governor of Maine; 1837	Succeeded by John Fairfield
U.S. House of Representatives
Preceded by New district	Member of the U.S. House of Representatives from Maine's 8th congressional district March 4, 1833 – March 3, 1837	Succeeded by Thomas Davee
