= Jonas Wheeler =

American politician (1789–1826)

Member of the Maine Senate from the Knox County district
- In office 1825–1826

Personal details
- Born: February 9, 1789 Concord, Massachusetts
- Died: May 1, 1826 (aged 37)
- Party: Democratic-Republican
- Profession: Lawyer

Jonas Wheeler (February 9, 1789 – May 1, 1826) was an American politician and lawyer. Born in Concord, Massachusetts, Wheeler graduated from Harvard College in 1810. He served as Justice of the Peace, the first representative of Camden, Maine to the Maine House of Representatives and Camden's State Senator. He was the President of the Maine Senate from 1825 until his death in May 1826.
