= John Fairfield =

American politician

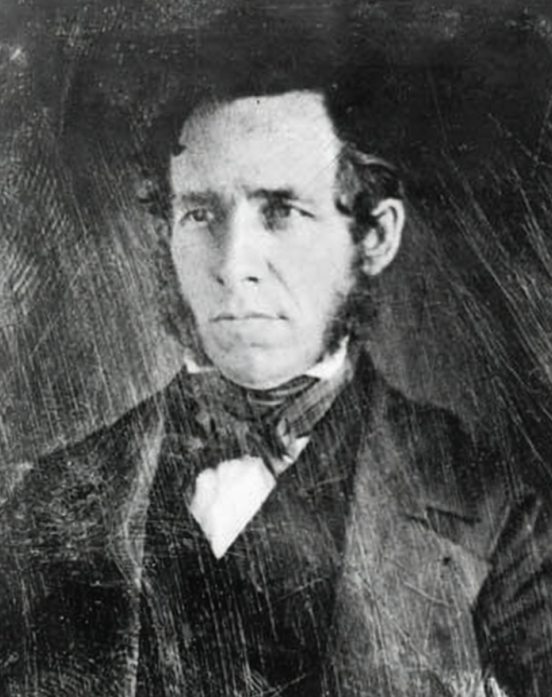

United States Senator from Maine
- In office December 4, 1843 – December 24, 1847
- Preceded by: Reuel Williams
- Succeeded by: Wyman B. S. Moor

13th & 16th Governor of Maine
- In office January 5, 1842 – March 7, 1843
- Preceded by: Edward Kent
- Succeeded by: Edward Kavanagh
- In office January 2, 1839 – January 12, 1841
- Preceded by: Edward Kent
- Succeeded by: Richard H. Vose

Member of the U.S. House of Representatives from Maine's 1st district
- In office March 4, 1835 – December 24, 1838
- Preceded by: Rufus McIntire
- Succeeded by: Nathan Clifford

Personal details
- Born: January 30, 1797 Pepperellborough, Massachusetts (now Saco, Maine)
- Died: December 24, 1847 (aged 50) Washington, D.C.
- Resting place: Laurel Hill Cemetery, Saco, Maine
- Party: Democratic
- Spouse: Anna Paine Thornton (m. 1825-1847, his death)
- Children: 9
- Occupation: Attorney

John Fairfield (January 30, 1797 – December 24, 1847) was an attorney and Democrat politician from Maine. He served as a U.S. representative, as the 13th and 16th governor of Maine, and as a U.S. senator.

Fairfield was born in Pepperellborough, Massachusetts (now Saco, Maine) and attended the schools of York County. After serving in the War of 1812, he pursued a business caree, then decided to become an attorney. He "read law" in the office of an established lawyer and judge, and was admitted to the bar in 1826. He practiced in Saco and Biddeford, and became active in politics as a Democrat.

He was elected US Representative in 1834, and re-elected in 1836, and served from 1835 until 1838, when he was elected governor. He served as governor from 1839 to 1841. He was again elected governor in 1842, and served until 1843, when he resigned to accept election as US Senator to a vacant seat, and served until his death.

Fairfield died in Washington, D.C., and was buried at Laurel Hill Cemetery in Saco.

== Early life ==
Fairfield was born in Pepperellborough, Massachusetts (now Saco, Maine), and was the eldest of six children born to Ichabod and Sarah (Nason) Fairfield. He attended the Saco schools, Thornton Academy, and Limerick Academy. Fairfield is known to have served on the crew of a privateer during the War of 1812, which led to the nickname "Sailor Boy", but the exact circumstances of his wartime service are not known. After completing his education, Fairfield began a career as a merchant before deciding to pursue a legal career. He studied law in the office of attorney and judge Ether Shepley, and was admitted to the bar in 1826.

== Start of career ==
Fairfield practiced Saco and Biddeford in partnership with George Thacher, and specialized in courtroom pleadings and trials. Fairfield was appointed a trustee of Thornton Academy in 1826 and served as president of the board from 1845 to 1847. He was appointed Reporter of Decisions for the Maine Supreme Judicial Court in 1832, and authored Supreme Court Reports, published in Augusta between 1835 and 1837. In 1845, Bowdoin College awarded Fairfield the honorary degree of Master of Arts.

== Congressman ==
In 1834 he was elected to the United States House of Representatives as a Democrat. He was reelected in 1836, and served from March 4, 1835, to December 24, 1838, when he resigned to begin his first term as governor. During his time in the House, Fairfield became nationally known when he spoke in the House to demand an investigation into the duel between Representatives Jonathan Cilley and William J. Graves, which resulted in Cilley's death. In insisting on an investigation, Fairfield broke with the custom of the time, largely favored by pro-slavery Southern members, of not referring to private "affairs of honor" on the House floor. Fairfield's efforts resulted in passage of a law making it illegal to issue a dueling challenge within the city limits of Washington, D.C., even if the duel was planned for a site outside the city.

== Governor ==
Fairfield was the Governor of Maine from 1838 to 1841. He returned to office again in 1842, and served until resigning in 1843. During Fairfield's governorship, the Aroostook War erupted as the U.S. and Great Britain continued a dispute over the boundary between Maine and New Brunswick, Canada. Both sides dispatched militia to the contested area and several Canadian militiamen were captured. No one was killed, but two Canadians were injured by bears prior to the enactment of the Webster–Ashburton Treaty that ended the dispute.

== U.S. Senator ==
He resigned during his second tenure as governor to accept election as US Senator, filling the vacancy caused by the resignation of Reuel Williams. He was re-elected to a full term in 1845, and served from March 7, 1843, until his death. Fairfield was chairman of the Committee on Naval Affairs in the 29th and 30th Congresses. At the 1844 Democratic National Convention, Fairfield's name was placed in nomination for vice president after Silas Wright declined; He received the most votes on the second ballot, but on the third ballot the nomination went to George M. Dallas.

== Death and burial ==
Fairfield died suddenly in Washington, D.C., on December 24, 1847. According to published reports, Fairfield suffered from knee pain, and had been operated on previously. When he sought treatment on this occasion, his doctor punctured the skin around his knees to drain built-up fluid, then injected a copper sulfate solution, which was thought at the time to provide relief of the pain and swelling associated with rheumatism. The doctor did not remove the solution before it was absorbed into Fairfield's circulatory system, and intense pain, paralysis and death resulted.

Fairfield's funeral was held at Saco's Congregational Church on December 1, 1848. He was buried at Laurel Hill Cemetery in Saco.

== Family ==
On September 25, 1825, Fairfield married Anna Paine Thornton, the daughter of Dr. Thomas G. Thornton, a former U.S. Marshal for Maine and a niece of Richard Cutts and Anna Paine Cutts. They were the parents of nine children, and Mrs. Fairfield died on July 18, 1882.

== Legacy ==
John Fairfield is the namesake of the town of Fort Fairfield, Maine. In 1962, the Saco school district constructed an elementary school which was named for him.

== See also ==
- List of members of the United States Congress who died in office (1790–1899)

== Sources ==
=== Books ===
- General Catalogue of Bowdoin College. Brunswick, ME: Bowdoin College. 1864.
- Chase, Henry (1893). Representative Men of Maine. Portland, ME: Lakeside Press.
- Fairfield, John (1922). Staples, Arthur G. (ed.). The Letters of John Fairfield. Lewiston, ME: Lewiston Journal Company.
- Gannett, Henry (1905). The Origin of Certain Place Names in the United States. Govt. Print. Off. p. 129.
- Spencer, Thomas C. (1998). Where They're Buried. Baltimore, MD: Clearfield Company. p. 415. ISBN 978-0-8063-4823-0.
- Proceedings of the Massachusetts Historical Society. Vol. 66. Boston, MA: Massachusetts Historical Society. 1942.

=== Internet ===
- Comprehensive Plan Update Committee (2011). "City of Saco, Maine Comprehensive Plan, 2011 Update". University of Maine. Orono, ME: Raymond H. Fogler Library.
- "Board of Trustees, Appointed 1812=1889". Thornton Academy.org. Saco, ME: Thornton Academy.
- "The High Comedy of the Bloodless Aroostook War". Newenglandhistoricalsociety.com. Stonington, ME: New England Historical Society. 2018.

Party political offices
Preceded by Gorham Parks	Democratic nominee for Governor of Maine; 1838, 1839, 1840, 1841, 1842	Succeeded by Hugh J. Anderson
U.S. House of Representatives
Preceded by Rufus McIntire	Member of the U.S. House of Representatives from Maine's 1st congressional district 1835–1838	Succeeded by Nathan Clifford
Political offices
Preceded by Edward Kent	Governor of Maine; 1839–1841	Succeeded by Edward Kent
Preceded by Edward Kent	Governor of Maine; 1842–1843	Succeeded by Edward Kavanagh
U.S. Senate
Preceded by Reuel Williams	U.S. senator (Class 1) from Maine; 1843–1847; Served alongside: George Evans, James W. Bradbury	Succeeded by Wyman B. S. Moor
