= Maine's 8th congressional district =

Former U.S. district

- Obsolete district
- Created: 1830
- Eliminated: 1840
- Years active: 1833-1843

Maine's 8th congressional district is a former congressional district in Maine. It was created in 1833 and was eliminated in 1843. Its last congressman was Elisha Hunt Allen.

== List of members representing the district ==
Representative	Party	Years	Cong ress	Electoral history
District created March 4, 1833
Gorham Parks (Bangor)	Jacksonian	March 4, 1833 – March 3, 1837	23rd 24th	Elected in 1833. Re-elected in 1834. Retired to run for governor.
Thomas Davee (Blanchard)	Democratic	March 4, 1837 – March 3, 1841	25th 26th	Elected in 1836 on the second ballot. Re-elected in 1838. Retired.
Elisha Hunt Allen (Bangor)	Whig	March 4, 1841 – March 3, 1843	27th	Elected in 1840. Redistricted to the 6th district and lost re-election.
District eliminated March 3, 1843
