= Edward Kent =

American judge (1802–1877)

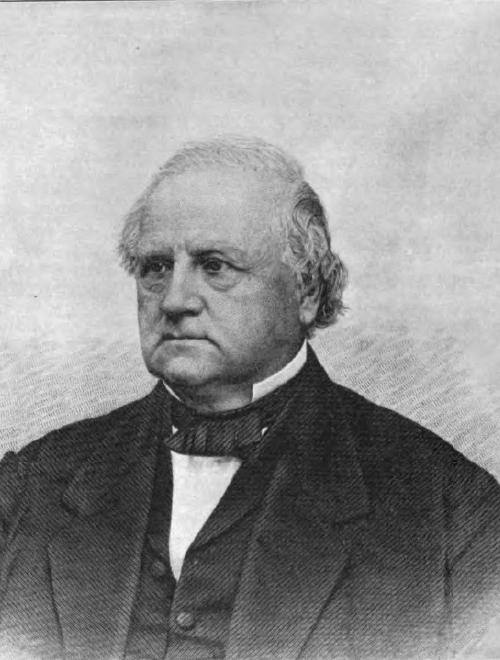

Associate Justice of the Maine Supreme Judicial Court
- In office 1859–1873

12th & 15th Governor of Maine
- In office January 13, 1841 – January 5, 1842
- Preceded by: Richard H. Vose
- Succeeded by: John Fairfield
- In office January 19, 1838 – January 2, 1839
- Preceded by: Robert P. Dunlap
- Succeeded by: John Fairfield

2nd Mayor of Bangor, Maine
- In office 1836–1837
- Preceded by: Allen Gilman
- Succeeded by: Rufus Dwinel

Member of the Maine Senate
- In office 1831–1833

Personal details
- Born: January 8, 1802 Concord, New Hampshire, U.S.
- Died: May 19, 1877 (aged 75) Bangor, Maine, U.S.
- Resting place: Mount Auburn Cemetery in Cambridge, Massachusetts.
- Party: Whig

Edward Kent (January 8, 1802 – May 19, 1877) was an American attorney and politician who served as the 12th and 15th governor of Maine. He was among the last prominent members of the Whig Party in Maine before it collapsed in favor of the Republicans. He was elected to two non-consecutive terms (1838–39 and 1841–42), though his second term was through direct appointment by the Whig-dominated Maine Legislature.

== Early life and education ==
Born in 1802 in Concord, New Hampshire, Kent was raised in Bangor, Maine. He graduated from Harvard University in 1821, in the same class as Ralph Waldo Emerson.

== Career ==
He apprenticed as a lawyer in Topsham, Maine, but established his own practice in the growing lumber-port of Bangor in 1825. He was elected to the Maine Legislature in 1829 and held political offices on and off the rest of his life, becoming the second mayor of Bangor (1836–1837) and governor of Maine.

Kent went into practice with Jonas Cutting in 1831 and their partnership lasted 18 years. The two constructed the Jonas Cutting–Edward Kent House in Bangor's Broadway neighborhood, which is listed on the National Register of Historic Places as an example of the Greek Revival style.

Kent ended his public life as an associate justice of the Maine Supreme Judicial Court (1859–73). His law partner and neighbor Jonas Cutting served almost concurrently in the same position (1854–75). Kent's uncle Prentiss Mellen had been the first chief justice of the same court.

Kent played a part in both instigating and resolving the Aroostook War.

== Personal life ==
While living in Rio de Janeiro, his wife and two children died of yellow fever. His surviving child died soon after they returned to Bangor. Kent married a second time, to Abigail Ann Rockwood who was the niece of first wife Sarah Johnston, and had one more child, Edward Kent Jr., who became the chief justice of the Arizona Territory Supreme Court.

He died of congestive heart failure in 1877 in Bangor, Maine, and is buried at the Mount Auburn Cemetery in Cambridge, Massachusetts.

=== Legacy ===
Fort Kent, situated where the Fish River meets the Saint John River in the Saint John River Valley, was named in his honor. Later, the town of Fort Kent, Maine was named for the military installation (of which only a single blockhouse survives) and for Governor Kent.

== See also ==
- List of mayors of Bangor, Maine

Party political offices
Preceded by William Kent	Whig nominee for Governor of Maine; 1836, 1837, 1838, 1839, 1840, 1841	Succeeded by Edward Robinson
Political offices
Preceded by Robert P. Dunlap	12th Governor of Maine; 1838–1839	Succeeded by John Fairfield
Preceded by John Fairfield	15th Governor of Maine; 1841–1842	Succeeded by John Fairfield
Preceded by Allen Gilman	2nd Mayor of Bangor, Maine; 1836–1837	Succeeded by Rufus Dwinel
Legal offices
Preceded by Joshua W. Hathaway	Associate Justice of the Maine Supreme Judicial Court; 1859–1873	Succeeded by John A. Peters
