= Maine's congressional delegations =

Since Maine became a U.S. State in 1820 it has sent congressional delegations to the United States Senate and United States House of Representatives, beginning with the 17th United States Congress. Each state elects two senators to serve for six years, and members of the House to two-year terms. Each state elects two senators to serve for six years in general elections, with their re-election staggered. Prior to the ratification of the Seventeenth Amendment in 1913, senators were elected by the Maine Legislature. Each state elects varying numbers of members of the House, depending on population, to two-year terms. Maine has sent two members to the House in each congressional delegation since the 1960 United States census.

The current dean, or longest-serving member, of the Maine delegation is Senator Susan Collins, having served in the Senate since 1997.

== U.S. Senate ==
Current U.S. senators from Maine
Maine CPVI (2025): D+4	Class I senator	Class II senator
Maine CPVI (2025): D+4	Angus King (Junior senator) (Brunswick)	Susan Collins (Senior senator) (Bangor)
Party	Independent	Republican
Incumbent since	January 3, 2013	January 3, 1997

Class I	Congress	Class II
John Holmes (DR)	16th (1819–1821)	John Chandler (DR)
John Holmes (DR)	17th (1821–1823)	John Chandler (DR)
John Holmes (DR)	18th (1823–1825)	John Chandler (DR)
John Holmes (NR)	19th (1825–1827)	John Chandler (J)
Albion Parris (J)	20th (1827–1829)	John Chandler (J)
John Holmes (NR)	20th (1827–1829)	John Chandler (J)
John Holmes (NR)	21st (1829–1831)	Peleg Sprague (NR)
John Holmes (NR)	22nd (1831–1833)	Peleg Sprague (NR)
Ether Shepley (J)	23rd (1833–1835)	Peleg Sprague (NR)
Ether Shepley (J)	23rd (1833–1835)	John Ruggles (J)
Ether Shepley (J)	24th (1835–1837)	John Ruggles (J)
Judah Dana (J)	24th (1835–1837)	John Ruggles (J)
Reuel Williams (D)	25th (1837–1839)	John Ruggles (D)
Reuel Williams (D)	26th (1839–1841)	John Ruggles (D)
Reuel Williams (D)	27th (1841–1843)	George Evans (W)
John Fairfield (D)	28th (1843–1845)	George Evans (W)
John Fairfield (D)	29th (1845–1847)	George Evans (W)
John Fairfield (D)	30th (1847–1849)	James W. Bradbury (D)
Wyman B. S. Moor (D)	30th (1847–1849)	James W. Bradbury (D)
Hannibal Hamlin (D)	30th (1847–1849)	James W. Bradbury (D)
Hannibal Hamlin (D)	31st (1849–1851)	James W. Bradbury (D)
Hannibal Hamlin (D)	32nd (1851–1853)	James W. Bradbury (D)
Hannibal Hamlin (D)	33rd (1853–1855)	William P. Fessenden (W)
Hannibal Hamlin (D)	34th (1855–1857)	William P. Fessenden (W)
Amos Nourse (R)	34th (1855–1857)	William P. Fessenden (W)
Hannibal Hamlin (R)	35th (1857–1859)	William P. Fessenden (R)
Hannibal Hamlin (R)	36th (1859–1861)	William P. Fessenden (R)
Lot M. Morrill (R)	36th (1859–1861)	William P. Fessenden (R)
Lot M. Morrill (R)	37th (1861–1863)	William P. Fessenden (R)
Lot M. Morrill (R)	38th (1863–1865)	William P. Fessenden (R)
Lot M. Morrill (R)	38th (1863–1865)	Nathan A. Farwell (R)
Lot M. Morrill (R)	39th (1865–1867)	William P. Fessenden (R)
Lot M. Morrill (R)	40th (1867–1869)	William P. Fessenden (R)
Hannibal Hamlin (R)	41st (1869–1871)	William P. Fessenden (R)
Hannibal Hamlin (R)	41st (1869–1871)	Lot M. Morrill (R)
Hannibal Hamlin (R)	42nd (1871–1873)	Lot M. Morrill (R)
Hannibal Hamlin (R)	43rd (1873–1875)	Lot M. Morrill (R)
Hannibal Hamlin (R)	44th (1875–1877)	Lot M. Morrill (R)
Hannibal Hamlin (R)	44th (1875–1877)	James G. Blaine (R)
Hannibal Hamlin (R)	45th (1877–1879)	James G. Blaine (R)
Hannibal Hamlin (R)	46th (1879–1881)	James G. Blaine (R)
Eugene Hale (R)	47th (1881–1883)	James G. Blaine (R)
Eugene Hale (R)	47th (1881–1883)	William P. Frye (R)
Eugene Hale (R)	48th (1883–1885)	William P. Frye (R)
Eugene Hale (R)	49th (1885–1887)	William P. Frye (R)
Eugene Hale (R)	50th (1887–1889)	William P. Frye (R)
Eugene Hale (R)	51st (1889–1891)	William P. Frye (R)
Eugene Hale (R)	52nd (1891–1893)	William P. Frye (R)
Eugene Hale (R)	53rd (1893–1895)	William P. Frye (R)
Eugene Hale (R)	54th (1895–1897)	William P. Frye (R)
Eugene Hale (R)	55th (1897–1899)	William P. Frye (R)
Eugene Hale (R)	56th (1899–1901)	William P. Frye (R)
Eugene Hale (R)	57th (1901–1903)	William P. Frye (R)
Eugene Hale (R)	58th (1903–1905)	William P. Frye (R)
Eugene Hale (R)	59th (1905–1907)	William P. Frye (R)
Eugene Hale (R)	60th (1907–1909)	William P. Frye (R)
Eugene Hale (R)	61st (1909–1911)	William P. Frye (R)
Charles F. Johnson (D)	62nd (1911–1913)	William P. Frye (R)
Charles F. Johnson (D)	62nd (1911–1913)	Obadiah Gardner (D)
Charles F. Johnson (D)	63rd (1913–1915)	Edwin C. Burleigh (R)
Charles F. Johnson (D)	64th (1915–1917)	Edwin C. Burleigh (R)
Charles F. Johnson (D)	64th (1915–1917)	Bert M. Fernald (R)
Frederick Hale (R)	65th (1917–1919)	Bert M. Fernald (R)
Frederick Hale (R)	66th (1919–1921)	Bert M. Fernald (R)
Frederick Hale (R)	67th (1921–1923)	Bert M. Fernald (R)
Frederick Hale (R)	68th (1923–1925)	Bert M. Fernald (R)
Frederick Hale (R)	69th (1925–1927)	Bert M. Fernald (R)
Frederick Hale (R)	69th (1925–1927)	Arthur R. Gould (R)
Frederick Hale (R)	70th (1927–1929)	Arthur R. Gould (R)
Frederick Hale (R)	71st (1929–1931)	Arthur R. Gould (R)
Frederick Hale (R)	72nd (1931–1933)	Wallace H. White (R)
Frederick Hale (R)	73rd (1933–1935)	Wallace H. White (R)
Frederick Hale (R)	74th (1935–1937)	Wallace H. White (R)
Frederick Hale (R)	75th (1937–1939)	Wallace H. White (R)
Frederick Hale (R)	76th (1939–1941)	Wallace H. White (R)
Owen Brewster (R)	77th (1941–1943)	Wallace H. White (R)
Owen Brewster (R)	78th (1943–1945)	Wallace H. White (R)
Owen Brewster (R)	79th (1945–1947)	Wallace H. White (R)
Owen Brewster (R)	80th (1947–1949)	Wallace H. White (R)
Owen Brewster (R)	81st (1949–1951)	Margaret Chase Smith (R)
Owen Brewster (R)	82nd (1951–1953)	Margaret Chase Smith (R)
Frederick G. Payne (R)	83rd (1953–1955)	Margaret Chase Smith (R)
Frederick G. Payne (R)	84th (1955–1957)	Margaret Chase Smith (R)
Frederick G. Payne (R)	85th (1957–1959)	Margaret Chase Smith (R)
Edmund Muskie (D)	86th (1959–1961)	Margaret Chase Smith (R)
Edmund Muskie (D)	87th (1961–1963)	Margaret Chase Smith (R)
Edmund Muskie (D)	88th (1963–1965)	Margaret Chase Smith (R)
Edmund Muskie (D)	89th (1965–1967)	Margaret Chase Smith (R)
Edmund Muskie (D)	90th (1967–1969)	Margaret Chase Smith (R)
Edmund Muskie (D)	91st (1969–1971)	Margaret Chase Smith (R)
Edmund Muskie (D)	92nd (1971–1973)	Margaret Chase Smith (R)
Edmund Muskie (D)	93rd (1973–1975)	William Hathaway (D)
Edmund Muskie (D)	94th (1975–1977)	William Hathaway (D)
Edmund Muskie (D)	95th (1977–1979)	William Hathaway (D)
Edmund Muskie (D)	96th (1979–1981)	William Cohen (R)
George J. Mitchell (D)	96th (1979–1981)	William Cohen (R)
George J. Mitchell (D)	97th (1981–1983)	William Cohen (R)
George J. Mitchell (D)	98th (1983–1985)	William Cohen (R)
George J. Mitchell (D)	99th (1985–1987)	William Cohen (R)
George J. Mitchell (D)	100th (1987–1989)	William Cohen (R)
George J. Mitchell (D)	101st (1989–1991)	William Cohen (R)
George J. Mitchell (D)	102nd (1991–1993)	William Cohen (R)
George J. Mitchell (D)	103rd (1993–1995)	William Cohen (R)
Olympia Snowe (R)	104th (1995–1997)	William Cohen (R)
Olympia Snowe (R)	105th (1997–1999)	Susan Collins (R)
Olympia Snowe (R)	106th (1999–2001)	Susan Collins (R)
Olympia Snowe (R)	107th (2001–2003)	Susan Collins (R)
Olympia Snowe (R)	108th (2003–2005)	Susan Collins (R)
Olympia Snowe (R)	109th (2005–2007)	Susan Collins (R)
Olympia Snowe (R)	110th (2007–2009)	Susan Collins (R)
Olympia Snowe (R)	111th (2009–2011)	Susan Collins (R)
Olympia Snowe (R)	112th (2011–2013)	Susan Collins (R)
Angus King (ID)	113th (2013–2015)	Susan Collins (R)
Angus King (ID)	114th (2015–2017)	Susan Collins (R)
Angus King (ID)	115th (2017–2019)	Susan Collins (R)
Angus King (ID)	116th (2019–2021)	Susan Collins (R)
Angus King (ID)	117th (2021–2023)	Susan Collins (R)
Angus King (ID)	118th (2023–2025)	Susan Collins (R)
Angus King (ID)	119th (2025–2027)	Susan Collins (R)
Angus King (ID)	120th (2027–2029)	Troy Jackson (D)

== U.S. House of Representatives ==
=== Current members ===
Current U.S. representatives from Maine
District	Member (Residence)	Party	Incumbent since	CPVI (2025)	District map
1st	Chellie Pingree (North Haven)	Democratic	January 3, 2009	D+11	
2nd	Jared Golden (Lewiston)	Democratic	January 3, 2019	R+4	

=== Historical delegations ===
==== 1819–1821: 1 seat ====
Congress	At-large seat
16th (1819–1821)	Joseph Dane (F)

==== 1821–1833: 7 seats ====
Congress	District						
Congress	1st	2nd	3rd	4th	5th	6th	7th
17th (1821–1823)	Joseph Dane (F)	Ezekiel Whitman (F)	Mark Langdon Hill (DR)	William D. Williamson (DR)	Ebenezer Herrick (DR)	Joshua Cushman (DR)	Enoch Lincoln (DR)
17th (1821–1823)	Joseph Dane (F)	Mark Harris (DR)	Mark Langdon Hill (DR)	William D. Williamson (DR)	Ebenezer Herrick (DR)	Joshua Cushman (DR)	Enoch Lincoln (DR)
18th (1823–1825)	William Burleigh (DR) (Note: Supported the Adams-Clay faction in the 1824 United States presidential election.)	Stephen; Longfellow (F)	Ebenezer Herrick (DR)	Joshua; Cushman (DR)	Enoch Lincoln (DR)	Jeremiah; O'Brien (DR)	David Kidder (DR)
19th (1825–1827)	William Burleigh (NR)	John Anderson (J)	Ebenezer Herrick (NR)	Peleg Sprague (NR)	Enoch Lincoln (NR)	Jeremiah O'Brien (NR)	David Kidder (NR)
19th (1825–1827)	William Burleigh (NR)	John Anderson (J)	Ebenezer Herrick (NR)	Peleg Sprague (NR)	James W. Ripley (J)	Jeremiah O'Brien (NR)	David Kidder (NR)
20th (1827–1829)	William Burleigh (NR)	John Anderson (J)	Joseph F. Wingate (NR)	Peleg Sprague (NR)	James W. Ripley (J)	Jeremiah O'Brien (NR)	Samuel Butman (NR)
20th (1827–1829)	Rufus McIntire (J)	John Anderson (J)	Joseph F. Wingate (NR)	Peleg Sprague (NR)	James W. Ripley (J)	Jeremiah O'Brien (NR)	Samuel Butman (NR)
21st (1829–1831)	Rufus McIntire (J)	John Anderson (J)	Joseph F. Wingate (NR)	George Evans (NR)	James W. Ripley (J)	Leonard Jarvis (J)	Samuel Butman (NR)
21st (1829–1831)	Rufus McIntire (J)	John Anderson (J)	Joseph F. Wingate (NR)	George Evans (NR)	Cornelius Holland (J)	Leonard Jarvis (J)	Samuel Butman (NR)
22nd (1831–1833)	Rufus McIntire (J)	John Anderson (J)	Edward Kavanagh (J)	George Evans (NR)	Cornelius Holland (J)	Leonard Jarvis (J)	James Bates (J)

==== 1833–1843: 8 seats ====
Congress	District							
Congress	1st	2nd	3rd	4th	5th	6th	7th	8th
23rd (1833–1835)	Rufus McIntire (J)	Francis Ormand; Jonathan Smith (J)	Edward Kavanagh (J)	George Evans (NR)	Moses Mason Jr. (J)	Joseph Hall (J)	Leonard Jarvis (J)	Gorham Parks (J)
24th (1835–1837)	John Fairfield (J)	Francis Ormand; Jonathan Smith (J)	Jeremiah Bailey (NR)	George Evans (NR)	Moses Mason Jr. (J)	Joseph Hall (J)	Leonard Jarvis (J)	Gorham Parks (J)
25th (1837–1839)	John Fairfield (D)	Francis Ormand; Jonathan Smith (D)	Jonathan Cilley (D)	George Evans (W)	Timothy J. Carter (D)	Hugh J. Anderson (D)	Joseph C. Noyes (W)	Thomas Davee (D)
25th (1837–1839)	John Fairfield (D)	Francis Ormand; Jonathan Smith (D)	Edward Robinson (W)	George Evans (W)	Virgil D. Parris (D)	Hugh J. Anderson (D)	Joseph C. Noyes (W)	Thomas Davee (D)
26th (1839–1841)	Nathan Clifford (D)	Albert Smith (D)	Benjamin Randall (W)	George Evans (W)	Virgil D. Parris (D)	Hugh J. Anderson (D)	Joshua A. Lowell (D)	Thomas Davee (D)
27th (1841–1843)	Nathan Clifford (D)	William P. Fessenden (W)	Benjamin Randall (W)	George Evans (W)	Nathaniel Littlefield (D)	Alfred Marshall (D)	Joshua A. Lowell (D)	Elisha H. Allen (W)
27th (1841–1843)	Nathan Clifford (D)	William P. Fessenden (W)	Benjamin Randall (W)	David Bronson (W)	Nathaniel Littlefield (D)	Alfred Marshall (D)	Joshua A. Lowell (D)	Elisha H. Allen (W)

==== 1843–1853: 7 seats ====
	District						
	1st	2nd	3rd	4th	5th	6th	7th
28th (1843–1845)	Joshua Herrick (D)	Robert P. Dunlap (D)	Luther Severance (W)	Freeman H. Morse (W)	Benjamin White (D)	Hannibal Hamlin (D)	Shepard Cary (D)
29th (1845–1847)	John F. Scamman (D)	Robert P. Dunlap (D)	Luther Severance (W)	John D. McCrate (D)	Cullen Sawtelle (D)	Hannibal Hamlin (D)	Hezekiah Williams (D)
30th (1847–1849)	David Hammons (D)	Asa Clapp (D)	Hiram Belcher (W)	Franklin Clark (D)	Ephraim K. Smart (D)	James S. Wiley (D)	Hezekiah Williams (D)
31st (1849–1851)	Elbridge Gerry (D)	Nathaniel Littlefield (D)	John Otis (W)	Rufus K. Goodenow (W)	Cullen Sawtelle (D)	Charles Stetson (D)	Thomas J. D. Fuller (D)
32nd (1851–1853)	Moses Macdonald (D)	John Appleton (D)	Robert Goodenow (W)	Charles Andrews (D)	Ephraim K. Smart (D)	Israel Washburn Jr. (W)	Thomas J. D. Fuller (D)
32nd (1851–1853)	Moses Macdonald (D)	John Appleton (D)	Robert Goodenow (W)	Isaac Reed (W)	Ephraim K. Smart (D)	Israel Washburn Jr. (W)	Thomas J. D. Fuller (D)

==== 1853–1863: 6 seats ====
Congress	1st district	2nd district	3rd district	4th district	5th district	6th district
33rd (1853–1855)	Moses Macdonald (D)	Samuel Mayall (D)	E. Wilder Farley (W)	Samuel P. Benson (W)	Israel Washburn Jr. (W)	Thomas J. D. Fuller (D)
34th (1855–1857)	John M. Wood (R)	John J. Perry (O)	Ebenezer Knowlton (O)	Samuel P. Benson (O)	Israel Washburn Jr. (R)	Thomas J. D. Fuller (D)
35th (1857–1859)	John M. Wood (R)	Charles J. Gilman (R)	Nehemiah Abbott (R)	Freeman H. Morse (R)	Israel Washburn Jr. (R)	Stephen Clark; Foster (R)
36th (1859–1861)	Daniel E. Somes (R)	John J. Perry (R)	Ezra B. French (R)	Freeman H. Morse (R)	Israel Washburn Jr. (R)	Stephen Clark; Foster (R)
36th (1859–1861)	Daniel E. Somes (R)	John J. Perry (R)	Ezra B. French (R)	Freeman H. Morse (R)	Stephen Coburn (R)	Stephen Clark; Foster (R)
37th (1861–1863)	John N. Goodwin (R)	Charles W. Walton (R)	Samuel C. Fessenden (R)	Anson Morrill (R)	John H. Rice (R)	Frederick A. Pike (R)
37th (1861–1863)	John N. Goodwin (R)	T. A. D. Fessenden (R)	Samuel C. Fessenden (R)	Anson Morrill (R)	John H. Rice (R)	Frederick A. Pike (R)

==== 1863–1883: 5 seats ====
Congress	1st district	2nd district	3rd district	4th district	5th district
38th (1863–1865)	Lorenzo Sweat (D)	Sidney Perham (R)	James G. Blaine (R)	John H. Rice (R)	Frederick A. Pike (R)
39th (1865–1867)	John Lynch (R)	Sidney Perham (R)	James G. Blaine (R)	John H. Rice (R)	Frederick A. Pike (R)
40th (1867–1869)	John Lynch (R)	Sidney Perham (R)	James G. Blaine (R)	John A. Peters (R)	Frederick A. Pike (R)
41st (1869–1871)	John Lynch (R)	Samuel P. Morrill (R)	James G. Blaine (R)	John A. Peters (R)	Eugene Hale (R)
42nd (1871–1873)	John Lynch (R)	William P. Frye (R)	James G. Blaine (R)	John A. Peters (R)	Eugene Hale (R)
43rd (1873–1875)	John H. Burleigh (R)	William P. Frye (R)	James G. Blaine (R)	Samuel F. Hersey (R)	Eugene Hale (R)
44th (1875–1877)	John H. Burleigh (R)	William P. Frye (R)	James G. Blaine (R)	Samuel F. Hersey (R)	Eugene Hale (R)
44th (1875–1877)	John H. Burleigh (R)	William P. Frye (R)	Edwin Flye (R)	Harris M. Plaisted (R)	Eugene Hale (R)
45th (1877–1879)	Thomas Brackett; Reed (R)	William P. Frye (R)	Stephen Lindsey (R)	Llewellyn Powers (R)	Eugene Hale (R)
46th (1879–1881)	Thomas Brackett; Reed (R)	William P. Frye (R)	Stephen Lindsey (R)	George W. Ladd (GB)	Thomas H. Murch (GB)
47th (1881–1883)	Thomas Brackett; Reed (R)	Nelson Dingley Jr. (R)	Stephen Lindsey (R)	George W. Ladd (GB)	Thomas H. Murch (GB)

==== 1883–1933: 4 seats ====
Congress	Statewide at-large on a general ticket			
Congress	1st seat	2nd seat	3rd seat	4th seat
48th (1883–1885)	Thomas Brackett; Reed (R)	Nelson Dingley Jr. (R)	Seth L. Milliken (R)	Charles A. Boutelle (R)
Congress	1st district	2nd district	3rd district	4th district
49th (1885–1887)	Thomas Brackett; Reed (R)	Nelson Dingley Jr. (R)	Seth L. Milliken (R)	Charles A. Boutelle (R)
50th (1887–1889)	Thomas Brackett; Reed (R)	Nelson Dingley Jr. (R)	Seth L. Milliken (R)	Charles A. Boutelle (R)
51st (1889–1891)	Thomas Brackett; Reed (R)	Nelson Dingley Jr. (R)	Seth L. Milliken (R)	Charles A. Boutelle (R)
52nd (1891–1893)	Thomas Brackett; Reed (R)	Nelson Dingley Jr. (R)	Seth L. Milliken (R)	Charles A. Boutelle (R)
53rd (1893–1895)	Thomas Brackett; Reed (R)	Nelson Dingley Jr. (R)	Seth L. Milliken (R)	Charles A. Boutelle (R)
54th (1895–1897)	Thomas Brackett; Reed (R)	Nelson Dingley Jr. (R)	Seth L. Milliken (R)	Charles A. Boutelle (R)
55th (1897–1899)	Thomas Brackett; Reed (R)	Nelson Dingley Jr. (R)	Seth L. Milliken (R)	Charles A. Boutelle (R)
55th (1897–1899)	Thomas Brackett; Reed (R)	Nelson Dingley Jr. (R)	Edwin C. Burleigh (R)	Charles A. Boutelle (R)
56th (1899–1901)	Amos L. Allen (R)	Nelson Dingley Jr. (R)	Edwin C. Burleigh (R)	Charles A. Boutelle (R)
56th (1899–1901)	Amos L. Allen (R)	Charles E. Littlefield (R)	Edwin C. Burleigh (R)	Charles A. Boutelle (R)
57th (1901–1903)	Amos L. Allen (R)	Charles E. Littlefield (R)	Edwin C. Burleigh (R)	Llewellyn Powers (R)
58th (1903–1905)	Amos L. Allen (R)	Charles E. Littlefield (R)	Edwin C. Burleigh (R)	Llewellyn Powers (R)
59th (1905–1907)	Amos L. Allen (R)	Charles E. Littlefield (R)	Edwin C. Burleigh (R)	Llewellyn Powers (R)
60th (1907–1909)	Amos L. Allen (R)	Charles E. Littlefield (R)	Edwin C. Burleigh (R)	Llewellyn Powers (R)
60th (1907–1909)	Amos L. Allen (R)	John P. Swasey (R)	Edwin C. Burleigh (R)	Frank E. Guernsey (R)
61st (1909–1911)	Amos L. Allen (R)	John P. Swasey (R)	Edwin C. Burleigh (R)	Frank E. Guernsey (R)
62nd (1911–1913)	Asher Hinds (R)	Daniel J. McGillicuddy (D)	Samuel Wadsworth; Gould (D)	Frank E. Guernsey (R)
63rd (1913–1915)	Asher Hinds (R)	Daniel J. McGillicuddy (D)	Forrest Goodwin (R)	Frank E. Guernsey (R)
63rd (1913–1915)	Asher Hinds (R)	Daniel J. McGillicuddy (D)	John A. Peters (R)	Frank E. Guernsey (R)
64th (1915–1917)	Asher Hinds (R)	Daniel J. McGillicuddy (D)	John A. Peters (R)	Frank E. Guernsey (R)
65th (1917–1919)	Louis B. Goodall (R)	Wallace H. White (R)	John A. Peters (R)	Ira G. Hersey (R)
66th (1919–1921)	Louis B. Goodall (R)	Wallace H. White (R)	John A. Peters (R)	Ira G. Hersey (R)
67th (1921–1923)	Carroll L. Beedy (R)	Wallace H. White (R)	John A. Peters (R)	Ira G. Hersey (R)
67th (1921–1923)	Carroll L. Beedy (R)	Wallace H. White (R)	John E. Nelson (R)	Ira G. Hersey (R)
68th (1923–1925)	Carroll L. Beedy (R)	Wallace H. White (R)	John E. Nelson (R)	Ira G. Hersey (R)
69th (1925–1927)	Carroll L. Beedy (R)	Wallace H. White (R)	John E. Nelson (R)	Ira G. Hersey (R)
70th (1927–1929)	Carroll L. Beedy (R)	Wallace H. White (R)	John E. Nelson (R)	Ira G. Hersey (R)
71st (1929–1931)	Carroll L. Beedy (R)	Wallace H. White (R)	John E. Nelson (R)	Donald F. Snow (R)
72nd (1931–1933)	Carroll L. Beedy (R)	Donald B. Partridge (R)	John E. Nelson (R)	Donald F. Snow (R)

==== 1933–1963: 3 seats ====
Congress	1st district	2nd district	3rd district
73rd (1933–1935)	Carroll L. Beedy (R)	Edward C. Moran Jr. (D)	John G. Utterback (D)
74th (1935–1937)	Simon M. Hamlin (D)	Edward C. Moran Jr. (D)	Owen Brewster (R)
75th (1937–1939)	James C. Oliver (R)	Clyde H. Smith (R)	Owen Brewster (R)
76th (1939–1941)	James C. Oliver (R)	Clyde H. Smith (R)	Owen Brewster (R)
76th (1939–1941)	James C. Oliver (R)	Margaret Chase; Smith (R)	Owen Brewster (R)
77th (1941–1943)	James C. Oliver (R)	Margaret Chase; Smith (R)	Frank Fellows (R)
78th (1943–1945)	Robert Hale (R)	Margaret Chase; Smith (R)	Frank Fellows (R)
79th (1945–1947)	Robert Hale (R)	Margaret Chase; Smith (R)	Frank Fellows (R)
80th (1947–1949)	Robert Hale (R)	Margaret Chase; Smith (R)	Frank Fellows (R)
81st (1949–1951)	Robert Hale (R)	Charles P. Nelson (R)	Frank Fellows (R)
82nd (1951–1953)	Robert Hale (R)	Charles P. Nelson (R)	Frank Fellows (R)
82nd (1951–1953)	Robert Hale (R)	Charles P. Nelson (R)	Clifford McIntire (R)
83rd (1953–1955)	Robert Hale (R)	Charles P. Nelson (R)	Clifford McIntire (R)
84th (1955–1957)	Robert Hale (R)	Charles P. Nelson (R)	Clifford McIntire (R)
85th (1957–1959)	Robert Hale (R)	Frank M. Coffin (D)	Clifford McIntire (R)
86th (1959–1961)	James C. Oliver (D)	Frank M. Coffin (D)	Clifford McIntire (R)
87th (1961–1963)	Peter A. Garland (R)	Stanley R. Tupper (R)	Clifford McIntire (R)

==== 1963–present: 2 seats ====
Congress	1st district	2nd district
88th (1963–1965)	Stanley R. Tupper (R)	Clifford McIntire (R)
89th (1965–1967)	Stanley R. Tupper (R)	William Hathaway (D)
90th (1967–1969)	Peter Kyros (D)	William Hathaway (D)
91st (1969–1971)	Peter Kyros (D)	William Hathaway (D)
92nd (1971–1973)	Peter Kyros (D)	William Hathaway (D)
93rd (1973–1975)	Peter Kyros (D)	William Cohen (R)
94th (1975–1977)	David F. Emery (R)	William Cohen (R)
95th (1977–1979)	David F. Emery (R)	William Cohen (R)
96th (1979–1981)	David F. Emery (R)	Olympia Snowe (R)
97th (1981–1983)	David F. Emery (R)	Olympia Snowe (R)
98th (1983–1985)	Jock McKernan (R)	Olympia Snowe (R)
99th (1985–1987)	Jock McKernan (R)	Olympia Snowe (R)
100th (1987–1989)	Joe Brennan (D)	Olympia Snowe (R)
101st (1989–1991)	Joe Brennan (D)	Olympia Snowe (R)
102nd (1991–1993)	Thomas Andrews (D)	Olympia Snowe (R)
103rd (1993–1995)	Thomas Andrews (D)	Olympia Snowe (R)
104th (1995–1997)	Jim Longley (R)	John Baldacci (D)
105th (1997–1999)	Tom Allen (D)	John Baldacci (D)
106th (1999–2001)	Tom Allen (D)	John Baldacci (D)
107th (2001–2003)	Tom Allen (D)	John Baldacci (D)
108th (2003–2005)	Tom Allen (D)	Mike Michaud (D)
109th (2005–2007)	Tom Allen (D)	Mike Michaud (D)
110th (2007–2009)	Tom Allen (D)	Mike Michaud (D)
111th (2009–2011)	Chellie Pingree (D)	Mike Michaud (D)
112th (2011–2013)	Chellie Pingree (D)	Mike Michaud (D)
113th (2013–2015)	Chellie Pingree (D)	Mike Michaud (D)
114th (2015–2017)	Chellie Pingree (D)	Bruce Poliquin (R)
115th (2017–2019)	Chellie Pingree (D)	Bruce Poliquin (R)
116th (2019–2021)	Chellie Pingree (D)	Jared Golden (D)
117th (2021–2023)	Chellie Pingree (D)	Jared Golden (D)
118th (2023–2025)	Chellie Pingree (D)	Jared Golden (D)
119th (2025–2027)	Chellie Pingree (D)	Jared Golden (D)
120th (2027–2029)	Chellie Pingree (D)	Paul LePage (R)

== Key ==
Democratic (D)
Democratic-Republican (DR)
Federalist (F)
Pro-Administration (PA)
Greenback (GB)
Independent Democrat (ID)
Jacksonian (J)
National Republican (NR)
Opposition Northern (O)
Republican (R)
Whig (W)

== See also ==
- List of United States congressional districts
- Maine's congressional districts
- Political party strength in Maine
