= List of United States representatives from Maine =

The following is an alphabetical list of United States representatives from the state of Maine. For chronological tables of members of both houses of the United States Congress from the state (through the present day), see Maine's congressional delegations. The list of names should be complete, but other data may be incomplete.

== Current members ==
District	Member (Residence)	Party	CPVI	Incumbency	District map
1st	Chellie Pingree (North Haven)	Democratic	D+9	Since January 3, 2009	
2nd	Jared Golden (Lewiston)	Democratic	R+6	Since January 3, 2019	

== List of members ==
Member	Party	Years	District	Electoral history
Nehemiah Abbott	Republican	March 4, 1857 – March 3, 1859	3rd	Elected in 1856. Retired.
Amos L. Allen	Republican	November 6, 1899 – March 3, 1911	1st	Elected to finish Reed's term. Retired but died before next term.
Elisha Hunt Allen	Whig	March 4, 1841 – March 3, 1843	8th	Elected in 1840. Redistricted to the 6th district and lost re-election to Hamlin.
Tom Allen	Democratic	January 3, 1997 – January 3, 2009	1st	Elected in 1996. Retired to run for U.S. Senator.
Hugh J. Anderson	Democratic	March 4, 1837 – March 3, 1841	6th	Elected in 1836. Retired.
John Anderson	Jacksonian	March 4, 1825 – March 3, 1833	2nd	Elected in 1824. Retired to run for Mayor of Portland.
Charles Andrews	Democratic	March 4, 1851 – April 30, 1852	4th	Elected in 1850. Died.
Tom Andrews	Democratic	January 3, 1991 – January 3, 1995	1st	Elected in 1990. Retired to run for U.S. Senator.
John Appleton	Democratic	March 4, 1851 – March 3, 1853	2nd	Elected in 1850. Retired.
Jeremiah Bailey	Anti-Jacksonian	March 4, 1835 – March 4, 1837	3rd	Elected in 1834. Lost re-election to Cilley.
John Baldacci	Democratic	January 3, 1995 – January 3, 2003	2nd	Elected in 1994. Retired to run for governor.
James Bates	Jacksonian	March 4, 1831 – March 3, 1833	7th	Elected in 1830. Retired.
Carroll L. Beedy	Republican	March 4, 1921 – January 3, 1935	1st	Elected in 1920. Lost re-election to S. Hamlin.
Hiram Belcher	Whig	March 4, 1847 – March 3, 1849	3rd	Elected in 1846. Retired.
Samuel P. Benson	Whig	March 4, 1853 – March 3, 1855	4th	Elected in 1852. Switched parties.
Samuel P. Benson	Opposition	March 4, 1855 – March 3, 1857	4th	Re-elected in 1854 as an Opposition Party candidate. Retired.
James G. Blaine	Republican	March 4, 1863 – July 10, 1876	3rd	Elected in 1862. Resigned when appointed U.S. Senator.
Charles A. Boutelle	Republican	March 4, 1883 – March 3, 1885	At-large	Elected in 1882. Redistricted to the 4th district.
Charles A. Boutelle	Republican	March 4, 1885 – March 3, 1901	4th	Redistricted from the at-large district and re-elected in 1884. Re-elected but resigned before next term.
Joseph E. Brennan	Democratic	January 3, 1987 – January 3, 1991	1st	Elected in 1986. (Note: The service of member-elect Joseph E. Brennan began January 3, 1987 even though he was sworn in January 9, 1987 to finish his term as the outgoing Governor of Maine.); Retired to run for governor.
Owen Brewster	Republican	January 3, 1935 – January 3, 1941	3rd	Elected in 1934. Retired to run for U.S. Senator.
David Bronson	Whig	March 4, 1841 – March 3, 1843	4th	Elected to finish Evans's term. Retired.
Edwin C. Burleigh	Republican	June 21, 1897 – March 3, 1911	3rd	Elected to finish Milliken's term. Lost re-election to Gould.
John H. Burleigh	Republican	March 4, 1873 – March 3, 1877	1st	Elected in 1872. Lost renomination to T. Reed.
William Burleigh	Democratic-Republican	March 4, 1823 – March 3, 1825	1st	Elected in 1823. Switched parties.
William Burleigh	Anti-Jacksonian	March 4, 1825 – July 2, 1827	1st	Re-elected in 1824 as an Anti-Jacksonian. Died.
Samuel Butman	Anti-Jacksonian	March 4, 1827 – March 3, 1831	7th	Elected in 1827. Retired.
Timothy J. Carter	Democratic	March 4, 1837 – March 14, 1838	5th	Elected in 1836. Died.
Shepard Cary	Democratic	March 4, 1843 – March 3, 1845	7th	Elected in 1843. Retired.
Jonathan Cilley	Democratic	March 4, 1837 – February 24, 1838	3rd	Elected in 1836. Died.
Asa Clapp	Democratic	March 4, 1847 – March 3, 1849	2nd	Elected in 1846. Retired.
Franklin Clark	Democratic	March 4, 1847 – March 3, 1849	4th	Elected in 1846. Retired.
Nathan Clifford	Democratic	March 4, 1839 – March 3, 1843	1st	Elected in 1838. Retired.
Stephen Coburn	Republican	January 2, 1861 – March 3, 1861	5th	Elected to finish Washburn's term. Retired.
Frank M. Coffin	Democratic	January 3, 1957 – January 3, 1961	2nd	Elected in 1956. Retired to run for governor.
William Cohen	Republican	January 3, 1973 – January 3, 1979	2nd	Elected in 1972. Retired to run for U.S. Senator.
Joshua Cushman	Democratic-Republican	March 4, 1821 – March 3, 1823	6th	Redistricted from Massachusetts's 19th district and re-elected in 1820. Redistricted to the 4th district.
Joshua Cushman	Democratic-Republican	March 4, 1823 – March 3, 1825	4th	Redistricted from the 6th district and re-elected in 1823. Lost re-election to Sprague.
Joseph Dane	Federalist	December 11, 1820 – March 3, 1821	At-large	Elected finish John Holmes's term. Redistricted to the 1st district.
Joseph Dane	Federalist	March 4, 1821 – March 3, 1823	1st	Redistricted]] from the at-large district and re-elected in 1820. Retired.
Thomas Davee	Democratic	March 4, 1837 – March 3, 1841	8th	Elected in 1836. Retired.
Nelson Dingley Jr.	Republican	September 12, 1881 – March 3, 1883	2nd	Elected to finish Frye's term. Redistricted to the at-large district.
Nelson Dingley Jr.	Republican	March 4, 1883 – March 3, 1885	At-large	Redistricted from the 2nd district and re-elected in 1882. Redistricted to the 2nd district.
Nelson Dingley Jr.	Republican	March 4, 1885 – January 13, 1899	2nd	Redistricted]] from the at-large district and re-elected in 1884. Re-elected but died before next term.
Robert P. Dunlap	Democratic	March 4, 1843 – March 3, 1847	2nd	Elected in 1843. Retired.
David F. Emery	Republican	January 3, 1975 – January 3, 1983	1st	Elected in 1974. Retired to run for U.S. Senator.
George Evans	Anti-Jacksonian	July 20, 1829 – March 3, 1837	4th	Elected to finish Sprague's term. Switched parties.
George Evans	Whig	March 4, 1837 – March 3, 1841	4th	Re-elected in 1836 as a Whig. Re-elected but resigned when elected U.S. Senator.
John Fairfield	Jacksonian	March 4, 1835 – December 24, 1838	1st	Elected in 1834. Retired to run for governor and resigned when elected.
E. Wilder Farley	Whig	March 4, 1853 – March 3, 1855	3rd	Elected in 1852. Lost re-election to Knowlton.
Frank Fellows	Republican	January 3, 1941 – August 27, 1951	3rd	Elected in 1940. Died.
Samuel C. Fessenden	Republican	March 4, 1861 – March 3, 1863	3rd	Elected in 1860. Retired.
Thomas Fessenden	Republican	December 1, 1862 – March 3, 1863	2nd	Elected to finish Walton's term. Retired.
William P. Fessenden	Whig	March 4, 1841 – March 3, 1843	2nd	Elected in 1840. Retired.
Edwin Flye	Republican	December 4, 1876 – March 3, 1877	3rd	Elected to finish Blaine's term. Retired.
Stephen Clark Foster	Republican	March 4, 1857 – March 3, 1861	6th	Elected in 1856. Retired.
Ezra B. French	Republican	March 4, 1859 – March 3, 1861	3rd	Elected in 1858. Retired.
William P. Frye	Republican	March 4, 1871 – March 17, 1881	2nd	Elected in 1870. Resigned when elected U.S. senator.
Thomas J. D. Fuller	Democratic	March 4, 1849 – March 3, 1853	7th	Elected in 1848. Redistricted to the 6th district.
Thomas J. D. Fuller	Democratic	March 4, 1853 – March 3, 1857	6th	Redistricted from the 7th district and re-elected in 1852. Retired.
Peter A. Garland	Republican	January 3, 1961 – January 3, 1963	1st	Elected in 1960. Lost renomination to Tupper.
Elbridge Gerry	Democratic	March 4, 1849 – March 3, 1851	1st	Elected in 1848. Retired.
Charles J. Gilman	Republican	March 4, 1857 – March 3, 1859	2nd	Elected in 1856. Retired.
Jared Golden	Democratic	January 3, 2019 – present	2nd	Elected in 2018. Incumbent.
Louis B. Goodall	Republican	March 4, 1917 – March 3, 1921	1st	Elected in 1916. Retired.
Robert Goodenow	Whig	March 4, 1851 – March 3, 1853	3rd	Elected in 1850. Lost renomination to Farley.
Rufus K. Goodenow	Whig	March 4, 1849 – March 3, 1851	4th	Elected in 1848. Retired.
Forrest Goodwin	Republican	March 4, 1913 – May 28, 1913	3rd	Elected in 1912. Died.
John Noble Goodwin	Republican	March 4, 1861 – March 3, 1863	1st	Elected in 1860. Lost re-election to Sweat.
Samuel Wadsworth Gould	Democratic	March 4, 1911 – March 3, 1913	3rd	Elected in 1910. Lost re-election to F. Goodwin.
Frank E. Guernsey	Republican	November 3, 1908 – March 3, 1917	4th	Elected to finish Powers's term. Retired to run for U.S. senator.
Eugene Hale	Republican	March 4, 1869 – March 3, 1879	5th	Elected in 1868. Lost re-election to Murch.
Robert Hale	Republican	January 3, 1943 – January 3, 1959	1st	Elected in 1942. Lost re-election to Oliver.
Joseph Hall	Jacksonian	March 4, 1833 – March 3, 1837	7th	Elected in 1833. Retired.
Hannibal Hamlin	Democratic	March 4, 1843 – March 3, 1847	6th	Elected in 1843. Retired to run for U.S. senator.
Simon M. Hamlin	Democratic	January 3, 1935 – January 3, 1937	1st	Elected in 1934. Lost re-election to Oliver.
David Hammons	Democratic	March 4, 1847 – March 3, 1849	1st	Elected in 1846. Retired.
Mark Harris	Democratic-Republican	December 2, 1822 – March 3, 1823	2nd	Elected to finish Whitman's term. Retired.
William Hathaway	Democratic	January 3, 1965 – January 3, 1973	2nd	Elected in 1964. Retired to run for U.S. Senator.
Ebenezer Herrick	Democratic-Republican	March 4, 1823 – March 3, 1823	5th	Elected in 1821. Redistricted to the 3rd district.
Ebenezer Herrick	Democratic-Republican	March 4, 1823 – March 3, 1825	3rd	Redistricted from the 5th district and re-elected in 1823. Switched parties.
Ebenezer Herrick	Anti-Jacksonian	March 4, 1825 – March 3, 1827	3rd	Re-elected in 1825 as an Anti-Jacksonian. Retired.
Joshua Herrick	Democratic	March 4, 1843 – March 3, 1845	1st	Elected in 1843. Lost renomination to Scamman.
Ira G. Hersey	Republican	March 4, 1917 – March 3, 1929	4th	Elected in 1916. Lost renomination to Snow.
Samuel F. Hersey	Republican	March 4, 1873 – February 3, 1875	4th	Elected in 1872. Re-elected but died before next term.
Mark Langdon Hill	Democratic-Republican	March 4, 1821 – March 3, 1823	3rd	Redistricted from Massachusetts's 16th district and re-elected in 1821. Lost re-election to E. Herrick.
Asher Hinds	Republican	March 4, 1911 – March 3, 1917	1st	Elected in 1910. Retired.
Cornelius Holland	Jacksonian	December 6, 1830 – March 3, 1833	5th	Elected to finish Ripley's term. Retired.
Leonard Jarvis	Jacksonian	March 4, 1829 – March 3, 1833	6th	Elected in 1830. (Note: He was elected to the 1829–1831 term on April 5, 1830, near the end of the Congress.); Redistricted to the 7th district.
Leonard Jarvis	Jacksonian	March 4, 1833 – March 3, 1837	7th	Redistricted from the 6th district and Re-elected in 1833. Retired.
Edward Kavanagh	Jacksonian	March 4, 1831 – March 3, 1835	3rd	Elected in 1830. Lost re-election to Bailey.
David Kidder	Democratic-Republican	March 4, 1823 – March 3, 1825	7th	Elected in 1823. Switched parties.
David Kidder	Anti-Jacksonian	March 4, 1825 – March 3, 1827	7th	Re-elected in 1824 as an Anti-Jacksonian. Retired.
Ebenezer Knowlton	Opposition	March 4, 1855 – March 3, 1857	3rd	Elected in 1854. Retired.
Peter Kyros	Democratic	January 3, 1967 – January 3, 1975	1st	Elected in 1966. Lost re-election to Emery.
George W. Ladd	Greenback	March 4, 1879 – March 3, 1883	4th	Elected in 1878. Redistricted to the at-large district and lost re-election to four others. (Note: T. Reed, Dingley, Milliken and Boutelle)
Enoch Lincoln	Democratic-Republican	March 4, 1821 – March 3, 1823	7th	Redistricted from Massachusetts's 20th district and re-elected in 1820. Redistricted to the 5th district.
Enoch Lincoln	Democratic-Republican	March 4, 1823 – March 3, 1825	5th	Redistricted from the 7th district and re-elected in 1823. Switched parties.
Enoch Lincoln	Anti-Jacksonian	March 4, 1825 – 1826	5th	Re-elected in 1824 as an Anti-Jacksonian. Resigned.
Stephen Lindsey	Republican	March 4, 1877 – March 3, 1883	3rd	Elected in 1876. Retired.
Charles E. Littlefield	Republican	June 19, 1899 – September 30, 1908	2nd	Elected to finish Dingley's term. Resigned.
Nathaniel Littlefield	Democratic	March 4, 1841 – March 3, 1843	5th	Elected in 1840. Retired.
Nathaniel Littlefield	Democratic	March 4, 1849 – March 3, 1851	2nd	Elected in 1848. Retired.
Stephen Longfellow	Federalist	March 4, 1823 – March 3, 1825	2nd	Elected in 1823. Lost re-election to J. Anderson.
James B. Longley Jr.	Republican	January 3, 1995 – January 3, 1997	1st	Elected in 1994. Lost re-election to T. Allen.
Joshua A. Lowell	Democratic	March 4, 1839 – March 3, 1843	7th	Elected in 1838. Retired.
John Lynch	Republican	March 4, 1865 – March 3, 1873	1st	Elected in 1864. Retired.
Moses Macdonald	Democratic	March 4, 1851 – March 3, 1855	1st	Elected in 1850. Retired.
Alfred Marshall	Democratic	March 4, 1841 – March 3, 1843	6th	Elected in 1840. Retired.
Moses Mason Jr.	Jacksonian	March 4, 1833 – March 3, 1837	5th	Elected in 1833. Retired.
Samuel Mayall	Democratic	March 4, 1853 – March 3, 1855	2nd	Elected in 1852. Retired.
John D. McCrate	Democratic	March 4, 1845 – March 3, 1847	4th	Elected in 1844. Retired.
Daniel J. McGillicuddy	Democratic	March 4, 1911 – March 3, 1917	2nd	Elected in 1910. Lost re-election to W. White Jr.
Clifford McIntire	Republican	October 22, 1951 – January 3, 1963	3rd	Elected to finish Fellows's term. Redistricted to the 2nd district.
Clifford McIntire	Republican	January 3, 1963 – January 3, 1965	2nd	Redistricted from the 3rd district and re-elected in 1962. Retired to run for U.S. Senator.
Rufus McIntire	Jacksonian	September 10, 1827 – March 3, 1835	1st	Elected to finish Burleigh's term. Retired.
John R. McKernan Jr.	Republican	January 3, 1983 – January 3, 1987	1st	Elected in 1982. Retired to run for governor.
Mike Michaud	Democratic	January 3, 2003 – January 3, 2015	2nd	Elected in 2002. Retired to run for governor.
Seth L. Milliken	Republican	March 4, 1883 – March 3, 1885	At-large	Elected in 1882. Redistricted to the 3rd district.
Seth L. Milliken	Republican	March 4, 1885 – April 18, 1897	3rd	Redistricted from the at-large district and re-elected in 1884. Died.
Edward C. Moran Jr.	Democratic	March 4, 1933 – January 3, 1937	2nd	Elected in 1932. Retired.
Anson Morrill	Republican	March 4, 1861 – March 3, 1863	4th	Elected in 1860. Retired.
Samuel P. Morrill	Republican	March 4, 1869 – March 3, 1871	2nd	Elected in 1868. Lost renomination to Frye.
Freeman H. Morse	Whig	March 4, 1843 – March 3, 1845	4th	Elected in 1843. Retired.
Freeman H. Morse	Republican	March 4, 1857 – March 3, 1861	4th	Elected in 1856. Retired.
Thompson H. Murch	Greenback	March 4, 1879 – March 3, 1883	5th	Elected in 1878. Redistricted to the at-large district and lost re-election to four others.
Charles P. Nelson	Republican	January 3, 1949 – January 3, 1957	2nd	Elected in 1948. Retired.
John E. Nelson	Republican	March 20, 1922 – March 3, 1933	3rd	Elected to finish Peters's term. Lost re-election to Utterback.
Joseph C. Noyes	Whig	March 4, 1837 – March 3, 1839	7th	Elected in 1836. Lost re-election to Lowell.
Jeremiah O'Brien	Democratic-Republican	March 4, 1823 – March 3, 1825	6th	Elected in 1823. Switched parties.
Jeremiah O'Brien	Anti-Jacksonian	March 4, 1825 – March 3, 1829	6th	Re-elected in 1824 as an Anti-Jacksonian. Lost re-election to Jarvis.
James C. Oliver	Republican	January 3, 1937 – January 3, 1943	1st	Elected in 1936. Lost renomination to R. Hale.
James C. Oliver	Democratic	January 3, 1959 – January 3, 1961	1st	Elected in 1958. Lost re-election to Garland.
John Otis	Whig	March 4, 1849 – March 3, 1851	3rd	Elected in 1848. Retired.
Gorham Parks	Jacksonian	March 4, 1833 – March 3, 1837	8th	Elected in 1833. Retired to run for governor.
Virgil D. Parris	Democratic	May 29, 1838 – March 3, 1841	5th	Elected to finish Carter's term. Lost renomination to Littlefield.
Donald B. Partridge	Republican	March 4, 1931 – March 3, 1933	2nd	Elected in 1930. Retired.
Sidney Perham	Republican	March 4, 1863 – March 3, 1869	2nd	Elected in 1862. Retired.
John J. Perry	Opposition	March 4, 1855 – March 3, 1857	2nd	Elected in 1854. Retired.
John J. Perry	Republican	March 4, 1859 – March 3, 1861	2nd	Elected in 1858. Retired.
John A. Peters	Republican	March 4, 1867 – March 3, 1873	4th	Elected in 1866. Retired.
John A. Peters	Republican	September 9, 1913 – January 2, 1922	3rd	Elected to finish Goodwin's term. Resigned to become Judge of the United States District Court for the District of Maine.
Frederick A. Pike	Republican	March 4, 1861 – March 3, 1863	6th	Elected in 1860. Redistricted to the 5th district.
Frederick A. Pike	Republican	March 4, 1863 – March 3, 1869	5th	Redistricted from the 6th district and re-elected in 1862. Lost renomination to E. Hale.
Chellie Pingree	Democratic	January 3, 2009 – present	1st	Elected in 2008. Incumbent.
Harris M. Plaisted	Republican	September 13, 1875 – March 3, 1877	4th	Elected to finish Hersey's term. Retired.
Bruce Poliquin	Republican	January 3, 2015 – January 3, 2019	2nd	Elected in 2014. Lost re-election to Golden.
Llewellyn Powers	Republican	March 4, 1877 – March 3, 1879	4th	Elected in 1876. Lost re-election to Ladd.
Llewellyn Powers	Republican	April 8, 1901 – July 28, 1908	4th	Elected to finish Boutelle's term. Died.
Benjamin Randall	Whig	March 4, 1839 – March 3, 1843	3rd	Elected in 1838. Retired.
Isaac Reed	Whig	June 25, 1852 – March 3, 1853	4th	Elected to finish Andrews's term. Retired.
Thomas Brackett Reed	Republican	March 4, 1877 – March 3, 1883	1st	Elected in 1876. Redistricted to the at-large district.
Thomas Brackett Reed	Republican	March 4, 1883 – March 3, 1885	At-large	Redistricted from the 1st district and Re-elected in 1882. Redistricted to the 1st district.
Thomas Brackett Reed	Republican	March 4, 1885 – September 4, 1899	1st	Redistricted from the at-large district and re-elected in 1884. Resigned to protest the Spanish–American War.
John H. Rice	Republican	March 4, 1861 – March 3, 1863	5th	Elected in 1860. Redistricted to the 4th district.
John H. Rice	Republican	March 4, 1863 – March 3, 1867	4th	Redistricted from the 5th district and re-elected in 1862. Retired.
James W. Ripley	Jacksonian	September 11, 1826 – March 12, 1830	5th	Elected to finish Lincoln's term Resigned.
Edward Robinson	Whig	April 28, 1838 – March 3, 1839	3rd	Elected to finish Cilley's term. Retired.
Cullen Sawtelle	Democratic	March 4, 1845 – March 3, 1847	5th	Elected in 1844. Retired.
Cullen Sawtelle	Democratic	March 4, 1849 – March 3, 1851	5th	Elected in 1848. Retired.
John Fairfield Scamman	Democratic	March 4, 1845 – March 3, 1847	1st	Elected in 1844. Retired.
Luther Severance	Whig	March 4, 1843 – March 3, 1847	3rd	Elected in 1843. Retired.
Ephraim K. Smart	Democratic	March 4, 1847 – March 3, 1849	5th	Elected in 1846. Retired.
Ephraim K. Smart	Democratic	March 4, 1851 – March 3, 1853	5th	Elected in 1850. Lost re-election to Washburn.
Albert Smith	Democratic	March 4, 1839 – March 3, 1841	2nd	Elected in 1838. Lost re-election to W. Fessenden.
Clyde H. Smith	Republican	January 3, 1937 – April 8, 1940	2nd	Elected in 1936. Died.
Francis Smith	Jacksonian	March 4, 1833 – March 3, 1837	2nd	Elected in 1833. Switched parties.
Francis Smith	Democratic	March 4, 1837 – March 3, 1839	2nd	Re-elected in 1836 as a Democrat. Lost re-election to A. Smith.
Margaret Chase Smith	Republican	June 3, 1940 – January 3, 1949	2nd	Elected to finish her husband's term. Retired to run for U.S. Senator.
Donald F. Snow	Republican	March 4, 1929 – March 3, 1933	4th	Elected in 1928. Redistricted to the 3rd district and lost renomination to Brewster.
Olympia Snowe	Republican	January 3, 1979 – January 3, 1995	2nd	Elected in 1978. Retired to run for U.S. Senator.
Daniel E. Somes	Republican	March 4, 1859 – March 3, 1861	1st	Elected in 1858. Retired.
Peleg Sprague	Anti-Jacksonian	March 4, 1825 – March 3, 1829	4th	Elected in 1825. Re-elected but resigned when elected U.S. senator.
Charles Stetson	Democratic	March 4, 1849 – March 3, 1851	6th	Elected in 1848. Lost renomination.
John P. Swasey	Republican	November 3, 1908 – March 3, 1911	2nd	Elected to finish Littlefield's term. Lost re-election to McGillicuddy.
Lorenzo De Medici Sweat	Democratic	March 4, 1863 – March 3, 1865	1st	Elected in 1862. Lost re-election to Lynch.
Stanley R. Tupper	Republican	January 3, 1961 – January 3, 1963	2nd	Elected in 1960. Redistricted to the 1st district.
Stanley R. Tupper	Republican	January 3, 1963 – January 3, 1967	1st	Redistricted from the 2nd district and re-elected in 1962. Retired.
John G. Utterback	Democratic	March 4, 1933 – January 3, 1935	3rd	Elected in 1932. Lost re-election to Brewster.
Charles W. Walton	Republican	March 4, 1861 – May 26, 1862	2nd	Elected in 1860. Resigned to become Associate Justice of the Maine Supreme Judicial Court.
Israel Washburn Jr.	Whig	March 4, 1851 – March 3, 1853	6th	Elected in 1850. Redistricted to the 5th district.
Israel Washburn Jr.	Whig	March 4, 1853 – March 3, 1855	5th	Redistricted from the 6th district and re-elected in 1852. Switched parties.
Israel Washburn Jr.	Republican	March 4, 1855 – January 1, 1861	5th	Re-elected in 1854 as a Republican. Retired to run for governor and resigned when elected.
Benjamin White	Democratic	March 4, 1843 – March 3, 1845	5th	Elected in 1843. Retired.
Wallace H. White Jr.	Republican	March 4, 1917 – March 3, 1931	2nd	Elected in 1916. Retired to run for U.S. Senator.
Ezekiel Whitman	Federalist	March 4, 1821 – June 1, 1822	2nd	Redistricted from the Massachusetts's 15th district and re-elected in 1820. Resigned.
James S. Wiley	Democratic	March 4, 1847 – March 3, 1849	6th	Elected in 1846. Retired.
Hezekiah Williams	Democratic	March 4, 1845 – March 3, 1849	7th	Elected in 1844. Retired.
William D. Williamson	Democratic-Republican	March 4, 1821 – March 3, 1823	4th	Redistricted from the Massachusetts's 18th district and re-elected in 1821. Redistricted to the 7th district and lost re-election to Kidder.
Joseph F. Wingate	Anti-Jacksonian	March 4, 1827 – March 3, 1831	3rd	Elected in 1826. Retired.
John M. Wood	Republican	March 4, 1855 – March 3, 1859	1st	Elected in 1854. Retired.

== See also ==
- List of United States senators from Maine
- Maine's congressional delegations
- Maine's congressional districts
