= 7th congressional district =

7th congressional district may refer to:

- Alabama's 7th congressional district
- Arizona's 7th congressional district
- Arkansas's 7th congressional district
- California's 7th congressional district
- Colorado's 7th congressional district
- Florida's 7th congressional district
- Georgia's 7th congressional district
- Illinois's 7th congressional district
- Indiana's 7th congressional district
- Iowa's 7th congressional district (defunct)
- Kansas's 7th congressional district (defunct)
- Kentucky's 7th congressional district (defunct)
- Louisiana's 7th congressional district (defunct)
- Maine's 7th congressional district (defunct)
- Maryland's 7th congressional district
- Massachusetts's 7th congressional district
- Michigan's 7th congressional district
- Minnesota's 7th congressional district
- Mississippi's 7th congressional district (defunct)
- Missouri's 7th congressional district
- New Jersey's 7th congressional district
- New York's 7th congressional district
- North Carolina's 7th congressional district
- Ohio's 7th congressional district
- Oklahoma's 7th congressional district (defunct)
- Pennsylvania's 7th congressional district
- South Carolina's 7th congressional district
- Tennessee's 7th congressional district
- Texas's 7th congressional district
- Virginia's 7th congressional district
- Washington's 7th congressional district
- Wisconsin's 7th congressional district

== See also ==
- List of United States congressional districts
