= Joseph Hall (Maine politician) =

American politician

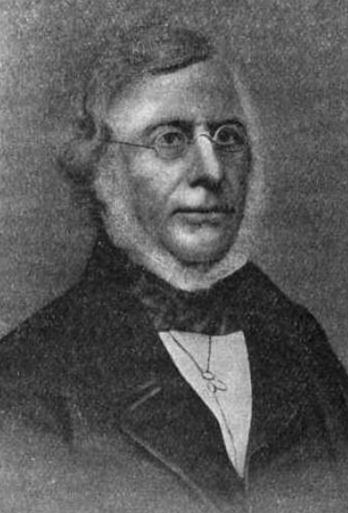

Member of the U.S. House of Representatives from Maine's 6th district
- In office March 4, 1833 – March 3, 1837
- Preceded by: Leonard Jarvis
- Succeeded by: Hugh J. Anderson

Personal details
- Born: June 26, 1793 Methuen, Massachusetts
- Died: December 31, 1859 (aged 66) Boston, Massachusetts
- Party: Jacksonian Democrat
- Occupation: Merchant

Joseph Hall (June 26, 1793 – December 31, 1859) a United States representative from Maine.

Hall was born on June 26, 1793, in Methuen, Massachusetts. He attended the common schools and Andover Academy. He moved to Camden, Maine, in 1809 and engaged in mercantile pursuits. In 1814 (during the War of 1812), he served as ensign in Colonel Forte's regiment, Massachusetts Militia, and was subsequently appointed colonel.

He was appointed deputy sheriff in 1821, became sheriff in 1827, and was appointed postmaster of Camden 1830-1833. He was elected as a Jacksonian Democrat to the Twenty-third and Twenty-fourth Congresses (March 4, 1833 – March 3, 1837) and was chairman of the Committee on Expenditures in the Navy Department in both congresses. Served again as Camden postmaster in 1837 and 1838. He was appointed measurer in the Boston customhouse in 1838 and served until 1846. Was a naval agent at Boston 1846-1849. He was an unsuccessful candidate for mayor of Boston in 1849.

He then engaged in agricultural pursuits 1850-1857. Finally, he became a clerk in the Boston customhouse from 1857 until his death in that city on December 31, 1859. He is interred in Mountain Cemetery, Camden, Maine.

U.S. House of Representatives
Preceded by James Bates	Member of the U.S. House of Representatives from Maine's 7th congressional district 1833-1837	Succeeded by Joseph C. Noyes
