= 1852–53 United States House of Representatives elections =

House elections for the 33rd U.S. Congress

- August 2, 1852 – November 8, 1853

All 234 seats in the United States House of Representatives 118 seats needed for a majority
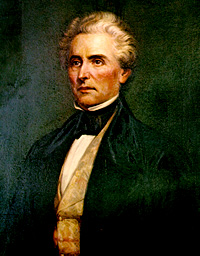

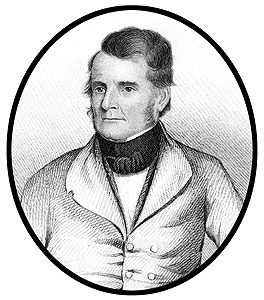
	Majority party	Minority party
Leader	Linn Boyd	Joseph R. Chandler
Party	Democratic	Whig
Leader's seat	Kentucky 1st	Pennsylvania 2nd
Last election	127 seats, 44.85%	83 seats, 41.15%
Seats won	157 (Note: Includes one Benton Democrat, three Southern Democrats, and two Union Democrats)	71 (Note: Includes one Union Whig)
Seat change	▲30	▼14
Popular vote	1,559,070 (Note: The returns from Al-5, Al-7, TN-9, VA-1, VA-4, VA-6, VA-9, VA-10, VA-12, SC-1, SC-2, and SC-3 are incomplete)	1,310,006
Percentage	50.73%	42.62%
Swing	▲5.88 pp	▲1.47 pp
	Third party	Fourth party
Party	Free Soil	Independent
Last election	4 seats, 3.16%	4 seats (Note: Included three Independent Democrats and one Independent Whig.), 1.43%
Seats won	4	2 (Note: Includes one Independent and one Independent Democrat)
Seat change	Steady	▼2
Popular vote	125,959	51,408
Percentage	4.10%	1.67%
Swing	▲0.94 pp	▲0.24 pp
- Results: Democratic gain Whig gain Free Soil gain Democratic hold Whig hold Free Soil hold Independent gain
Speaker before election
Linn Boyd
Democratic
Elected Speaker
Linn Boyd
Democratic

States held the 1852–53 United States House of Representatives elections between August 2, 1852, and November 8, 1853. Each state set a date for its elections to the House of Representatives before the first session of the 33rd United States Congress convened on December 5, 1853.

The Democrats increased their House majority, while the Whigs underperformed. Effects of the Compromise of 1850 temporarily reduced sectional tensions. Both major parties aimed to unify around the 1852 Presidential campaign, but only the Democrats succeeded, electing compromise candidate Franklin Pierce, a Northerner favorable to Southern interests, to the Presidency.

Two small parties, the Union and Southern Rights parties, collapsed, while the Free Soil Party, opposing slavery in the Western territories, retained four seats. One Independent, Caleb Lyon, was elected from New York.

== Election summaries ==
Following the 1850 census, the House was reapportioned. In the initial apportionment bill, the number of seats was unchanged, but later one seat was added to California's delegation, increasing the size of the House to 234 seats.

↓
158	4	1	71
Democratic	FS	I	Whig

State	Type	Date	Total seats		Democratic		Free Soil		Whig		Others	
State	Type	Date	Seats	Change	Seats	Change	Seats	Change	Seats	Change	Seats	Change
Iowa	Districts	August 2, 1852	2	Steady	1	▼1	0	Steady	1	▲1	0	Steady
Missouri	Districts	August 2, 1852	7	▲2	3 (Note: Includes one Benton Democrat)	▲1	0	Steady	4	▲1	0	Steady
Vermont	Districts	September 7, 1852	3	▼1	0	▼1	0	Steady	3	Steady	0	Steady
Maine	Districts	September 13, 1852	6	▼1	3	▼2	0	Steady	3	▲1	0	Steady
Florida	At-large	October 5, 1852	1	Steady	1	▲1	0	Steady	0	▼1	0	Steady
Indiana	Districts	October 12, 1852	11	▲1	10	▲2	0	Steady	1	▼1	0	Steady
Ohio	Districts	October 12, 1852	21	Steady	12	▲1	2	▲1	7	▼2	0	Steady
Pennsylvania	Districts	October 12, 1852	25	▲1	17	▲2	0	Steady	8	▼1	0	Steady
California	At-large	November 2, 1852 (Election Day) (Note: In 1845, Congress passed a law providing for a uniform date for choosing presidential electors (see: Statutes at Large, 28th Congress, 2nd Session, p. 721). Congressional elections were unaffected by this law, but the date was gradually adopted by the states for congressional elections as well.)	2	Steady	2	Steady	0	Steady	0	Steady	0	Steady
Illinois	Districts	November 2, 1852 (Election Day)	9	▲2	5 (Note: Includes 1 Independent Democrat, William Henry Bissell, elected to IL-08.)	▼1	0	Steady	4	▲3	0	Steady
Michigan	Districts	November 2, 1852 (Election Day)	4	▲1	4	▲3	0	Steady	0	▼2	0	Steady
New Jersey	Districts	November 2, 1852 (Election Day)	5	Steady	4	Steady	0	Steady	1	Steady	0	Steady
New York	Districts	November 2, 1852 (Election Day)	33	▼1	21	▲4	1	▲1	10	▼7	1 (Note: Caleb Lyon was elected to NY-23 as an independent.)	▲1 (Note: Backed by the Whigs)
Wisconsin	Districts	November 2, 1852 (Election Day)	3	Steady	3	▲2	0	▼1	0	Steady	0	▼1 (Note: One Independent Democrat)
Delaware	At-large	November 8, 1852	1	Steady	1	Steady	0	Steady	0	Steady	0	Steady
Massachusetts	Districts	November 8, 1852	11	▲1	1	Steady	1	▼1	9	▲2	0	Steady
South Carolina	Districts	February 28 – March 1, 1853	6	▼1	6	▼1	0	Steady	0	Steady	0	Steady
Late elections (after the March 4, 1853 beginning of the term)
New Hampshire	Districts	March 8, 1853	3	▼1	3	▲1	0	Steady	0	▼2	0	Steady
Connecticut	Districts	April 4, 1853	4	Steady	4	▲1	0	Steady	0	▼1	0	Steady
Rhode Island	Districts	April 6, 1853	2	Steady	2	▲1	0	Steady	0	▼1	0	Steady
Virginia	Districts	May 26, 1853	13	▼2	13	Steady	0	Steady	0	▼2	0	Steady
Arkansas	Districts	August 1, 1853	2	▲1	2	▲1	0	Steady	0	Steady	0	Steady
Kentucky	Districts	August 1, 1853	10	Steady	5	Steady	0	Steady	5	Steady	0	Steady
Texas	Districts	August 1, 1853	2	Steady	2	Steady	0	Steady	0	Steady	0	Steady
North Carolina	Districts	August 4, 1853	8	▼1	5	▲2	0	Steady	3	▼3	0	Steady
Tennessee	Districts	August 4, 1853	10	▼1	5	▼2	0	Steady	5	▲1	0	Steady
Alabama	Districts	August 8, 1853	7	Steady	6 (Note: Includes three Southern Rights Democrats and two Union Democrats)	▲2	0	Steady	1 (Note: One Union Whig)	▼1	0	▼1 (Note: Previous election had 1 Union member)
Georgia	Districts	October 3, 1853	8	Steady	6	▲6	0	Steady	2	▲2	0	▼8 (Note: Previous election had 6 Constitutional Union and 2 Southern Rights.)
Louisiana	Districts	November 1, 1853	4	Steady	3	▲1	0	Steady	1	▼1	0	Steady
Maryland	Districts	November 2, 1853	6	Steady	4	▲2	0	Steady	2	▼1	0	▼1 (Note: One Independent Whig)
Mississippi	District + 1 at-large	November 7–8, 1853	5	▲1	5	▲5	0	Steady	0	Steady	0	▼4 (Note: Previous election had 3 Union and 1 Southern Rights.)
Total			234	▲1	158 67.5%	▲28	4 1.7%	Steady	71 30.3%	▼15	1 0.4%	▼12

Popular vote (Note: Manually added from)
Democratic	51.67%
Whig	41.79%
Free Soil	3.96%
Know Nothing (Note: 9,639 votes)	0.38%
Temperance (Note: 396 votes)	0.01%
Union (Note: 381 votes)	0.01%
Independent	1.73%
Unknown (Note: 16,473 votes)	0.52%

House seats
Democratic	67.09%
Whig	30.34%
Free Soil	1.71%
Independent	0.85%

== Alabama ==
District	Incumbent			This race	
District	Member	Party	First elected	Results	Candidates
Alabama 1	John Bragg	Democratic	1851	Incumbent retired. Democratic hold.	▌ ✓ Philip Phillips (Southern Rights Democratic) 50.5%; ▌ E. Lockwood (Union Whig) 49.5%
Alabama 2	James Abercrombie	Whig	1851	Incumbent re-elected	▌ ✓ James Abercrombie (Union Whig) 56.1%; ▌ David Clopton (Democratic) 43.9%
Alabama 3	Sampson Willis Harris	Democratic	1847	Incumbent re-elected	▌ ✓ Sampson Willis Harris (Southern Rights Democratic) 79.8%; ▌ [FNU] Moore (Union Whig) 20.2%
Alabama 4	William Russell Smith	Union	1851	Incumbent re-elected as a Democrat. Democratic gain.	▌ ✓ William Russell Smith (Union Democratic) 34.7%; ▌ Sydenham Moore (Southern Rights Democratic) 33.8%; ▌ Stephen F. Hale (Whig) 31.5%
Alabama 5	George S. Houston	Democratic	1850	Incumbent re-elected	▌ ✓ George S. Houston (Democratic) 95.0%
Alabama 6	Williamson R. W. Cobb	Democratic	1847	Incumbent re-elected	▌ ✓ Williamson R. W. Cobb (Union Democratic) 58.2%; ▌ Clement Claiborne Clay (Democratic) 41.8%
Alabama 7	Alexander White	Whig	1851	Incumbent retired. Democratic gain.	▌ ✓ James F. Dowdell (Southern Rights Democratic) 65.6%; ▌ T. G. Garrett (Union Whig) 34.4%

== Arkansas ==
District	Incumbent			This race	
District	Member	Party	First elected	Results	Candidates
Arkansas 1	Robert W. Johnson; Redistricted from the at-large district	Democratic	1846	Incumbent retired. Democratic hold.	▌ ✓ Alfred B. Greenwood (Democratic) 100.0%
Arkansas 2	Robert W. Johnson; Redistricted from the at-large district	Democratic	1846	New seat. Democratic gain.	▌ ✓ Edward A. Warren (Democratic) 53.2%; ▌Unidentified (Whig) 46.8%

== California ==
Note: From statehood to 1864, California's representatives were elected at-large, with the top two vote-getters winning election from 1849 to 1858; in 1860 when California gained a seat in the House the top three vote-getters were elected.

District	Incumbent			This race	
District	Member	Party	First elected	Results	Candidates
California at-large 2 seats on a general ticket	Edward C. Marshall	Democratic	1851	Incumbent retired. Democratic hold.	▌ ✓ James A. McDougall (Democratic) 84.4%; ▌ ✓ Milton Latham (Democratic) 15.6%; ▌Philip Leget Edwards (Whig) 23.28%; ▌George B. Tingley (Whig) 23.13%
California at-large 2 seats on a general ticket	Joseph W. McCorkle	Democratic	1851	Incumbent lost renomination. Democratic hold.	▌ ✓ James A. McDougall (Democratic) 84.4%; ▌ ✓ Milton Latham (Democratic) 15.6%; ▌Philip Leget Edwards (Whig) 23.28%; ▌George B. Tingley (Whig) 23.13%

== Connecticut ==
District	Incumbent			This race	
District	Member	Party	First elected	Results	Candidates
Connecticut 1	Charles Chapman	Whig	1851	Incumbent lost re-election. Democratic gain.	▌ ✓ James T. Pratt (Democratic) 52.2%; ▌Charles Chapman (Whig) 44.2%; ▌John Hooker (Free Soil) 3.5%
Connecticut 2	Colin M. Ingersoll	Democratic	1851	Incumbent re-elected.	▌ ✓ Colin M. Ingersoll (Democratic) 53.0%; ▌Austin Baldwin (Whig) 42.0%; ▌Walter Booth (Free Soil) 4.9%
Connecticut 3	Chauncey F. Cleveland	Democratic	1849	Incumbent retired. Democratic hold.	▌ ✓ Nathan Belcher (Democratic) 50.4%; ▌Daniel P. Tyler (Whig) 34.8%; ▌Albert G. Stark (Free Soil) 14.8%
Connecticut 4	Origen S. Seymour	Democratic	1851	Incumbent re-elected.	▌ ✓ Origen S. Seymour (Democratic) 54.0%; ▌William W. Welch (Whig) 45.4%; ▌Daniel G. Platt (Free Soil) 0.6%

== Delaware ==
Election was held November 8, 1852.

District	Incumbent			This race	
District	Member	Party	First elected	Results	Candidates
Delaware at-large	George R. Riddle	Democratic	1850	Incumbent re-elected.	▌ ✓ George R. Riddle (Democratic) 50.23%; ▌John W. Houston (Whig) 49.77%

== Florida ==
District	Incumbent			This race	
District	Member	Party	First elected	Results	Candidates
Florida at-large	Edward C. Cabell	Whig	1846	Incumbent lost re-election. Democratic gain.	▌ ✓ Augustus Maxwell (Democratic) 50.1%; ▌Edward C. Cabell (Whig) 49.9%

== Georgia ==
District	Incumbent			This race	
District	Member	Party	First elected	Results	Candidates
Georgia 1	Joseph W. Jackson	Southern Rights	1850	Incumbent retired. Democratic gain.	▌ ✓ James Lindsay Seward (Democratic) 51.1%; ▌ [FNU] Barton (Whig) 48.9%
Georgia 2	James Johnson	Constitutional Union	1851	Incumbent lost re-election as a Whig. Democratic gain.	▌ ✓ Alfred H. Colquitt (Democratic) 52.1%; ▌ James Johnson (Whig) 47.9%
Georgia 3	Jack Bailey	Southern Rights	1851	Incumbent re-elected as a Democrat. Democratic gain.	▌ ✓ Jack Bailey (Democratic) 50.0%; ▌ Robert P. Trippe (Whig) 50.0%
Georgia 4	Charles Murphey	Constitutional Union	1851	Incumbent retired. Democratic gain.	▌ ✓ William B. W. Dent (Democratic) 51.3%; ▌ James Calhoun (Whig) 48.7%
Georgia 5	Elijah W. Chastain	Constitutional Union	1851	Incumbent re-elected as a Democrat. Democratic gain.	▌ ✓ Elijah W. Chastain (Democratic) 50.8%; ▌ Lewis Tumlin (Democratic) 49.2%
Georgia 6	Junius Hillyer	Constitutional Union	1851	Incumbent re-elected as a Democrat. Democratic gain.	▌ ✓ Junius Hillyer (Democratic) 64.8%; ▌ [FNU] Wofld (Democratic) 35.2%
Georgia 7	None (new district)			New seat. Whig gain.	▌ ✓ David A. Reese (Whig) 56.3%; ▌ [FNU] Saffold (Democratic) 43.7%
Georgia 8	Alexander H. Stephens; Redistricted from the 7th district	Constitutional Union	1843	Incumbent re-elected as a Whig. Whig gain.	▌ ✓ Alexander H. Stephens (Whig) 69.7%; ▌ [FNU] Jones (Democratic) 30.3%
Georgia 8	Robert Toombs	Constitutional Union	1844	Incumbent retired. Constitutional Union loss.	▌ ✓ Alexander H. Stephens (Whig) 69.7%; ▌ [FNU] Jones (Democratic) 30.3%

== Illinois ==
District	Incumbent			This race	
District	Member	Party	First elected	Results	Candidates
Illinois 1	Thompson Campbell Redistricted from the 6th district	Democratic	1850	Incumbent lost re-election. Whig gain.	▌ ✓ Elihu B. Washburne (Whig) 43.9%; ▌Thompson Campbell (Democratic) 42.2%; ▌Newman Campbell (Free Soil) 13.3%
Illinois 2	None (new district)			New seat. Democratic gain.	▌ ✓ John Wentworth (Democratic) 46.7%; ▌ Cyrus Aldrich (Whig) 39.9%; ▌ James H. Collins (Free Soil) 13.3%
Illinois 3	Orlando B. Ficklin	Democratic	1850	Incumbent retired. Whig gain.	▌ ✓ Jesse O. Norton (Whig) 46.0%; ▌ William Reddick (Democratic) 45.0%; ▌J. H. Bryant (Free Soil) 8.9%
Illinois 4	Richard S. Molony	Democratic	1850	Incumbent retired. Whig gain.	▌ ✓ James Knox (Whig) 47.4%; ▌Lewis W. Rop (Democratic) 46.5%; ▌L. W. Curtis (Free Soil) 6.2%
Illinois 5	William Alexander Richardson	Democratic	1847	Incumbent re-elected	▌ ✓ William Alexander Richardson (Democratic) 51.6%; ▌ Orville Browning (Whig) 48.1%
Illinois 6	Richard Yates Sr. Redistricted from the 7th district	Whig	1850	Incumbent re-elected	▌ ✓ Richard Yates Sr. (Whig) 51.1%; ▌John Calhoun (Democratic) 48.9%
Illinois 7	None (new district)			New seat. Democratic gain.	▌ ✓ James C. Allen (Democratic) 54.1%; ▌ Charles C. Constable (Whig) 45.8%
Illinois 8	William Henry Bissell Redistricted from the 1st district	Democratic	1848	Incumbent re-elected as an Independent Democrat. Independent Democratic gain.	▌ ✓ William Henry Bissell (Ind. Democratic) 39.8%; ▌ Joseph Gillespie (Whig) 31.4%; ▌ T. B. Fouke (Democratic) 28.8%
Illinois 9	Willis Allen; Redistricted from the 2nd district	Democratic	1850	Incumbent re-elected	▌ ✓ Willis Allen (Democratic) 98.5%

== Indiana ==
District	Incumbent			This race	
District	Member	Party	First elected	Results	Candidates
Indiana 1	James Lockhart	Democratic	1851	Incumbent retired. Democratic hold.	▌ ✓ Smith Miller (Democratic) 59.0%; ▌ [FNU] Kea (Whig) 41.0%
Indiana 2	None (new district)			New seat. Democratic gain.	▌ ✓ William Hayden English (Democratic) 55.0%; ▌ [FNU] Fergason (Whig) 45.1%
Indiana 3	Cyrus L. Dunham Redistricted from the 2nd district	Democratic	1840	Incumbent re-elected	▌ ✓ Cyrus L. Dunham (Democratic) 52.8%; ▌ [FNU] Marshall (Whig) 47.2%
Indiana 3	John L. Robinson	Democratic	1847	Incumbent retired. Democratic loss.	▌ ✓ Cyrus L. Dunham (Democratic) 52.8%; ▌ [FNU] Marshall (Whig) 47.2%
Indiana 4	None (new district)			New seat. Democratic gain.	▌ ✓ Jim Lane (Democratic) 53.0%; ▌ John H. Farquhar (Whig) 47.0%
Indiana 5	Samuel W. Parker; Redistricted from the 4th district	Whig	1851	Incumbent re-elected	▌ ✓ Samuel W. Parker (Whig) 53.9%; ▌ William Grose (Democratic) 46.2%
Indiana 6	Thomas A. Hendricks; Redistricted from the 5th district	Democratic	1851	Incumbent re-elected	▌ ✓ Thomas A. Hendricks (Democratic) 53.6%; ▌ [FNU] Bradley (Whig) 46.4%
Indiana 6	Willis A. Gorman	Democratic	1849	Incumbent retired. Democratic loss.	▌ ✓ Thomas A. Hendricks (Democratic) 53.6%; ▌ [FNU] Bradley (Whig) 46.4%
Indiana 7	John G. Davis	Democratic	1851	Incumbent re-elected	▌ ✓ John G. Davis (Democratic) 56.3%; ▌ [FNU] Barbour (Whig) 43.7%
Indiana 8	Daniel Mace	Democratic	1851	Incumbent re-elected	▌ ✓ Daniel Mace (Democratic) 54.4% ▌ Robert Gregory (Whig) 45.6%
Indiana 9	Graham N. Fitch	Democratic	1849	Incumbent retired. Democratic hold.	▌ ✓ Norman Eddy (Democratic) 53.7%; ▌ Horace P. Biddle (Whig) 46.3%
Indiana 10	Samuel Brenton	Whig	1851	Incumbent lost re-election. Democratic gain.	▌ ✓ Ebenezer M. Chamberlain (Democratic) 53.5%; ▌ Samuel Brenton (Whig) 46.5%
Indiana 11	None (new district)			New seat. Democratic gain.	▌ ✓ Andrew J. Harlan (Democratic) 54.1%; ▌ [FNU] Wallace (Whig) 45.9%

== Iowa ==
District	Incumbent			This race	
District	Member	Party	First elected	Results	Candidates
Iowa 1	Bernhart Henn	Democratic	1850	Incumbent re-elected	▌ ✓ Bernhart Henn (Democratic) 55.2%; ▌ P. Viele (Whig) 44.8%
Iowa 2	Lincoln Clark	Democratic	1850	Incumbent lost re-election. Whig gain.	▌ ✓ John Parsons Cook (Whig) 55.2%; ▌ Lincoln Clark (Democratic) 47.8%

== Kentucky ==
District	Incumbent			This race	
District	Member	Party	First elected	Results	Candidates
Kentucky 1	Linn Boyd	Democratic	1839	Incumbent re-elected.	▌ ✓ Linn Boyd (Democratic) 57.6%; ▌Jefferson Brown (Independent Democratic) 42.4%
Kentucky 2	Benjamin E. Grey	Whig	1851	Incumbent re-elected.	▌ ✓ Benjamin E. Grey (Whig) 57.6%; ▌Winston Jones Davie (Democratic) 42.4%
Kentucky 3	Presley Ewing	Whig	1851	Incumbent re-elected.	▌ ✓ Presley Ewing (Whig)
Kentucky 4	William Thomas Ward	Whig	1851	Incumbent retired. Democratic gain.	▌ ✓ James Chrisman (Democratic) 50.2%; ▌ Thomas E. Bramlette (Whig) 49.82%
Kentucky 5	James W. Stone	Democratic	1851	Incumbent lost re-election. Whig gain.	▌ ✓ Clement S. Hill (Whig) 50.5%; ▌James W. Stone (Democratic) 49.5%
Kentucky 6	Addison White	Whig	1851	Incumbent retired. Democratic gain.	▌ ✓ John Milton Elliott (Democratic) 53.8%; ▌ Jeremiah S. Pierce (Whig) 46.2%
Kentucky 7	William Preston	Whig	1852	Incumbent re-elected.	▌ ✓ William Preston (Whig) 57.7%; ▌ S. S. English (Democratic) 42.3%
Kentucky 8	John C. Breckinridge	Democratic	1851	Incumbent re-elected.	▌ ✓ John C. Breckinridge (Democratic) 52.1%; ▌ Robert P. Letcher (Whig) 47.9%
Kentucky 9	John Calvin Mason	Democratic	1849	Incumbent retired. Whig gain.	▌ ✓ Leander Cox (Whig) 52.5%; ▌ James M. Rice (Democratic) 47.5%
Kentucky 10	Richard H. Stanton	Democratic	1849	Incumbent re-elected.	▌ ✓ Richard H. Stanton (Democratic) 51.8%; ▌ George Baird Hodge (Whig) 48.3%

== Louisiana ==
District	Incumbent			This race	
District	Member	Party	First elected	Results	Candidates
Louisiana 1	Louis St. Martin	Democratic	1850	Incumbent retired. Democratic hold.	▌ ✓ William Dunbar (Democratic) 62.8%; ▌ Charles Gayarré (Independent Democratic) 37.2%
Louisiana 2	Joseph Aristide Landry	Whig	1850	Incumbent retired. Whig hold.	▌ ✓ Theodore G. Hunt (Whig) 54.6%; ▌ [FNU] Davis (Democratic) 45.4%
Louisiana 3	Alexander G. Penn	Democratic	1850	Incumbent retired. Democratic hold.	▌ ✓ John Perkins Jr. (Democratic) 56.7%; ▌ [FNU] Pond (Whig) 43.3%
Louisiana 4	John Moore	Whig	1850	Incumbent retired. Democratic gain.	▌ ✓ Roland Jones (Democratic) 56.8% ▌ [FNU] Smith (Whig) 43.2%

== Maine ==
District	Incumbent			This race	
District	Member	Party	First elected	Results	Candidates
Maine 1	Moses Macdonald	Democratic	1850	Incumbent re-elected.	▌ ✓ Moses Macdonald (Democratic) 57.8%; ▌[FNU] Appleton (Whig) 33.4%; ▌William P. Fessenden (Free Soil) 8.5%
Maine 2	John Appleton	Democratic	1850	Incumbent retired. Democratic hold.	▌ ✓ Samuel Mayall (Democratic) 52.6%; ▌Charles J. Gilman (Whig) 42.0%
Maine 3	Robert Goodenow	Whig	1850	Incumbent retired. Whig hold.	▌ ✓ E. Wilder Farley (Whig) 36.4%; ▌ [FNU] Kimball (Democratic) 32.6%; ▌ [FNU] Smith (Democratic) 26.8%
Maine 4	Isaac Reed	Whig	1852	Incumbent retired. Whig hold.	▌ ✓ Samuel P. Benson (Whig) 54.4%; ▌ Charles Porter Kimball (Democratic) 33.9%; ▌ [FNU] May (Free Soil) 9.9%
Maine 5	Israel Washburn Jr. Redistricted from the 6th district	Whig	1850	Incumbent re-elected	▌ ✓ Israel Washburn Jr. (Whig) 51.1%; ▌ Hastings Strickland (Democratic) 27.2%; ▌ [FNU] Waterhouse (Democratic) 21.4%
Maine 5	Ephraim K. Smart	Democratic	1850	Incumbent retired. Democratic loss.	▌ ✓ Israel Washburn Jr. (Whig) 51.1%; ▌ Hastings Strickland (Democratic) 27.2%; ▌ [FNU] Waterhouse (Democratic) 21.4%
Maine 6	Thomas J. D. Fuller; Redistricted from the 7th district	Democratic	1848	Incumbent re-elected	▌ ✓ Thomas J. D. Fuller (Democratic) 52.6%; ▌[FNU] Robinson (Whig) 44.2%

== Maryland ==
District	Incumbent			This race	
District	Member	Party	First elected	Results	Candidates
Maryland 1
Maryland 2
Maryland 3
Maryland 4
Maryland 5
Maryland 6

== Massachusetts ==
The elections were held November 8, 1852. However, many of the districts went to a December 13, 1852 second ballot.

District	Incumbent			This race	
District	Member	Party	First elected	Results	Candidates
Massachusetts 1	Zeno Scudder; Redistricted from the 10th district	Whig	1851	Incumbent re-elected on the second ballot.	First ballot (November 8, 1852): ▌Zeno Scudder (Whig) 49.67%; ▌John Pierce (Democratic) 28.60%; ▌Rodney French (Free Soil) 21.73%; Second ballot (December 13, 1852): ▌ ✓ Zeno Scudder (Whig) 62.91%; ▌Abraham H. Howland (Independent) 37.09%
Massachusetts 2
Massachusetts 3
Massachusetts 4
Massachusetts 5
Massachusetts 6
Massachusetts 7
Massachusetts 8
Massachusetts 9
Massachusetts 10
Massachusetts 11

== Michigan ==
District	Incumbent			This race	
District	Member	Party	First elected	Results	Candidates
Michigan 1	Ebenezer J. Penniman	Whig	1850	Incumbent retired. Democratic gain.	▌ ✓ David Stuart (Democratic) 50.4%; ▌William A. Howard (Whig) 46.6%; ▌Samuel W. Dexter (Free Soil) 3.0%
Michigan 2	Charles E. Stuart	Democratic	1847 (special); 1848 (lost); 1850	Incumbent retired to run for U.S. Senator. Democratic hold.	▌ ✓ David A. Noble (Democratic) 51.7%; ▌Joseph R. Williams (Whig) 48.3%
Michigan 3	James L. Conger	Whig	1850	Incumbent retired. Democratic gain.	▌ ✓ Samuel Clark (Democratic) 49.4%; ▌Henry R. Williams (Whig) 45.7%; ▌Uriah Upjohn (Free Soil) 4.9%
Michigan 4	None (New seat)			New seat. Democratic gain.	▌ ✓ Hestor L. Stevens (Democratic) 51.8%; ▌George Bradley (Whig) 43.1%; ▌Ephraim Calkins (Free Soil) 5.1%

== Mississippi ==
Elections held late, from November 7 to 8, 1853

District	Incumbent			This race	
District	Member	Party	First elected	Results	Candidates
Mississippi at-large	None (new district)			New seat. Democratic gain.	▌ ✓ William Barksdale (Democratic) 54.27%; ▌Alexander B. Bradford (Whig) 45.73%
Mississippi 1	Benjamin D. Nabers	Union	1851	Incumbent lost re-election as a Whig. Democratic gain.	▌ ✓ Daniel B. Wright (Democratic) 51.64%; ▌Benjamin D. Nabers (Whig) 48.36%
Mississippi 2	John A. Wilcox	Union	1851	Incumbent lost re-election as a Whig. Democratic gain.	▌ ✓ William S. Barry (Democratic) 50.73%; ▌John A. Wilcox (Whig) 49.27%
Mississippi 3	John D. Freeman	Union	1851	Incumbent retired. Democratic gain.	▌ ✓ Otho R. Singleton (Democratic) 55.65%; ▌Alexander K. McLung (Whig) 44.35%
Mississippi 4	Albert G. Brown	Southern Rights	1847	Incumbent retired. Democratic gain.	▌ ✓ Wiley P. Harris (Democratic) 100%

== Tennessee ==
Elections held late, on August 4, 1853.

District	Incumbent			This race	
District	Member	Party	First elected	Results	Candidates
Tennessee 1	Andrew Johnson	Democratic	1842	Incumbent retired to run for Governor. Democratic loss.	▌ ✓ Brookins Campbell (Democratic) 37.11%; ▌Nathaniel G. Taylor (Whig) 36.14%; ▌Albert G. Watkins (Whig) 26.75%
Tennessee 1	Albert G. Watkins; Redistricted from the 2nd district	Whig	1849	Incumbent lost re-election. Democratic gain.	▌ ✓ Brookins Campbell (Democratic) 37.11%; ▌Nathaniel G. Taylor (Whig) 36.14%; ▌Albert G. Watkins (Whig) 26.75%
Tennessee 2	William M. Churchwell; Redistricted from the 3rd district	Democratic	1851	Incumbent re-elected.	▌ ✓ William M. Churchwell (Democratic) 56.64%; ▌Horace Maynard (Whig) 43.36%
Tennessee 3	None (new district)			New seat. Democratic gain.	▌ ✓ Samuel A. Smith (Democratic) 55.49%; ▌T. Nixon Vandyke (Whig) 44.52%
Tennessee 4	John H. Savage	Democratic	1849	Incumbent retired. Democratic loss.	▌ ✓ William Cullom (Whig) 50.14%; ▌Erasmus L. Gardner (Democratic) 49.86%
Tennessee 4	William Cullom; Redistricted from the 8th district	Whig	1851	Incumbent re-elected.	▌ ✓ William Cullom (Whig) 50.14%; ▌Erasmus L. Gardner (Democratic) 49.86%
Tennessee 5	None (new district)			New seat. Whig gain.	▌ ✓ Charles Ready (Whig) 57.86%; ▌Thomas Barry (Democratic) 42.14%
Tennessee 6	William H. Polk	Independent; Democratic	1851	Incumbent retired. Independent Democratic loss.	▌ ✓ George W. Jones (Democratic) 100%
Tennessee 6	George W. Jones; Redistricted from the 5th district	Democratic	1842	Incumbent re-elected.	▌ ✓ George W. Jones (Democratic) 100%
Tennessee 7	Meredith P. Gentry	Whig	1845	Incumbent retired. Whig hold.	▌ ✓ Robert M. Bugg (Whig) 52.52%; ▌S. C. Pavott (Democratic) 47.48%
Tennessee 8	None (new district)			New seat. Whig gain.	▌ ✓ Felix Zollicoffer (Whig) 52.96%; ▌Samuel P. Allison (Democratic) 47.04%
Tennessee 9	Isham G. Harris	Democratic	1849	Incumbent retired. Democratic loss.	▌ ✓ Emerson Etheridge (Whig) 96.90%; ▌Christopher H. Williams (Whig) 3.10%
Tennessee 9	Christopher H. Williams; Redistricted from the 11th district	Whig	1849	Incumbent lost re-election. Whig hold.	▌ ✓ Emerson Etheridge (Whig) 96.90%; ▌Christopher H. Williams (Whig) 3.10%
Tennessee 10	Frederick P. Stanton	Democratic	1845	Incumbent re-elected.	▌ ✓ Frederick P. Stanton (Democratic) 50.03%; ▌Edwin M. Yerger (Whig) 49.97%

== Vermont ==
District	Incumbent			This race	
District	Member	Party	First elected	Results	Candidates
Vermont 1	James Meacham; Redistricted from the 3rd district	Whig	1849 (special)	Incumbent re-elected.	▌ ✓ James Meacham (Whig) 56.0%; ▌John Pierpoint (Free Soil) 23.1%; ▌Philip C. Tucker (Democratic) 20.6%
Vermont 1	Ahiman Louis Miner	Whig	1850	Incumbent retired. Whig loss.	▌ ✓ James Meacham (Whig) 56.0%; ▌John Pierpoint (Free Soil) 23.1%; ▌Philip C. Tucker (Democratic) 20.6%
Vermont 2	William Hebard	Whig	1848	Incumbent retired. Whig hold.	▌ ✓ Andrew Tracy (Whig) 51.8%; ▌Daniel Kellogg (Democratic) 17.9%; ▌Ryland Fletcher (Free Soil) 16.3%
Vermont 3	None (new district)			New seat. Whig gain.	First ballot: ▌Alvah Sabin (Whig) 45.7%; ▌Henry Adams (Democratic) 30.8%; ▌A. Judson Rowell (Free Soil) 23.4%; Second ballot: ▌ ✓ Alvah Sabin (Whig) 48.3%; ▌William Heywood Jr. (Democratic) 32.2%; ▌Charles D. Kasson (Free Soil) 19.4%
Vermont 4	Thomas Bartlett Jr.	Democratic	1850	Incumbent retired. District eliminated. Democratic loss.	None

== Virginia ==
District	Incumbent			This race	
District	Member	Party	First elected	Results	Candidates
Virginia 1	Thomas H. Bayly; Redistricted from the 7th district	Democratic	1844 (special)	Incumbent re-elected.	▌ ✓ Thomas H. Bayly (Democratic) 58.9%; ▌Louis H. C. Finney (Unknown) 39.9%; ▌George W. Lewis (Unknown) 1.1%
Virginia 2	John Millson; Redistricted from the 1st district	Democratic	1849	Incumbent re-elected.	▌ ✓ John Millson (Democratic) 56.7%; ▌Jonathan R. Chambliss (Whig) 36.6%; ▌William D. Roberts (Democratic) 6.7%
Virginia 3	Thomas H. Averett	Democratic	1849	Incumbent lost renomination. Democratic loss.	▌ ✓ John Caskie (Democratic) 54.9%; ▌Clayton G. Coleman (Whig) 45.1%
Virginia 3	John Caskie; Redistricted from the 6th district	Democratic	1851	Incumbent re-elected.	▌ ✓ John Caskie (Democratic) 54.9%; ▌Clayton G. Coleman (Whig) 45.1%
Virginia 4	Richard Kidder Meade; Redistricted from the 2nd district	Democratic	1847 (special)	Incumbent retired. Democratic hold.	▌ ✓ William Goode (Democratic) 65.3%; ▌Wyatt Cardwell (Whig) 18.4%; ▌William C. Flournoy (Unknown) 14.6%; ▌William S. Scott (Unknown) 1.7%
Virginia 5	Thomas S. Bocock; Redistricted from the 4th district	Democratic	1847	Incumbent re-elected.	▌ ✓ Thomas S. Bocock (Democratic) 51.7%; ▌John T. Wootton (Whig) 43.1%; ▌Thomas H. Averett (Independent) 5.1%
Virginia 6	Paulus Powell; Redistricted from the 5th district	Democratic	1849	Incumbent retired. Democratic hold.	▌ ✓ Paulus Powell (Democratic) 52.5%; ▌Alexander Mosely (Whig) 47.5%
Virginia 7	James F. Strother; Redistricted from the 9th district	Whig	1851	Incumbent lost renomination. Democratic gain.	▌ ✓ William Smith (Democratic) 51.8%; ▌Edgar Snowden Sr. (Whig) 48.2%
Virginia 8	Alexander Holladay	Democratic	1849	Incumbent retired. Democratic loss.	▌ ✓ Charles J. Faulkner (Democratic) 52.3%; ▌Alexander Boteler (Whig) 47.7%
Virginia 8	Charles J. Faulkner; Redistricted from the 10th district	Whig	1851	Incumbent re-elected as a Democrat. Democratic gain.	▌ ✓ Charles J. Faulkner (Democratic) 52.3%; ▌Alexander Boteler (Whig) 47.7%
Virginia 9	John Letcher; Redistricted from the 11th district	Democratic	1851	Incumbent re-elected.	▌ ✓ John Letcher (Democratic) 74.4%; ▌Tyre Maupin (Whig) 25.6%
Virginia 10	None (new district)			New district. Democratic gain.	▌ ✓ Zedekiah Kidwell (Democratic) 100%
Virginia 11	None (new district)			New district. Democratic gain.	▌ ✓ John F. Snodgrass (Democratic) 40.3%; ▌Charles S. Lewis (Democratic) 38.3%; ▌A. M. Sterett (Whig) 21.4%
Virginia 12	Henry A. Edmundson	Democratic	1849	Incumbent re-elected.	▌ ✓ Henry A. Edmundson (Democratic) 100%
Virginia 13	Fayette McMullen	Democratic	1849	Incumbent re-elected.	▌ ✓ Fayette McMullen (Democratic) 100%
Virginia 14	James M. H. Beale	Democratic	1849	Incumbents retired. Districts eliminated. Democratic loss.	None
Virginia 15	Sherrard Clemens	Democratic	1852 (special)	Incumbents retired. Districts eliminated. Democratic loss.	None

== Wisconsin ==
District	Incumbent			This race	
District	Member	Party	First elected	Results	Candidates
Wisconsin 1	Charles Durkee	Free Soil	1848	Incumbent lost re-election. Democratic gain.	▌ ✓ Daniel Wells Jr. (Democratic) 46.5%; ▌Charles Durkee (Free Soil) 31.9%; ▌Henry S. Durand (Whig) 21.6%
Wisconsin 2	Ben C. Eastman	Democratic	1850	Incumbent re-elected.	▌ ✓ Ben C. Eastman (Democratic) 53.9%; ▌Chauncey Abbott (Whig) 38.7%; ▌James L. Enos (Free Soil) 7.4%
Wisconsin 3	James Duane Doty	Independent; Democratic	1848	Incumbent retired. Democratic gain.	▌ ✓ John B. Macy (Democratic) 55.5%; ▌James McMillan Shafter (Whig) 36.2%; ▌Hiram McKee (Free Soil) 8.3%

== Non-voting delegates ==
District	Incumbent			This race	
District	Delegate	Party	First elected	Results	Candidates
Minnesota Territory	Henry Hastings Sibley	Democratic	1848 (Wis. Territory: special); 1849 (Wis. Territory: eliminated); 1849 (Minn. Territory)	Incumbent retired. New delegate elected. Democratic hold.	▌ ✓ Henry M. Rice (Democratic) 2360 votes; ▌Wilkin (Note: Full name unpublished in source, presumably Alexander Wilkin (Whig)) 728 votes
New Mexico Territory	Richard H. Weightman	Democratic	1851	Incumbent retired. New delegate elected in 1853. Democratic hold.	▌ ✓ Jose Gallegos (Democratic); ▌William Carr Lane (Whig)
Oregon Territory	Joseph Lane	Democratic	1851	Incumbent re-elected.	▌ ✓ Joseph Lane (Democratic); [data missing]

== See also ==
- 1852 United States elections
  - List of United States House of Representatives elections (1824–1854)
  - 1852 United States presidential election
  - 1852–53 United States Senate elections
- 32nd United States Congress
- 33rd United States Congress

== Bibliography ==
- Dubin, Michael J. (March 1, 1998). United States Congressional Elections, 1788-1997: The Official Results of the Elections of the 1st Through 105th Congresses. McFarland and Company. ISBN 978-0786402830.
- Martis, Kenneth C. (January 1, 1989). The Historical Atlas of Political Parties in the United States Congress, 1789-1989. Macmillan Publishing Company. ISBN 978-0029201701.
- Moore, John L., ed. (1994). Congressional Quarterly's Guide to U.S. Elections (Third ed.). Congressional Quarterly Inc. ISBN 978-0871879967.
- "Party Divisions of the House of Representatives* 1789–Present". Office of the Historian, House of United States House of Representatives.
