= Leonard Jarvis =

American businessman and politician (1781–1854)

Leonard Jarvis, Jr.

Member of the U.S. House of Representatives from Maine
- In office March 4, 1829 – March 3, 1837
- Preceded by: Jeremiah O'Brien (6th); James Bates (7th)
- Succeeded by: Joseph Hall (6th); Joseph C. Noyes (7th)
- Constituency: 6th district (1829-33); 7th district (1833-37)

Personal details
- Born: October 19, 1781 Boston, Massachusetts
- Died: September 18, 1854 (aged 73) Surry, Maine
- Resting place: Hillside Cemetery
- Party: Jacksonian
- Spouse(s): Mary Hubbard Greene, Anna Howard Spooner
- Education: Harvard

Coat of Arms of Leonard Jarvis

Leonard Jarvis, Jr. (October 19, 1781 – September 18, 1854) was an American businessman and politician who served as a member of the United States House of Representatives from Maine. Jarvis was the son of Leonard Jarvis, Sr. and Susan (Scott) Jarvis, he was born in Boston, Massachusetts on October 19, 1781. He attended the common schools, graduated from Harvard in 1800. After his graduation from Harvard, Jarvis moved to France, he lived in France for the next sixteen years. In 1816, he moved to Surry, Maine. On August 15, 1816, he married Mary Hubbard Greene in Boston, Massachusetts, she died in November 1841. In about 1844, he married Anna Howard Spooner, (she died in 1888 or 1889 in California at the age of one hundred and one).

He was the sheriff of Hancock County, Maine from 1821 to 1829. He was a collector of customs for the Penobscot district from 1829 to 1831.

He was elected as a Jacksonian to the Twenty-first Congress and the three succeeding Congresses. He served from March 4, 1829 to March 3, 1837. During the Twenty-fourth Congress, he was the chairman of the United States House Committee on Naval Affairs. In 1835, Jarvis challenged Francis O. J. Smith to a duel, Smith declined.

He was a Navy agent for the port of Boston from 1838 to 1841.

== Death and burial ==
He returned to Surry, Maine, where he died on September 18, 1854. He was interred in Hillside Cemetery. He is buried at Columbia Masonic Cemetery, where the Hillside Cemetery was moved to in 1855.

- United States Congress. "Leonard Jarvis (id: J000062)". Biographical Directory of the United States Congress.

== Notes ==
U.S. House of Representatives
Preceded by Jeremiah O'Brien	Member of the U.S. House of Representatives from Maine's 6th congressional district March 4, 1829 - March 3, 1837	Succeeded by Hugh J. Anderson
Political offices
Preceded by	Sheriff of Hancock County, Maine; 1821–1829	Succeeded by
Preceded by	Member of the Constitutional Convention of 1819-1820; 1819-1820	Succeeded by
