= James L. Enos =

Teacher union pioneer (1825–1903)

- Born: James Lysander Enos; September 19, 1825; Lysander, New York, U.S.
- Died: 1903; Florida, U.S.
- Occupations: Teacher, newspaper publisher, physician
- Spouse: Adelia Frances Hyde (m. 1850)

James Lysander Enos (September 19, 1825 – 1903) was a teacher and newspaper publisher in Iowa.

== Early life and education ==
Enos was born in Lysander, New York on September 19, 1825. At age 15, he started studying medicine with W. W. Day in New York City, but gave it up to go into teaching instead. He attended the Albany Normal School in Albany, New York, graduating in 1845 in the school's inaugural class. He studied under David Perkins Page.

== Career ==
Enos first began his editing career with Northwestern Educator in Chicago in 1849. He moved to Janesville, Wisconsin where he married Adelia Frances Hyde in 1850. In the same year, he became principal of a school in Madison, Wisconsin, its "first professionally trained teacher". His 1851 mathematics textbook, An intellectual and practical arithmetic; or, First lessons in arithmetical analysis. Intended as an introduction to Dodd's arithmetic, lists his address as Madison. He was a candidate for Wisconsin's 2nd congressional district in the 1852 election, for the Free Soil Party, but did not win. He remained in Madison as the school principal until 1853.

He lived briefly in New York City before moving again to Cedar Rapids, Iowa in 1854, where he began teaching school and in 1854, he purchased the local newspaper, the Cedar Valley Farmer, changed its name to the Cedar Valley Times, and became its editor and publisher. He was also the town's physician, and earned a medical degree in 1858 from the University of Kentucky.

He became president of the Iowa State Teachers' Association in 1856 and founded another educational periodical, The Voice of Iowa, in early 1857. Later in 1857 he attended the first gathering of the National Teachers Association, the predecessor to the National Education Association, and was elected as the NTA's first president. His wife died at the age of 30.

Enos continued in publishing newspapers and periodicals for some time before moving to Florida in 1884 and incorporating a new town using his last name. Located to the south of Titusville, it had a population of 50 in 1889. He grew citrus trees and served as the town's postmaster until his death in 1903.
