= List of mayors of Calais, Maine =

The following is a list of mayors of the city of Calais, Maine, United States.

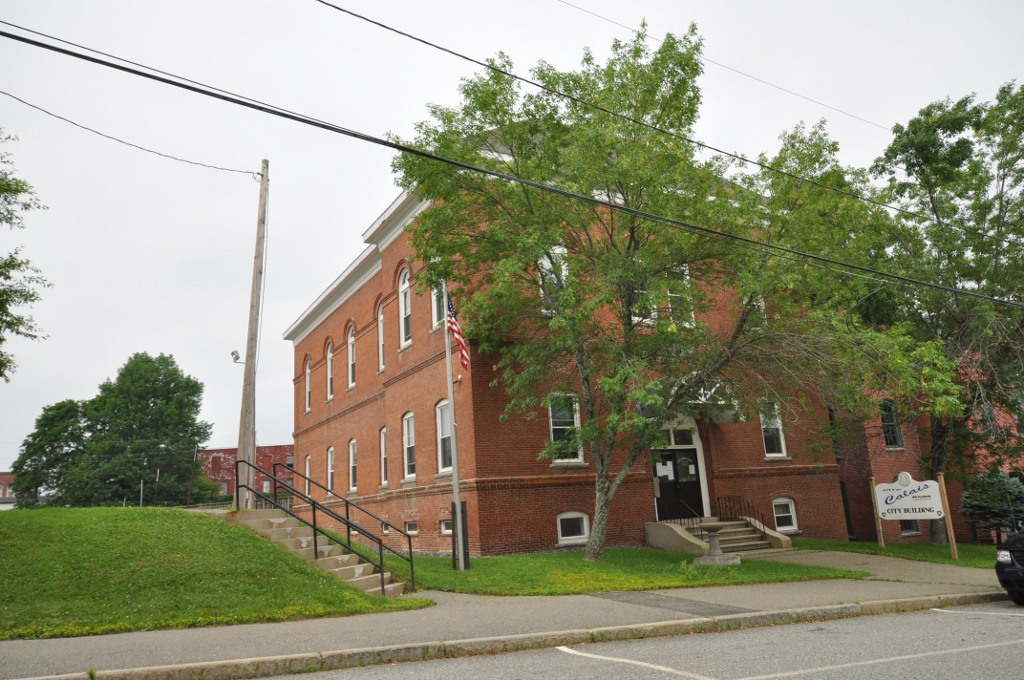
View of city hall building in Calais, Maine, 2013

- Geo. Downes, 1850–1851, 1859
- Frederick A. Pike, 1852
- W. H. Tyler, 1853-1854
- W. D. Lawrence, 1855-1858
- D. K. Chase, 1859-1861
- Joseph Granger, 1862-1863
- C. R. Whidden, 1864-1865
- F. Williams, 1866-1867
- S. T. King, 1868
- J. S. Hall, 1869
- G. M. Wentworth, 1870-1871
- Wm. Duren, 1872-1875
- L. G. Downes, 1876
- P. M. Pirington, 1877
- W. H. Boardman, 1878-1882
- John G. Murchie, 1883-1884
- Geo. M. Hanson, 1885, 1905
- M. N McKusick, 1886–1888, 1906-1907
- C. A. McCullough, 1889-1891
- George A. Murchie, 1892-1896
- Charles E. Swan, 1897-1898
- Oliver S. Tarbox, 1899-1900
- Brono Kalish, 1901
- J. M. Johnson, 1902-1904
- Wm. J. Fowler, 1908-1910
- Herbert J. Dudley, 1911-1912
- Ralph T. Horton, 1913-1914
- Jas. S. McCrea, 1915-1916
- Walter N. Miner, 1917-1918
- Percy L. Lord, 1919
- Fred V. Pickard, 1920
- William J. Fowler, 1921-1925
- Ernest A. Woodman 1926–1928, 1944
- Ned H. Murchie, ca.1929-1933
- Edward J. Corrigan, ca.1934
- Clarence B. Beckett, ca.1935
- Thomas J. Doyle, ca.1937
- Guy L. Thomas, ca.1938
- Joseph Cassidy, ca.2010
- Marianne Moore, ca.2015
- Billy Howard, ca.2018-2021
- Arthur Mingo, ca.2024

== See also ==
- Calais history
