= Hezekiah Williams =

American politician (1798–1856)

Hezekiah Williams (July 28, 1798 – October 23, 1856) was a United States representative from Maine. He was born near Woodstock, Vermont. Pursuing higher education, he graduated from Dartmouth College, in Hanover, New Hampshire in 1820. He studied law, was admitted to the bar, and commenced practice in Castine, Maine in 1825.

Williams was a register of probate for Hancock County, Maine 1824-1838 and a selectman of Castine 1833–1835. He was a trustee of the school fund in 1834 and a member of school committee in 1840. He served in the Maine Senate 1839-1841 and again a selectman of Castine in 1843 and 1844.

Williams was elected as a Democrat to the Twenty-ninth and Thirtieth Congresses (March 4, 1845 – March 3, 1849). After leaving Congress, he resumed the practice of law. He died in Castine, Maine, in 1856 and was buried in Castine Cemetery.

U.S. House of Representatives
Preceded by Shepard Cary	Member of the U.S. House of Representatives from Maine's 7th congressional district 1845-1849	Succeeded by Thomas Fuller
