= David Kidder =

American politician

Member of the U.S. House of Representatives from Maine's 7th district
- In office March 4, 1823 – March 3, 1827
- Preceded by: Enoch Lincoln
- Succeeded by: Samuel Butman

Personal details
- Born: December 8, 1787 Pownalborough, Massachusetts
- Died: November 1, 1860 (aged 72) Skowhegan, Maine

David Kidder (December 8, 1787 – November 1, 1860) was an American politician and a member of the United States House of Representatives from Maine.

Kidder was born on December 8, 1787, in Pownalborough, Massachusetts (now known as Dresden, Maine). He pursued classical studies with private tutors, studied law, was admitted to the bar, and commenced practice in Bloomfield. He moved to Skowhegan in 1817, and then to Norridgewock in 1821. He was a prosecuting attorney of Somerset County from 1811 to 1823.

Kidder was elected as an Adams-Clay Democratic-Republican to the Eighteenth Congress and re-elected as an Adams candidate to the Nineteenth Congress. He served from March 4, 1823, to March 3, 1827. He was not a candidate for renomination in 1826. He returned to Skowhegan in 1827 and returned to the practice of law. He was a member of the Maine House of Representatives in 1829. He died in Skowhegan, Maine, on November 1, 1860. He was interred in Bloomfield Cemetery.

== Sources ==
- United States Congress. "David Kidder (id: K000163)". Biographical Directory of the United States Congress.

U.S. House of Representatives
Preceded by Enoch Lincoln	Member of the U.S. House of Representatives from Maine's 7th congressional district 1823-1827	Succeeded by Samuel Butman
