= Shepard Cary =

American politician (1805–1866)

Member of the U.S. House of Representatives from Maine's 7th district
- In office May 10, 1844 – March 3, 1845
- Preceded by: Joshua A. Lowell
- Succeeded by: Hezekiah Williams

Personal details
- Born: July 3, 1805 New Salem, Massachusetts, U.S.
- Died: August 9, 1866 (aged 61) Houlton, Maine, U.S.
- Party: Democratic; Liberal

Shepard Cary (July 3, 1805 – August 9, 1866) was a U.S. representative from Maine. He served in the Maine House of Representatives and Maine Senate.

Born in New Salem, Massachusetts, Cary attended the common schools and moved with his parents to Houlton, Maine, in 1822.

He engaged in extensive lumber operations and also in agricultural and mercantile pursuits. He served as member of the Maine House of Representatives in 1832, 1833 from 1839 to 1842, 1848, 1849, and 1862, and in the Maine State Senate in 1843 and from 1850 to 1853.

Cary was elected as a Democrat to the Twenty-eighth Congress. He took his seat on May 10, 1844, and served until March 3, 1845. He was the Liberal (anti-Maine Law, not to be confused with the Liberty Party) candidate for governor in 1854.

Cary died in Houlton, Maine on August 9, 1866, and was interred in Evergreen Cemetery.

U.S. House of Representatives
Preceded by Joshua A. Lowell	Member of the U.S. House of Representatives from Maine's 7th congressional district 1844–1845	Succeeded by Hezekiah Williams
