= Stephen Clark Foster (Maine politician) =

American politician (1799–1872)

Stephen C. Foster
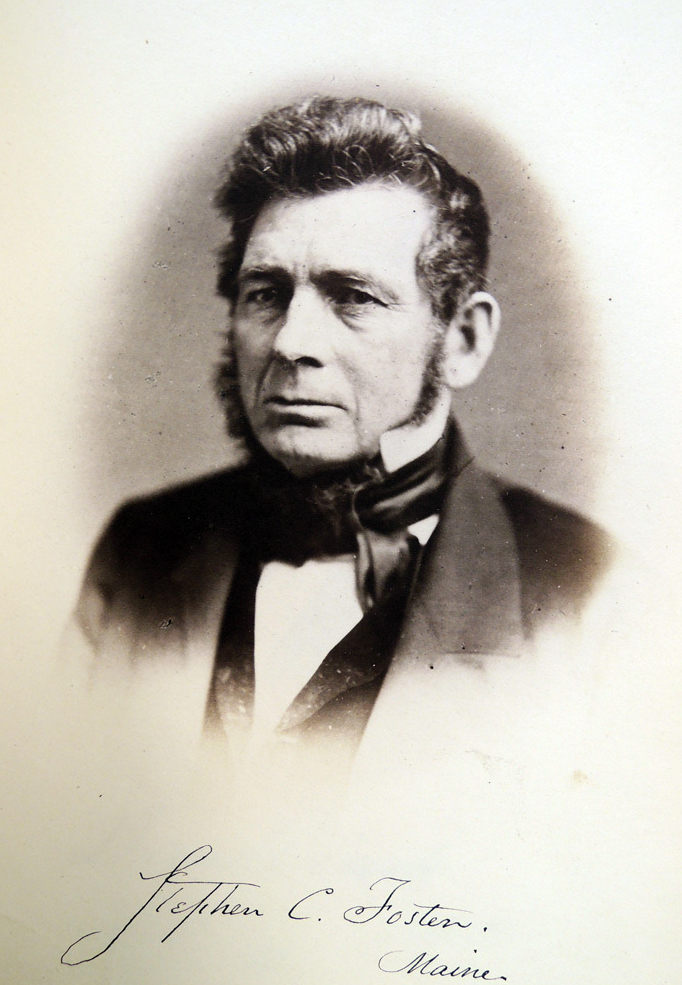

Member of the U.S. House of Representatives from Maine's 6th district
- In office March 4, 1857 – March 3, 1861
- Preceded by: Thomas J. D. Fuller
- Succeeded by: Frederick A. Pike

Member of the Maine House of Representatives

President of the Maine State Senate

Member of the Maine State Senate

Member of the Maine State House of Representatives
- In office 1834–1837

Personal details
- Born: Stephen Clark Foster; December 24, 1799 Machias, Massachusetts (now Maine)
- Died: October 5, 1872 (aged 72) Pembroke, Maine
- Resting place: Forest Hill Cemetery
- Profession: Shipbuilder

Stephen Clark Foster (December 24, 1799 – October 5, 1872) was a United States representative from Maine. He was born in Machias, Massachusetts (now in Maine). He attended the common schools, learned the blacksmith's trade and subsequently became a shipbuilder.

== Biography ==
He was elected as a member of the Maine State House of Representatives, serving from 1834 to 1837. He was then elected as a member of the Maine State Senate in 1840, serving as its president. Later, he was again elected to the Maine House of Representatives in 1847.

=== Congress ===
He was elected as a Republican to the 35th and 36th United States Congress (March 4, 1857 – March 3, 1861).

He was a member of the Peace Convention of 1861 held in Washington, D.C., in an effort to devise means to prevent the impending US Civil War.

=== Death and burial ===
He died in Pembroke, Maine on October 5, 1872. His interment is in Forest Hill Cemetery.

U.S. House of Representatives
| Preceded by Thomas Fuller | Member of the U.S. House of Representatives from Maine's 6th congressional district March 4, 1857 – March 3, 1861 | Succeeded by Frederick A. Pike |
