= Hugh J. Anderson =

American politician (1801–1881)

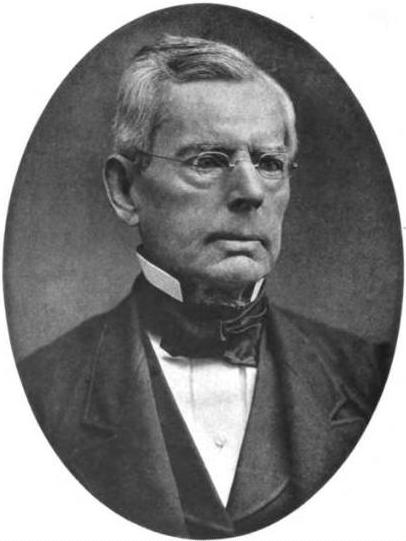

Member of the U.S. House of Representatives from Maine's 6th district
- In office March 4, 1837 – March 3, 1841
- Preceded by: Leonard Jarvis, Jr.
- Succeeded by: Alfred Marshall

20th Governor of Maine
- In office January 3, 1844 – May 12, 1847
- Preceded by: John W. Dana
- Succeeded by: John W. Dana

Personal details
- Born: Hugh Johnston Anderson; May 10, 1801 Wiscasset, Massachusetts, US (now Maine)
- Died: May 31, 1881 (aged 80) Portland, Maine, US
- Party: Democrat

Hugh Johnston Anderson (May 10, 1801 – May 31, 1881) was an American politician. He was a member of the United States Congress from Maine and served as the 20th governor of Maine.

== Early life ==
Hugh J. Anderson was born in Wiscasset (in modern-day Maine, then a part of Massachusetts) on May 10, 1801. He attended the local schools, moved to Belfast, Maine, in 1815, and was employed as a clerk in his uncle's mercantile business.

== Political career ==
In 1827 Anderson was elected clerk of courts for Waldo County. A Democrat, Anderson was elected to the Twenty-fifth and Twenty-sixth Congresses, serving from March 4, 1837, to March 3, 1841. He was not a candidate for reelection to the Twenty-seventh Congress in 1840. From 1844 to 1847 Anderson was the governor of Maine. He was a candidate for U.S. senator in 1847 but subsequently withdrew and moved to Washington D.C., where he served as commissioner of customs in the United States Treasury Department 1853-1858; appointed head of the commission to reorganize and adjust the affairs of the United States Mint at San Francisco, Calif., in 1857; returned to Washington 1859. Sixth Auditor of the Treasury 1866-1869; retired from public life in 1880 and returned to Portland, Maine, where he died May 31, 1881.

== Family ==
His father, John Anderson, was a native of County Down, Ireland; and his grandfather, also John Anderson, was a prominent and influential member of the Scottish Protestant colony in that part of Ireland. His father immigrated to Maine 1793.

Anderson married Martha J. Drummer of Belfast, Maine, in 1832.

The couple had six children:

- John F. Anderson, officer in the Union Army during the American Civil War, attained the rank of brigadier general by brevet.
- Hannah Anderson (no records of marriage found).
- William H. Anderson
- Joseph Anderson
- Horace Anderson (Age 10 in the 1850 census of Belfast, Maine.)
- Thomas Anderson

Two of his sons died before him, and his wife followed him several months after his death. Interment in Grove Cemetery, Belfast, Maine.

Party political offices
Preceded by John Fairfield	Democratic nominee for Governor of Maine; 1843, 1844, 1845	Succeeded by John W. Dana
Political offices
Preceded by John W. Dana	Governor of Maine; 1844-1847	Succeeded by John W. Dana
U.S. House of Representatives
Preceded by Leonard Jarvis, Jr.	Member of the U.S. House of Representatives from Maine's 6th congressional district March 4, 1837 – March 3, 1841	Succeeded by Alfred Marshall
