= Joshua A. Lowell =

American politician (1801–1874)

Member of the U.S. House of Representatives from Maine's 7th district
- In office March 4, 1839 – March 3, 1843
- Preceded by: Joseph C. Noyes
- Succeeded by: Shepard Cary

Personal details
- Born: Joshua Adams Lowell; March 20, 1801 Thomaston, Massachusetts, U.S.
- Died: March 13, 1874 (aged 72) East Machias, Maine, U.S.
- Resting place: Village Cemetery
- Party: Democratic
- Profession: Politician, lawyer

Joshua Adams Lowell (March 20, 1801 – March 13, 1874) was a United States representative from Maine. He was born in Thomaston, Massachusetts (now in Maine) on March 20, 1801. He attended the common schools where he also taught. He studied law, was admitted to the bar and commenced practice in East Machias. He was elected a member of the Maine House of Representatives. He was elected as a Democrat to the Twenty-sixth and Twenty-seventh Congresses (March 4, 1839 – March 3, 1843). He was chairman of Committee on Expenditures in the Post Office Department (Twenty-seventh Congress). He was not a candidate for renomination in 1842. Lowell resumed the practice of law, and died in East Machias on March 13, 1874. His interment was in the Village Cemetery.

U.S. House of Representatives
Preceded by Joseph C. Noyes	Member of the U.S. House of Representatives from Maine's 7th congressional district 1839-1843	Succeeded by Shepard Cary
