= Jeremiah O'Brien (Maine politician) =

American politician (1778–1858)

Member of the U.S. House of Representatives from Maine's 6th district
- In office March 4, 1823 – March 3, 1829
- Preceded by: Joshua Cushman
- Succeeded by: Leonard Jarvis

Member of the Maine House of Representatives
- In office 1832–1834

Member of the Maine State Senate
- In office 1821–1824

Personal details
- Born: January 21, 1778 Machias, Massachusetts (now Maine)
- Died: May 30, 1858 (aged 80) Boston, Massachusetts
- Resting place: O’Brien Cemetery in Machias, Maine
- Party: Democratic-Republican, National Republican
- Occupation: Lumber manufacturing and shipping business

Jeremiah O'Brien (January 21, 1778 – May 30, 1858) was a United States representative from Maine. He was born in Machias, Massachusetts (now in Maine). He attended the common schools.

He then engaged in lumber manufacturing and in shipping. He was elected as member of the Maine State Senate from 1821 to 1824. He was elected as an Adams-Clay Democratic-Republican to the Eighteenth Congress, and reelected as an Adams candidate to the Nineteenth, and Twentieth Congresses (March 4, 1823 – March 3, 1829). He served as chairman for the Committee on Expenditures for the United States Department of the Navy (Nineteenth Congress).

He was an unsuccessful candidate for reelection in 1828 to the Twenty-first Congress. He was a member of the Maine State House of Representatives from 1832 to 1834. He resumed his former lumber manufacturing and shipping business, and died in Boston, Massachusetts on May 30, 1858. His interment is in O’Brien Cemetery in Machias.

U.S. House of Representatives
Preceded by Joshua Cushman	Member of the U.S. House of Representatives from Maine's 6th congressional district March 4, 1823 – March 3, 1829	Succeeded by Leonard Jarvis
Political offices
Preceded by	Member of the Maine House of Representatives; 1832–1834	Succeeded by
Preceded by	Member of the Maine State Senate; 1821–1824	Succeeded by
