= Samuel Butman =

American politician

31st President of the Maine Senate
- In office January 5, 1853 – January 4, 1854
- Preceded by: Noah Prince
- Succeeded by: Luther Moore

Member of the Maine Senate
- In office January 5, 1853 – January 4, 1854 Serving with Franklin Muzzy and Newell Blake
- Succeeded by: Hiram Ruggles
- Constituency: 9th district (Penobscot County)
- In office January 4, 1826 – March 4, 1827
- Preceded by: Joseph Kelsey
- Succeeded by: Solomon Parsons
- Constituency: Penobscot County

Member of the U.S. House of Representatives from Maine's 7th district
- In office March 4, 1827 – March 3, 1831
- Preceded by: David Kidder
- Succeeded by: James Bates

Member of the Maine House of Representatives
- In office January 2, 1822 – January 1, 1823
- Preceded by: Benjamin Shaw
- Succeeded by: Abel Ruggles

Personal details
- Born: April 30, 1788 Worcester, Massachusetts
- Died: October 9, 1864 (aged 76) Plymouth, Maine
- Party: Democratic-Republican (until c. 1826); Anti-Jacksonian (c. 1826‍–‍1834); Whig (1834‍–‍1854); Republican (1854‍–‍1864)
- Spouse: Apphia Blaisdell
- Children: 3, including Samuel G.
- Occupation: Farmer; merchant; politician

Military service
- Battles/wars: War of 1812; Battle of Hampden

Samuel Butman (April 30, 1788 – October 9, 1864) was an American politician from the U.S. state of Maine. A farmer and War of 1812 veteran, Butman served in the Maine State House before entering the U.S. House of Representatives, where he represented Maine's seventh congressional district. Late in life he entered the Maine State Senate, where he served as the chamber's president.

Butman was born in Worcester, Massachusetts, on April 30, 1788. His family moved to Dixmont in present-day Maine (then a region of Massachusetts) in 1805. There his father, an American Revolutionary War veteran, worked as a farmer.

During the War of 1812, Butman served as captain of a militia company that participated in the ill-fated Battle of Hampden. In 1820, he attended the state constitutional convention. Two years later, in 1822, he was elected to the Maine state house, and served that year; he served in the state senate from 1826 to 1827. Butman left the state legislature to serve in the 20th and 21st Congresses (March 4, 1827 – March 3, 1831) in the U.S. House of Representatives as a representative of Maine's seventh district.

In 1846, Butman was county commissioner of Penobscot County. He served one last term in the state senate as a Whig and was elected the body's president in 1853. He died in Plymouth, Maine, on October 9, 1864.

U.S. House of Representatives
Preceded by David Kidder	Member of the U.S. House of Representatives from Maine's 7th congressional district 1827–1831	Succeeded by James Bates
Maine Senate
Preceded by Noah Prince	President of the Maine Senate; 1853–1854	Succeeded by Luther Moore
