= Frederick A. Pike =

American politician

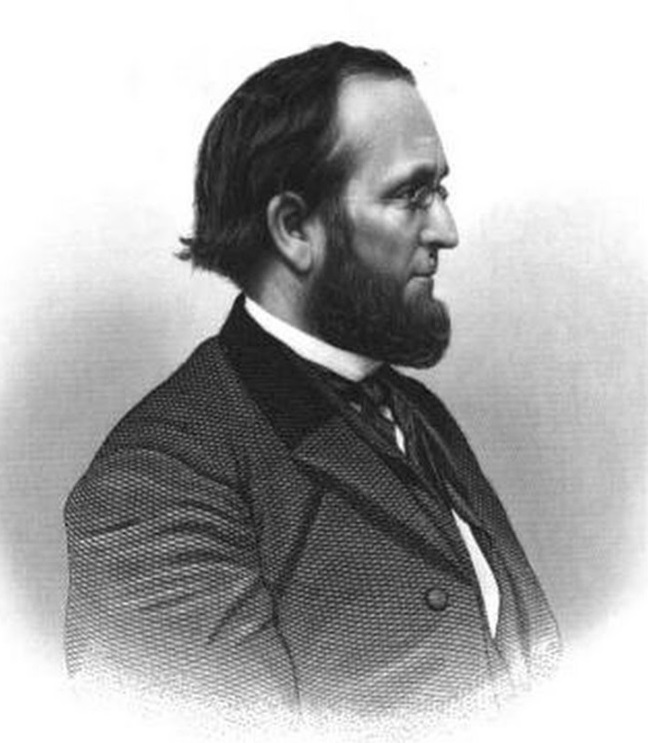
- From Volume 1 (1869) of The Fortieth Congress of the United States: Historical and Biographical

Member of the U.S. House of Representatives from Maine
- In office March 4, 1861 – March 3, 1869
- Preceded by: Stephen C. Foster (6th); John H. Rice (5th)
- Succeeded by: District eliminated (6th); Eugene Hale (5th)
- Constituency: 6th district (1861–63); 5th district (1863–69)

Member of the Maine House of Representatives
- In office 1858–1860

Personal details
- Born: Frederick Augustus Pike; December 9, 1816 Calais, Massachusetts (now Maine)
- Died: December 2, 1886 (aged 69) Calais, Maine
- Resting place: Calais Cemetery
- Spouse: Mary Hayden Green
- Education: Bowdoin College

Frederick Augustus Pike (December 9, 1816 – December 2, 1886) was an American lawyer and politician whowas a U.S. representative from Maine for four terms, from 1861 to 1869.

== Biography ==
Born in Calais, Massachusetts (now in Maine), Pike attended the common schools and the Washington Academy, East Machias, Maine. He was graduated from Bowdoin College, Brunswick, Maine, in 1837. He studied law. He was admitted to the bar and commenced practice in Calais, Washington County, Maine in 1840.

In 1846 he married future American author Mary Hayden Green, daughter of Elijah Dix Green and Hannah Caflin Hayden.

He served as mayor of Calais in 1852 and 1853. He served as member of the State house of representatives 1858–1860 and served as speaker in 1860.

=== Congress ===
Pike was elected as a Republican to the Thirty-seventh and to the three succeeding Congresses (March 4, 1861 – March 3, 1869). He served as chairman of the Committee on Expenditures in the Department of State (Thirty-eighth and Thirty-ninth Congresses), Committee on Naval Affairs (Fortieth Congress). He was an unsuccessful candidate for renomination in 1868. He resumed the practice of law. He was again a member of the State house of representatives in 1870 and 1871.

He was an unsuccessful candidate for election in 1872 to the Forty-third Congress.

=== Death and burial ===
He died in Calais, Maine, December 2, 1886. He was interred in Calais Cemetery.

== See also ==
- List of mayors of Calais, Maine

U.S. House of Representatives
Preceded by Stephen C. Foster	Member of the U.S. House of Representatives from Maine's 6th congressional district 1861–1863	Succeeded by District eliminated
Preceded by John H. Rice	Member of the U.S. House of Representatives from Maine's 5th congressional district 1863–1869	Succeeded by Eugene Hale
