= Alfred Marshall (politician) =

American politician

Member of the U.S. House of Representatives from Maine's 6th district
- In office March 4, 1841 – March 3, 1843
- Preceded by: Leonard Jarvis, Jr.
- Succeeded by: Hannibal Hamlin

Member of the Maine House of Representatives
- In office 1827–1828

Member of the Maine House of Representatives
- In office 1834–1835

Personal details
- Born: c. 1797 New Hampshire
- Died: October 2, 1868 (aged 70–71) China, Maine
- Party: Democratic
- Spouse: Lydia Brackett.
- Children: Isabelle Isaphene Marshall, b. March 9, 1826; d. October 9, 1863. Jacob Smith Marshall, b. May 26, 1828; d. August 21, 1860. John Brackett Marshall, b. December 3, 1831; d. August 11, 1841.

Military service
- Allegiance: United States
- Branch/service: Maine State Militia
- Rank: General

Alfred Marshall (c. 1797 – October 2, 1868) was a United States representative from Maine. He was born in New Hampshire about 1797. Marshall married Lydia Brackett on December 21, 1824, and they had three children Isabelle Isaphene Marshall, Jacob Smith Marshall, and John Brackett Marshall.

He was elected a member of the Maine House of Representatives in 1827, 1828, 1834, and 1835 and served as a general in the Maine State militia.

He was elected as a Democrat to the Twenty-seventh Congress (March 4, 1841 – March 3, 1843). After his return to Maine, he became a collector at Belfast from 1846 to 1849. He engaged in mercantile pursuits and the hotel business. He died in China, Kennebec County on October 2, 1868. He is interred in Village Cemetery.

== Notes ==
U.S. House of Representatives
Preceded by Leonard Jarvis, Jr.	Member of the U.S. House of Representatives from Maine's 6th congressional district March 4, 1841 – March 3, 1843	Succeeded by Hannibal Hamlin
Political offices
Preceded by	Member of the Maine House of Representatives; 1827–1828	Succeeded by
Preceded by	Member of the Maine House of Representatives; 1834–1835	Succeeded by
