= Donald B. Partridge =

American politician

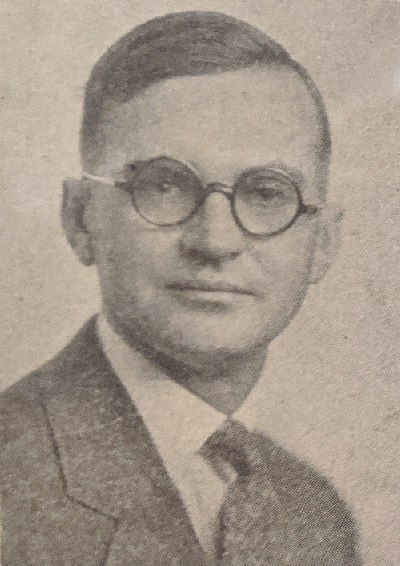
From palm card used in Partridge's 1934 campaign for governor.

Donald Barrows Partridge (June 7, 1891 – June 5, 1946) was an American lawyer, jurist, and politician from the U.S. state of Maine. Partridge served in the United States House of Representatives for a single term in the 1930s and was a Republican Party leader in Oxford County during the 1920s and 30s.

== Biography ==
Partridge was born in Norway, Maine, a town in Oxford County. There he attended the common and high schools, and in 1914 he graduated from Bates College in Lewiston. After graduating he became the principal of the high school in Canton, and held this position until 1918. The following year, he was elected clerk of the supreme judicial court for Oxford County, and served from 1919 to 1931.

He studied law and was admitted to the bar in 1924 and began practicing in his hometown. He served as town clerk from 1924 to 1931 and member of Norway's board of education from 1926 to 1931. He was chairman of the Oxford County Republican committee for six years before elected as a Republican to the 72nd Congress, where he served a single two-year term (March 4, 1931–March 3, 1933). He was not a candidate for renomination in 1932, and returned to the practice of law in Norway after his term ended. In 1934, he was an unsuccessful candidate for the Republican nomination for Governor of Maine. In his later years he was a member of the Maine Industrial Accident Commission.

Partridge died in Portland while on a business trip. He is interred at Norway Pine Grove Cemetery in South Paris, Maine.

U.S. House of Representatives
| Preceded by Wallace H. White, Jr. | Member of the U.S. House of Representatives from Maine's 2nd congressional district 1931–1933 | Succeeded by Edward C. Moran, Jr. |
