= Joseph C. Noyes =

American politician (1798–1868)

Member of the U.S. House of Representatives from Maine's 7th district
- In office March 4, 1837 – March 3, 1839
- Preceded by: Joseph Hall
- Succeeded by: Joshua A. Lowell

Member of the Maine House of Representatives
- In office 1833

Personal details
- Born: Joseph Cobham Noyes; September 22, 1798 Portland, Massachusetts, U.S.
- Died: July 28, 1868 (aged 69) Portland, Maine, U.S.
- Resting place: Evergreen Cemetery
- Party: Whig
- Profession: Politician

Joseph Cobham Noyes (September 22, 1798 – July 28, 1868) was a United States representative from Maine.

== Life ==
Noyes was born in Portland, Massachusetts (now in Maine) on September 22, 1798. He attended the common schools and moved to Eastport, in 1819. There he was a ship chandler and shipper of merchandise.

A member of the State house of representatives in 1833, Noyes was elected as a Whig to the Twenty-fifth Congress (March 4, 1837 – March 3, 1839). He was an unsuccessful candidate for re-election in 1838 to the Twenty-sixth Congress.

Collector of customs for the district of Passamaquoddy, Maine, 1841–1843, Noyes moved back to Portland and engaged in the flour and commission business. He was treasurer of the Portland Co. (locomotive works) in 1859; and one of the founders of the Portland Savings Bank in 1852, serving as treasurer from 1859 until his death in Portland, Cumberland County, Maine, July 28, 1868. He was interred in Evergreen Cemetery.

U.S. House of Representatives
Preceded by Joseph Hall	Member of the U.S. House of Representatives from Maine's 7th congressional district 1837-1839	Succeeded by Joshua A. Lowell
