= Thomas J. D. Fuller =

American politician (1808–1876)

Member of the U.S. House of Representatives from Maine
- In office March 4, 1849 – March 3, 1857
- Preceded by: Hezekiah Williams (7th); Israel Washburn Jr. (6th)
- Succeeded by: District eliminated (7th); Stephen C. Foster (6th)
- Constituency: 7th district (1849–53); 6th district (1853–57)

Personal details
- Born: Thomas James Duncan Fuller; March 17, 1808 Hardwick, Vermont
- Died: February 13, 1876 (aged 67) Upperville, Virginia
- Resting place: Oak Hill Cemetery, Washington, D.C.
- Party: Democratic
- Spouse(s): Elizabeth Titcomb (m. 1836–1840, her death); Jane (Jennie) Elizabeth Doolittle (m. 1869–1876, his death)
- Children: 2
- Profession: Attorney

Thomas James Duncan Fuller (March 17, 1808 – February 13, 1876) was a 19th-century lawyer and politician who served three terms as a United States representative from Maine in the mid-1800s.

== Early life ==
Fuller was born in Hardwick, Vermont, on March 17, 1808. He was the oldest of four children born to Martin Fuller (1780–1816) and Letitia (Duncan) Fuller (1780–1817), and following the deaths of his parents he was raised by relatives while attending the common schools of Caledonia County.

== Start of career ==
Fuller studied law with Isaac Fletcher at the same time as Thomas Bartlett Jr. He was admitted to the bar in 1833 and moved to Calais, Maine, to enter into a law partnership with George M. Chase, who had also studied under Fletcher before moving to Maine. Fuller had been active in the Democratic-Republican Party (then called Republican, later called Democratic) while living in Vermont, and continued that affiliation in Maine. After moving to Maine, Fuller was also active in the state militia, and served as judge advocate of the militia's 7th Division.

== Congressman ==
He was elected as a Democrat to the 31st Congress. He was reelected three times, and served from March 4, 1849, to March 3, 1857. He was chairman of the Committee on Commerce in the 33rd Congress. His opponent James A. Milliken contested Fuller's 1854 reelection, but the House ruled that Fuller was entitled to the seat.

In Congress, Fuller aligned himself with northern Democrats who supported concessions on the slavery question as a way to keep the southern states from seceding. He voted in favor of the Fugitive Slave Act of 1850. He offered an amendment to the Kansas–Nebraska Act which would have left to the territorial legislatures rather than the federal government the decision on whether to allow slavery, in effect allowing slavery north of the Mason–Dixon line. The amendment failed to pass, and Fuller voted against passage of the final bill.

At the same time he advocated for concessions on slavery, Fuller also made contributions to the American Colonization Society, believing that repatriation of slaves to Africa could also be a way to prevent secession. As Maine turned increasingly against slavery and the newly-formed Republican Party gained influence, Fuller was increasingly out of step with his constituents. He was not a candidate for renomination in 1856.

== Later life ==
He was appointed by President James Buchanan as Second Auditor of the Treasury and served from April 15, 1857, to August 3, 1861. He then engaged in the practice of law before the United States Supreme Court and the Court of Claims in Washington, D.C. During the American Civil War, Fuller supported the Union, and was active in the Maine Soldiers' Relief Association.

== Death and burial ==
He died near Upperville, Virginia, on February 13, 1876, after having become ill while visiting his son. His was buried at Oak Hill Cemetery in Washington, D.C.

== Family ==
In 1836, Fuller married Elizabeth Titcomb, who died in 1864. In 1869, he married Jane (Jennie) Elizabeth Doolittle (1840–1923). With his first wife, he was the father of son William (1837–1886), a graduate of the United States Military Academy who served in the Union Army during the American Civil War. His son with his second wife, Thomas J. D. Fuller Jr. (1870–1940), a prominent Washington, DC architect.

U.S. House of Representatives
Preceded by Hezekiah Williams	Member of the U.S. House of Representatives from Maine's 7th congressional district March 4, 1849 – March 3, 1853	Succeeded by District eliminated
Preceded by Israel Washburn Jr.	Member of the U.S. House of Representatives from Maine's 6th congressional district March 4, 1853 – March 3, 1857	Succeeded by Stephen C. Foster
