= James Bates (Maine politician) =

American politician (1789–1882)

Member of the U.S. House of Representatives from Maine's 7th district
- In office March 4, 1831 – March 3, 1833
- Preceded by: Samuel Butman
- Succeeded by: Joseph Hall

Personal details
- Born: September 24, 1789 Greene, District of Maine
- Died: February 25, 1882 (aged 92) Yarmouth, Maine
- Party: Jacksonian

James Bates (September 24, 1789 – February 25, 1882) was an American medical doctor and politician who was United States representative from Maine from 1831 to 1833.

== Early life ==
Bates born in Greene, District of Maine, on September 24, 1789, to Solomon and Mary (Macomber) Bates. His parents moved to Fayette, Maine, when Bates was seven and he attended the common schools there.

== Medicine ==
Bates studied medicine under Dr. Charles Smith in Fayette and Dr. Ariel Mann in Hallowell, Maine. He graduated from Harvard Medical School in March 1813. That same year, he was appointed a surgeon's mate in Denny McCobb's Maine and New Hampshire Volunteer Regiment. In 1814, he became a hospital surgeon's mate in Winfield Scott's brigade and served on the Niagara Frontier. He was present at the Battle of Chippawa, Battle of Lundy's Lane, and the Capture of Fort Erie. In 1815, with the War of 1812 almost ended, he was placed in charge of a military hospital near Buffalo, New York.

Bates left the army in May 1815 and became a partner of Dr. Mann in Hallowell. In 1819, Bates moved to Norridgewock, Maine, where he practiced as a physician and surgeon for 26 years and had a large farm. He was a hospital surgeon during the Aroostook War.

In 1845, Bates was appointed superintendent of the Maine Insane Asylum. In 1850, 27 patients and one employee were killed in a fire at the asylum. In 1851, Bates was sent by Governor John Hubbard to study institutions in other states to find ways the rebuilt asylum could be improved and resigned as the hospital's superintendent.

After completing his report to the Governor, Bates practiced for one year in Gardiner, Maine. He then moved to Fairfield, Maine, where he remained until he relocated to Yarmouth in 1858. He practiced medicine there until the age of 90.

== Politics ==
In 1830, Bates was persuaded to run for public office. He was elected as a Jacksonian to the twenty-second Congress (March 4, 1831 – March 3, 1833). He did not run for reelection.

== Personal life ==
On July 27, 1815, Bates married Mary Jones of Fayette, Maine. They had two sons and three daughters. One of their sons, James M. Bates, became a noted physician.

Bates was a member of the Freemasons and a Congregationalist.

== Later life ==
He died, aged 92, on February 25, 1882, in Yarmouth. His interment is in the Old Oak Cemetery, Norridgewock.

U.S. House of Representatives
Preceded by Samuel Butman	Member of the U.S. House of Representatives from Maine's 7th congressional district 1831-1833	Succeeded by Joseph Hall
