= Joshua Cushman =

American politician (1761–1834)

Member of the U.S. House of Representatives
- In office March 4, 1819 – March 3, 1825
- Preceded by: Joshua Gage
- Succeeded by: Jeremiah O'Brien
- Constituency: Massachusetts 19th (1819–1821); Maine 6th (1821–1823); Maine 4th (1823–1825)

Member of the Massachusetts State Senate
- In office 1832–1834

Member of the Maine House of Representatives
- In office January 1, 1834 – January 27, 1834

Personal details
- Born: April 11, 1761 Halifax, Province of Massachusetts Bay, British America
- Died: January 27, 1834 (aged 72) Augusta, Maine, U.S.
- Party: Democratic-Republican, Adams-Clay Republican
- Spouse: Lucy Jones
- Children: Charles Cushmam
- Education: Harvard College
- Profession: Minister

Military service
- Allegiance: United States
- Branch/service: Continental Army
- Years of service: April 1, 1777 - March 1780
- Battles/wars: American Revolutionary War

Joshua Cushman (April 11, 1761 – January 27, 1834) was a U.S. representative from Massachusetts and from Maine. Born in Halifax in the Province of Massachusetts Bay, Cushman served in the Continental Army from April 1, 1777, until March 1780. He was graduated from Harvard University in 1787, studied theology, was ordained to the ministry and licensed to preach. He was pastor of the Congregational Church in Winslow, Maine for nearly twenty years. He served in the Massachusetts State Senate, and served as member of the Massachusetts House of Representatives.

Cushman was elected as Democratic-Republican from Massachusetts to the Sixteenth Congress (March 4, 1819 – March 3, 1821). When the State of Maine was admitted into the Union, he was also elected as a Democratic-Republican member to the Seventeenth Congress, and reelected as an Adams-Clay Republican to the Eighteenth Congress (March 4, 1821 – March 3, 1825). He died in Augusta, Maine on January 27, 1834. He was interred in a tomb on the State grounds in Augusta.
