= Maine's 6th congressional district =

- Obsolete district
- Created: 1821
- Eliminated: 1863
- Years active: 1821-1863

Maine's 6th congressional district is a former congressional district in Maine. It was created in 1821 after Maine achieved statehood in 1820. It was eliminated in 1863. Its last congressman was Frederick A. Pike.

== List of members representing the district ==
| Member | Party | Years ↑ | Cong ress | Electoral history | District location |
|---|---|---|---|---|---|
District created March 4, 1821
| Joshua Cushman (Winslow) | Democratic-Republican | March 4, 1821 – March 3, 1823 | 17th | Redistricted from Massachusetts's 19th district and re-elected in 1820. Redistricted to the 4th district. | 1821 – 1823; Kennebec County (partial) and Somerset County |
| Jeremiah O'Brien (Machias) | Democratic-Republican | March 4, 1823 – March 3, 1825 | 18th 19th 20th | Elected in 1823 on the third ballot. Re-elected in 1824. Re-elected in 1826. Lost re-election as a Jacksonian. | 1823 – 1833; Hancock County (partial) and Washington County |
| Jeremiah O'Brien (Machias) | Anti-Jacksonian | March 4, 1825 – March 3, 1829 | 18th 19th 20th | Elected in 1823 on the third ballot. Re-elected in 1824. Re-elected in 1826. Lost re-election as a Jacksonian. | 1823 – 1833; Hancock County (partial) and Washington County |
| Leonard Jarvis (Ellsworth) | Jacksonian | March 4, 1829 – March 3, 1833 | 21st 22nd | Elected in April 1830 on the sixth ballot. (Note: Leonard Jarvis was elected to the 1829–1831 term on April 5, 1830, near the end of the Congress.); Re-elected in September 1830. (Note: Leonard Jarvis was re-elected in September 13, 1830 to the 1831–1833 term); Redistricted to the 7th district. | 1823 – 1833; Hancock County (partial) and Washington County |
| Joseph Hall (Camden) | Jacksonian | March 4, 1833 – March 3, 1837 | 23rd 24th | Elected in 1833. Re-elected in 1834. Retired. | 1833 – 1843 [data missing] |
| Hugh J. Anderson (Belfast) | Democratic | March 4, 1837 – March 3, 1841 | 25th 26th | Elected in 1836. Re-elected in 1838. Retired. | 1833 – 1843 [data missing] |
| Alfred Marshall (China) | Democratic | March 4, 1841 – March 3, 1843 | 27th | Elected in 1840. Retired. | 1833 – 1843 [data missing] |
| Hannibal Hamlin (Hampden) | Democratic | March 4, 1843 – March 3, 1847 | 28th 29th | Elected in 1843. Re-elected in 1844. Retired to run for U.S. senator. | 1843 – 1853 [data missing] |
| James S. Wiley (Dover) | Democratic | March 4, 1847 – March 3, 1849 | 30th | Elected in 1846. Retired. | 1843 – 1853 [data missing] |
| Charles Stetson (Bangor) | Democratic | March 4, 1849 – March 3, 1851 | 31st | Elected in 1848. Lost renomination. | 1843 – 1853 [data missing] |
| Israel Washburn Jr. (Orono) | Whig | March 4, 1851 – March 3, 1853 | 32nd | Elected in 1850. Redistricted to the 5th district. | 1843 – 1853 [data missing] |
| Thomas Fuller (Calais) | Democratic | March 4, 1853 – March 3, 1857 | 33rd 34th | Redistricted from the 7th district and re-elected in 1852. Elected in 1854. Retired. | 1853 – 1863 [data missing] |
| Stephen Clark Foster (Pembroke) | Republican | March 4, 1857 – March 3, 1861 | 35th 36th | Elected in 1856. Re-elected in 1858. Retired. | 1853 – 1863 [data missing] |
| Frederick A. Pike (Calais) | Republican | March 4, 1861 – March 3, 1863 | 37th | Elected in 1860. Redistricted to the 5th district. | 1853 – 1863 [data missing] |
District eliminated March 3, 1863

== Bibliography ==
- Martis, Kenneth C. (1989). The Historical Atlas of Political Parties in the United States Congress. New York: Macmillan Publishing Company.
- Martis, Kenneth C. (1982). The Historical Atlas of United States Congressional Districts. New York: Macmillan Publishing Company.
- Congressional Biographical Directory of the United States 1774–present
