= Ebenezer Herrick =

American politician (1785–1839)

Member of the Massachusetts Senate
- In office 1828–1829

Member of the U.S. House of Representatives from Maine
- In office March 4, 1821 – March 3, 1827
- Preceded by: District created
- Succeeded by: Joseph F. Wingate
- Constituency: 5th district (1821–1823); 3rd district (1823–1827)

Member of the Massachusetts House of Representatives
- In office 1819

Personal details
- Born: October 21, 1785 Lewiston, Maine, U.S.
- Died: May 7, 1839 (aged 53) Lewiston, Maine, U.S.
- Party: Democratic-Republican; National Republican
- Children: Anson Herrick

Ebenezer Herrick (October 21, 1785 – May 7, 1839) was a U.S. representative from Maine, father of Anson Herrick.

== Biography ==
Born in Lewiston, Maine (then a district of Massachusetts), Herrick attended the common schools. He studied law, was admitted to the bar and commenced practice in Bowdoinham, Maine. He then engaged in mercantile pursuits 1814–1818. He served as member of the Massachusetts House of Representatives in 1819, served as member of the convention which formed the first constitution of the State of Maine in 1820, and was Secretary of the Maine Senate in 1821.

Herrick was elected as a Democratic-Republican to the Seventeenth Congress, elected as an Adams-Clay Republican to the Eighteenth Congress, and reelected as an Adams candidate to the Nineteenth Congress (March 4, 1821 – March 3, 1827). He declined to be a candidate for reelection in 1826, and served as a member of the Maine Senate. He died in Lewiston on May 7, 1839, and was interred in the Old Herrick Burying Ground.
