= Maine's 7th congressional district =

- Obsolete district
- Created: 1821
- Eliminated: 1853
- Years active: 1821-1853

Maine's 7th congressional district is an obsolete congressional district in the U.S. state of Maine. It was created in 1821 after Maine was admitted to the Union in 1820. The district was eliminated in 1853 following the 1850 census. Its last congressman was Thomas Fuller.

== List of members representing the district ==
Member	Party	Years ↑	Cong ress	Electoral history
District created March 4, 1821
Enoch Lincoln (Paris)	Democratic-Republican	March 4, 1821 – March 3, 1823	17th	Redistricted from Massachusetts's 20th district and re-elected in 1820. Redistricted to the 5th district.
David Kidder (Norridgewock)	Democratic-Republican	March 4, 1823 – March 3, 1825	18th 19th	Elected in 1823. Re-elected in 1824. Retired.
David Kidder (Norridgewock)	Anti-Jacksonian	March 4, 1825 – March 3, 1827	18th 19th	Elected in 1823. Re-elected in 1824. Retired.
Samuel Butman (Dixmont)	Anti-Jacksonian	March 4, 1827 – March 3, 1831	20th 21st	Elected in 1827 on the fourth ballot. Re-elected in 1828. Retired.
James Bates (Norridgewock)	Jacksonian	March 4, 1831 – March 3, 1833	22nd	Elected in 1830. Retired.
Leonard Jarvis (Ellsworth)	Jacksonian	March 4, 1833 – March 3, 1837	23rd 24th	Redistricted from the 6th district and Re-elected in 1833. Re-elected in 1834. Retired.
Joseph C. Noyes (Eastport)	Whig	March 4, 1837 – March 3, 1839	25th	Elected in 1836. Lost re-election.
Joshua A. Lowell (East Machias)	Democratic	March 4, 1839 – March 3, 1843	26th 27th	Elected in 1838. Re-elected in 1840. Retired.
Shepard Cary (Houlton)	Democratic	March 4, 1843 – March 3, 1845	28th	Elected in 1843. Retired.
Hezekiah Williams (Castine)	Democratic	March 4, 1845 – March 3, 1849	29th 30th	Elected in 1844. Re-elected in 1846. Retired.
Thomas Fuller (Calais)	Democratic	March 4, 1849 – March 3, 1853	31st 32nd	Elected in 1848. Re-elected in 1850. Redistricted to the 6th district.
District eliminated March 3, 1853
