= Belmont A. Smith =

American businessman and politician (1874–1951)

Maine State Treasurer
- In office 1937–1943
- Preceded by: Louis H. Winship
- Succeeded by: Joseph H. McGillicuddy

Personal details
- Born: April 2, 1874 Newburgh, Maine, U.S.
- Died: February 23, 1951 (aged 76) Bangor, Maine, U.S.
- Resting place: Mount Hope Cemetery; Bangor, Maine, U.S.
- Party: Republican
- Spouse: Harriett B. Smith (m. 1900)
- Children: 2

Belmont Ashton Smith (April 2, 1874 – February 23, 1951) was an American businessman and politician who was Maine State Treasurer from 1937 to 1943.

== Early life ==
Smith was born in Newburgh, Maine, on April 2, 1874, to James and Jane (Rogers) Smith. He was educated at the Maine Central Institute. On January 12, 1900, he married Harriett B. Smith in Orrington, Maine. They had two sons.

== Business ==
Smith was a salesman for the Thomas Long Company of Boston for several years. He helped established the Smith Company of Corinna, Maine, was a director of the Corinna Trust Company, and was an executive with Blake, Barrows & Brown, an insurance agency.

== Politics ==
Smith was a member of the Maine executive council during the administration of governor Owen Brewster. In 1935, he was a member of the Maine House of Representatives. He was reelected in 1936, but quickly resigned to seek the office of state treasurer, which had been vacant since the death of George S. Foster earlier that year. Smith was unopposed for the Republican nomination and was elected by the Maine Legislature in January 1937. He was reelected in 1939.

In April 1940, state controller William A. Runnells was charged with embezzlement and Governor Lewis O. Barrows demanded the resignations of Runnells, Smith, Maine State Auditor Elbert D. Hayford, deputy state treasurer Louis H. Winship, and state commissioner of finance William S. Owen. Runnells, Hayford, Winship, and Owen immediately resigned, but Smith refused. On May 29, the Maine Senate voted 26 to 3 to hold hearings on whether Smith should be removed from office On June 6, the Senate voted 15–14 and the House voted 69–55 against removing Smith.

Smith ran for a third term in 1941. No other Republicans chose to enter the race, but representative Charles H. Holman nominated Smith's deputy, Everett W. Downs, at the party's caucus. Smith defeated Downs 98 votes to 55. He did not run for reelection in 1943.

== Death ==
Smith died on February 23, 1951 in Bangor, Maine.
