= Edward Sullivan =

Edward Sullivan may refer to:

- Edward Sullivan (Medal of Honor) (1870–1955), Medal of Honor recipient
- Sir Edward Sullivan, 1st Baronet (1822–1885), Lord Chancellor of Ireland
- Edward C. Sullivan (born 1933), former New York state assemblyman
- Edward J. Sullivan (1921–2007), mayor of Cambridge, Massachusetts
- Edward Sullivan (bishop) (1832–1899), Canadian Anglican priest
- Ed Sullivan (1901–1974), American entertainment writer and television host
- Ed Sullivan (unionist), American labor union leader
- Ed Sullivan Jr. (born 1969), Republican member of the Illinois House of Representatives
- J. Edward Sullivan (1879–1951), American politician in Maine

== See also ==
- Ted Sullivan (disambiguation)
- Eddie Sullivan (1941–2000), American professional wrestler
- E. J. Sullivan (Edmund Joseph Sullivan), British book illustrator
