= Louis H. Winship =

American government official (1864–1940)

Maine State Treasurer
- In office 1936–1937
- Preceded by: George S. Foster
- Succeeded by: Belmont A. Smith
- In office 1932–1933
- Preceded by: William S. Owen
- Succeeded by: George S. Foster

Personal details
- Born: 1864 Portland, Maine, U.S.
- Died: July 20, 1940 (aged 76) Augusta, Maine, U.S.
- Resting place: Evergreen Cemetery; Portland, Maine, U.S.
- Party: Republican
- Spouse: Juila
- Children: 1

Louis Henry Winship (1864 – 1940) was an American government official who was deputy state treasurer of Maine from 1917 to 1940. He twice served as Maine State Treasurer - first in 1932 following the resignation of William S. Owen, then again in 1936 following the death of George S. Foster.

== Biography ==
Winship was born in Portland, Maine and graduated from Portland High School. He worked for the Union Mutual Life Insurance Company for several years, then spent 25 years as a voucher auditor for the Maine Central Railroad.

Winship joined the state treasurer's office in 1913 and was promoted to deputy state treasurer in 1917. In December 1931, treasurer William S. Owen was appointed commissioner of finance and governor William Tudor Gardiner appointed Winship to fill the remainder of Owen's term. Winship returned to the position of deputy treasurer when George S. Foster was elected in 1933, but once again became acting treasurer following Foster's death on August 24, 1936. Belmont A. Smith became treasurer in 1937 and Winship continued as deputy under him.

In 1940, state controller William A. Runnells was charged with embezzlement. On April 11, 1940, Governor Lewis O. Barrows demanded that Winship and Maine State Auditor Elbert D. Hayford resign due to "inefficiency and inaccurate reports in handling state finances", which both men immediately did. Less than a month later, Winship suffered a "general breakdown" and was hospitalized. That June, he appeared before the Maine Legislature during Belmont Smith's removal hearings. Winship was taken to Augusta General Hospital following a long hearing and died there on July 20, 1940.
