= Walter Perkins =

Walter Perkins may refer to:

- Walter Perkins (musician) (1932–2004), American jazz drummer
- Walter Perkins (Stroud MP) (1903–1988), Conservative Party politician in England
- Walter E. Perkins (1859–1925), American stage and film actor
- Walter Perkins (New Forest MP), British Member of Parliament for New Forest, 1910–1922
