= 1918 United States Senate election in Maine =

- September 9, 1918
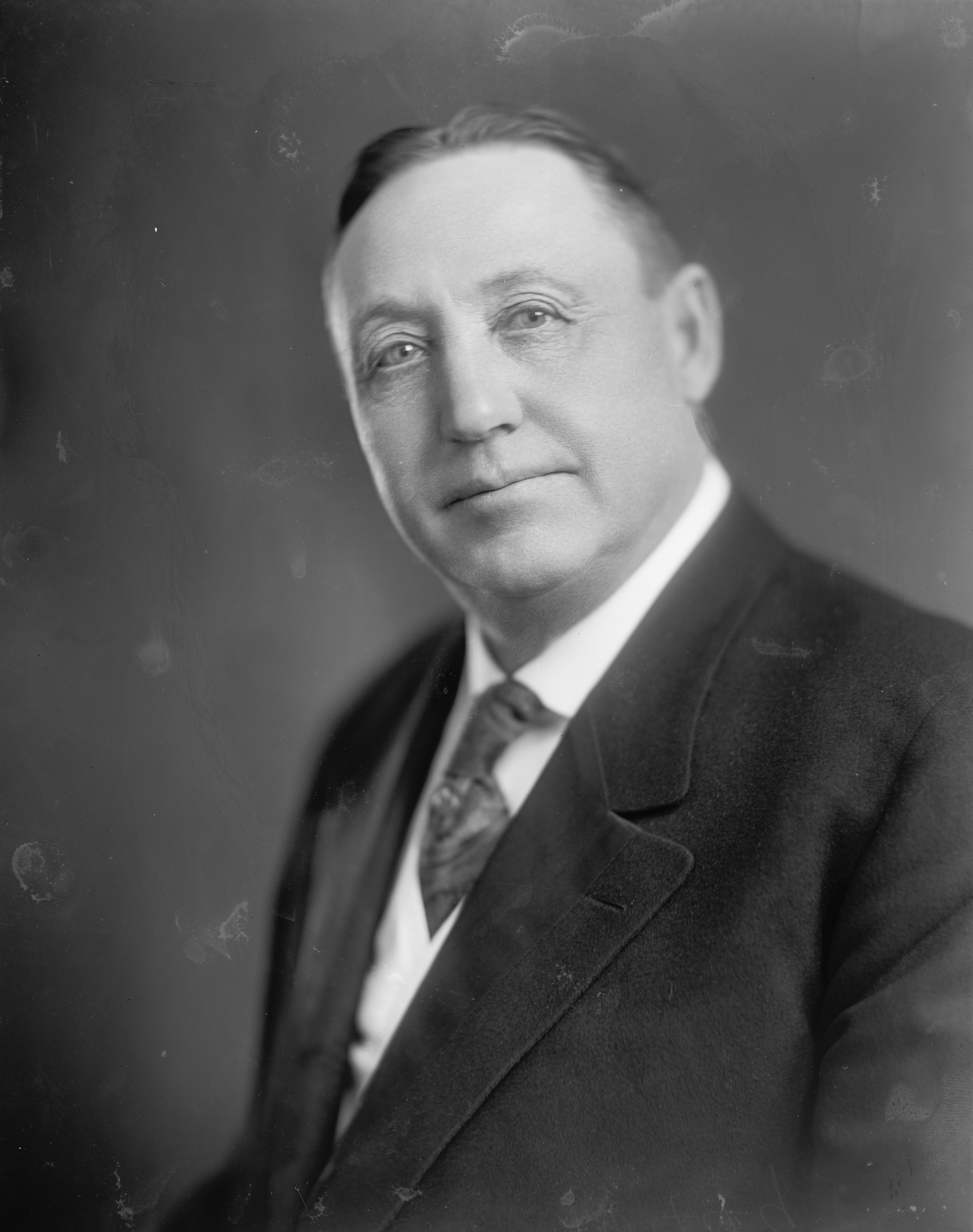

Nominee	Bert Fernald	Elmer E. Newbert
Party	Republican	Democratic
Popular vote	67,431	54,289
Percentage	55.40%	44.60%
- County results Fernald: 50–60% 60–70% Newbert: 50–60%
U.S. senator before election
Bert Fernald
Republican
Elected U.S. Senator
Bert Fernald
Republican

The 1918 United States Senate election in Maine was held on September 9, 1918.

Incumbent Republican U.S. Senator Bert Fernald, who had been elected to fill the unexpired term of the late Senator Edwin C. Burleigh, was elected to a full term in his own right, defeating Democrat Elmer E. Newbert.

== Republican primary ==
=== Candidates ===
- Bert Fernald, incumbent Senator since 1916

=== Results ===
Senator Fernald was unopposed for re-nomination.

1918 Republican U.S. Senate primary
Party	Candidate	Votes	%
Republican	Bert Fernald (inc.)	27,205	100.00%
Total votes		27,205	100.00%

== Democratic primary ==
=== Candidates ===
- Elmer E. Newbert, former mayor of Augusta, Maine (1913–1914) and Maine State Treasurer (1915–1916)

=== Results ===
Newbert was unopposed for the Democratic nomination.

1918 Democratic U.S. Senate primary
Party	Candidate	Votes	%
Democratic	Elmer E. Newbert	11,200	100.00%
Total votes		11,200	100.00%

== General election ==
=== Results ===
1918 U.S. Senate election in Maine
Party	Candidate	Votes	%	±%
Republican	Bert Fernald (inc.)	67,431	55.40%	▲1.13
Democratic	Elmer E. Newbert	54,289	44.60%	▼1.13
Total votes		121,720	100.00%	

== See also ==
- 1918 United States Senate elections
