= Joseph W. Simpson =

American businessman and politician (1868–1946)

Maine State Treasurer
- In office 1917–1921
- Preceded by: Elmer E. Newbert
- Succeeded by: William L. Bonney
- In office 1913–1915
- Preceded by: James F. Singleton
- Succeeded by: Elmer E. Newbert

Personal details
- Born: December 20, 1870 York Harbor, Maine, U.S.
- Died: July 11, 1946 (aged 77) York Harbor, Maine, U.S.
- Resting place: First Parish Cemetery; York, Maine, U.S.
- Party: Republican
- Spouse: Ida Rogers (m. 1899; died 1931)

Joseph Warren Simpson (December 20, 1870 – June 10, 1944) was an American businessman and politician who was Maine State Treasurer from 1913 to 1915 and 1917 to 1921.

== Early life ==
Simpson was born in York Harbor, Maine, on December 20, 1870, to Jeremiah P. and Mary S. (Lowe) Simpson. He was educated at the Kents Hill School. In 1891, Simpson moved to Ohio and worked in the oil industry. He soon returned to Maine and worked as a messenger for the York Harbor & Beach Railroad. In 1899, he married Ida Rogers in Wellington, Nevada.

== Business ==
Simpson was a proprietor of two hotels in York Harbor (Marshall House and Emerson Hotel) and the vice president and treasurer of the Falmouth Hotel in Portland, Maine. In 1921, he led the reorganization of the Maine Hotel Men's Association and served its president. He was also a founder of the Maine Publicity Bureau.

Simpson was the president of Simpson's Market Co., York Harbor Realty Company, and the York County Trust Company and a director of the Forest City Trust Co., Union Mutual Life Insurance Co., and the York Harbor and Beach Railroad.

== Politics ==
Simpson was York's town treasurer in 1896. He was a member of the Maine House of Representatives in 1897 and the Maine Senate from 1903 to 1905.

In 1913, Simpson was elected Maine State Treasurer by the joint convention of the Maine Legislature. He received 96 votes to Democratic incumbent James F. Singleton's 72. In 1915, no party held a majority of seats in the Maine Legislature, and the race for treasurer became deadlocked. This changed when the House voted to accept a majority report of the committee on elections and unseat Republican Levite V. Thibodeau in favor of Fortunat W. Michaud, a Democrat. On the seventh ballot, Democrat Elmer E. Newbert was elected over Simpson by six votes. The Republicans regained control in 1917 and Simpson was elected treasurer again in 1917 and 1919.

In 1920, Simpson was a candidate for the United States House of Representatives seat in Maine's 1st congressional district. He finished fifth in a six-candidate Republican primary behind Carroll L. Beedy, Charles Bailey Clarke, Howard Davies, and Horace Mitchell and ahead of Frank D. Marshall.

In 1925, Simpson was elected Maine's Republican National Committeeman. He defeated Robert J. Peacock 18 votes to 14 to fill the vacancy caused by the death of Harold M. Sewall. He remained on the committee until his resignation in 1934.

== Death ==
Simpson died on June 10, 1944, in York Harbor.
