= Michael A. Napolitano =

American government official (1908–2000)

Maine State Auditor
- In office 1969–1970
- Preceded by: Armand G. Sansoucy
- Succeeded by: William Otterbein
- In office 1957–1965
- Preceded by: Fred M. Berry
- Succeeded by: Armand G. Sansoucy

Maine State Treasurer
- In office 1967–1969
- Preceded by: Eben L. Elwell
- Succeeded by: Norman K. Ferguson

Personal details
- Born: September 2, 1908 Portland, Maine, U.S.
- Died: October 11, 2000 (aged 92) Augusta, Maine, U.S.
- Resting place: St. Mary's Cemetery; Augusta, Maine, U.S.
- Party: Republican
- Spouse: Rose Pelton (m. 1933)
- Children: 2
- Education: Bentley School of Accounting and Finance
- Occupation: Auditor

Michael Anthony Napolitano (September 2, 1908 – October 11, 2000) was an American government official who was Maine State Auditor from 1957 to 1965 and 1969 to 1970 and Maine State Treasurer from 1967 to 1969.

== Early life ==
Napolitano was born in Portland, Maine, on September 2, 1908, to Barbado and Concetta Napolitano. He graduated from Cheverus High School in 1927 and the Bentley School of Accounting and Finance in 1929.

== Career ==
In 1934, Napolitano moved to Augusta, Maine and held various positions in city government. From 1953 to 1954, he was president of the city's board of aldermen.

Napolitano joined the Maine department of audit in 1934. He was a supervising auditor and assistant to the state controller before becoming the state's chief insurance examiner. In 1951, he was named deputy state auditor. In 1952, he was appointed chairman of the state merit award board by governor Frederick G. Payne.

In 1956, state auditor Fred M. Berry announced he would not run for reelection due to illness and Napolitano concurrently announced his intention to succeed him. He was elected unopposed by the Maine Legislature on January 2, 1957.

Napolitano was chairman of the Augusta Republican city committee from 1955 to 1958 and treasurer of the Maine Republican state committee from 1958 to 1967. On May 21, 1964, he was elected chairman of the Republican state committee. He resigned 22 days later due to avoid a conflict of interest in his duties as party chairman and state auditor.

Napolitano was reelected auditor in 1961, but the Democratic Party gained a majority in the 1964 legislative elections and elected one of their own, Armand G. Sansoucy, in 1965.

The Republicans returned to power in 1967 and elected Napolitano Maine State Treasurer. In 1968, he announced he would once again run for state auditor, which paid more (the state auditor received $11,000 more annually) and had more job security (state auditors serve as four-year while state treasurers receive a two-year appointment). He defeated his former deputy auditor, Roscoe M. Parsons, 56–46, to win the Republican nomination and was elected by the Republican majority in January 1969.

Napolitano resigned effective March 16, 1970 to become the first internal auditor of the Bank of Maine. he later held the same position at the Dirigo Bank and Trust Company. He died on October 11, 2000 at his home in Augusta after a brief illness.
