= Rodney L. Scribner =

American government official (1935–2023)

Maine State Auditor
- In office 1987–1997
- Preceded by: Robert W. Norton
- Succeeded by: Gail M. Chase
- In office 1977
- Preceded by: Raymond M. Rideout Jr.
- Succeeded by: George J. Rainville

Maine State Treasurer
- In office 1975–1976
- Preceded by: Norman K. Ferguson
- Succeeded by: Leighton Cooney

Personal details
- Born: May 6, 1935 Rumford, Maine, U.S.
- Died: January 22, 2023 (aged 87) Randolph, Maine, U.S.
- Party: Democratic
- Education: Maine Maritime Academy

Rodney Latham Scribner (May 6, 1935 – January 22, 2023) was an American government official who was Maine State Treasurer from 1975 to 1976 and Maine State Auditor from January to June 1977 and again from 1987 to 1997.

== Early life ==
Scribner was born in Rumford, Maine, on May 6, 1935, to Dwight and Evaline (House) Scribner. He attended public schools in Norway, Maine and graduated Maine Maritime Academy in 1956. He served in the United States Navy, then worked as a Merchant Marine and Certified Public Accountant.

== Career ==
Scribner was the Democratic nominee for the Norway-area seat in the Maine House of Representatives in 1960, but lost to Republican Melville Chapman 1,856 votes to 1,149. He ran again in 1962 and was again beaten by Chapman, 1,236 votes to 920. In 1964, Scribner, now living in Portland, once again ran for the House. In the primary election, it was believed that he had secured one of the city's eleven Democratic nominations by nineteen votes. However, he was displaced from the general election ballot after a recount found that Bartholmew J. Sullivan had actully led Scribner by eight votes.

Following the Democratic Party's victory in the 1964 Maine legislative elections, Scribner announced his candidacy for Maine State Auditor. At the Democratic legislative caucus, Scribner led on the first ballot 45–44–10, but fell behind former Lewiston city auditor Armand G. Sansoucy 49–48–2 on the second ballot. Sansoucy won the nomination on the third ballot, 50 to 49, after the third candidate, Earl Baldwin, withdrew. Scribner instead became the assistant legislative finance officer.

Scribner served treasurer of the Portland Democratic city committee and was treasurer of Kenneth M. Curtis's gubernatorial campaign in the 1966 election. He was a member of the 103rd Legislature (1967–68) and served on the appropriations committee.

Scribner resigned from the House in February 1968 to become deputy commissioner of the state finance department. In March 1969, he was appointed acting Commissioner of Indian Affairs after Edward C. Hinckley resigned due to the agency's financial issues. Scribner returned to finance department that December after Dexter town manager James H. Murphy was chosen as Hinckley's successor. In 1971, Scribner was appointed state controller by commissioner of finance and administration Maurice F. Williams. In 1972, he became state budget officer after Roland M. Berry was fired by Williams. He remained this role until February 23, 1973, when he left the department for personal reasons.

Two months after his resignation, Scribner was hired as a special assistant to the Republican-led legislative appropriations committee.

In 1975, Scribner was the Democratic nominee for Maine State Treasurer. He defeated Republican incumbent Norman Ferguson 110 votes to 69. In 1977, the Scribner was replaced as the Democratic nominee for state treasurer by Leighton Cooney. Cooney was far less qualified for the position and it was reported by the Bangor Daily News that he received the job as compensation for running against popular 2nd congressional district incumbent William Cohen. Scribner was instead nominated for state auditor.

On May 25, 1977, Scribner announced he would be resigning as state auditor effective June 10 to become deputy director of the United States Department of the Treasury's Office of Revenue Sharing. In this role, he managed a 150-person department and helped distribute $6 million a year in revenue sharing funds to 39,000 American city and towns.

Scribner was a member of Governor-elect Joseph E. Brennan's transition team and was chosen to serve as his commissioner of finance and administration. The department was spilt in two in 1986 and Scribner was chosen to serve as commissioner of the new department of finance. He remained in this role until the end of Brennan's time in office and led administration's transition team.

In 1986, Scribner was elected state auditor by the Democratic-majority legislature. His appointment was challenged by House Republican leader Thomas Murphy, who believed there could be a conflict of interest if Scribner had to audit his past work as budget commissioner. Scribner was a vocal-opponent of Elizabeth Noyce's statewide referendum that imposed term-limits on legislators and constitutional officers. He called it "one of the worst laws that was ever enacted" because "there's really no substitute for experience whether you're doing brain surgery or legislation". Voters approved the referendum by 67.5%. He left office when term limits went into effect in 1997.

== Later life ==
Scribner was an amateur radio enthusist. He oversaw ham radio operations for the Maine Emergency Management Agency and helped Governor John Baldacci acquire his amateur radio license. He died on January 22, 2023 at his home in Randolph, Maine.
