= Lamont A. Stevens =

American politician

Lamont A. Stevens was an American politician from Maine. Stevens, a Democrat from Wells, Maine, served in the Maine House of Representatives for one term (1883-1884). He also served a single term as the 2nd Maine State Auditor from 1911 to 1913. He was the Democratic Party's candidate for Maine's 1st congressional district in September 1916, which he lost to Louis B. Goodall of Sanford.

Political offices
Preceded by Charles P. Hatch	Maine State Auditor; 1911–1913	Succeeded by T.F. Callahan
