= Dale McCormick =

American politician (born 1947)

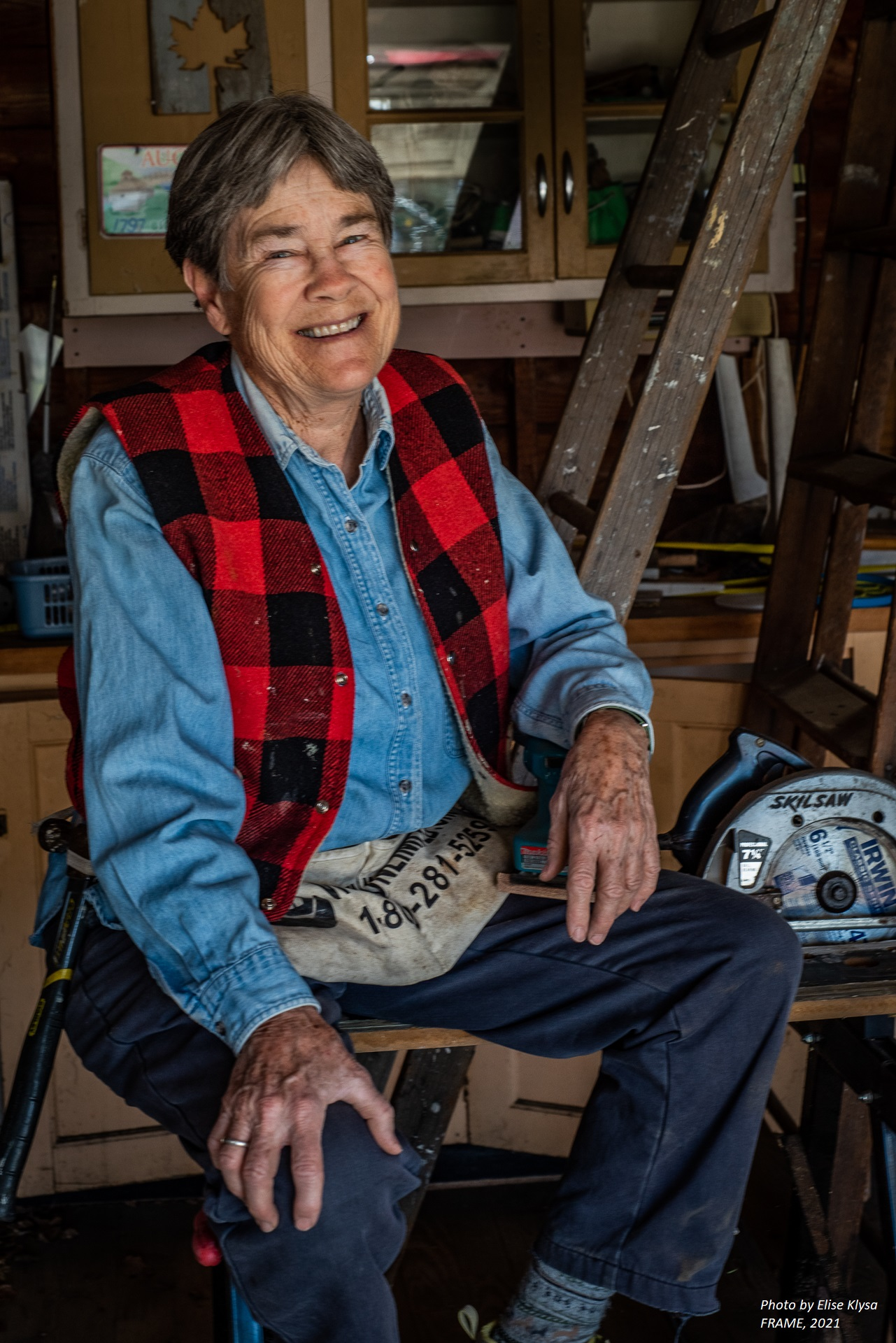
- McCormick in 2021

47th Maine State Treasurer
- In office January 1997 – January 2005
- Governor: Angus King; John Baldacci
- Preceded by: Samuel Shapiro
- Succeeded by: David Lemoine

Member of the Maine Senate from the 18th district
- In office December 1990 – December 1996
- Preceded by: Norman Weymouth
- Succeeded by: Sharon Treat

Personal details
- Born: January 17, 1947 (age 79) New York City, New York, US
- Party: Democratic

Dale McCormick (born January 17, 1947) is an American politician from the state of Maine who currently serves on the city council of Augusta. McCormick was the first openly gay member of the Maine State Legislature, having been elected in 1990 to the first of three terms in the Maine Senate. A Democrat, she represented a largely rural district that included her then-residence in Hallowell. After narrowly losing a congressional bid, she served as state treasurer and as director of the Maine State Housing Authority.

== Early life and education ==
Born in New York City in 1947, McCormick moved to Sigourney, Iowa in 1955 after her parents got divorced. She graduated from Sigourney High School in 1965 before attending the University of Iowa where she graduated in 1970 with a BA and a teaching certificate. After graduation, she stayed in Iowa City, Iowa and apprenticed as a carpenter, becoming the first journeywoman carpenter in the nation in 1975. In 1977, she wrote and illustrated Against the Grain: A Carpentry Manual for Women and set up her own construction and cabinetry company.

McCormick moved to Maine in the early 1980s, where she founded a job training program for women in trade and technical occupations. She actively involved herself in political issues and was elected one of Maine's delegates to the 1984 Democratic National Convention in San Francisco as well as the 1988 convention in Atlanta.

== Political career ==
In 1990, McCormick ran against and defeated incumbent state senator Norman Weymouth, a Republican from West Gardiner. She took office in December 1990 as the representative of the 18th senate district, which consisted of parts of Kennebec County as well as the town of Richmond in Sagadahoc County. She was re-elected in 1992 and 1994.

In 1996, she did not seek re-election to the state senate but instead ran for the U.S. House of Representatives in the 1st district. She lost the Democratic primary to Tom Allen, winning 24,527 votes to his 26,182. Allen went on to win the general election handily and served six terms in Congress.

McCormick was elected state treasurer by the legislature on December 4, 1996, becoming Maine's first female constitutional officer. She was re-elected in 1998, 2000 and 2002. Term limits prevented her from seeking a fifth term in 2004. Gov. John Baldacci subsequently appointed her director of the Maine State Housing Authority.

In 2011, McCormick and her Agency were criticized by MSHA board members appointed by Republican Governor Paul LePage, and ex-officio board member State Treasurer Bruce Poliquin, also a Republican. They accused the MSHA of improper spending of money they felt was inconsistent with the agency's mission, such as donating money to a theater group for ex-convicts, money for massage services for MSHA employees, and money given to groups viewed as left-leaning. McCormick felt the accusations were politically motivated and hurt the ability of the agency to do its job. The Maine Legislature then asked the Office of Program Evaluation and Government Accountability (OPEGA) to conduct an expedited review of MSHA's finances. Before the review was completed, McCormick resigned her position, feeling that the continued criticism was a distraction to the agency's work. She also may have been influenced to resign due to the progress of a proposed bill in the Legislature which would have granted the MSHA Board the ability to hire and fire the agency's director at will, including McCormick. The OPEGA review later found that there was no fraud committed by the agency, though it did question some unnecessary expenditures.

McCormick took out papers in 2013 to seek an at-large seat on the Augusta City Council, which she won in the November 5th election.

== Published works ==
- Against the Grain: A Carpentry Manual for Women ISBN 0-918040-01-9
- Housemending: Home Repair For The Rest of Us

Political offices
Preceded by Samuel Shapiro	Treasurer of Maine; 1997–2005	Succeeded by David Lemoine
