= Newburgh, Maine =

Town in Maine, United States

- Town
- Location within Maine Location within the United States
- Coordinates: 44°43′14″N 68°59′59″W
- Country: United States
- State: Maine
- County: Penobscot

Area
  - Total: 31.03 sq mi (80.37 km^{2})
  - Land: 31.01 sq mi (80.32 km^{2})
  - Water: 0.019 sq mi (0.05 km^{2})
- Elevation: 466 ft (142 m)

Population (2020)
  - Total: 1,595
  - Density: 52/sq mi (19.9/km^{2})
- Time zone: UTC-5 (Eastern (EST))
  - Summer (DST): UTC-4 (EDT)
- ZIP code: 04444
- Area code: 207
- FIPS code: 23-48505
- GNIS feature ID: 582615
- Website: townofnewburghmaine.com

Newburgh is a town in Penobscot County, Maine, United States. The population was 1,595 at the time of the 2020 census.

== Geography ==
According to the United States Census Bureau, the town has a total area of 31.03 square miles (80.37 km^{2}), of which 31.01 square miles (80.32 km^{2}) is land and 0.02 square miles (0.05 km^{2}) is water.

== Demographics ==
Historical population
Census	Pop.	Note	%±
1820	329		—
1830	626		90.3%
1840	963		53.8%
1850	1,399		45.3%
1860	1,365		−2.4%
1870	1,115		−18.3%
1880	1,057		−5.2%
1890	867		−18.0%
1900	734		−15.3%
1910	694		−5.4%
1920	578		−16.7%
1930	551		−4.7%
1940	591		7.3%
1950	599		1.4%
1960	636		6.2%
1970	835		31.3%
1980	1,228		47.1%
1990	1,317		7.2%
2000	1,394		5.8%
2010	1,551		11.3%
2020	1,595		2.8%
U.S. Decennial Census

=== 2010 census ===
As of the census of 2010, there were 1,551 people, 621 households, and 445 families living in the town. The population density was 50.0 inhabitants per square mile (19.3/km^{2}). There were 659 housing units at an average density of 21.3 per square mile (8.2/km^{2}). The racial makeup of the town was 97.9% White, 0.5% African American, 0.5% Native American, 0.2% Asian, 0.5% from other races, and 0.6% from two or more races. Hispanic or Latino of any race were 0.8% of the population.

There were 621 households, of which 31.2% had children under the age of 18 living with them, 60.4% were married couples living together, 7.1% had a female householder with no husband present, 4.2% had a male householder with no wife present, and 28.3% were non-families. 21.1% of all households were made up of individuals, and 8.2% had someone living alone who was 65 years of age or older. The average household size was 2.50 and the average family size was 2.86.

The median age in the town was 41.6 years. 21.1% of residents were under the age of 18; 7.5% were between the ages of 18 and 24; 26.9% were from 25 to 44; 32.1% were from 45 to 64; and 12.4% were 65 years of age or older. The gender makeup of the town was 50.5% male and 49.5% female.

=== 2000 census ===
As of the census of 2000, there were 1,394 people, 557 households, and 398 families living in the town. The population density was 45.1 inhabitants per square mile (17.4/km^{2}). There were 602 housing units at an average density of 19.5 per square mile (7.5/km^{2}). The racial makeup of the town was 98.13% White, 0.29% African American, 0.07% Native American, 0.14% Asian, 0.22% from other races, and 1.15% from two or more races. Hispanic or Latino of any race were 0.43% of the population.

There were 557 households, out of which 29.3% had children under the age of 18 living with them, 60.5% were married couples living together, 7.5% had a female householder with no husband present, and 28.5% were non-families. 20.6% of all households were made up of individuals, and 8.6% had someone living alone who was 65 years of age or older. The average household size was 2.50 and the average family size was 2.88.

In the town, the population was spread out, with 22.5% under the age of 18, 7.5% from 18 to 24, 31.9% from 25 to 44, 27.3% from 45 to 64, and 11.0% who were 65 years of age or older. The median age was 39 years. For every 100 females, there were 98.3 males. For every 100 females age 18 and over, there were 93.7 males.

The median income for a household in the town was $39,850, and the median income for a family was $44,167. Males had a median income of $31,964 versus $23,672 for females. The per capita income for the town was $19,000. About 1.8% of families and 5.9% of the population were below the poverty line, including 3.3% of those under age 18 and 15.4% of those age 65 or over.

== Notable people ==
- Ricky Craven, former NASCAR driver
- Orrin Larrabee Miller, US congressman from Kansas
- Belmont A. Smith, Maine State Treasurer
