= Neria Douglass =

American politician & attorney (born 1952)

50th Treasurer of Maine
- In office January 7, 2013 – January 6, 2015
- Preceded by: Bruce Poliquin
- Succeeded by: Terry Hayes

19th State Auditor of Maine
- In office January 7, 2005 – December 2012
- Governor: John Baldacci; Paul LePage
- Preceded by: Gail M. Chase
- Succeeded by: Pola Buckley

Member of the Maine Senate from the 22nd district
- In office 1998–2004
- Preceded by: John J. Cleveland
- Succeeded by: Christine Savage

Personal details
- Born: November 16, 1952 (age 73) Boston, Massachusetts, U.S.
- Party: Democratic
- Spouse: Paul Douglass
- Education: Wellesley College (BA); Vanderbilt University (JD)

Neria R. Douglass (born 1952) is an American attorney and politician who served as State Treasurer of Maine. Priorly, she served as State Auditor and also represented Auburn in the Maine Senate. She is a member of the Democratic Party.

== Career ==
Douglass was the chair of the Auburn School Committee from 1989 to 1994, and she served on the Auburn City Council from 1994 to 1998.

Douglass began her term as State Treasurer on January 7, 2013. Douglass stated after being sworn in that she hopes to persuade Governor Paul LePage to authorize the sale of voter-approved bonds, something which LePage has said he won't do until the State's financial picture improves.

Maine Democrats nominated Douglass to serve a second term, but the Legislature selected the nominee suggested by Republicans, Teresea Hayes, a former Democrat.

Political offices
Preceded by Gail M. Chase	Maine State Auditor; 2005–2012	Succeeded by Pola Buckley
Preceded by Bruce Poliquin	Treasurer of Maine; 2013–2015	Succeeded by Terry Hayes
