= James White (Maine politician) =

American politician

Maine State Treasurer
- In office 1842–1847
- Governor: John Fairfield; Edward Kavanagh; David Dunn; John W. Dana; Hugh J. Anderson
- Preceded by: Sanford Kingsbury
- Succeeded by: Moses Macdonald

Personal details
- Born: September 2, 1792 Chester, New Hampshire
- Died: December 24, 1870 (aged 78) Belfast, Maine
- Party: Democratic

James White (September 2, 1792 – December 24, 1870) was an American attorney and Democratic politician in the U.S. state of Maine. He served as Maine State Treasurer from 1842 to 1847.

== Early life and career ==
White was born in Chester, New Hampshire to Col. William White and Elizabeth Mitchell. In 1818 he graduated from Dartmouth College and moved to Belfast, Maine to study law.

== Political career ==
White served as Maine State Treasurer from 1842 to 1847 and ran for Congress in 1862 and 1864.

Political offices
Preceded by Sanford Kingsbury	Treasurer of Maine; 1842–1847	Succeeded by Moses Macdonald
