= Timothy F. Callahan =

American businessman and politician (1856–1934)

Maine State Auditor
- In office 1913–1915
- Preceded by: Lamont A. Stevens
- Succeeded by: J. Edward Sullivan

Personal details
- Born: March 1, 1856 Lewiston, Maine, U.S.
- Died: October 10, 1951 (aged 72) Lewiston, Maine, U.S.
- Resting place: Mount Hope Cemetery; Lewiston, Maine, U.S.
- Party: Republican
- Spouse: Mary E. McVay (m. 1885; died 1948)
- Children: 3

Timothy F. Callahan (March 1, 1856 – October 22, 1934) was an American politician and businessperson from who served one term in the Maine House of Representatives (1891–1892) and was Maine State Auditor from 1913 to 1915.

== Early life ==
Callahan was born in Lewiston, Maine, on March, 1, 1856, to John and Margaret (Murphy) Callahan. Both of his parents were Irish immigrants. On October 21, 1885, Callahan married Mary E. McVay in Lewiston. They had three children.

== Business ==
He and his brother Eugene Callahan were merchants. The brothers erected two Renaissance-style commercial buildings in downtown Lewiston; the first in 1892 and the second in 1910–11. They sold trunks, hats and men's clothing. Starting in 1920, Callahan also worked in real estate and insurance.

Callahan was a director of the Central Maine General Hospital and a trustee of the People's Saving's Bank. From 1907 to 1921, he was the treasurer of the Maine State Fair.

== Government ==
Callahan was a member of the Lewiston city council from 1883 to 1886. From 1885 to 1891, he was a member of the city's water commission. In 1891, he was a member of the Maine House of Representatives. From 1894 to 1904, he was the city treasurer of Lewiston.

In 1912, Callahan was the Republican nominee for Maine State Auditor and defeated Democratic incumbent Lamont A. Stevens. He was defeated for reelection in 1914 by Democrat J. Edward Sullivan in a contest that saw a strong performance from Progressive Party nominee Merton T. Goodrich.

Callahan was a candidate for the Republican nomination in the 1916 Maine gubernatorial election, but lost to Carl Milliken.

From 1919 to 1924, Callahan was a trustee of the Lewiston Public Library.

== Death ==
On October 22, 1934, Callahan was found dead at the home of C. J. Callahan, a relative and neighbor. Callahan had taken a seat on the porch, but had not rung the doorbell. Although he had dealt with health issues in the past, he did not mention feeling ill before leaving his home that day and his death was unexpected.

Political offices
Preceded by Lamont A. Stevens	Maine State Auditor; 1913–1915	Succeeded by J. Edward Sullivan
