= David Hammons (Maine politician) =

American politician

Member of the U.S. House of Representatives from Maine's 1st district
- In office March 4, 1847 – March 3, 1849
- Preceded by: John Fairfield Scamman
- Succeeded by: Elbridge Gerry

Member of the Maine Senate from the 11th district
- In office January 3, 1840 – January 5, 1842 Serving with Alvan Bolster
- Preceded by: Job Prince
- Succeeded by: Virgil D. Parris
- Constituency: Oxford County

Personal details
- Born: May 12, 1808 Cornish, District of Maine, Massachusetts, U.S.
- Died: November 7, 1888 (aged 80) Bethel, Maine, U.S.
- Party: Democratic
- Occupation: Lawyer; politician

David Hammons (May 12, 1808 – November 7, 1888) was a United States representative from Maine.

He was born in Cornish, Massachusetts (now in Maine) on May 12, 1808. He attended the common schools and Limerick Academy in Limerick, Maine. He studied law with David Gould in Alfred, Maine, was admitted to the bar and commenced practice in Lovell.

He was elected a member of the Maine State Senate (1840–1841).

In 1846 Hammons was elected to the U.S. House as a Democrat, and served in the Thirtieth Congress (March 4, 1847 – March 3, 1849).

After leaving Congress Hammons continued the practice of law. Though he had been willing to support the expansion of slavery in order to prevent southern states from seceding, he supported the Union during the American Civil War, and worked for no fee to aid Union Army veterans who filed claims for disability pensions.

Hammons died in Bethel on November 7, 1888. His interment was in Woodland Cemetery.

U.S. House of Representatives
Preceded by John Fairfield Scamman	Member of the U.S. House of Representatives from Maine's 1st congressional district March 4, 1847–March 3, 1849	Succeeded by Elbridge Gerry
