= John F. Scamman =

American politician

Member of the U.S. House of Representatives from Maine's 1st district
- In office March 4, 1845 – March 3, 1847
- Preceded by: Joshua Herrick
- Succeeded by: David Hammons

Member of the Massachusetts House of Representatives
- In office 1817

Member of the Maine House of Representatives
- In office 1820; 1821

Personal details
- Born: John Fairfield Scamman; October 24, 1786 Wells, Massachusetts (now Maine)
- Died: May 22, 1858 (aged 71) Saco, Maine
- Party: Democratic

John Fairfield Scamman (or Scammon) (October 24, 1786 – May 22, 1858) was a United States representative from Maine. He was born in Wells, Massachusetts (now in Maine) on October 24, 1786. He attended the common schools, then engaged in mercantile pursuits.

== Biography ==
He was elected a member of the Massachusetts House of Representatives in 1817, elected a member of the Maine House of Representatives in 1820 and 1821. He was appointed collector of customs in Saco from 1829 to 1841. He was elected as a Democrat to the Twenty-ninth Congress (March 4, 1845 – March 3, 1847). He was Chairman of Committee on Expenditures in the US Department of the Treasury (Twenty-ninth Congress).

Scamman served in the Maine State Senate in 1855 and died in Saco on May 22, 1858. He was interred at Laurel Hill Cemetery.

U.S. House of Representatives
Preceded by Joshua Herrick	Member of the U.S. House of Representatives from Maine's 1st congressional district March 4, 1845–March 3, 1847	Succeeded by David Hammons
