= Silas C. Hatch =

American politician

Silas Clinton Hatch (March 28, 1821, Bangor, Maine – July 27, 1890) was an American businessman and politician. He served as Maine State Treasurer from 1874 until 1876.

== Life ==
Hatch was born in Bangor, Maine, the son of Silas Hatch and Mary Curry. He attended the school in Bangor and then studied at the Gorham Seminary.

He opened a trade store in Bangor in 1845 and ran it until 1870. Hatch served the city government for fourteen years, serving on the Common Council and the Board of Aldermen for seven years apiece. For eight years he was a city councilor and he belonged to the executive council in the years 1871, 1872 and 1878. In the presidential election of 1856, he worked for the campaign of Millard Fillmore. He served in the Maine House of Representatives from 1873 to 1874 and from 1881 to 1882, chairing the Financial Affairs and Ways and Means committees in 1881.

Hatch died on July 27, 1890, in Bangor. His grave is located at the Mount Hope Cemetery in Bangor.

== Archives and records ==
- Silas Clinton Hatch records at Baker Library Special Collections, Harvard Business School.

Political offices
Preceded by William Caldwell	Treasurer of Maine; 1874-1876	Succeeded by Esreff H. Banks
