= Maine State Auditor =

- Incumbent; Matthew Dunlap since November 14, 2022
- First holder: Charles P. Hatch
- Website: www.maine.gov/audit/

The Maine state auditor is a statutory state executive position in the government of the U.S. state of Maine. According to the Office of the State Auditor's webpage, the primary purpose of the position is "to audit the financial statements of the State of Maine and expenditures of federal programs".

The Office of State Auditor was created in 1883 to examine the accounts held by the Maine State Treasurer. Originally a three-member committee, the single state auditor position was created in 1907. State Auditors are elected by the Maine Legislature for a term of four years and each Auditor is limited to two four-year terms.

== Qualifications ==
According to statute, the state auditor "..shall be a certified public accountant or a college graduate with not less than 6 years of experience as a professional accountant or auditor, including not less than 5 years of auditing experience, of which not less than 4 years shall have been in a supervisory capacity".

== List of Maine state auditors ==
Name	Took office	Left office	Party
Charles P. Hatch	1907	1911	Republican
Lamont A. Stevens	1911	1913	Democratic
T.F. Callahan	1913	1915	Republican
J. Edward Sullivan	1915	1917	Democratic
Roy L. Wardwell	1917	1922	Republican
Elbert D. Hayford	1922	1940	Republican
William D. Hayes	1940	1945	Republican
Fred M. Berry	1945	1957	Republican
Michael A. Napolitano	1957	1965	Republican
Armand G. Sansoucy	1965	1969	Democratic
Michael A. Napolitano	1969	1970	Republican
William Otterbein	1970	1972	Republican
Raymond M. Rideout Jr.	1972	1976	Republican
Rodney L. Scribner	1976	June 10, 1977	Democratic
George J. Rainville	June 30, 1977	1985	Democratic
Robert W. Norton	1985	March 27, 1987	Democratic
Rodney L. Scribner	1987	1997	Democratic
Gail M. Chase	1997	2005	Democratic
Neria Douglass	2005	2012	Democratic
Pola Buckley	2013	2020	Democratic
Matthew Dunlap	January 2021	October 2021	Democratic
Jacob Norton	October 2021	November 2022	
Matthew Dunlap	2022	Present	Democratic
