= Ted Sullivan =

Ted Sullivan may refer to:

- Ted Sullivan (baseball) (1851–1929), Timothy Paul "Ted" Sullivan, Major League Baseball manager
- Ted Sullivan (filmmaker) (born 1971), Edward Sullivan, screenwriter and director
- Ted Sullivan (Coronation Street), fictional character on the British soap opera Coronation Street

== See also ==
- Edward Sullivan (disambiguation)
