= William D. Hayes =

American public accountant (1884–1973)

Maine State Auditor
- In office 1940–1945
- Preceded by: Elbert D. Hayford
- Succeeded by: Fred M. Berry

Personal details
- Born: July 11, 1884 Bellows Falls, Vermont, U.S.
- Died: February 4, 1973 (aged 88) Framingham, Massachusetts, U.S.
- Resting place: Oak Hill Cemetery; Bellows Falls, Vermont
- Party: Republican
- Spouse: Emilie A. Walter (m. 1907)
- Children: 3
- Education: Biltmore Forest School
- Occupation: Public accountant

William Danforth Hayes (July 11, 1884 – February 4, 1973) was an American public accountant who was Maine State Auditor from 1940 to 1945.

== Early life ==
Hayes was born in Bellows Falls, Vermont, on July 11, 1884, to Lyman Simpson and Mary (Danforth) Hayes. He graduated from Bellows Falls High School and the Biltmore Forest School. On September 19, 1907, he married Emilie A. Walter, in Santa Fe, New Mexico. They had three children.

== Career ==
Hayes worked for the United States Forest Service from 1904 to 1913. He then worked as a treasurer for various lumber companies. In 1917, he moved to Bangor, Maine to become treasurer of E. B. Draper's lumber and pulpwood businesses.

In 1924, Hayes opened a public accounting office in Bangor. He received his Certified Public Accountant certificate in 1933.

On April 18, 1940, Hayes was appointed Maine State Auditor by Maine Senate President Sumner Sewall. He succeeded Elbert D. Hayford, who resigned after state controller William A. Runnells was charged with embezzlement. Hayes's appointment lasted until the end of the 1940–41 legislative session. He sought a full term in 1941 and defeated C. Vaughn Chapman 131 votes to 19 to win the Republican nomination. He was then elected to a four-year term by the Maine State Legislature. He sought a second term in 1945, but lost the Republican nomination to Fred M. Berry 101 votes to 60 (a third candidate, C. Vaughn Chapman, received four votes).

In 1951, Hayes was appointed to the Maine board of accountancy by governor Frederick G. Payne. He was reappointed in 1955 by Democrat Edmund Muskie.

== Later life and death ==
Hayes continued to work as an accountant in Bangor until his retirement in 1965. In 1972, he moved to Framingham, Massachusetts. On February 4, 1973, Hayes died at Framingham Union Hospital after a brief illness.
