= Joshua Herrick =

American politician

Member of U.S. House of Representatives from Maine's 1st district
- In office March 4, 1843 – March 3, 1845
- Preceded by: Nathan Clifford
- Succeeded by: John F. Scamman

County Commissioner of York County, Maine
- In office 1842–1843

Register of Probate of York County, Maine
- In office 1849–1855

Selectman, Assessor, and Overseer of the Poor Kennebunkport, Maine
- In office 1839–1842

Town Clerk of Kennebunkport, Maine
- In office 1832–1842

Personal details
- Born: March 18, 1793 Beverly, Massachusetts
- Died: August 30, 1874 (aged 81) Alfred, Maine
- Resting place: Village Cemetery, Kennebunkport, Maine

Joshua Herrick (March 18, 1793 – August 30, 1874) was an American politician and a United States representative from Maine.

== Biography ==
Herrick was born in Beverly, Massachusetts, where he attended the common schools. He moved to the district of Maine in 1811 and engaged in the lumber business. He served in the War of 1812. Herrick moved to Brunswick, Maine, and became connected with the first cotton factory of Maine.

== Career ==
Herrick was a deputy sheriff of Cumberland County, Maine for many years as well as a deputy collector and inspector of customs at Kennebunkport, Maine, from 1829 to 1841. He served as Town Clerk of Kennebunkport from 1832 to 1842.

Herrick also served as a Selectman, Assessor, and Overseer of the Poor of Kennebunkport from 1839 to 1842. He was county commissioner of York County, Maine in 1842 and 1843.

Herrick was elected as a Democrat to the Twenty-eighth Congress (March 4, 1843 – March 3, 1845), but was an unsuccessful candidate for renomination in 1844 to the Twenty-ninth Congress. After leaving Congress, he served as the deputy collector at Kennebunkport from 1847 to 1849. He served as Register of Probate of York County from 1849 to 1855.

== Death ==
Herrick died in Alfred, Maine in 1874, and was buried in Village Cemetery, Kennebunkport, Maine.

U.S. House of Representatives
Preceded by Nathan Clifford	Member of the U.S. House of Representatives from Maine's 1st congressional district March 4, 1843–March 3, 1845	Succeeded by John Fairfield Scammon
