= Elbridge Gerry (Maine politician) =

American politician

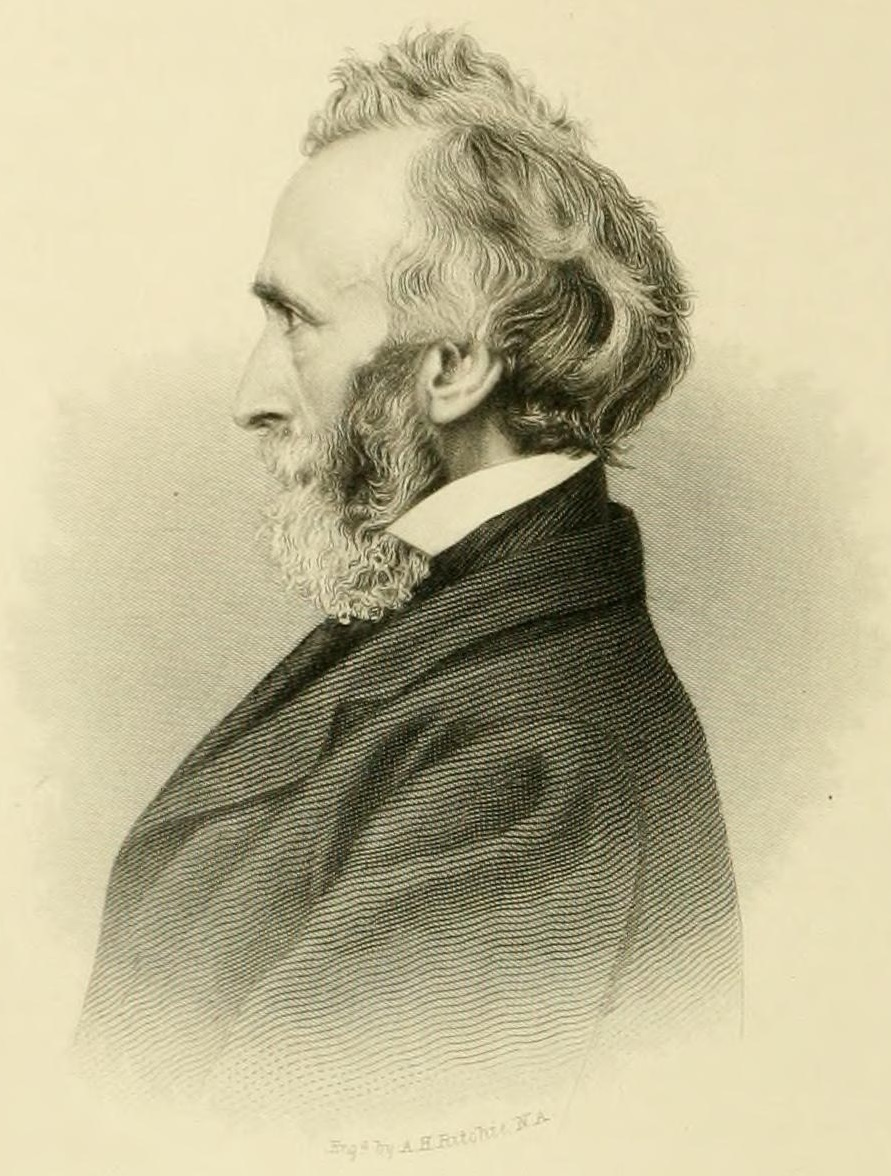
- From 1880's History of Cumberland Co., Maine.

Member of U.S. House of Representatives from Maine's 1st district
- In office March 4, 1849 – March 3, 1851
- Preceded by: David Hammons
- Succeeded by: Moses Macdonald

Member of the Maine House of Representatives
- In office 1846–1847
- Preceded by: Josiah Monroe
- Succeeded by: John Hill

Prosecuting Attorney for Oxford County
- In office 1842–1845

Clerk of the Maine House of Representatives
- In office 1840–1841
- Preceded by: George Robinson
- Succeeded by: George C. Getchell

Personal details
- Born: December 16, 1813 Waterford, Massachusetts (now Maine)
- Died: April 10, 1886 (aged 72) Portland, Maine
- Resting place: Evergreen Cemetery, Portland, Maine
- Party: Democratic
- Spouse: Anna St. Clair Jenness (m. 1849)
- Children: 3
- Profession: Attorney

Elbridge Gerry (December 6, 1813 – April 10, 1886) was an American lawyer, who served as a U.S. Congressman from Maine from 1849 to 1851.

== Biography ==
Gerry was born on December 6, 1813, in Waterford, Massachusetts (now in Maine); he was the son of Peter and Mary "Polly" (Cutler) Gerry. He attended Bridgton Academy, and studied law with Judge Stephen Emery (who also served as Maine's Attorney General). Gerry was admitted to the bar in 1839 and established a practice in Waterford.

Gerry's father served in the Maine House of Representatives and in local offices including selectman and town meeting moderator. Gerry also served in local offices in Waterford, including town clerk (1842-1843), and town meeting moderator (1847, 1852).

He was clerk of the Maine House of Representatives in 1840, and was appointed a United States commissioner in bankruptcy in 1841. From 1842 to 1845 he was prosecuting attorney for Oxford County. In 1846 he served in the Maine House of Representatives, including holding the post of Speaker Pro tempore during the absence of Speaker Ebenezer Knowlton.

He was elected to a single term in Congress as a Democrat in 1848, and served from March 4, 1849, to March 3, 1851. He did not run for reelection in 1850, and moved to Portland to continue the practice of law.

He died in Portland on April 10, 1886, and was buried at Portland's Evergreen Cemetery.

== Family ==
In 1849, Gerry married Anna St. Clair Jenness, the daughter of Richard and Caroline Jenness of Portsmouth, New Hampshire. They were the parents of three children: Alice, Elbridge, and Elizabeth.

Alice Gerry (1850-1921) was the wife of Arthur Melville Patterson of Baltimore, Maryland. After his death, she married John Stewart, the grandson of David Stewart. After her 1913 divorce, she married Francis B. Griswold.

Elbridge Gerry (1853-1907) graduated from Bowdoin College and Harvard Law School. He practiced law in Maine and New York City before accepting appointment as vice consul in Le Havre, France, in 1885. He remained in Europe after resigning in 1887, and died in Siena, Italy.

Elizabeth Jenness Gerry (1852-1912), was the wife of Greek diplomat Constantin Pangiris.

== Note ==
Many sources indicate that Elbridge Gerry (1813-1886) was the grandson of Elbridge Gerry (1744-1814). This seems to be in error; the ancestry of Elbridge Gerry (1813-1886) can be traced to his father Peter (1776-1847); Peter's father Nathaniel Gerry (or Geary) (1733-1791); Nathaniel's father Thomas; Nathaniel's grandfather, also named Thomas; and Nathaniel's great-grandfather Thomas Gery (or Gary).

== Sources ==
=== Books ===
- Biographical Review: Oxford and Franklin Counties, Maine. Boston, MA: Biographical Review Publishing Company. 1897. p. 20. ISBN 9781934710173.
- Bowdoin College (1911). Obituary Record of the Graduates of Bowdoin College and the Medical School of Maine. Brunswick, ME: Bowdoin College Library. p. 408.
- Clayton, W. W. (1880). History of Cumberland Co., Maine. Philadelphia, PA: Everts & Peck. pp. 99–100.
- Cutter, William Richard. Historic Homes and Places and Genealogical and Personal Memoirs Relating to the Families of Middlesex County, Massachusetts. Vol. II. New York, NY: Lewis Historical Publishing Company. pp. 666–667.
- Hoyt, Edmund S. (1876). Maine State Year-book, and Legislative Manual for the Year 1876-67. Portland, ME: Hoyt, Fogg & Donham. p. 85.
- Leach, Josiah Granville (1910). Some Account of Capt. John Frazier and His Descendants. Philadelphia, PA: J. B. Lippincott Company. p. 96.
- United States House of Representatives (2005). Biographical Directory of the United States Congress, 1774-2005. Washington, DC: U.S. Government Printing Office. p. 1112. ISBN 978-0-16-073176-1.
- Warren, Henry Pelt (1879). The History of Waterford, Oxford County, Maine. Boston, MA: Hoyt, Fogg & Donham. pp. 208–212.

=== Newspapers ===
- "Death of Elbridge Gerry". Minneapolis Star-Tribune. Minneapolis, MN. April 11, 1886. p. 7.
- "Mme. Pangiris Dies in Switzerland" (PDF). New York Times. New York, NY. July 1, 1912.
- "Wedding Tragedy". The Advertiser. Adelaide, Australia. August 11, 1914. p. 10.

U.S. House of Representatives
Preceded by David Hammons	Member of the U.S. House of Representatives from Maine's 1st congressional district March 4, 1849 – March 3, 1851	Succeeded by Moses Macdonald
