= Elmer E. Newbert =

American politician (1861–1939)

Maine State Treasurer
- In office 1915–1916
- Preceded by: Joseph W. Simpson
- Succeeded by: Joseph W. Simpson

Mayor of Augusta, Maine
- In office 1913–1915
- Preceded by: Reuel J. Noyes
- Succeeded by: Blaine S. Viles

Personal details
- Born: November 15, 1861 Waldoboro, Maine, U.S.
- Died: March 20, 1939 (aged 77) Augusta, Maine, U.S.
- Party: Democratic
- Education: Bangor Theological Seminary

Elmer Ellsworth Newbert (November 15, 1861 – March 20, 1939) was an American Unitarian minister and politician who was the mayor of Augusta, Maine from 1913 to 1915 and Maine State Treasurer from 1915 to 1916. He was the Democratic nominee in the 1918 United States Senate election in Maine, but was defeated by Republican incumbent Bert M. Fernald.

== Early life and ministry ==
Newbert was born in Waldoboro, Maine on November 15, 1861 and was educated in the Waldoboro and Union, Maine public schools. He graduated from the Bangor Theological Seminary in 1890 and took special courses at Bowdoin College and Harvard College. He was ordanined by the Unitarian Church on October 25, 1892. He was the pastor of the All Souls Church in Augusta for eleven years. In 1903, he was sent by the American Unitarian Association to establish a church in Indianapolis. He chose the name All Souls' Unitarian Church and held the first service on May 3, 1903. He retired from the ministry in 1906 and returned to Augusta, where he became involved in business and politics. In 1915, he entered the real estate business.

== Politics ==
Newbert was a member of the Augusta school board and city council. In 1907, he became Augusta's city clerk. He was a member of the Maine House of Representatives during the 73rd Legislature (1907) and was elected to fill a vacancy in the special session of 75th Legislature (1912). He was elected again in 1912 and was an unsuccessful candidate for speaker of the House that session. He served as the Democratic floor leader in 1913.

In 1913, Newbert defeated Republican Willis E. Swift by 49 votes to become mayor of Augusta. The two faced off again in 1914, and Newbert was once again victorious, beating Swift 1,437 votes to 1,316. Newbert was a candidate in the 1914 Maine gubernatorial election, finishing second in the Democratic primary to Oakley C. Curtis.

In 1915, Newbert was the Democratic nominee for state treasurer. As no party held a majority of seats in the Maine Legislature, the race became deadlocked. This changed when the House voted to accept a majority report of the committee on elections and unseat Republican Levite V. Thibodeau in favor of Fortunat W. Michaud, a Democrat. On the seventh ballot, Newbert was elected over Republican incumbent Joseph W. Simpson by six votes. In 1916, he traveled to Nebraska to speak against Prohibition, stating that the Maine law had failed. The Republican Party retook the legislature in 1916 and returned Simpson to office.

In 1918, Newbert was the Democratic nominee for the United States Senate seat held by Republican Bert M. Fernald, who won a special election in 1916 to fill the unexpired term of Edwin C. Burleigh. The Democrats centered their campaign on the actions of Republican Governor Carl Milliken and the argument that voters should support the wartime efforts of President Woodrow Wilson. Republicans swept the elections, reelecting Fernald and Milliken and winning all four of the state's seats in the United States House of Representatives.

Newbert continued to be involved in politics after his failed Senate run. He was an active member of the Democratic Party and opposed the Nineteenth Amendment to the United States Constitution, which granted women's suffrage in the United States.

== Later life ==
In 1924, he became president of the Augusta Water District. He also served as a director of the First National Bank and continued to be involved in real estate. He died from a heart attack on March 20, 1939.
