= Moses Macdonald =

American politician

Member of U.S. House of Representatives from Maine's 1st district
- In office March 4, 1851 – March 3, 1855
- Preceded by: Elbridge Gerry
- Succeeded by: John M. Wood

Maine State Treasurer
- In office 1847–1850

Member of the Maine State Senate
- In office 1847–1848

Speaker of the Maine House of Representatives
- In office 1845–1846

Member of the Maine House of Representatives
- In office 1841–1843

Personal details
- Born: April 8, 1815 Limerick, Massachusetts (now Maine)
- Died: October 18, 1869 (aged 54) Saco, Maine
- Resting place: Laurel Hill Cemetery, Saco, Maine
- Party: Democratic

Moses Macdonald (April 8, 1815 – October 18, 1869) was an American attorney and Democratic politician in the U.S. state of Maine. He served as a member of the United States House of Representatives, the Maine State Senate and as Speaker of the Maine House of Representatives during the 1800s.

== Early life and career ==
Macdonald was born in Limerick, Massachusetts (now in Maine) and was the son of major General John Macdonald and Lydia Wiley Macdonald. He received an academic education and attended Phillips Academy. He studied law, was admitted to the bar in 1837 and began the practice of law in Biddeford, Maine in 1837.

== Political career ==
He served as a member of the Maine House of Representatives in 1841, 1842, and 1845. He was the Speaker of the Maine House of Representatives in 1845 and served in the Maine Senate in 1847. He was the Maine State Treasurer from 1847 to 1850.

Macdonald was elected as a Democratic candidate to the Thirty-second and Thirty-third Congresses, serving from March 4, 1851 – March 3, 1855. He was chairman of the Committee on Revolutionary Claims during the Thirty-second Congress.

After leaving Congress, he was appointed collector of customs at Portland, Maine by President James Buchanan in 1857 and served until 1861. He died in Saco, Maine in 1869 at the age of 54 and was buried in Laurel Hill Cemetery there.

Political offices
Preceded by David Dunn	17th Speaker of the Maine House of Representatives; 1845-1846	Succeeded by Ebenezer Knowlton
Preceded by James White	Treasurer of Maine; 1847–1849	Succeeded by Samuel Cony
U.S. House of Representatives
Preceded by Elbridge Gerry	Member of the U.S. House of Representatives from Maine's 1st congressional district March 4, 1851 – March 3, 1855	Succeeded by John M. Wood
