= William L. Bonney =

American politician (1874–1936)

Maine State Treasurer
- In office 1921–1926
- Preceded by: Joseph W. Simpson
- Succeeded by: William S. Owen

Speaker of the Maine House of Representatives
- In office 1917–1918
- Preceded by: Herbert W. Trafton
- Succeeded by: Frank G. Farrington

Personal details
- Born: March 3, 1866 Turner, Maine, U.S.
- Died: May 27, 1937 (aged 71) Hebron, Maine, U.S.
- Party: Republican
- Education: Colby College

William L.^{1} Bonney (March 3, 1866 – May 27, 1937) was an American politician who was speaker of the Maine House of Representatives from 1917 to 1918 and Maine State Treasurer from 1921 to 1926. He was the first person from Sagadahoc County, Maine to hold either office.

== Early life ==
Bonney was born in Turner, Maine, on March 3, 1866 to Tristam and Maria (Whitman) Bonney. He was a cousin of Percival Bonney. He was educated at the Hebron Academy and graduated from Colby College in 1892. He played first base for the Colby baseball team.

Bonney was principal of the Patten Academy from 1894 to 1897, Fort Fairfield High School from 1897 to 1900, and Skowhegan Area High School from 1900 to 1902. He served as the Maine representative for the American Book Company from 1902 until his death. In 1912, Bonney was elected to the Hebron Academy's board of trustees.

On June 11, 1897, Bonney marred Mary A. Shaw in Turner. Shaw had been orphaned as a child and resided with Bonney's uncle after her parents' deaths. In 1906, Bonney moved to Bowdoinham, Maine, where he maintained one of the state's best apple orchards.

== Politics ==
Bonney was elected to the Maine House of Representatives in 1914. He was the only Republican elected in Sagadahoc County as well as the only Republican representative from the third council district. As such, he had sole discresion in selecting the Republican nominee for Executive Councilor from the district. During his freshman term, Bonney was a member of the insurance committee. In 1916, Bonney was reelected and the Republicans took control of the House. He ran for speaker and defeated Percival P. Baxter 65 votes to 28 to win the nomination of the Republican caucus. He did not run for reelection in 1918 and was succeeded as speaker by Frank G. Farrington, whom Bonney had previously succeeded as principal of Skowhegan Area High School.

In 1921, Bonney was elected Maine State Treasurer without opposition. He was reelected in 1923 and 1925, but term limits kept him from running in 1927.

== Later life and death ==
Bonney spent the final ten years of his life residing in Gardiner, Maine. On May 26, 1937, Bonney, who had been in ill health for three to four months, traveled to Hebron, Maine to attend a Hebron Academy trustees meeting. The following morning, he suddenly collapsed and died at the home of the school's principal, Ralph H. Hunt.

== Notes ==
1. Some sources give his middle name as Lavell, while others give it as Lowell.
