= Leighton Cooney =

American politician

Leighton H. Cooney Jr. was a Maine politician and retired schoolteacher. Cooney, a Democrat, served three terms in the Maine House of Representatives. In 1976. Cooney ran against incumbent William Cohen in Maine's 2nd Congressional District and received 19.7% of the vote in a loss. He was subsequently elected by the Maine Legislature to serve as Maine State Treasurer until 1978, when he was replaced by Jerrold Speers.

Cooney earned a B.A. from Lake Forest College and represented Sabattus, Maine, in the Maine House of Representatives from 1970 to 1976, where he eventually served as Chair of the State Government Committee.

Cooney was rumored to be a frontrunner for the position of State Treasurer despite his lack of financial experience because of the common practice of the majority party in the legislature appointing its losing candidates to the constitutional positions, of which State Treasurer is one. He noted this during the campaign and said that he would not seek the position, but ultimately did so. Independent Governor Jim Longley told media that he would do his "best" to work with Cooney and sought to make the State Treasurer and other elected positions appointive by the governor.

Following his stint as State Treasurer, Cooney continued in a number of Maine governmental positions, including as Director of the Bureau of General Services, Governor Joe Brennan’s Representative to the Loring Air Force Base Readjustment Committee and on Governor John Baldacci's Base Readjustment Liaison in the Department of Redevelopment, Re-Employment, and Business Support regarding the closure of the Brunswick Naval Air Station.

Cooney died on April 18, 2020, at 76 years old.

Political offices
Preceded by Rodney L. Scribner	Treasurer of Maine; 1977–1978	Succeeded by Jerrold Speers
