= Charles P. Hatch =

American accountant and politician (1868–1946)

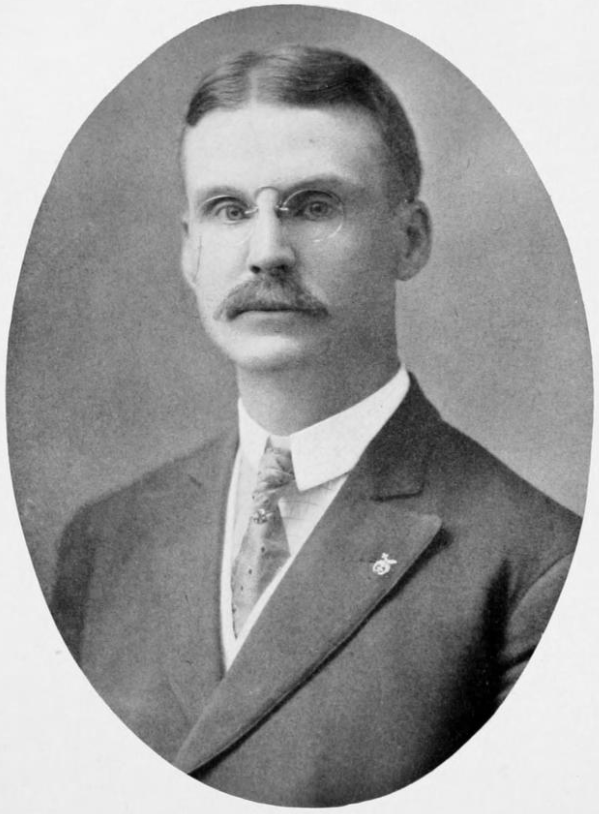

Maine State Auditor
- In office 1907–1911
- Preceded by: Position created
- Succeeded by: Lamont A. Stevens

Personal details
- Born: December 25, 1868 Lyman, Maine, U.S.
- Died: July 11, 1946 (aged 77) Yarmouth, Maine, U.S.
- Resting place: Evergreen Cemetery; Portland, Maine, U.S.
- Party: Republican
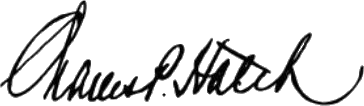
- Signature

Charles Peter Hatch (December 25, 1868 – July 11, 1946) was an American accountant who was the first State Auditor of Maine (1907–1911).

== Early life ==
Hatch was born in Lyman, Maine, on December 25, 1868, to Elijah G. and Frances Z. (Kane) Hatch. His parents died when Hatch was young and he moved to Portland, Maine at the age of fourteen. He was educated in the Portland common schools, night school, and Shaw Business College. On August 3, 1892, he married Helen L. Morrill in Buckfield, Maine.

== Career ==
From 1884 to 1887, Hatch was a clerk and stenographer in a law office. He then worked as a cashier and bookkeeper for the Maine Mutual Accident Association. In 1889, he became an assistant bank examiner in Buckfield, Maine. In 1893, he was appointed national bank examiner for Maine by president Benjamin Harrison. He remained in this position until 1903, when he resigned to work for the International Paper Company in New York City. He was head of the company's auditing and accounting department until the two departments were separated. He then headed the accounting department.

In 1907, Hatch was appointed to the newly-created position of Maine State Auditor by governor William T. Cobb. He was elected to a two-year term that fall, defeating Democratic nominee Everett M. Mower 75,381 votes to 64,110. The Republicans performed poorly in the 1910 elections. Although Hatch outperformed the head of the party's ticket, Governor Bert M. Fernald, he was defeated by Lamont A. Stevens 70,913 votes to 67,370.

After leaving office, Hatch worked as a public accountant and was involved with a number of businesses. He was president of the R. H. Morrill Company, vice president of the Merrill Trust Company, treasurer of C. Withington & Sons and the Portland Grain Company, and helped organize the Dexter Trust & Banking, Bankers Audit, and Forest City Trust companies. From 1914 to 1920, he was the president of Forest City Trust.

== Death ==
Hatch died unexpectedly on July 11, 1946, at his home in Yarmouth, Maine.
