= Laurel Hill Cemetery (Saco, Maine) =

Historic cemetery in York County, Maine, US

- Interactive map of Laurel Hill Cemetery

Details
- Established: 1844
- Location: Saco, Maine
- Country: United States
- Coordinates: 43°29′40″N 70°25′47″W
- Size: 25 acres (10 ha)
- Find a Grave: Laurel Hill Cemetery

Laurel Hill Cemetery is a historic cemetery in Saco, Maine, United States. Officially established in 1844, it was one of the first garden cemeteries in the United States. Inspired by Mount Auburn Cemetery in Cambridge, Massachusetts, the original cemetery was 25-acre (10 ha) in area and designed by Boston businessman Waldo Higginson.

== Notable interments ==
- Samuel Henry Craig (1863–1929), Medal of Honor recipient
- William H. Deering (186–1957), State representative and Augusta State Hospital Treasurer
- John Fairfield (1797–1847), US Senator and Governor of Maine
- Cyrus King (1772–1817), US Congressman
- Moses Macdonald (1815–1869), US Congressman
- Walter E. Perkins (1859–1925), actor
- John Fairfield Scamman (1786–1858), US Congressman
