= John M. Wood (politician) =

American politician (1813–1864)

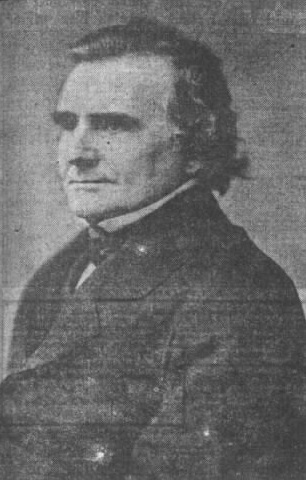

Member of the U.S. House of Representatives from Maine's 1st district
- In office March 4, 1855 – March 3, 1859
- Preceded by: Moses Macdonald
- Succeeded by: Daniel E. Somes

Member of the Maine House of Representatives
- In office 1852–1853

Personal details
- Born: November 17, 1813 Minisink, New York, US
- Died: December 24, 1864 (aged 51) Boston, Massachusetts, US
- Resting place: Greenwood Cemetery, Brooklyn, New York
- Party: Republican

John M. Wood (November 17, 1813 – December 24, 1864) was a U.S. representative from Maine.

Born in Minisink, New York, Wood attended the common schools. He engaged in railroad construction in New Jersey and moved to Portland, Maine, in 1846. He was one of the contractors in the construction of the Atlantic & St. Lawrence Railroad, and he also engaged in banking. He served as member of the Maine House of Representatives in 1852 and 1853. He was owner and publisher of the Portland Daily Advertiser from 1853 to 1857.

Wood was elected as a Republican to the Thirty-fourth and Thirty-fifth Congresses (March 4, 1855 – March 3, 1859). He was the contractor for building the Air Line Railroad between Woonsocket and New Haven, Connecticut.

Wood died while on a visit in Boston, Massachusetts, and was interred in Greenwood Cemetery, Brooklyn, New York.

U.S. House of Representatives
Preceded by Moses Macdonald	Member of the U.S. House of Representatives from Maine's 1st congressional district March 4, 1855 – March 3, 1859	Succeeded by Daniel E. Somes
