= Daniel E. Somes =

American politician (1815–1888)

Daniel Eton Somes
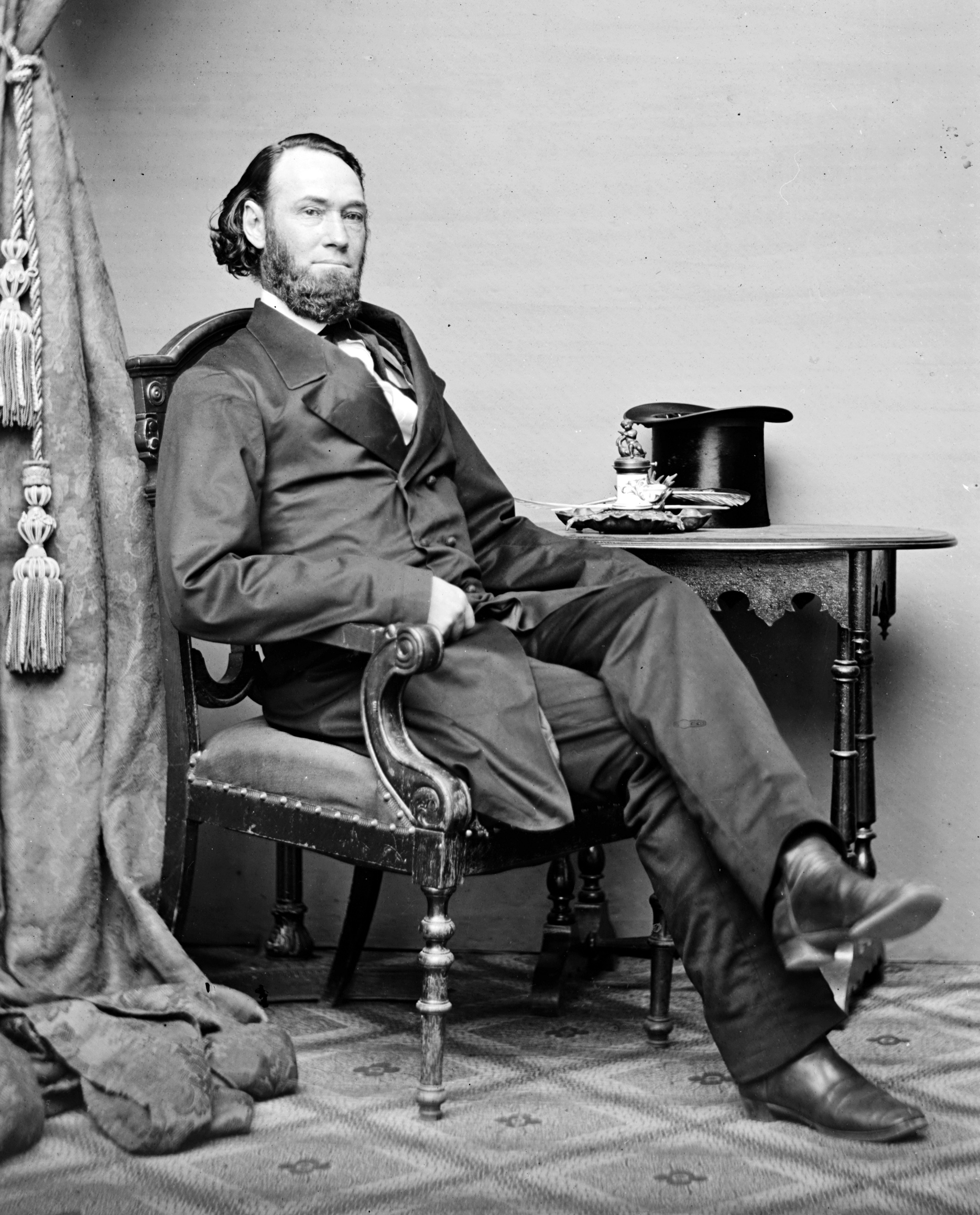

Member of the U.S. House of Representatives from Maine's 1st district
- In office March 4, 1859 – March 3, 1861
- Preceded by: John M. Wood
- Succeeded by: John N. Goodwin

1st Mayor of Biddeford, Maine
- In office 1855–1857
- Preceded by: Position established
- Succeeded by: James Andress

Personal details
- Born: May 20, 1815 Meredith, New Hampshire, U.S.
- Died: February 13, 1888 (aged 72) Washington, D.C., U.S.
- Resting place: Rock Creek Cemetery; Washington, D.C., U.S.

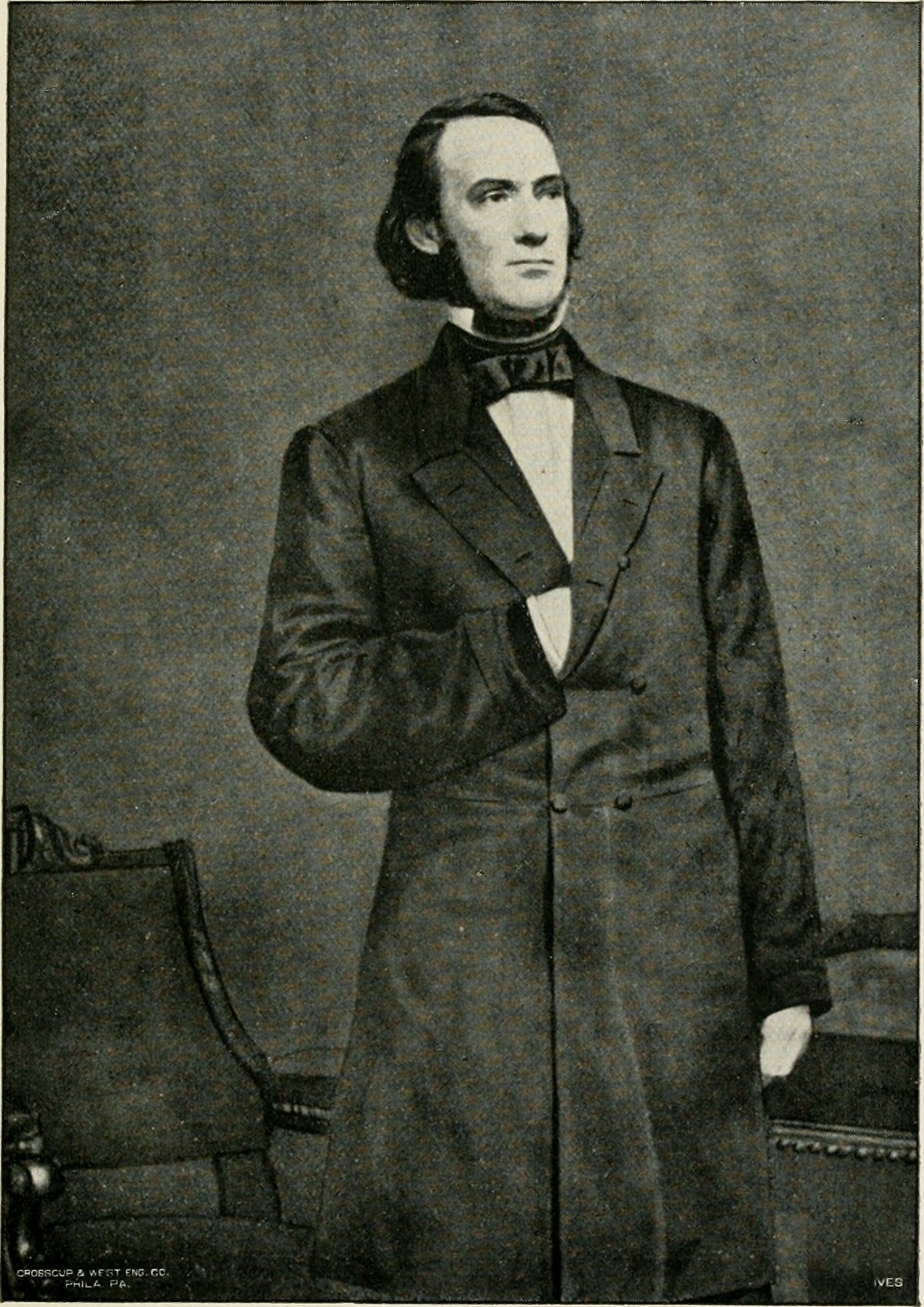
Hon. Daniel E. Somes, 1863

Daniel Eton Somes (May 20, 1815 – February 13, 1888) was a United States representative from Maine.

== Early life ==
Daniel Eton Somes was born in Meredith, New Hampshire (now Laconia) on May 20, 1815. He received an academic education, then moved to Biddeford, Maine, in 1846. He established the Eastern Journal, later known as the Union and Journal.

== Career ==
Somes engaged in the manufacture of loom harnesses, reed twine, and varnishes.

Somes was elected the first Mayor of Biddeford 1855–1857. He was president of the City Bank of Biddeford 1856–1858, and elected as a Republican to the Thirty-sixth Congress (March 4, 1859 – March 3, 1861). He was also a member of the Peace Convention of 1861 held in Washington, D.C., in an effort to devise means to prevent the impending war.

Somes and his wife are mentioned in connection with the seances conducted and the home of Cranston Laurie, a leader of the Spiritualist movement in Washington during the war. According to others, he and his wife were present when both President and Mrs. Lincoln attended the seances.

Somes engaged in the practice of patent law in Washington, D.C. until his death in that city on February 13, 1888. His interment was in Rock Creek Cemetery.

== See also ==
- List of mayors of Biddeford, Maine

U.S. House of Representatives
Preceded by John M. Wood	Member of the U.S. House of Representatives from Maine's 1st congressional district March 4, 1859 – March 3, 1861	Succeeded by John N. Goodwin
Political offices
Preceded by None	1st Mayor of Biddeford, Maine; 1855-1857	Succeeded by James Andress
