= Roy L. Wardwell =

American newspaper publisher and politician (1874–1949)

Maine State Auditor
- In office 1917–1922
- Preceded by: J. Edward Sullivan
- Succeeded by: Elbert D. Hayford

Personal details
- Born: October 29, 1874 Penobscot, Maine, U.S.
- Died: October 17, 1949 (aged 74) Portland, Maine, U.S.
- Resting place: Evergreen Cemetery; Portland, Maine, U.S.
- Party: Republican
- Spouse: Winifred L. Cushman (m. 1909)
- Children: 3
- Occupation: Sailor; Accountant; Newspaper publisher

Roy L. Wardwell (October 29, 1874 – October 17, 1949) was an American newspaper publisher and politician who was the Maine State Auditor from 1917 to 1922.

== Early life ==
Wardwell was born in Penobscot, Maine, on October 29, 1874, to LeRoy and Caroline (Buker) Wardwell. At the age of 14, he went to sea as a cabin boy. He rose to the position of master before retiring in 1898. He then worked as a clerk for the McDonald Manufacturing Company and took accounting courses at Gray's Business College. On May 28, 1900, he married Winifred L. Cushman in Penobscot. They had three children.

== Career ==
Wardwell moved to Augusta, Maine to become an accountant for the Cushnoc Paper Company. He was elected to the Augusta city council in 1909 and became the city's treasurer in 1915. He was the Republican nominee for Maine State Auditor in 1916, 1918, and 1920 and won all three elections. In 1921, Wardwell resigned to become the treasurer and general manager Gannett Publishing Co., a position he held until 1935.

== Death ==
Wardwell died on October 17, 1949 at his home in Portland, Maine.
