= Gail M. Chase =

American politician

Gail Chase

18th State Auditor of Maine
- In office January 3, 1997 – January 7, 2005
- Governor: Angus King; John Baldacci
- Preceded by: Rodney L. Scribner
- Succeeded by: Neria Douglass

Member of the Maine House of Representatives
- In office December 2, 1992 – December 4, 1996
- Preceded by: Paul Parent
- Succeeded by: Randy Bumps
- Constituency: 85th district (1992‍–‍1994); 106th district (1994‍–‍1996)

Personal details
- Born: Pawtucket, Rhode Island, United States
- Party: Democratic
- Spouse: Stevan Gressitt (died 2017)
- Education: Colby College (BA)
- Occupation: Auditor; politician; consultant

Gail M. Chase is an American accountant. A Democrat, Chase was elected Maine State Auditor in 1996 by the Maine Legislature. She and other constitutional officers were sworn in by Governor Angus King on January 3, 1997. Re-elected in 2000, she until the end of her term in January 2005 when she was replaced by fellow Democrat Neria Douglass.

Chase is originally from Pawtucket, Rhode Island and graduated from Colby College in 1974. She was elected to the Maine House of Representatives in 1992 and 1994. She unsuccessfully sought a seat in the Maine Senate in 2006. She is married and lives in Unity, Maine.
