= William H. Deering =

American politician (1886–1957)

William Hall Deering (July 21, 1886 – August 10, 1957) was an American politician and government official from Maine who was a member of the Maine House of Representatives from 1925 to 1929 and the state's budget officer from 1932 to 1940.

== Early life ==
Deering was born on July 21, 1886 in Saco, Maine, to Gilman N. and Miriam Hall Deering. He prepared for college at the Thornton Academy and Worcester Academy. He attended Dartmouth College for two years but left to work in the meatpacking business with his father at Swift and Company in Saco. He later managed the Deering family's farm and tenement. On October 8, 1912, he married Elsie Ham in Saco. They had no children.

== Career ==
From 1925 to 1929, Deering served two terms in the Maine House of Representatives as a Republican. During the 1929–30 legislative session, he was clerk of the committee on Appropriations and Financial Affairs.

In 1932, governor William Tudor Gardiner appointed Deering to the newly-created position of state budget officer. In 1935, he took on the additional role of business manager and treasurer of the Augusta State Hospital. He resigned as budget officer in 1940 to focus on his duties at the state hospital. He remained in this position until his death on August 10, 1957. He is buried in a family plot at Laurel Hill Cemetery in Saco.
