= Samuel Shapiro (Maine politician) =

American politician (born 1927)

State Treasurer of Maine
- In office 1981–1996

Personal details
- Born: August 26, 1927 (age 99) Brownsville, Pennsylvania, U.S.
- Party: Democratic
- Education: University of Pittsburgh

Samuel Shapiro (born August 26, 1927) is an American politician in the state of Maine. A Democrat, Shapiro served from 1981 to 1996 as State Treasurer of Maine.

Shapiro was born in Brownsville, Pennsylvania to Jewish immigrant parents from Ukraine and Lithuania. He spent two years in the U.S. Navy and then attended the University of Pittsburgh on the G.I. bill. He then moved to Waterville, Maine, where he ran several furniture stores owned by his father-in-law. Shapiro eventually became the treasurer of the Maine Democratic Party for thirteen years. He served as state treasurer of Maine from 1981 to 1996.

Political offices
Preceded by Jerrold Speers	Treasurer of Maine; 1981–1996	Succeeded by Dale McCormick
