= Herbert W. Trafton =

American politician

64th Speaker of the Maine House of Representatives
- In office 1915–1917
- Preceded by: John A. Peters
- Succeeded by: William L. Bonney

Member of the Maine House of Representatives from Fort Fairfield
- In office 1911–1918

Personal details
- Born: Herbert Walter Trafton; May 26, 1864 Fort Fairfield, Maine, U.S.
- Died: August 20, 1936 (aged 72) Augusta, Maine, U.S.
- Party: Democratic
- Spouse: Kate Winslow (m. 1891)
- Education: Colby College

Herbert Walter Trafton (May 26, 1864 – August 20, 1936) was an American politician from Maine. Trafton, a Democrat from Fort Fairfield, Maine, served two terms in the Maine House of Representatives. He was first elected in 1910 and again in 1914. During the 1915–1916 session, Trafton was House Speaker. He later served 18 years as a member of the Maine Public Utilities Commission.
