= Joseph C. Boyd =

American soldier and politician

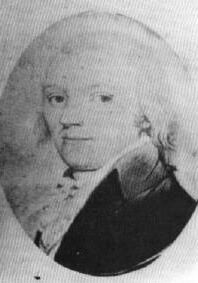
Joseph C. Boyd

Joseph Coffin Boyd (July 23, 1760 - May 12, 1823) was an American soldier and politician. He served as the first Maine State Treasurer from 1820 to 1822. He served as paymaster for the United States during the War of 1812.

Joseph Coffin Boyd was born one of nine children to James Boyd and Susannah Coffin. His father was the son of Robert Boyd, the fourth son of the 1st Earl of Kilmarnock. Samuel S. Boyd was his son, and Lloyd Tilghman was his son-in-law.
