= David Lemoine =

American politician (born 1957)

David G. Lemoine

Member of the Maine House of Representatives from the 20th District
- In office 1998–2004
- Preceded by: George J. Kerr
- Succeeded by: George W. Hogan, Sr.

48th Treasurer of Maine
- In office January 2005 – January 2010
- Governor: John Baldacci
- Preceded by: Dale McCormick
- Succeeded by: Bruce Poliquin

Personal details
- Born: David George Lemoine; May 25, 1957 (age 69) Waterville, Maine, U.S.
- Party: Democratic
- Education: Colby College

David George Lemoine (born May 25, 1957) is an American politician from Maine. Lemoine, a Democrat served in the Maine House of Representatives from 1998 to 2004 prior to serving as the State Treasurer of Maine from 2005 to 2010.

== Career ==
Lemoine was born in Waterville, Maine to Margaret Hatch Marden and George Macalease Lemoine. His mother was the daughter of a potato farmer in Freedom, Maine and his father was a Waterville native and Korean War veteran. He grew up in Waterville and graduated from Waterville High School prior to attending Colby College. At Colby, he majored in government. After graduating, he interned with Senator Edmund Muskie's office in Washington, D.C. and worked for the Senate Sergeant at Arms Office until Muskie became United States Secretary of State. He then served on George J. Mitchell's staff. In 1988, he graduated from the University of Maine School of Law and in 1998 was elected to serve the first of three consecutive terms in the Maine House of Representatives, representing Old Orchard Beach. In 2004 he was elected as Maine State Treasurer and was reelected in 2006 and 2008.

Political offices
| Preceded by Dale McCormick | Treasurer of Maine; 2005–2011 | Succeeded by Bruce Poliquin |
