= List of mayors of Ellsworth, Maine =

The following is a list of mayors and council chairs of the city of Ellsworth, Maine, United States.

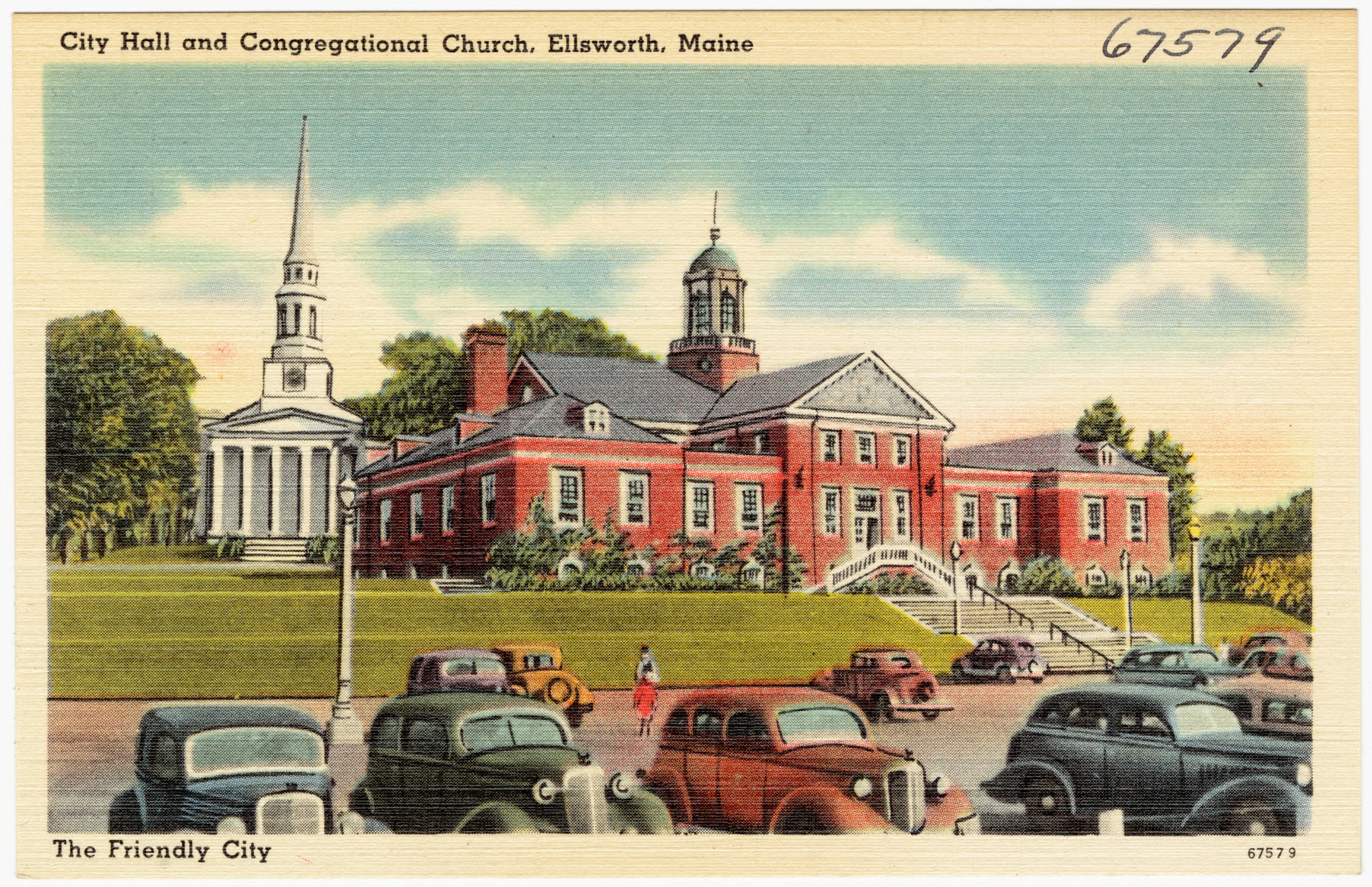
View of city hall building in Ellsworth, Maine, circa 1930s

== Mayors ==
- James F. Davis, 1869–1870, 1883
- Calvin G. Peck, 1871-1872
- Monroe Young, 1873, 1876-1877
- Jos. T Grant, 1874–1875, 1878
- Jas. F. Davis, 1879-1880
- Roscoe Holmes, 1881-1882
- John B. Redman, 1884-1885
- H. B. Mason, 1886-1887
- F. B. Aiken, 1888-1889
- Jas. F. Davis, 1890-1891
- Albert H. Norris, 1892
- Nehemiah H. Higgins, 1893-1894
- George P. Dutton, 1895
- Robert Gerry, 1896
- Henry E. Davis, 1897
- Jos. M. Higgins, 1898
- Arthur W. Greely, 1899–1902, 1907
- A. C. Hagerthy, 1903–1906, 1910, 1914-1919
- Frank F. Simonton, 1908-1909
- Chas. H. Leland, 1911
- John A. Cunningham, 1912-1913
- Frank D. Heath, 1920
- George S. Foster, 1921-1923
- Lewis Hodgkins, 1924-1926
- Monroe Y. McGown, ca.1927-1930

== City council chairs ==
- Gary Fortier, ca.2011
- Michelle Beal, ca.2024

== See also ==
- Ellsworth City Hall
- Ellsworth history
