= George S. Foster =

American politician (1874–1936)

Maine State Treasurer
- In office 1933–1936
- Preceded by: Louis H. Winship
- Succeeded by: Louis H. Winship

Mayor of Ellsworth, Maine
- In office 1921–1923
- Preceded by: Frank D. Heath
- Succeeded by: Lewis Hodgkins

Personal details
- Born: October 19, 1874 Ellsworth, Maine, U.S.
- Died: August 24, 1936 (aged 61) Bangor, Maine, U.S.
- Party: Republican

George Silsby Foster (October 19, 1874 – August 24, 1936) was an American politician who was mayor of Ellsworth, Maine from 1921 to 1923 and Maine State Treasurer from 1933 until his death in 1936.

== Early life ==
Foster was born on October 19, 1874. He was the eldest of three children born to Lorenzo D. and Sara Elizabeth (Lowell) Foster. Lorenzo Foster owned a large lumber firm. Foster graduated from Ellsworth High School and spent eighteen years away from his native town before returning to enter the lumber business. He was a member of the firm, Moore, Foster and Hillgrove, which sold pulp wood and timber and owned the George S. Dodge Corp., a wholesale confectionery and tobacco business. Foster was also treasurer of the Carroll Felt Shoe Company.

== Politics ==
In 1921, the Democratic and Republican parties of Ellsworth selected a joint, non-partisan ticket headed by Foster for mayor. He was elected to three, one-year terms. In 1924, 1926, and 1928, he was elected as a Republican to represent Hancock County in the Maine House of Representatives. He then served one term in the Maine Senate.

In 1933, Foster was unopposed for the Republican nomination for Maine State Treasurer. As the Republicans controlled nearly two-thirds of the legislature, he was easily elected. He was reelected in 1935.

== Death ==
In late April 1936, Foster's right hip was injured after he was dragged by his automobile. He entered Eastern Maine General Hospital on May 1, where an X-ray revealed a fracture. On August 14, The Lewiston Daily Sun reported that "complications set in" and Foster was in serious condition. He died on August 24 from an abscessed lung.
