= Walter E. Perkins =

American actor

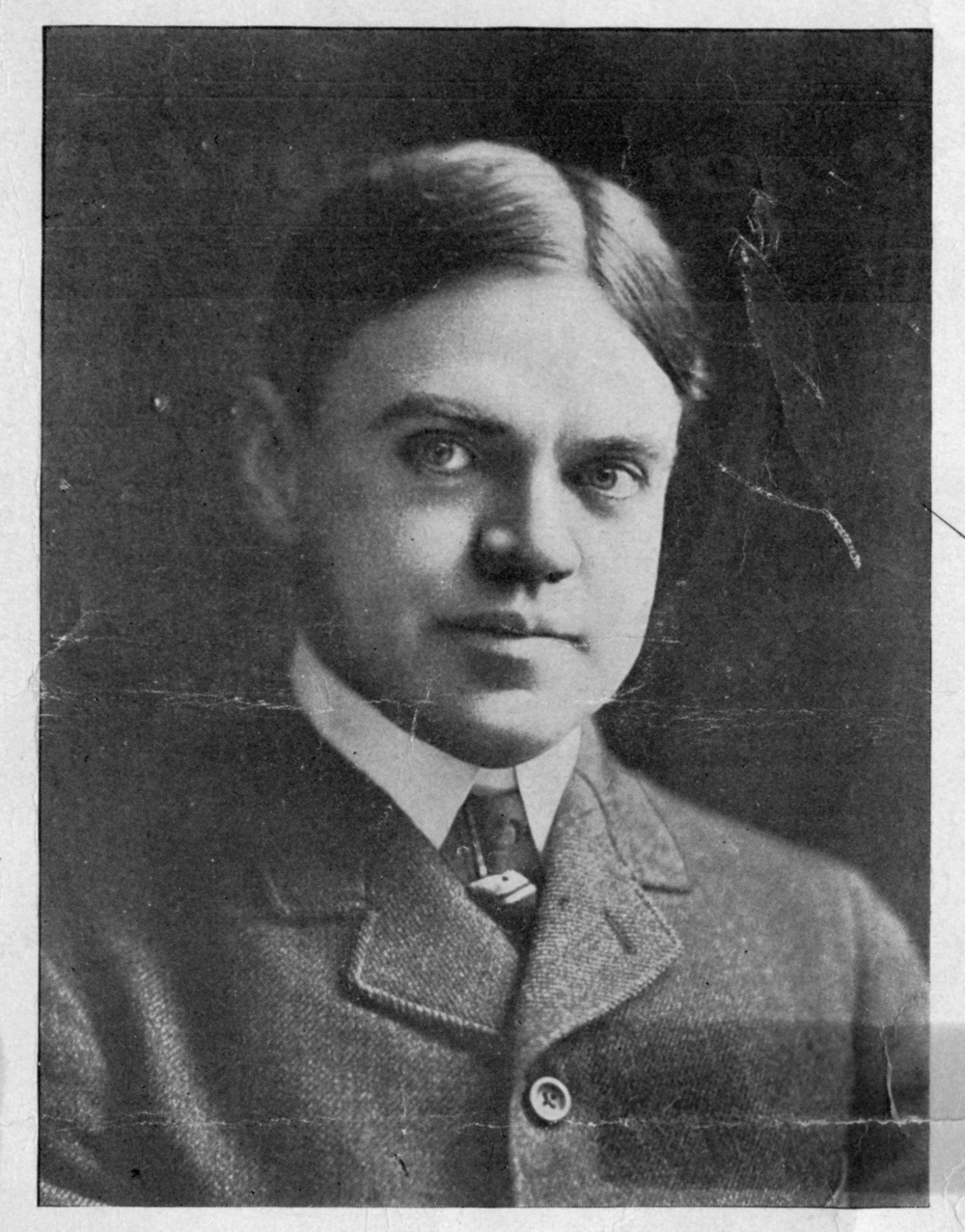
- Born: 1859; Biddeford, Maine, US
- Died: 3 June 1925 (aged 65–66); Brooklyn, New York, US
- Resting place: Laurel Hill Cemetery Saco, Maine, USA
- Parent(s): Jotham; Ruth

Walter Eugene Perkins (1859–1925) was an American stage and film actor, known for his performances in films such as My Friend from India (1914), Who Goes There? (1914) and Paying His Debt (1918).

== Biography ==
Walter Perkins was born in Biddeford, Maine, USA as one of the four children born to Jotham and Ruth (Andrews) Perkins. His early life and schooling was in Biddeford where his father ran a boot and shoe shop. At age 14, Walter started an amateur newspaper, "The Snow Flake". He was a collector of newspapers and had a collection of over 130 papers from 25 states and Canada, and had an interest in telegraphy, which he started studying during his school years. Walter was also known to be active in productions put on by the Universalist Society, of which he was a member. Walter graduated from Biddeford High School in 1876.

From a telegraph operator to a stage actor to a film actor, Walter Perkins' life covered numerous stage shows and sixteen films. He died in Brooklyn, New York, on June 3, 1925, following a short illness caused by food poisoning.

Perkins was memorialized both in Maine and back in New York. His New York funeral took place at the famous Frank E. Campbell funeral chapel on Madison Avenue, which hosted the funerals of such celebrities as Rudolph Valentino, Greta Garbo, Frank Costello, "Fatty" Arbuckle, Arturo Toscanini and George Gershwin. The next day Perkins' remains arrived home in Biddeford for the local funeral at the family home on Chadwick Place, and he was then laid to rest at the family plot at Laurel Hill Cemetery in Saco. In this tribute, written to accompany his obituary in the Biddeford Daily Journal by Mrs. Estelle Tatterson, Perkins was remembered as:

"Walter had no enemies. His acquaintances were at once his friends. That was one of his greatest gifts—friendship. He never married. There were too many flowers in Cupid's garden for him to choose. He loved them all. His friends are thankful that he had not to pass through long months of suffering, but left us as he would have desired. All honor to a beloved son of old Biddeford and let us all stop in our busy lives to pay a silent tribute and offer a silent prayer of thanksgiving for having known Walter E. Perkins, gentleman."

== Career ==
Perkins started his career as a telegraph operator at the Eastern Division station of the Boston & Maine railroad in Biddeford. A year later, he left for Boston to pursue his dream of becoming a stage actor. Until the 1920s, he played small parts in various comedies when he was hired by Charles Frohman, a Broadway producer. The first notable role came his way, at age 37, when his friend Henry A. Souchet wrote a part specially for Perkins in his farcical play My Friend from India. The play, which opened on 6 October 1896 at the Bijou Theatre on Broadway, was a success and elevated the status of both the actor and the author, with Perkins in the starring role as "A. Keene Shaver".

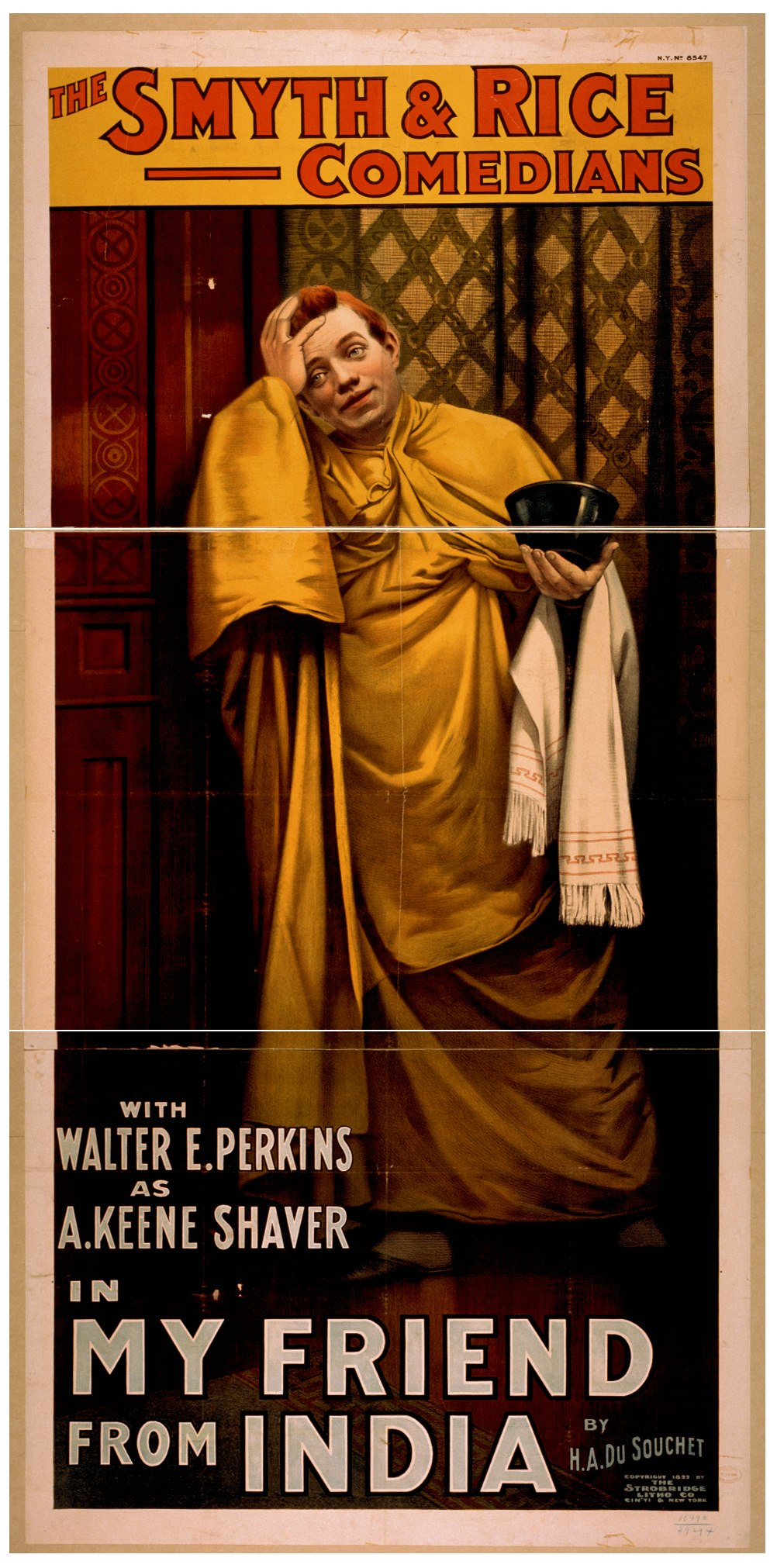
Advertisement for My Friend From India, 1899.

Du Souchet and Perkins had a successful professional relationship, and went on to produce other successful shows including The Man from Mexico, Toppy, and Who Goes There? together. Who Goes There? is considered one of Perkins' biggest hits. He also had successes in non-Du Souchet productions, including All the Comforts of Home, Charley's Aunt (in which he acted in drag), The Lost Paradise, Held by the Enemy, and Pa Potter. Perkins is reported to have played in every city and town of consequence in every state of the Union, though much of his time was spent in the long runs of his several successes in the bigger cities of the country.

Through his performances across the country, Perkins reportedly became famous as a comedic actor. He was playing at the Majestic Theatre in San Francisco after 1906 earthquake when the great earthquake and fire of 1906 struck. He was uninjured and offered accounts of the experience to the Biddeford papers. Walter Perkins appeared in sixteen screen films from 1914 to 1922, some of which were adaptations of his stage work. Perkins continued to act in productions across the U.S. and Canada until his death.
