= Elbert D. Hayford =

American government official (1872–1947)

Maine State Auditor
- In office 1922–1940
- Preceded by: Roy L. Wardwell
- Succeeded by: William D. Hayes

Personal details
- Born: July 18, 1872 Rockport, Indiana, U.S.
- Died: April 23, 1947 (aged 74) Farmingdale, Maine, U.S.
- Resting place: Oak Grove Cemetery; Gardiner, Maine, U.S.
- Party: Republican
- Spouses: Mary Eldridge Hayford (m. 1901; died 1917); Gerturde L. Boothby (m. 1919)
- Children: 7
- Occupation: Lawyer; Auditor

Elbert Daniel Hayford (July 18, 1872 – April 23, 1947) was an American government official who was Maine State Auditor from 1922 to 1940.

== Early life ==
Hayford was born in Rockport, Indiana, on July 18, 1872, to Daniel and Virginia E. (Brown) Hayford. He graduated from Rockport High School in 1890 and studied to become a printer. From 1893 to 1895, he attended Indiana University Bloomington. In 1897, he moved to Perry, Oklahoma and read law in the office of his brother-in-law, Lane B. Osborn. On June 28, 1898, he enlisted in the 1st Territorial Volunteer Infantry. The unit was formed to fight in the Philippines during the Spanish–American War, but the war ended before its could be sent overseas. Hayford mustered out on February 13, 1899, and resumed his legal studies with Osborn, who was now in Evansville, Indiana.

== Move to Maine ==
Hayford was admitted to the bar in 1899 and practiced in Evansville until 1901. On September 30, 1901, Hayford married a distant cousin, Mary Eldridge Hayford, in Canton, Maine. Hayford moved to Maine and established a law office in Portland, Maine. Mary Hayford died in 1917 and Hayford later married Gerturde L. Boothby. They had seven children.

== Career ==
From 1902 to 1905, Hayford was special counsel for the state board of assessors. In 1907, he became the chief clerk to the state auditor. He remained in this role until 1921, except for a two-year period (1915–1917), when the office was held by a member of the Democratic Party (J. Edward Sullivan).

In 1919, Hayford was appointed by governor Carl Milliken to prepare the state budget. In 1921, he was appointed clerk of the Maine Legislature's budget committee.

In 1921, state auditor Roy L. Wardwell resigned to accept a position with Gannett Publishing Co. Hayford was appointed by governor Percival P. Baxter to fill the remainder of Wardwell's term and ran for a full term in the 1922 election. He won a three-way Republican primary, receiving 20,337 votes to Edward J. Morrill's 20,128 and Maurice W. Bragdon's 16,331, and easily defeated the Democratic nominee Frank R. Madden. He was reelected in 1924, 1926, 1928, and 1930. Starting in 1931, the state auditor was elected by the Maine Legislature instead of by popular vote.

== Runnells scandal and resignation ==
On December 27, 1939, Hayford certified the receipts and expenditures of state controller William A. Runnells to be in order. However, due to criticism of state finances from political figures and the press, Hayford and Runnells requested an independent audit. During the audit, Runnells was hospitalized with two gunshot wounds to the chest, which he claimed was from an accident, not a suicide attempt. On April 9, 1940, Ernst & Ernst reported that $35,000 in funds managed by Runnells had gone missing. Runnells was charged with embezzlement. On April 11, 1940, Governor Lewis O. Barrows demanded that Hayford and deputy state treasurer, Louis H. Winship, resign due to "inefficiency and inaccurate reports in handling state finances", which both men immediately did.

== Later life ==
On December 27, 1940, Hayford returned to state government as a special investigator for the emergency municipal finance board. He died on April 23, 1947, at his home in Farmingdale, Maine.
