= J. Edward Sullivan =

American politician (1879–1951)

Maine State Auditor
- In office 1915–1917
- Preceded by: Timothy F. Callahan
- Succeeded by: Roy L. Wardwell

Personal details
- Born: May 26, 1879 Hampden, Maine, U.S.
- Died: October 10, 1951 (aged 72) Bangor, Maine, U.S.
- Resting place: Mount Pleasant Catholic Cemetery; Bangor, Maine, U.S.
- Party: Democratic
- Spouse: Genevieve C. McLaughlin (m. 1903)

Joseph Edward Sullivan (May 6, 1879 – October 10, 1951) was an American politician who was Maine State Auditor from 1915 to 1917.

== Early life ==
Sullivan was born in Hampden, Maine, on May 6, 1879, to Timothy D. and Margaret (O'Callaghan) Sullivan. On June 24, 1903, Sullivan married Genevieve C. McLaughlin in Bangor, Maine.

== Career ==
Sullivan was active in Democratic Party politics and served on the Bangor board of aldermen. In 1914, he was a candidate for Maine State Auditor. He defeated John E. Bunker for the Democratic nomination and beat Republican incumbent Timothy F. Callahan in the general election. He was defeated for reelection in 1916 by Republican Roy L. Wardwell 81,869 votes to 57,908.

== Later life ==
Following his defeat, Sullivan worked for the Employer's Liability Corportation. He died on October 10, 1951 at a hospital in Bangor.
