= William S. Owen =

American businessman and politician (1869–1941)

Maine State Treasurer
- In office 1927–1932
- Preceded by: William L. Bonney
- Succeeded by: Louis H. Winship

Personal details
- Born: November 18, 1869 Milo, Maine, U.S.
- Died: March 16, 1941 (aged 71) Milo, Maine, U.S.
- Party: Republican
- Spouse: Hattie Scripture (m. 1890; died 1941)
- Children: 2
- Education: University of Buffalo
- Occupation: Druggist

William Sumner Owen (November 18, 1869 – March 16, 1941) was an American businessman and politician who was Maine State Treasurer from 1927 to 1932 and Maine Commissioner of Finance from 1932 to 1940.

== Early life ==
Owen was born in Milo, Maine, on November 18, 1869, to William H. and Clara M. (Johnson) Owen. On December 6, 1890, he married Hattie Scripture in Milo. They had two children. In 1896, he graduated from the University of Buffalo pharmacy school.

== Business career ==
Owen began working as a druggist in 1888. In 1905, he started an insurance firm. Owen was also president of the Walton Hardware Company, vice president of the Kineo Trust Company, and treasurer of the Milo Electric Light & Power Company and the Milo Water Company.

== Politics ==
Owen served as Milo's town treasurer and as treasurer of Piscataquis County. He was a member of the Maine Senate from 1904 to 1905 and the Maine House of Representatives from 1919 to 1923. From 1923 to 1925, he represented the sixth district on the Maine executive council.

In 1927, Owen was elected Maine State Treasurer by the Maine Legislature. He remained in this role until 1932, when he was appointed to the position of finance commissioner by Governor William Tudor Gardiner. In 1940, Owen was one of four government officials to resign after his subordinate, state controller William A. Runnells, was indicted for embezzlement.

== Death ==
Owen died from heart disease on March 16, 1941 at his home in Milo. His wife had died only eleven days earlier.
