= Pola Buckley =

American accountant

Pola Buckley is an American accountant and the 20th Maine State Auditor. A Democrat, she was elected by the Maine Legislature to her position on January 7, 2013 serving until January, 2021, when she was succeeded by Matthew Dunlap and then Jacob Norton shortly after.

Buckley earned a Bachelor of Science degree in accounting from Boston College, and a master's degree in Business Administration from Thomas College.
