= Maine's 1st congressional district =

U.S. House district for Maine

Coordinates: 43°49′50″N 69°56′27″W

- Interactive map of district boundaries since January 3, 2023
- Representative: Chellie Pingree; D–North Haven
- Distribution: 50.57% rural; 49.43% urban
- Population (2025): 708,936
- Median household income: $95,271
- Ethnicity: 89.4% White; 3.9% Two or more races; 2.2% Black; 2.2% Hispanic; 1.6% Asian; 0.6% other
- Cook PVI: D+11

Maine's 1st congressional district is a congressional district in the U.S. state of Maine. The geographically smaller of the state's two congressional districts, the district covers the southern coastal area of the state. The district consists of all of Cumberland, Knox, Lincoln, Sagadahoc, and York counties, and most of Kennebec County. Located within the district are the cities of Portland, Brunswick, and Saco. The district is currently represented by Democrat Chellie Pingree.

== History ==
Maine was initially a part of the state of Massachusetts. Massachusetts was allocated 20 districts after the 1810 U.S. census. When Maine became a state in 1820, seven of those districts were credited to it. Since then, all but the 1st and 2nd congressional districts have become obsolete.

== Counties and municipalities ==
For the 118th and successive Congresses (based on redistricting following the 2020 census), the district contains all or portions of the following counties and municipalities:

Cumberland County (28)
All 28 municipalities

Kennebec County (11)
Albion, Benton, China, Clinton, Litchfield, Pittston, Vassalboro, Waterville, West Gardiner, Windsor, Winslow

Knox County (19)
All 19 municipalities

Lincoln County (19)
All 19 municipalities

Sagadahoc County (10)
All 10 municipalities

York County (29)
All 29 municipalities

== Recent election results from statewide races ==
Year	Office	Results
2008	President	Obama 61% - 37%
2008	Senate	Collins 58% - 42%
2012	President	Obama 61% - 39%
2014	Senate	Collins 66% - 34%
2014	Governor	Michaud 46% - 45%
2016	President	Clinton 54% - 39%
2018	Senate	King 57% - 31%
2018	Governor	Mills 56% - 39%
2020	President	Biden 60% - 37%
2020	Senate	Gideon 49% - 45%
2022	Governor	Mills 63% - 36%
2024	President	Harris 60% - 38%
2024	Senate	King 55% - 30%
2026	Senate	Jackson 61% - 38%
2026	Governor	Pingree 62% - 29%

== List of members representing the district ==
Member (Residence)	Party	Years ↑	Cong ress	Electoral history	District location
District created March 4, 1821
Joseph Dane (Kennebunk)	Federalist	March 4, 1821 – March 3, 1823	17th	Redistricted from the at-large district and re-elected in 1820. Retired.	1821–1823; York County: Alfred, Arundel, Berwick, Biddeford, Elliot, Hollis, Kennebunk, Kittery, Lebanon, Limerick, Lyman, Newfield, Saco, Sanford, Shapleigh, South Berwick, Waterborough, Wells, York
William Burleigh (South Berwick)	Democratic-Republican	March 4, 1823 – March 3, 1825	18th 19th 20th	Elected in 1823. Re-elected in 1824. Re-elected in 1826. Died.	1823–1833; York County: Alfred, Berwick, Biddeford, Buxton, Elliot, Hollis, Kennebunk, Kennebunk Port, Kittery, Lebanon, Limerick, Lyman, Newfield, Parsonsfield, Saco, Sanford, Shapleigh, South Berwick, Waterborough, Wells, York
William Burleigh (South Berwick)	Anti-Jacksonian	March 4, 1825 – July 2, 1827	18th 19th 20th	Elected in 1823. Re-elected in 1824. Re-elected in 1826. Died.	1823–1833; York County: Alfred, Berwick, Biddeford, Buxton, Elliot, Hollis, Kennebunk, Kennebunk Port, Kittery, Lebanon, Limerick, Lyman, Newfield, Parsonsfield, Saco, Sanford, Shapleigh, South Berwick, Waterborough, Wells, York
Vacant		July 2, 1827 – September 10, 1827	20th		1823–1833; York County: Alfred, Berwick, Biddeford, Buxton, Elliot, Hollis, Kennebunk, Kennebunk Port, Kittery, Lebanon, Limerick, Lyman, Newfield, Parsonsfield, Saco, Sanford, Shapleigh, South Berwick, Waterborough, Wells, York
Rufus McIntire (Parsonsfield)	Jacksonian	September 10, 1827 – March 3, 1835	20th 21st 22nd 23rd	Elected to finish Burleigh's term. Re-elected in 1828. Re-elected in 1830. Re-elected in 1833. Retired.	1823–1833; York County: Alfred, Berwick, Biddeford, Buxton, Elliot, Hollis, Kennebunk, Kennebunk Port, Kittery, Lebanon, Limerick, Lyman, Newfield, Parsonsfield, Saco, Sanford, Shapleigh, South Berwick, Waterborough, Wells, York
Rufus McIntire (Parsonsfield)	Jacksonian	September 10, 1827 – March 3, 1835	20th 21st 22nd 23rd	Elected to finish Burleigh's term. Re-elected in 1828. Re-elected in 1830. Re-elected in 1833. Retired.	1833–1843 [data missing]
John Fairfield (Saco)	Democratic	March 4, 1835 – December 24, 1838	24th 25th	Elected in 1834. Re-elected in 1836. Retired to run for governor and resigned when elected.	1833–1843 [data missing]
Vacant		December 24, 1838 – March 3, 1839	25th		1833–1843 [data missing]
Nathan Clifford (Newfield)	Democratic	March 4, 1839 – March 3, 1843	26th 27th	Elected in 1838. Re-elected in 1840. Retired.	1833–1843 [data missing]
Joshua Herrick (Kennebunkport)	Democratic	March 4, 1843 – March 3, 1845	28th	Elected in 1843. Lost renomination.	1843–1853 [data missing]
John Fairfield Scamman (Saco)	Democratic	March 4, 1845 – March 3, 1847	29th	Elected in 1844. Retired.	1843–1853 [data missing]
David Hammons (Lovell)	Democratic	March 4, 1847 – March 3, 1849	30th	Elected in 1846. Retired.	1843–1853 [data missing]
Elbridge Gerry (Waterford)	Democratic	March 4, 1849 – March 3, 1851	31st	Elected in 1848. Retired.	1843–1853 [data missing]
Moses Macdonald (Portland)	Democratic	March 4, 1851 – March 3, 1855	32nd 33rd	Elected in 1850. Re-elected in 1852. Retired.	1843–1853 [data missing]
Moses Macdonald (Portland)	Democratic	March 4, 1851 – March 3, 1855	32nd 33rd	Elected in 1850. Re-elected in 1852. Retired.	1853–1863 [data missing]
John M. Wood (Portland)	Republican	March 4, 1855 – March 3, 1859	34th 35th	Elected in 1854. Re-elected in 1856. Retired.	1853–1863 [data missing]
Daniel E. Somes (Biddeford)	Republican	March 4, 1859 – March 3, 1861	36th	Elected in 1858. Retired.	1853–1863 [data missing]
John N. Goodwin (South Berwick)	Republican	March 4, 1861 – March 3, 1863	37th	Elected in 1860. Lost re-election.	1853–1863 [data missing]
Lorenzo De Medici Sweat (Portland)	Democratic	March 4, 1863 – March 3, 1865	38th	Elected in 1862. Lost re-election.	1863–1873 [data missing]
John Lynch (Portland)	Republican	March 4, 1865 – March 3, 1873	39th 40th 41st 42nd	Elected in 1864. Re-elected in 1866. Re-elected in 1868. Re-elected in 1870. Retired.	1863–1873 [data missing]
John H. Burleigh (South Berwick)	Republican	March 4, 1873 – March 3, 1877	43rd 44th	Elected in 1872. Re-elected in 1874. Lost renomination.	1873–1883 [data missing]
Thomas Brackett Reed (Portland)	Republican	March 4, 1877 – March 3, 1883	45th 46th 47th	Elected in 1876. Re-elected in 1878. Re-elected in 1880. Redistricted to the at-large district.	1873–1883 [data missing]
District inactive		March 3, 1883 – March 3, 1885	48th	At-large districts used.	1873–1883 [data missing]
Thomas Brackett Reed (Portland)	Republican	March 4, 1885 – September 4, 1899	49th 50th 51st 52nd 53rd 54th 55th 56th	Redistricted from the at-large district and re-elected in 1884. Re-elected in 1886. Re-elected in 1888. Re-elected in 1890. Re-elected in 1892. Re-elected in 1894. Re-elected in 1896. Re-elected in 1898. Resigned to protest the Spanish–American War.	1885–1893 [data missing]
Thomas Brackett Reed (Portland)	Republican	March 4, 1885 – September 4, 1899	49th 50th 51st 52nd 53rd 54th 55th 56th	Redistricted from the at-large district and re-elected in 1884. Re-elected in 1886. Re-elected in 1888. Re-elected in 1890. Re-elected in 1892. Re-elected in 1894. Re-elected in 1896. Re-elected in 1898. Resigned to protest the Spanish–American War.	1893–1903 [data missing]
Vacant		September 4, 1899 – November 6, 1899	56th		1893–1903 [data missing]
Amos L. Allen (Alfred)	Republican	November 6, 1899 – February 20, 1911	56th 57th 58th 59th 60th 61st	Elected to finish Reed's term. Re-elected in 1900. Re-elected in 1902. Re-elected in 1904. Re-elected in 1906. Re-elected in 1908. Retired but died before next term.	1893–1903 [data missing]
Amos L. Allen (Alfred)	Republican	November 6, 1899 – February 20, 1911	56th 57th 58th 59th 60th 61st	Elected to finish Reed's term. Re-elected in 1900. Re-elected in 1902. Re-elected in 1904. Re-elected in 1906. Re-elected in 1908. Retired but died before next term.	1903–1913 [data missing]
Asher C. Hinds (Portland)	Republican	March 4, 1911 – March 3, 1917	62nd 63rd 64th	Elected in 1910. Re-elected in 1912. Re-elected in 1914. Retired.	1903–1913 [data missing]
Asher C. Hinds (Portland)	Republican	March 4, 1911 – March 3, 1917	62nd 63rd 64th	Elected in 1910. Re-elected in 1912. Re-elected in 1914. Retired.	1913–1933 [data missing]
Louis B. Goodall (Sanford)	Republican	March 4, 1917 – March 3, 1921	65th 66th	Elected in 1916. Re-elected in 1918. Retired.	1913–1933 [data missing]
Carroll L. Beedy (Portland)	Republican	March 4, 1921 – January 3, 1935	67th 68th 69th 70th 71st 72nd 73rd	Elected in 1920. Re-elected in 1922. Re-elected in 1924. Re-elected in 1926. Re-elected in 1928. Re-elected in 1930. Re-elected in 1932. Lost re-election.	1913–1933 [data missing]
Carroll L. Beedy (Portland)	Republican	March 4, 1921 – January 3, 1935	67th 68th 69th 70th 71st 72nd 73rd	Elected in 1920. Re-elected in 1922. Re-elected in 1924. Re-elected in 1926. Re-elected in 1928. Re-elected in 1930. Re-elected in 1932. Lost re-election.	1933–1943 [data missing]
Simon M. Hamlin (South Portland)	Democratic	January 3, 1935 – January 3, 1937	74th	Elected in 1934. Lost re-election.	1933–1943 [data missing]
James C. Oliver (South Portland)	Republican	January 3, 1937 – January 3, 1943	75th 76th 77th	Elected in 1936. Re-elected in 1938. Re-elected in 1940. Lost renomination.	1933–1943 [data missing]
Robert Hale (Portland)	Republican	January 3, 1943 – January 3, 1959	78th 79th 80th 81st 82nd 83rd 84th 85th	Elected in 1942. Re-elected in 1944. Re-elected in 1946. Re-elected in 1948. Re-elected in 1950. Re-elected in 1952. Re-elected in 1954. Re-elected in 1956. Lost re-election.	1943–1953 [data missing]
Robert Hale (Portland)	Republican	January 3, 1943 – January 3, 1959	78th 79th 80th 81st 82nd 83rd 84th 85th	Elected in 1942. Re-elected in 1944. Re-elected in 1946. Re-elected in 1948. Re-elected in 1950. Re-elected in 1952. Re-elected in 1954. Re-elected in 1956. Lost re-election.	1953–1963 [data missing]
James C. Oliver (South Portland)	Democratic	January 3, 1959 – January 3, 1961	86th	Elected in 1958. Lost re-election.	1953–1963 [data missing]
Peter Garland (Saco)	Republican	January 3, 1961 – January 3, 1963	87th	Elected in 1960. Lost renomination.	1953–1963 [data missing]
Stanley R. Tupper (Boothbay Harbor)	Republican	January 3, 1963 – January 3, 1967	88th 89th	Redistricted from the 2nd district and re-elected in 1962. Re-elected in 1964. Retired.	1963–1973 [data missing]
Peter Kyros (Portland)	Democratic	January 3, 1967 – January 3, 1975	90th 91st 92nd 93rd	Elected in 1966. Re-elected in 1968. Re-elected in 1970. Re-elected in 1972. Lost re-election.	1963–1973 [data missing]
Peter Kyros (Portland)	Democratic	January 3, 1967 – January 3, 1975	90th 91st 92nd 93rd	Elected in 1966. Re-elected in 1968. Re-elected in 1970. Re-elected in 1972. Lost re-election.	1973–1983 [data missing]
David F. Emery (Rockland)	Republican	January 3, 1975 – January 3, 1983	94th 95th 96th 97th	Elected in 1974. Re-elected in 1976. Re-elected in 1978. Re-elected in 1980. Retired to run for U.S. Senator.	1973–1983 [data missing]
John R. McKernan Jr. (Cumberland)	Republican	January 3, 1983 – January 3, 1987	98th 99th	Elected in 1982. Re-elected in 1984. Retired to run for governor.	1983–1993 [data missing]
Joseph E. Brennan (Portland)	Democratic	January 3, 1987 (Note: The service of member-elect Joseph E. Brennan began January 3, 1987 even though he was sworn in January 9, 1987 to finish his term as the outgoing Governor of Maine.) – January 3, 1991	100th 101st	Elected in 1986. Re-elected in 1988. Retired to run for governor.	1983–1993 [data missing]
Thomas Andrews (Portland)	Democratic	January 3, 1991 – January 3, 1995	102nd 103rd	Elected in 1990. Re-elected in 1992. Retired to run for U.S. Senator.	1983–1993 [data missing]
Thomas Andrews (Portland)	Democratic	January 3, 1991 – January 3, 1995	102nd 103rd	Elected in 1990. Re-elected in 1992. Retired to run for U.S. Senator.	1993–2003 [data missing]
James B. Longley Jr. (Falmouth)	Republican	January 3, 1995 – January 3, 1997	104th	Elected in 1994. Lost re-election.	1993–2003 [data missing]
Tom Allen (Portland)	Democratic	January 3, 1997 – January 3, 2009	105th 106th 107th 108th 109th 110th	Elected in 1996. Re-elected in 1998. Re-elected in 2000. Re-elected in 2002. Re-elected in 2004. Re-elected in 2006. Retired to run for U.S. Senator.	1993–2003 [data missing]
Tom Allen (Portland)	Democratic	January 3, 1997 – January 3, 2009	105th 106th 107th 108th 109th 110th	Elected in 1996. Re-elected in 1998. Re-elected in 2000. Re-elected in 2002. Re-elected in 2004. Re-elected in 2006. Retired to run for U.S. Senator.	2003–2013
Chellie Pingree (North Haven)	Democratic	January 3, 2009 – present	111th 112th 113th 114th 115th 116th 117th 118th 119th	Elected in 2008. Re-elected in 2010. Re-elected in 2012. Re-elected in 2014. Re-elected in 2016. Re-elected in 2018. Re-elected in 2020. Re-elected in 2022. Re-elected in 2024. Re-elected in 2026.	2003–2013
Chellie Pingree (North Haven)	Democratic	January 3, 2009 – present	111th 112th 113th 114th 115th 116th 117th 118th 119th	Elected in 2008. Re-elected in 2010. Re-elected in 2012. Re-elected in 2014. Re-elected in 2016. Re-elected in 2018. Re-elected in 2020. Re-elected in 2022. Re-elected in 2024. Re-elected in 2026.	2013–2023
Chellie Pingree (North Haven)	Democratic	January 3, 2009 – present	111th 112th 113th 114th 115th 116th 117th 118th 119th	Elected in 2008. Re-elected in 2010. Re-elected in 2012. Re-elected in 2014. Re-elected in 2016. Re-elected in 2018. Re-elected in 2020. Re-elected in 2022. Re-elected in 2024. Re-elected in 2026.	since 2023

== Election history ==
1986 U.S. House election: Maine District 1
Party	Candidate	Votes	%
Democratic	Joseph E. Brennan	121,848	53.16%
Republican	H. Rollin Ives	100,260	43.74%
Labor for Maine	Plato Truman	7,109	3.10%
Majority		21,588	9.42%
Turnout		229,217	
Democratic gain from Republican			

1988 U.S. House election: Maine District 1
Party	Candidate	Votes	%
Democratic	Joseph E. Brennan (Incumbent)	167,623	60.11%
Republican	Edward S. O'Meara	111,125	36.78%
Majority		79,864	26.44%
Turnout		278,748	
Democratic hold			

1990 U.S. House election: Maine District 1
Party	Candidate	Votes	%
Democratic	Thomas H. Andrews	167,623	60.11%
Republican	David Emery	110,836	39.74%
	write-ins	413	0.15%
Majority		56,787	20.36%
Turnout		278,872	
Democratic hold			

1992 U.S. House election: Maine District 1
Party	Candidate	Votes	%
Democratic	Thomas H. Andrews (Incumbent)	232,696	64.97%
Republican	Linda Bean	125,236	34.97%
	write-ins	216	0.06%
Majority		107,460	30.00%
Turnout		358,148	
Democratic hold			

1994 U.S. House election: Maine District 1
Party	Candidate	Votes	%
Republican	James B. Longley Jr.	136,316	51.88%
Democratic	Dennis L. Dutremble	126,373	48.09%
	write-ins	80	0.03%
Majority		9,943	3.78%
Turnout		262,769	
Republican gain from Democratic			

1996 U.S. House election: Maine District 1
Party	Candidate	Votes	%
Democratic	Thomas H. Allen	173,745	55.30%
Republican	James B. Longley Jr. (Incumbent)	140,354	44.68%
	write-ins	65	0.02%
Majority		33,391	10.63%
Turnout		314,164	
Democratic gain from Republican			

1998 U.S. House election: Maine District 1
Party	Candidate	Votes	%
Democratic	Thomas H. Allen (Incumbent)	134,335	60.33%
Republican	Ross J. Connelly	79,160	35.55%
Constitution	Eric R. Greiner	9,182	4.12%
Majority		55,175	24.78%
Turnout		222,677	
Democratic hold			

2000 U.S. House election: Maine District 1
Party	Candidate	Votes	%
Democratic	Thomas H. Allen (Incumbent)	202,823	59.81%
Republican	Jane A. Amero	123,915	36.54%
Libertarian	J. Frederic Staples	12,356	3.64%
Majority		78,908	23.27%
Turnout		339,094	
Democratic hold			

2002 U.S. House election: Maine District 1
Party	Candidate	Votes	%
Democratic	Tom Allen (Incumbent)	172,646	63.81%
Republican	Steven Joyce	97,931	36.19%
Total votes		270,577	100.00%
Democratic hold			

2004 U.S. House election: Maine District 1
Party	Candidate	Votes	%
Democratic	Tom Allen (Incumbent)	219,077	59.74%
Republican	Charles E. Summers	147,663	40.26%
Total votes		366,740	100.00%
Democratic hold			

2006 U.S. House election: Maine District 1
Party	Candidate	Votes	%
Democratic	Tom Allen (Incumbent)	170,949	60.84%
Republican	Darlene J. Curley	88,009	31.32%
Independent	Dexter Kamilewicz	22,029	7.84%
Total votes		280,987	100.00%
Democratic hold			

2008 U.S. House election: Maine District 1
Party	Candidate	Votes	%
Democratic	Chellie Pingree	205,629	54.90%
Republican	Charles E. Summers	168,930	45.10%
Total votes		374,559	100.00%
Democratic hold			

2010 U.S. House election: Maine District 1
Party	Candidate	Votes	%
Democratic	Chellie Pingree (Incumbent)	169,114	56.82%
Republican	Dean Scontras	128,501	43.17%
No party	Others	42	0.01%
Total votes		297,657	100.00%
Democratic hold			

2012 U.S. House election: Maine District 1
Party	Candidate	Votes	%
Democratic	Chellie Pingree (Incumbent)	236,363	64.8
Republican	Jonathan T. E. Courtney	128,440	35.1%
Total votes		364,803	100.0%
Democratic hold			

2014 U.S. House election: Maine District 1
Party	Candidate	Votes	%
Democratic	Chellie Pingree (Incumbent)	186,674	60.43%
Republican	Isaac J. Misiuk	94,751	30.67%
Independent	Richard P. Murphy	27,410	8.87%
Others		63	0.02%
Total votes		308,898	100%
Democratic hold			

2016 U.S. House election: Maine District 1
Party	Candidate	Votes	%
Democratic	Chellie Pingree (Incumbent)	227,546	57.99%
Republican	Mark Holbrook	164,569	41.94%
Libertarian	James J. Bouchard (Declared Write-In)	276	0.07%
	Blank ballots	14,551	N/A
Total votes		406,942	100%
Democratic hold			

The 2018 election was the first to use ranked-choice voting as opposed to plurality voting since the district's creation. However, since the leading candidate had a majority of first-choice votes, no distribution of preferences was conducted.

2018 U.S. House election: Maine District 1 (RCV)
Party	Candidate	Votes	%
Democratic	Chellie Pingree (Incumbent)	201,195	58.8%
Republican	Mark Holbrook	111,188	32.5%
Independent	Marty Grohman	29,670	8.7%
Total votes		342,053	100%
Democratic hold			

2020 U.S. House election: Maine District 1
Party	Candidate	Votes	%
Democratic	Chellie Pingree (Incumbent)	271,004	62.2%
Republican	Jay Allen	165,008	37.8%
Write-in		15	0.0%
Total votes		436,027	100%
Democratic hold			

2022 U.S. House election: Maine District 1
Party	Candidate	Votes	%
Democratic	Chellie Pingree (incumbent)	218,630	62.8
Republican	Ed Thelander	128,996	37.1
Write-in		362	0.1
Total votes		347,988	100
Democratic hold			

2024 U.S. House election: Maine District 1
Party	Candidate	Votes	%
Democratic	Chellie Pingree (incumbent)	249,798	58.70
Republican	Ronald Russell	154,849	36.39
Independent	Ethan Alcorn	20,883	4.91
Total votes		425,530	100.00

== See also ==
- Maine's congressional districts
- List of United States congressional districts

== Bibliography ==
- Martis, Kenneth C. (1989). The Historical Atlas of Political Parties in the United States Congress. New York: Macmillan Publishing Company.
- Martis, Kenneth C. (1982). The Historical Atlas of United States Congressional Districts. New York: Macmillan Publishing Company.
- Congressional Biographical Directory of the United States 1774–present

U.S. House of Representatives
Preceded by Kentucky's 6th congressional district	Home district of the speaker of the House; December 4, 1889 – March 3, 1891	Succeeded by Georgia's 3rd congressional district
Preceded by Georgia's 3rd congressional district	Home district of the speaker of the House; December 2, 1895 – March 3, 1899	Succeeded by Iowa's 3rd congressional district
