= Armand G. Sansoucy =

American politician (1910–1983)

Armand G. Sansoucy (January 7, 1910 – August 28, 1983) was an American politician (a Democrat) who held several positions including State Auditor for the State of Maine (1965–1969) and mayor of Lewiston, Maine (1949–1950).

== See also ==
- List of mayors of Lewiston, Maine
