= Maine State Treasurer =

U.S. state government position

- Flag of the State of Maine
- Incumbent; Joseph Perry since January 9, 2025
- Style: Mr. Treasurer (informal); The Honorable (formal)
- Seat: Burton M. Cross Building; Augusta, Maine
- Appointer: State legislature
- Term length: 2 years
- Inaugural holder: Joseph C. Boyd
- Formation: March 15, 1820
- Deputy: Deputy Treasurer
- Salary: $109,325
- Website: www.maine.gov/treasurer

The Maine State Treasurer is a constitutional officer of the U.S. state of Maine.

The office is authorized by Article V, Part Third of the Maine Constitution. The Treasurer is chosen by the Maine Legislature in joint session for a two-year term; the officeholder can serve no more than four consecutive terms. Responsibilities of the Treasurer's Office include providing financial services for all state agencies, issuing bonds and managing the State's debt, as well as holding unclaimed property and working to return it to its rightful owners. The Treasurer is also an ex officio member of several state boards and agencies.

Governor Paul LePage proposed in 2015 to change the selection process to a gubernatorial appointment that would be confirmed by the Legislature. In 2023, state Republicans called for the State Treasurer to be elected by popular vote. Neither change passed and the State Treasurer continues to be selected by the Legislature.

== List of State Treasurers ==
Tenure	Image	State Treasurer	Party	Hometown	Notes
1820–1822		Joseph C. Boyd		Portland	
1823–1827		Elias Thomas		Portland	
1828		Mark Harris	Democratic-Republican	Portland	U.S. Representative for Maine's 2nd congressional district (1822–1823)
1829–1830		Elias Thomas		Portland	
1831		A. B. Thompson		Brunswick	
1832–1834		Mark Harris	Democratic-Republican	Portland	U.S. Representative for Maine's 2nd congressional district (1822–1823)
1835–1837		Asa Redington, Jr.		Augusta	
1838		James B. Cahoon	Whig (later Democratic)	Portland	
1839		Jeremiah Goodwin	Democratic	Alfred	
1840		Daniel Williams		Augusta	
1841		Sanford Kingsbury		Kingsbury Plantation	
1842–1846		James White	Democratic	Belfast	
1847–1849		Moses Macdonald	Democratic	Limerick	
1850–1854		Samuel Cony	Republican	Augusta	
1855		Woodbury Davis	Republican	Belfast	
1856		Isaac Reed	Democratic	Waldoboro	
1857–1859		Benjamin D. Peck		Portland	
1860–1864		Nathan Dame		Alfred	
1865–1868		Nathan Griffin Hichborn	Republican	Stockton Springs	
1869–1873		William Caldwell	Republican	Augusta	
1874–1876		Silas C. Hatch	Republican	Bangor	
1877–1878		Esreff H. Banks	Republican	Biddeford	
1879		Charles White	Democratic	Gardiner	
1880–1884		Samual A. Holbrook	Republican	Augusta	
1885–1887		Edwin C. Burleigh	Republican	Bangor	42nd Governor of Maine (1889–1893); U.S. Representative for Maine's 3rd congressional district (1897–1911); U.S. Senator from Maine (1913–1916)
1888–1894		George L. Beal	Republican	Norway	Union Army General
1895–1900		F. Marion Simpson	Republican	Carmel	
1901–1906		Ormandal Smith	Republican	Litchfield	
1907–1910		Pascal P. Gilmore	Republican	Bucksport	
1911–1912		James F. Singleton	Democratic	Bangor	
1913–1914		Joseph W. Simpson	Republican	York	
1915–1916		Elmer E. Newbert	Democratic	Augusta	
1917–1920		Joseph W. Simpson	Republican	York	
1921–1926		William L. Bonney	Republican	Bowdoinham	
1927–1931		William S. Owen	Republican	Milo	
1932		Louis H. Winship	Republican	Augusta	Filled the remainder of William S. Owen's term following his resignation
1933–1936		George S. Foster	Republican	Ellsworth	Died in office
1936		Louis H. Winship	Republican	Augusta	Filled the remainder of Foster's term
1937–1942		Belmont A. Smith	Republican	Bangor	
1943–1946		Joseph H. McGillicuddy	Republican	Houlton	
1947–1964		Frank S. Carpenter	Republican	Augusta	
1965–1966		Eben L. Elwell	Democratic	Augusta	
1967–1968		Michael A. Napolitano	Republican	Augusta	
1969–1974		Norman K. Ferguson	Republican	Hanover	
1975–1976		Rodney L. Scribner	Democratic	Augusta	
1977–1978		H. Leighton Cooney, Jr.	Democratic	Augusta	
1979–1980		Jerrold Speers	Republican	Winthrop	
1981–1996		Samuel Shapiro	Democratic	Waterville	
1997–2004		Dale McCormick	Democratic	Monmouth	
2005–2010		David Lemoine	Democratic	Saco	
2011–2012		Bruce Poliquin	Republican	Georgetown	U.S. Representative for Maine's 2nd congressional district (2015–2019)
2013–2015		Neria Douglass	Democratic	Auburn	
2015–2019		Terry Hayes	Independent	Buckfield	
2019–2025		Henry Beck	Democratic	Watervile	
2025–present		Joe Perry	Democratic	Bangor	

== References and external links ==
- List of Maine State Treasurers
- Official Maine State Treasurer site
- Constitution of Maine
