= 1860 Maine gubernatorial election =

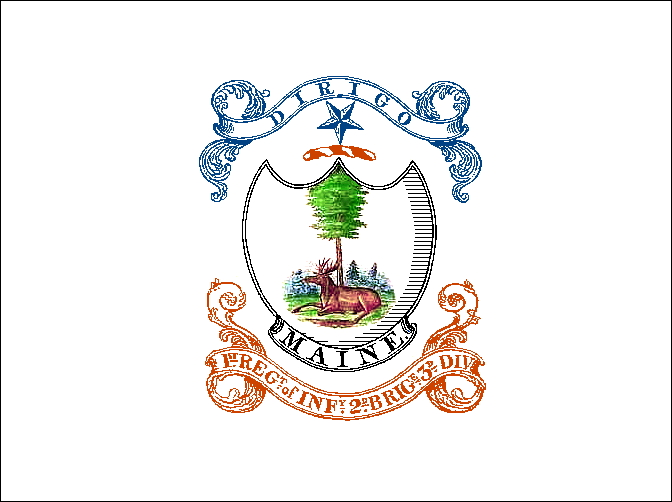
- September 10, 1860
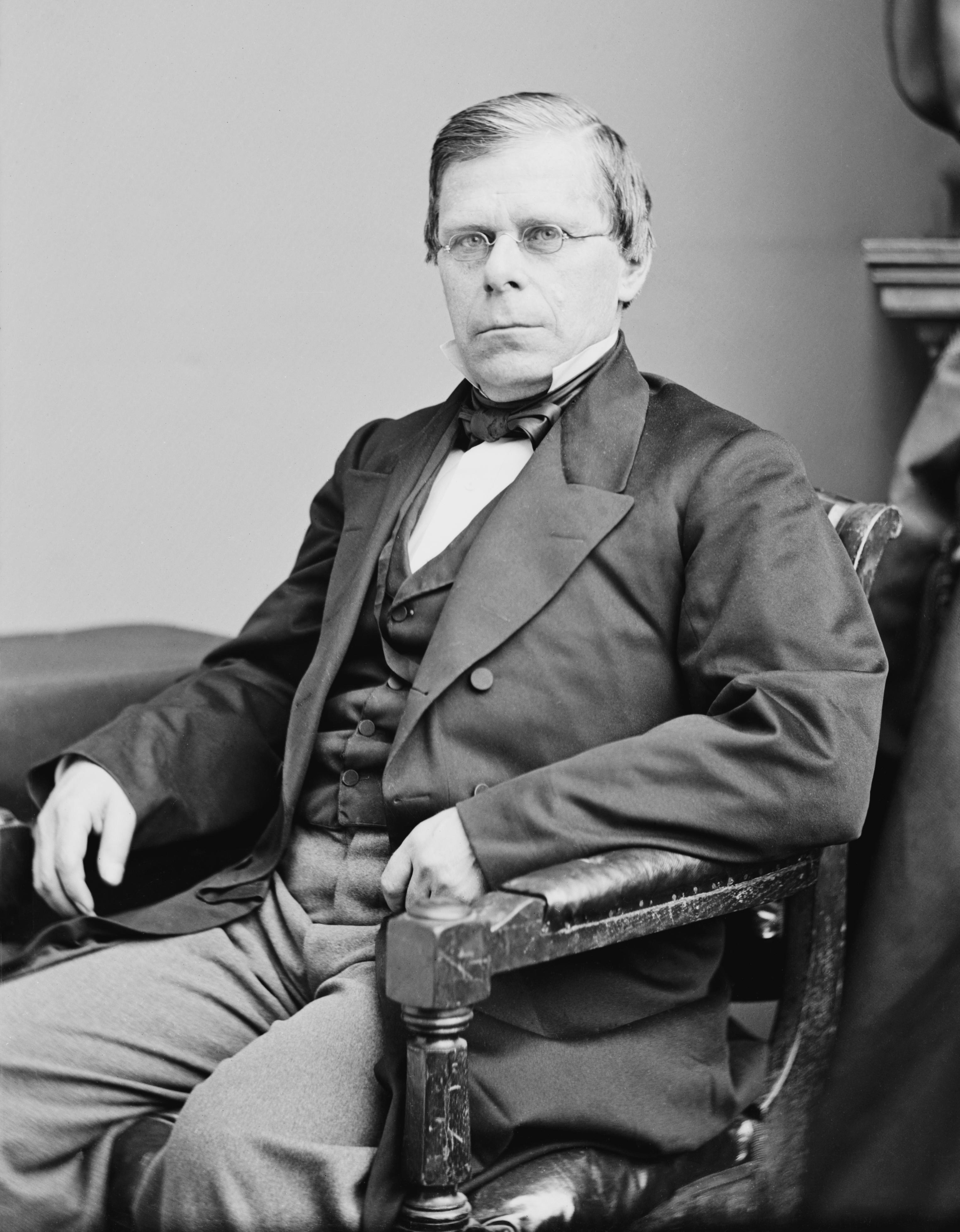

| Nominee | Israel Washburn Jr. | Ephraim K. Smart |
| Party | Republican | Democratic |
| Popular vote | 69,843 | 51,878 |
| Percentage | 56.56% | 42.02% |
- County results Washburn: 50–60% 60–70% Smart: 50–60%
Governor before election
Lot M. Morrill
Republican
Elected Governor
Israel Washburn Jr.
Republican

The 1860 Maine gubernatorial election was held on September 10, 1860, in order to elect the Governor of Maine. Republican nominee and incumbent member of the U.S. House of Representatives from Maine's 5th district Israel Washburn Jr. defeated Democratic nominee and former member of the Maine House of Representatives Ephraim K. Smart and Constitutional Union nominee and former member of the Maine House of Representatives Phinehas Barnes.

== General election ==
On election day, September 10, 1860, Republican nominee Israel Washburn Jr. won the election by a margin of 17,965 votes against his foremost opponent Democratic nominee Ephraim K. Smart, thereby retaining Republican control over the office of governor. Washburn was sworn in as the 29th Governor of Maine on January 2, 1861.

=== Results ===
Maine gubernatorial election, 1860
| Party | Candidate | Votes | % |
|---|---|---|---|
| Republican | Israel Washburn Jr. | 69,843 | 56.56 |
| Democratic | Ephraim K. Smart | 51,878 | 42.02 |
| Constitutional Union | Phinehas Barnes | 1,726 | 1.40 |
| | Scattering | 29 | 0.02 |
| Total votes | | 123,476 | 100.00 |
| Republican hold | | | |
