= Abel C. Martin =

American architect

Abel Camp Martin
- Born: October 26, 1831; Stowe, Vermont, US
- Died: October 29, 1879; Boston, Massachusetts, US
- Occupation: Architect
- Practice: Martin & Thayer; A. C. Martin

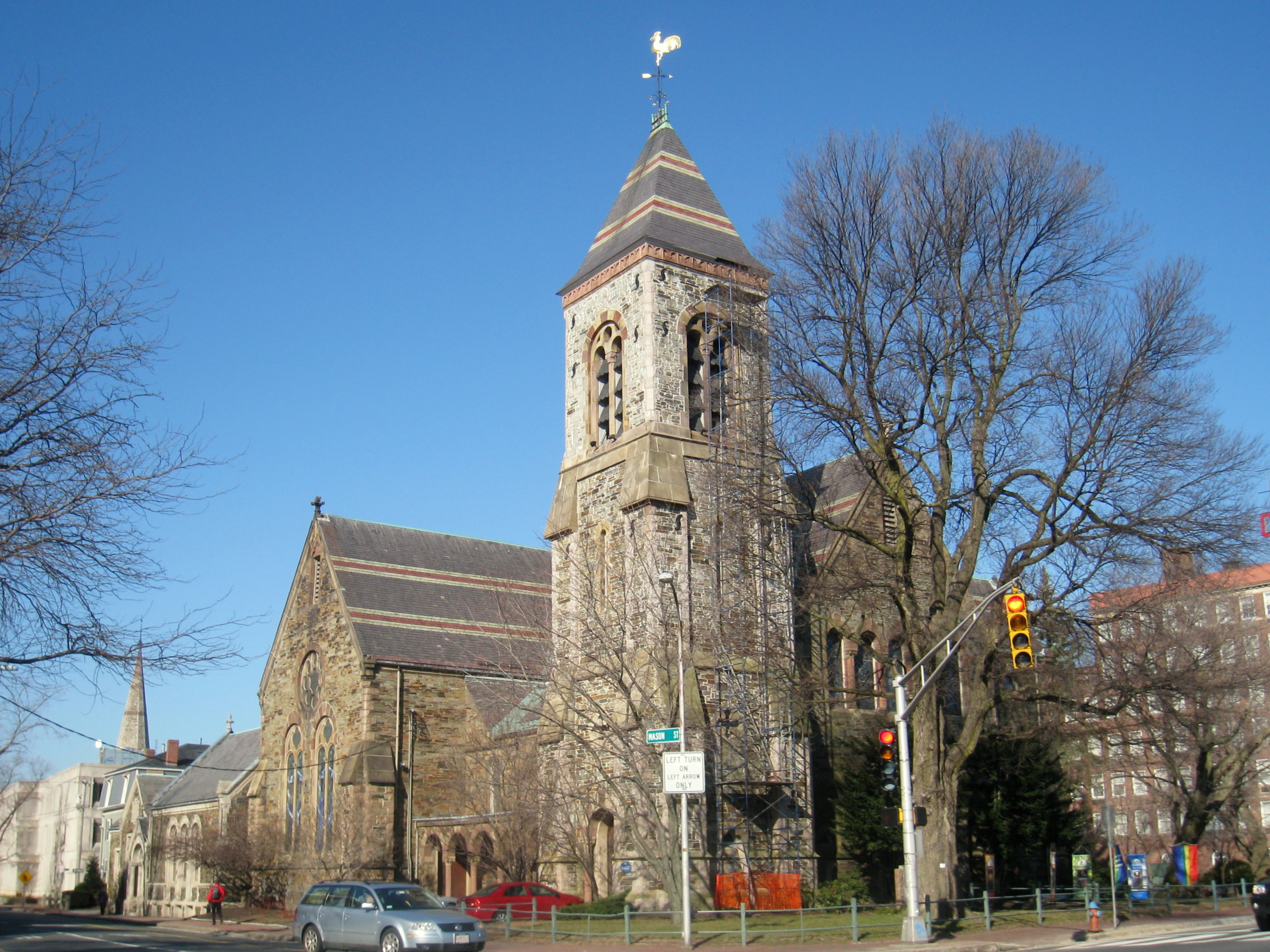
First Church in Cambridge, Cambridge, 1870.

Abel C. Martin (1831–1879), often referred to as A. C. Martin, was an American architect who worked in Boston, Massachusetts, during the nineteenth century.

== Early life and career ==
Martin was born October 26, 1831, in Stowe, Vermont, to Christopher W. and Laura (Camp) Martin. In early life, at the insistence of his father, he learned a trade, but finding the work not to his liking, and chose to study engineering instead. In 1854 he enrolled in the Lawrence Scientific School of Harvard University, graduating in 1856 with the degree of B. S. He then entered the office of Arthur Gilman, a successful Boston architect who was then engaged on the designing of the Back Bay. His engagement on this project left little time for the instruction of the young men in his office, so Martin had to learn quickly. In 1859, he left Gilman to begin his own practice.

He worked alone until 1865, when he formed a partnership with another young architect, Samuel J. F. Thayer. This partnership continued until 1869, though Martin spent much of the year 1867-1868 traveling abroad in Europe. In 1869 both Martin and Thayer returned to private practice.

Martin was, in 1867, one of the founding members of the Boston Society of Architects, and was its first secretary. Martin led the BSA's efforts to regulate building construction in Boston, and in 1870 some of these were passed. In the aftermath of the Great Boston Fire of 1872, Martin was among those questioned as part of an official inquiry by the City of Boston. The reasons he gave for the fire's swift spread were that the practice of supporting wooden floor beams in masonry wall cavities allowed the wood to catch fire as the walls became superheated, and that elaborate wooden mansard roofs presented an easy way for the fire to spread extremely quickly. Furthermore, Martin argued that the unwillingness of the building public to follow building regulations contributed to the spread.

Martin was highly interested in the ventilation of buildings, and wrote extensively on the subject. This led to him being commissioned, in 1872, to design the Brighton Abattoir, the first regulated slaughterhouse in the United States. He also devised a new system of ventilation used in his Park Theatre, opened in 1879, though his death meant he could not apply this system elsewhere.

Martin would continue his practice until his death in 1879. He died on October 29, 1879, several days after being run over by a frightened horse. At the time of his death, he was forty-eight years old.

== Personal life ==
In 1864 Martin married Clara Barnes of Portland, Maine, the daughter of Phinehas Barnes. They had only one child, a daughter born in 1865, who died at the age of two.

Clara Martin was a proponent of women's education, and from the 1870s until her death in 1886 she was principal of the Otis Place School, a girl's preparatory school.

== Legacy ==
Like Gilman, Martin took on students who aimed to practice architecture. Of these, the most prominent would be Henry F. Starbuck, who was in his office from 1867 to 1872. Additionally, in 1874 Robert Gould Shaw (a cousin of the Civil War officer of the same name) was in his office, though he soon left to join his brother's architectural practice, G. R. & R. G. Shaw.

Martin's First Church in Cambridge is one of his largest surviving works, and has been cited for its quality by writers such as Henry-Russell Hitchcock in his study of H. H. Richardson and his influences, and by Keith N. Morgan in his survey of the architecture of metropolitan Boston.

== Architectural works ==
Year	Project	Address	City	State	Notes	Image	Reference
1860	Houses for Peleg W. Chandler and others	149-159 Beacon St	Boston	Massachusetts	A contributing property to the Back Bay Historic District, listed on the National Register of Historic Places in 1973.		
1860	House for John L. Gardner Sr.	303 Berkeley St	Boston	Massachusetts	A contributing property to the Back Bay Historic District, listed on the National Register of Historic Places in 1973.		
1860	House for Barnabas T. Loring	150 Beacon St	Boston	Massachusetts	Demolished in 1904.		
1865	Centenary Methodist Church (Note: Designed by the partnership of Martin & Thayer.)	170 Commercial St	Provincetown	Massachusetts	Burned in 1908.		
1865	Clarendon Hotel	523 Tremont St	Boston	Massachusetts	Demolished.		
1866	Centenary United Church	479 Rue Dufferin	Stanstead	Quebec			
1866	Wesleyan Methodist Church of Wilbraham	Main St and Mountain Rd	Wilbraham	Massachusetts	Now used by the Wilbraham & Monson Academy.		
1867	First Baptist Church of Webster	39 E Main St	Webster	Massachusetts			
1867	Forster School	Sycamore St	Somerville	Massachusetts	Demolished.		
1867	South Baptist Church	423 W Broadway	South Boston, Boston	Massachusetts	Demolished.		
1867	Trinity Methodist Church (former)	60 Green St	Charlestown, Boston	Massachusetts	Extant but heavily altered.		
1868	Bowditch School	35 Flint St	Salem	Massachusetts			
1868	Clarendon Street Baptist Church	2 Clarendon St	Boston	Massachusetts	Extant but heavily altered.		
1868	Trinity Methodist Church	Bridge St	Springfield	Massachusetts	Demolished in 1922.		
1869	Trinity Methodist Church	250 Cambridge St	Cambridge	Massachusetts	Demolished.		
1870	First Church in Cambridge, Congregational	11 Garden St	Cambridge	Massachusetts			
1871	Houses for Samuel Eliot	156-160 Mount Vernon St	Boston	Massachusetts	A contributing property to the Beacon Hill Historic District, listed on the National Register of Historic Places in 1966.		
1872	Brighton Abattoir	Market St	Brighton, Boston	Massachusetts	Destroyed by fire in 1910.		
1872	Houses for Abel C. Martin	3-4 Otis Pl	Boston	Massachusetts	Abel C. and Clara Martin lived at 4 Otis Place. A contributing property to the Beacon Hill Historic District, listed on the National Register of Historic Places in 1966.		
1872	House for George B. Upton Jr.	19 Marlborough St	Boston	Massachusetts	A contributing property to the Back Bay Historic District, listed on the National Register of Historic Places in 1973.		
1872	Remodeling of Massachusetts Hall, Bowdoin College	255 Maine St	Brunswick	Maine	Martin gutted the building's upper two floors to make way for the Cleaveland Cabinet, a museum of natural history dedicated to Parker Cleaveland. This was funded by Cleaveland's son-in-law Peleg W. Chandler, an existing client of Martin's. The work was reversed in 1937 and the building was listed on the National Register of Historic Places in 1971.		
1872	Otis Place School	5 Otis Pl	Boston	Massachusetts	This was the home of Clara Martin's school for girls. A contributing property to the Beacon Hill Historic District, listed on the National Register of Historic Places in 1966.		
1873	Chauncy Hall School (former)	585 Boylston St	Boston	Massachusetts	Demolished.		
1873	Engine House No. 29	20 Chestnut Hill Ave	Brighton, Boston	Massachusetts	Altered.		
1874	First Reformed Presbyterian Church	131 Arlington St	Boston	Massachusetts	Demolished.		
1874	Houses for Samuel Eliot	6-7-8 Otis Pl	Boston	Massachusetts	A contributing property to the Beacon Hill Historic District, listed on the National Register of Historic Places in 1966.		
1875	Mercantile building	85 Purchase St	Boston	Massachusetts	Demolished.		
1877	Mercantile building for Henry Guild	67 Batterymarch St	Boston	Massachusetts			
1877	Remodeling of St. John Episcopal Church	27 Devens St	Charlestown, Boston	Massachusetts	Originally designed by Richard Bond in 1841.		
1878	Mercantile building for Henry G. Dorr	281 Franklin St	Boston	Massachusetts			
1879	House for George D. Noyes	287 Walnut St	Brookline	Massachusetts			
1879	Park Theatre	617 Washington St	Boston	Massachusetts	Later remodeled by Clarence H. Blackall as a movie theatre. Demolished in 1990.		
