= Sophie May =

Sophie May may refer to:

- Rebecca Sophia Clarke, author known as Sophie May
- Sophie May (singer), British-Australian singer-songwriter
- Sophie May Williams, The Voice UK contestant

== See also ==
- Sophie May House
