= Cornelius Holland =

Cornelius Holland may refer to:

- Cornelius Holland (regicide) (1599–c. 1671), regicide of Charles I of England
- Cornelius Holland (politician) (1783–1870), United States Representative from Maine
