= Sophie May House =

Historic house in Maine, United States

- U.S. National Register of Historic Places
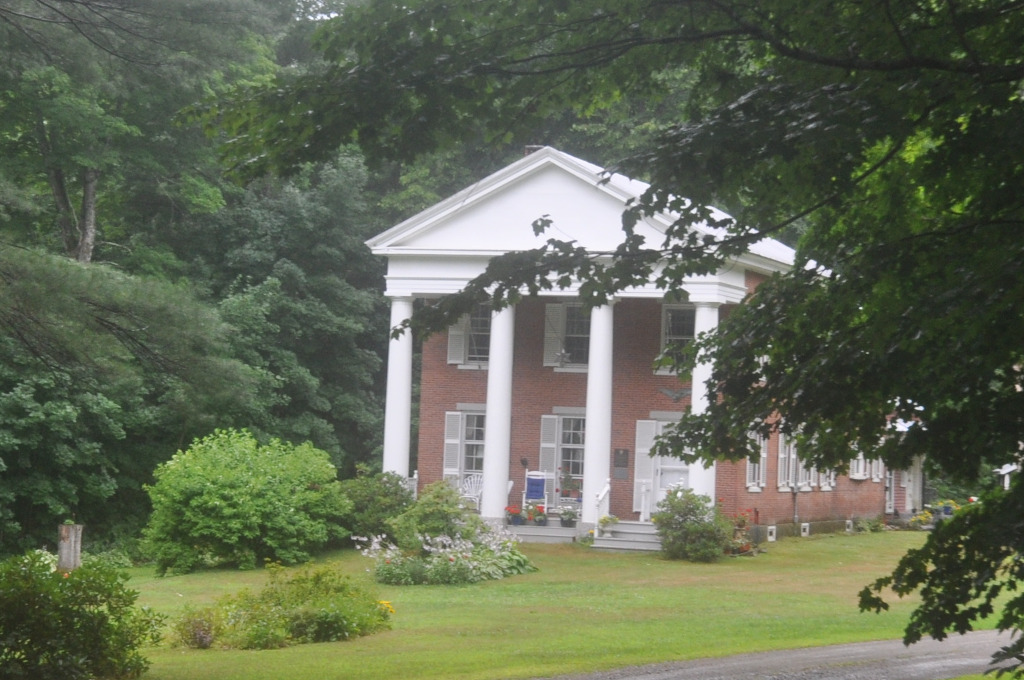
- 2022 photo

- Location within Maine Location within the United States
- Location: Sophie May Lane, Norridgewock, Maine
- Coordinates: 44°43′4″N 69°48′3″W
- Area: 1 acre (0.40 ha)
- Built: 1845
- Architect: Cullen Sawtelle
- Architectural style: Greek Revival
- NRHP reference No.: 76000114
- Added to NRHP: October 8, 1976

The Sophie May House is a historic house at 22 Sophie May Lane in Norridgewock, Maine. Built in 1845, it is an excellent local example of Greek Revival architecture, with a classical four-columned Greek temple front. The house is most notable as the long-time home of Rebecca Sophia Clarke (1833-1906), who wrote a series of popular children's books under the pen name "Sophie May". The house was listed on the National Register of Historic Places in 1976.

== Description and setting ==
The Sophie May House is set between Sophie May Lane and the Kennebec River to the south, just outside the main village of Norridgewock. It is a 2 1/2-story brick structure, with a front-facing gable roof, which projects beyond the front facade and is supported by four smooth Doric columns, with a fully pedimented flush-boarded gable end above. The main facade is three bays wide, with full-length windows in the two left bays and the entrance in the rightmost. The interior follows a typical side-hall plan, with the main parlor to the left, and kitchen and service area in ells attached to the rear of the house.

The house was built in 1845 by Cullen Sawtelle, a native son who studied law at Bowdoin College and represented the area in Congress in the 1840s. In 1848 Sawtelle sold the house to Asa Clarke. Clarke's daughter, Rebecca, was educated at Norridgewock Female Academy and taught primary school in Illinois until advancing deafness forced her return. From 1861 until her death in 1906 she lived here, where she wrote more than forty volumes of children's stories, using realistic settings and characterizations drawn in part from her hometown, and in contrast to the prevailing style of didactic and moralizing children's literature.

Rebecca's sister Sarah Jones Clarke, who was also a well-known author under the name Penn Shirley, lived in the house until her death in 1929.

== See also ==
- National Register of Historic Places listings in Somerset County, Maine
