= Charles G. Sawtelle =

U.S. Army brigadier general

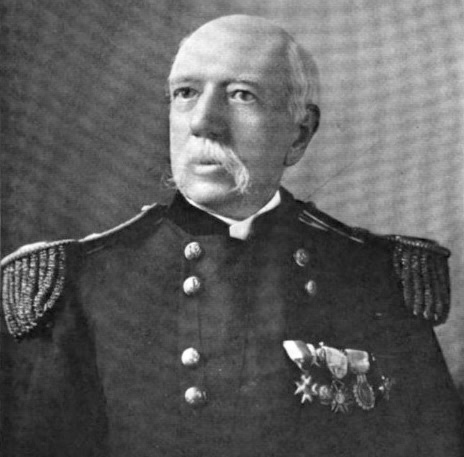
- Sawtelle in a 1913 publication
- Born: May 10, 1834; Norridgewock, Maine, U.S.
- Died: January 4, 1913 (aged 78); Washington, D.C.
- Burial place: Arlington National Cemetery
- Education: Phillips Academy; United States Military Academy
- Spouse: Alice Chester Munroe (m. 1869–1913, his death)
- Children: 3
- Relatives: Cullen Sawtelle (Father); Abner Ellis (Great-great-grandfather)
- Military career
- Allegiance: United States; Union
- Service: United States Army; Union Army
- Service years: 1854–1897
- Rank: Brigadier General
- Unit: U.S. Army Quartermaster Corps
- Commands: Perryville, Maryland Quartermaster Depot; Acting Chief Quartermaster, Army of the Potomac; Chief Quartermaster, II Corps; Chief Quartermaster, Right Grand Division; Chief Quartermaster, Cavalry Corps, Army of the Potomac; Chief Quartermaster, Union Army Cavalry Bureau; Chief Quartermaster, Brownsville, Texas; Chief Quartermaster, Military Division of West Mississippi; Chief Quartermaster, Military Division of the Southwest; Chief Quartermaster, Military Division of the Gulf; Chief Quartermaster, Department of the Gulf; Chief Quartermaster, Fifth Military District; Chief Quartermaster, Department of California; Chief Quartermaster, Third Quartermaster's District, Department of the East; Chief Quartermaster, Third District, Division of the Atlantic; Chief Quartermaster, First District, Division of the Atlantic; New York City Quartermaster Depot; Chief Quartermaster, Department of the East; Chief Quartermaster, Department of the Columbia; Chief Quartermaster, Department of the South; Chief Quartermaster, Division of the Atlantic; Philadelphia Quartermaster Depot; Quartermaster General of the United States Army
- Wars: American Indian Wars; American Civil War

Charles G. Sawtelle (May 10, 1834 – January 4, 1913) was a career officer in the United States Army. A veteran of the American Indian Wars and the American Civil War, he served from 1854 to 1897 and attained the rank of brigadier general while serving as Quartermaster General of the United States Army.

A native of Norridgewock, Maine and the son of attorney and politician Cullen Sawtelle, Sawtelle was an 1854 graduate of the United States Military Academy at West Point, and received his commission as a second lieutenant of Infantry. Assigned to the 6th Infantry Regiment, he initially served in the western United States during the American Indian Wars, including postings to Fort Laramie and Fort Pierre Chouteau in Dakota Territory and Fort Leavenworth, Kansas. He was promoted to first lieutenant in 1860.

After duty in California, Sawtelle served in Union Army chief quartermaster postings throughout the American Civil War, and was assigned to units and depots in Virginia, Maryland, Washington, D.C., Texas, and Louisiana. During the war, he was promoted to captain in the regular army, and lieutenant colonel of and colonel of the United States Volunteers. After the war, he received brevet promotions to major, lieutenant colonel, colonel, and brigadier general in recognition of the superior service he rendered throughout the war.

After the Civil War, Sawtelle was promoted to permanent major and continued to serve as chief quartermaster of depots, districts, and divisions. He was promoted to lieutenant colonel in 1881 and colonel in 1894. After serving as commander of the Philadelphia Quartermaster Depot from 1890 to 1894, and assistant quartermaster general beginning in 1894, in August 1896 Sawtelle was selected to serve as Quartermaster General of the United States Army; he received promotion to brigadier general and served until retiring in February 1897. In retirement, Sawtelle was a resident of Washington, D.C. He died in Washington, D.C., on January 4, 1913, and was buried at Arlington National Cemetery.

== Early life ==
Charles Greene Sawtelle was born in Norridgewock, Maine on May 10, 1834, the son of Elizabeth (Lyman) Sawtelle and Cullen Sawtelle, an attorney and politician who represented Maine's 5th congressional district in the United States House of Representatives from 1845 to 1847 and 1849 to 1851. He was educated at Mount Pleasant Institute in Amherst, Massachusetts and Phillips Academy in Andover, Massachusetts.

In 1850, Sawtelle began attendance at the United States Military Academy. He graduated in July 1854, ranked 38th of 46, and received his commission as a second lieutenant by brevet in the Infantry Branch. He received his second lieutenant's commission in March 1855.

== Start of career ==
=== American Indian Wars ===
Initially assigned to the 6th Infantry Regiment, Sawtelle took part in the American Indian Wars, including postings at Fort Ripley, Minnesota (1854–1855); Fort Laramie, Dakota Territory (1855–1856); Fort Pierre Chouteau, Dakota Territory (1856); Fort Leavenworth, Kansas (1856–1857); Benicia Arsenal, California (1858); the Presidio of San Francisco (1858–1860); and a second tour at Benicia Arsenal (1860–1861). During his initial service, Sawtelle took part in several American Indian Wars expeditions, including: Kansas (1857–1858); Utah (1858); and California (1859). He received promotion to first lieutenant in June 1860.

=== American Civil War ===
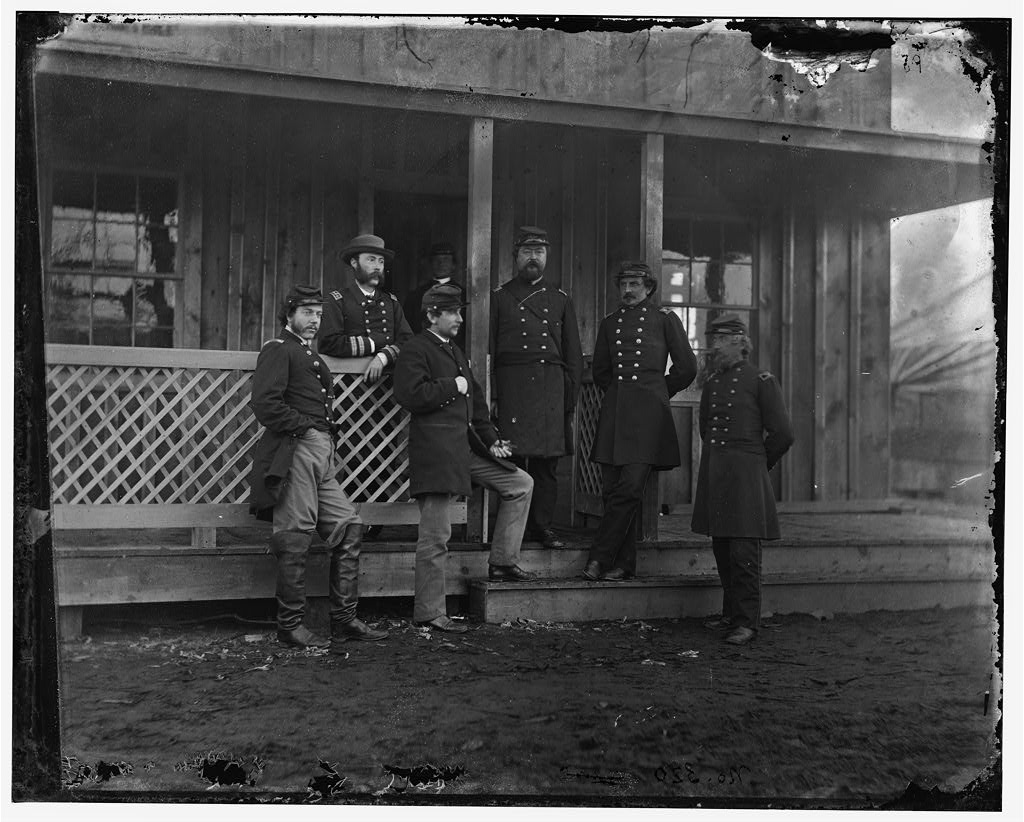
Aquia Creek Landing, Virginia, February 1863. Sawtelle is second from left.

Sawtelle served in the Union Army during the American Civil War; having begun specializing in quartermaster duties early in his career, he continued in this career field during the war. He commanded the Quartermaster Depot in Perryville, Maryland from May 1861 to March 1862, and he was promoted to captain in May 1861. During the Peninsula Campaign, he supervised the Army of the Potomac's disembarkation and movement of supplies from: Fort Monroe, Virginia (March to May, 1862); White House, Virginia (May to June, 1862); and Harrison's Landing, Virginia (July to August 1862). At the end of the campaign, Sawtelle superintended the Army of the Potomac's embarkation at Fort Monroe, Newport News, Hampton and Yorktown (August to September 1862) and transport back to the Washington, D.C. area.

From September to November 1862, Sawtelle was acting chief quartermaster of the Army of the Potomac, and supervised the transport of supplies from Washington, D.C., to the front lines during the Maryland campaign, and he was promoted to lieutenant colonel of United States Volunteers on November 12, 1862. He served as chief quartermaster of II Corps during the Rappahannock Campaign, and he was chief quartermaster of the Right Grand Division during the Battle of Fredericksburg in December 1862. He was chief quartermaster of the Army of the Potomac's Cavalry Corps from January to June 13, 1863, including participation in Stoneman's 1863 raid. In June 1863, he oversaw the removal of supplies from Aquia Creek, Virginia and subsequent relocation to Alexandria, Virginia. Sawtelle was assistant chief quartermaster of the Army of the Potomac from June to August 1863, and supervised the transport of supplies from Washington, D.C to Alexandria for shipment north during the Gettysburg campaign. From August 1863 to February 1864, Sawtelle served as chief quartermaster of the Union Army's Cavalry Bureau in Washington, D.C. In February 1864, he was reduced to his permanent rank of captain.

Sawtelle served as chief quartermaster of Union forces in Brownsville, Texas from February to April 1864. In May and June 1864, he supervised troop and supply transports during the relief of troops commanded by Nathaniel P. Banks at the end of the Red River campaign. In May, he was promoted to lieutenant colonel of Volunteers for the second time. Sawtelle was assigned as chief quartermaster of the Military Division of West Mississippi from June 1864 to June 1865. In June and July 1865, he served as chief quartermaster of the Military Division of the Southwest. In May 1865, he was promoted to colonel of Volunteers. At the end of the war, Sawtelle received brevet promotions to major, lieutenant colonel, colonel, and brigadier general to recognize the superior service he rendered throughout the war.

== Continued career ==
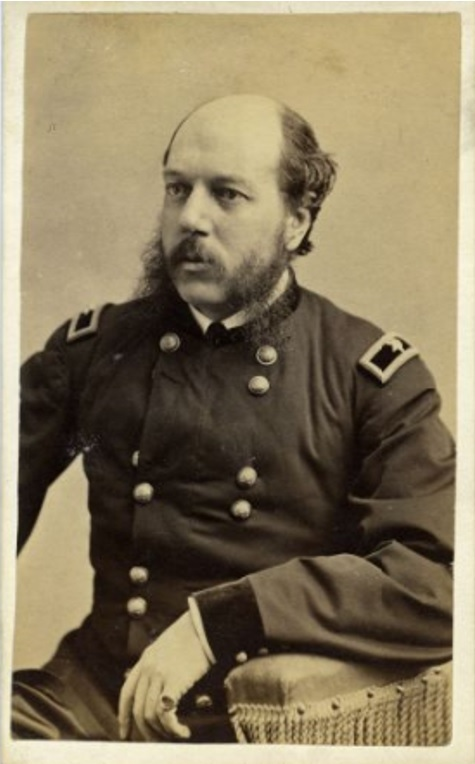
Sawtelle as a brevet brigadier general in February 1869

Sawtelle was chief quartermaster of the Military Division of the Gulf from July 1865 to August 1866. From August 1866 to April 1867, he was chief quartermaster for the Department of the Gulf. On January 1, 1867, he was reduced in rank from colonel of Volunteers to his permanent rank of captain, and he was promoted to major on January 18.

From April to August 1867, Sawtelle was chief quartermaster of the Fifth Military District. He was in charge of the Clothing department and assistant to the chief quartermaster of the New York City quartermaster depot from September 1867 to April 1869. From May 1869 to August 1872, he served as chief quartermaster of the Department of California. He was chief quartermaster for the Third Quartermaster District, Department of the East from August 1872 to October 1873, and he held the same position with the Third District, Division of the Atlantic from November 1873 to July 1874. From July 1874 to October 1876, he served as chief quartermaster for the Division of the Atlantic's First District. He was chief quartermaster of the New York City Quartermaster Depot from October 1876 to November 1877, and chief quartermaster for the Department of the East from November 1877 to March 1878. Sawtelle was chief quartermaster of the Department of the Columbia from May 1878 to April 1881, and he was promoted to lieutenant colonel in January 1881.

== Later career ==
Sawtelle was chief quartermaster for the Department of the South from April 1881 to April 1882. From May 1882 to October 1883, he served as chief quartermaster for the Division of the Atlantic and Department of the East. He served on the staff of the Quartermaster General in Washington, D.C., from October 1883 to September 1890. He commanded the Philadelphia Quartermaster Depot from October 1890 to August 1894. Sawtelle was promoted to colonel in September 1894, and from September 1894 to August 1896, he served as Assistant Quartermaster General.

In August 1896, Sawtelle was promoted to brigadier general and assigned as Quartermaster General. He served until requesting retirement in February 1897.

== Retirement and death ==
In retirement, Sawtelle was a resident of Washington, D.C. He died in Washington, D.C., on January 4, 1913. His funeral took place at St. John's Episcopal Church in Washington, D.C. He was buried at Arlington National Cemetery.

Sawtelle was a member of the Grand Army of the Republic, Military Order of the Loyal Legion of the United States, and Society of the Army of the Potomac. Through his descent from great-great-grandfather Abner Ellis, Sawtelle was a member of the Sons of the Revolution.

== Family ==
On March 30, 1869, Sawtelle married Alice Chester Munroe (1847–1932) in Englewood, New Jersey. They were the parents of three children, Charles, Edmund, and Alice.
