= Moses Mason Jr. =

American politician (1789–1866)

Member of the U.S. House of Representatives from Maine's 5th district
- In office March 4, 1833 – March 3, 1837
- Preceded by: Cornelius Holland
- Succeeded by: Timothy J. Carter

Personal details
- Born: June 2, 1789 Dublin, New Hampshire, U.S.
- Died: June 25, 1866 (aged 77) Bethel, Maine
- Party: Jacksonian

Moses Mason Jr. (1789–1866) was a U.S. representative from Maine.

Born in Dublin, New Hampshire, Mason moved with his parents to Bethel, Maine, in 1799. He attended the common schools, then studied medicine and commenced practice in Bethel in 1813. He was appointed first postmaster of Bethel April 1, 1815, serving until December 27, 1833. He was a Justice of the Peace 1821–1866, and county commissioner 1831–1834.

Mason was elected as a Jacksonian to the twenty-third and twenty-fourth congresses (March 4, 1833 – March 3, 1837). He was an executive councilor 1843–1845, trustee of the state insane hospital in 1844, and selectman of Bethel for fourteen years. He served as president of Gould Academy 1854–1856.

He died in Bethel, Maine, June 25, 1866 and was interred in Woodlawn Cemetery.
