= Timothy J. Carter =

American politician (1800–1838)

Member of the U.S. House of Representatives from Maine's 5th district
- In office March 4, 1837 – March 14, 1838
- Preceded by: Moses Mason Jr.
- Succeeded by: Virgil D. Parris

Personal details
- Born: Timothy Jarvis Carter; August 18, 1800 Bethel, Massachusetts, U.S.
- Died: March 14, 1838 (aged 37) Washington, D.C., U.S.
- Party: Democratic
- Relatives: Luther C. Carter
- Occupation: Politician, lawyer

Timothy Jarvis Carter (August 18, 1800 – March 14, 1838) was a United States representative from Maine. He was born in Bethel in the Maine district of Massachusetts on August 18, 1800. He attended the town schools of Bethel, studied law in Northampton, Massachusetts, was admitted to the bar in 1826 and commenced practice in Rumford, Maine. He moved to Paris, Maine, in 1827 and continued the practice of law.

He was appointed secretary of the Maine State Senate in 1833, was a county attorney 1833–1837. He was elected as a Democrat to the 25th United States Congress and served from March 4, 1837, until his death in Washington, D.C., on March 14, 1838.

Carter's siblings included Luther C. Carter, who also served in Congress.

== See also ==
- List of members of the United States Congress who died in office (1790–1899)

U.S. House of Representatives
Preceded by Moses Mason, Jr.	Member of the U.S. House of Representatives from Maine's 5th congressional district 1837–1838	Succeeded by Virgil D. Parris
