= Daniel W. Ames =

American politician

Daniel W. Ames (17 June 1830 – 22 February 1911) was an American politician from Maine. Ames, a Republican, represented Portland in the Maine House of Representatives from 1883 to 1886.

He was originally from Norridgewock and married Sarah E. Wing there on September 19, 1851. His wife died two years later of consumption. In 1855, he was a postmaster and justice of the peace in Norridgewock. During the American Civil War, he was a member of the 1st Maine Volunteer Cavalry Regiment.
