= Clara Barnes Martin =

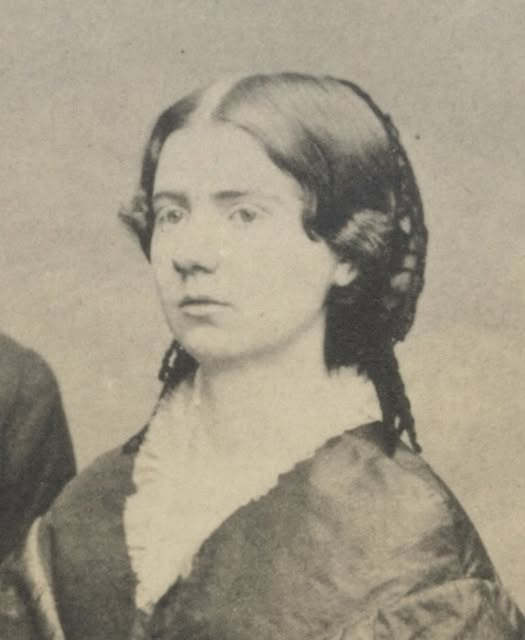
- Born: May 12, 1838; Waterville, Maine, United States
- Died: August 9, 1886 (aged 48); Boston, Massachusetts, United States
- Occupations: author, educator, travel writer
- Spouse: Abel C. Martin (m. 1864; death 1879)

Clara Barnes Martin (May 12, 1838 - August 9, 1886) was an American author, educator, and travel writer. She is best known for Mount Desert on the Coast of Maine (1867), an early guidebook to an area of what is now Acadia National Park in Maine. She also established the Otis Place School for women in Boston, Massachusetts.

== Early life and education ==
Martin was born in Waterville, Maine, on May 12, 1838 to Phinehas Barnes, editor of the Portland Advertiser newspaper, and Anne Judson Butler Barnes. Martin was the eldest of eight siblings.

In 1839, the family moved to Portland, Maine, where Martin graduated from Portland High School.

== Marriage and children ==
Clara Barnes married Boston architect Abel C. Martin in 1864 in Portland, Maine. In 1865, they had a daughter, also named Clara Barnes Martin. Their daughter died in 1868 at the age of two. In 1879, Abel was trampled by a horse after stepping out of a carriage, and he died several days later on 29 October.

== Career ==
=== Writing ===
Martin's Mount Desert on the Coast of Maine was one of the earliest published guidebooks to Mount Desert Island, part of what is now Acadia National Park. The book began in 1866 as a series of articles in the Portland Transcript. It was first printed privately as a book in 1867 and again in 1870; six editions were ultimately published. The book sold for 75 cents and received favorable contemporary reviews.

Martin's first children's book, The Story of Muff, was published in 1867 and reprinted in 1868 and 1877. Set during the Great Portland Fire of July 4, 1866, the book tells the story of a family's cat that becomes separated from its owners during the evacuation and is later found alive in the ruins of their home. A contemporary reviewer wrote that Martin had "won golden opinions by her charming 'Story of Muff.'" Martin wrote and sold the book to help raise funds to build the Payson Memorial Church. The church was needed to replace the parish's original meeting house which was destroyed in the fire. The Story of Muff was followed by two more children's books: The Little Notions: A Summer's Life (1870) and A Child's Faith in Fairies (1875).

In addition to her books, Martin contributed book reviews and literary criticism to magazines such as The Nation and The Atlantic Monthly.

=== Contributions to education ===
Martin taught at Portland High School until her marriage. In 1872, Martin's husband designed and built the Otis Place School at 5 Otis Place in Boston, Massachusetts. The Otis Place School was a private school for girls, and Clara served as its principal. An advertisement for the school in the Portland Daily Press offered "thorough training for girls" and preparation for the Harvard Examinations for Women. The examinations were first administered by Harvard in 1874 and required a rigorous course of study that was unusual for girls' preparatory schools at that time. In the advertisement, Clara also listed both Oliver Wendell Holmes and poet Henry W. Longfellow as references. Martin and her father both corresponded with Holmes, father of the Supreme Court justice. Otis Place School closed in 1886 upon Martin's death.

== Death and legacy ==
Martin died on August 9, 1886 at the age of 48. Her correspondence is available in the Digital Maine Repository.

== Published works ==
- Martin, Clara Barnes (1867). Mount Desert on the Coast of Maine. Loring, Short & Harmon.
- Martin, Clara Barnes (1867). The Story of Muff: A Contribution to the Fair of the Second Parish, for the Payson Memorial Church. Loring, Short & Harmon.
- Martin, Clara Barnes (1870). The Little Notions: A Summer's Life. Loring, Short & Harmon.
- Martin, Clara Barnes (1875). A Child's Faith in Fairies. Loring, Short & Harmon.
