= Brighton Abattoir =

Former slaughterhouse in Brighton, Boston, United States

Coordinates: 42°21′33.85″N 71°9′1.02″W

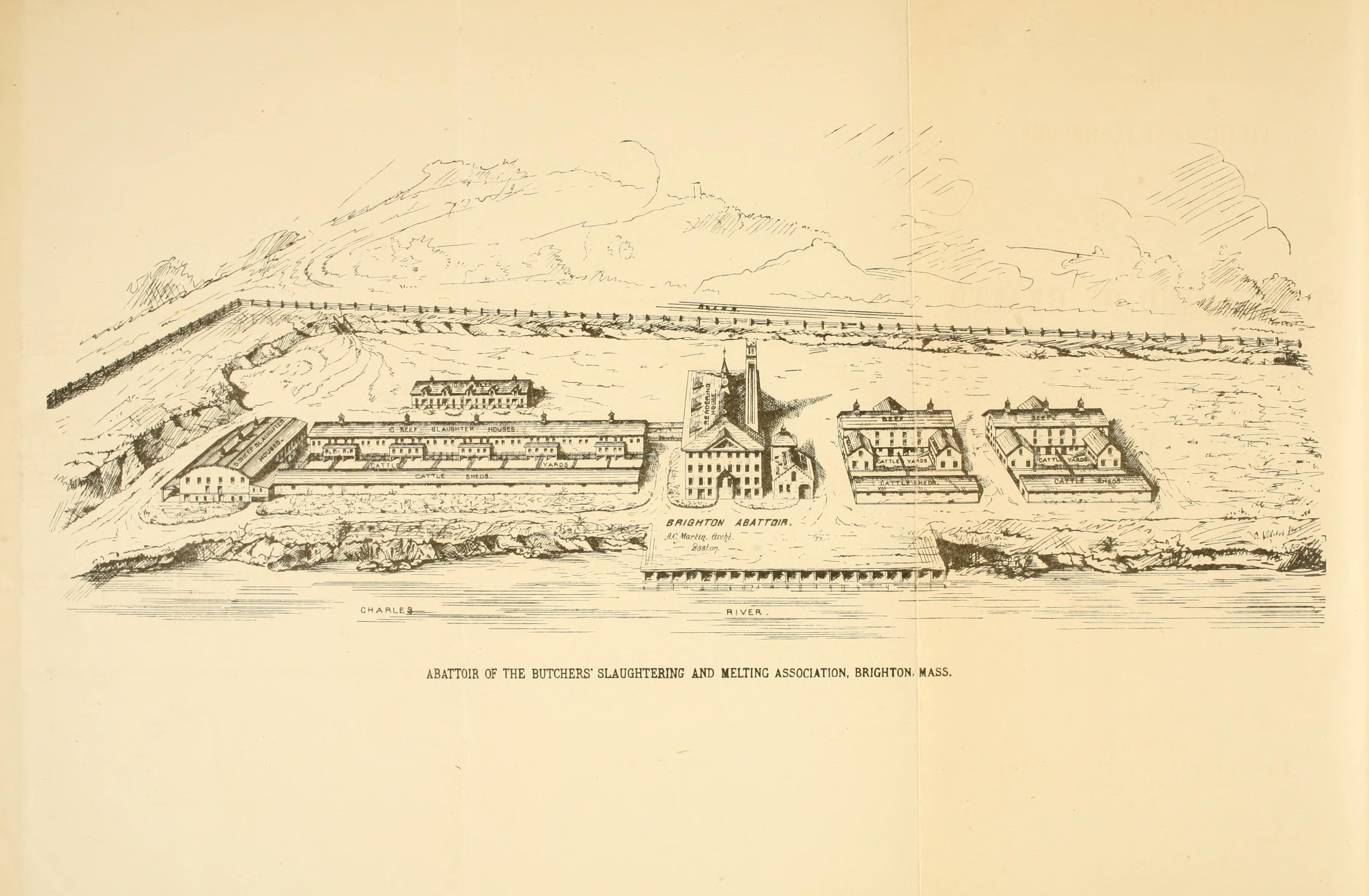
An 1872 drawing by architect Martin of the Brighton Abattoir complex.

The Brighton Abattoir was a slaughterhouse located in Brighton, Boston. It operated across Market Street from the Brighton Stock Yards, as cattle would be located into rail cars of the Boston and Albany Railroad and transported west from the yards.

The abattoir was established in 1872 and closed in 1957. Its original buildings were designed by the Boston architect Abel C. Martin.
