= Benjamin White (Maine politician) =

American politician (1790–1860)

Benjamin White (May 13, 1790 – June 7, 1860) was a U.S. representative from Maine.

Born in Goshen, Massachusetts (now Vienna, Maine), White attended the common schools. He moved to Winthrop, in 1802 and was employed on a farm until 1808 when he entered Farmington Academy. He taught school for several years. During the War of 1812, he was in Augusta, and assisted in raising troops, later serving as a noncommissioned officer with troops stationed at Castine and Eastport. He again engaged in teaching in Montville, Maine, until 1821, when he also engaged in the sawmill business and agricultural pursuits. He served as town selectman. He served as member of the Maine House of Representatives in 1829, 1841, and 1842.

White was elected as a Democrat to the Twenty-eighth Congress (March 4, 1843 – March 3, 1845). He resumed his former pursuits. He died in Montville, Maine, on June 7, 1860. He was interred in Halldale Cemetery, North Montville, Maine.

U.S. House of Representatives
Preceded by Nathaniel Littlefield	Member of the U.S. House of Representatives from Maine's 5th congressional district 1843–1845	Succeeded by Cullen Sawtelle
