= Norridgewock Female Academy =

- U.S. National Register of Historic Places
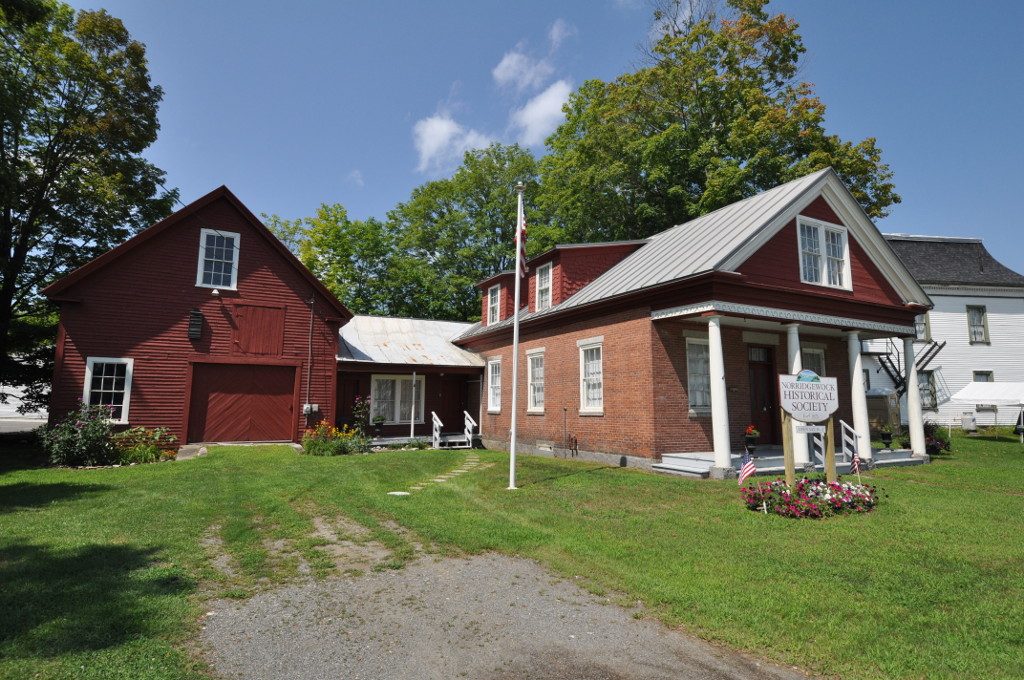

- Location within Maine Location within the United States
- Location: US 2 N side, .05 mi. W of jct. with Upper Main St., Norridgewock, Maine
- Coordinates: 44°42′48″N 69°47′54″W
- Area: less than one acre
- Built: 1837
- Architectural style: Greek Revival
- NRHP reference No.: 96000244
- Added to NRHP: March 7, 1996

The former Norridgewock Female Academy, now home to the Norridgewock Historical Society, is a historic school property on Mercer Road (United States Route 2), just west of its junction with Upper Main Street in Norridgewock, Maine. Its Greek Revival building was built in 1837, when the school was founded, and was used by that institution until 1860. The building is regionally distinctive as one of a few surviving Greek Revival school buildings with a Greek temple portico. It was listed on the National Register of Historic Places in 1996.

== Description and history ==
The Norridgewock Female Academy is set in the village of Norridgewock, adjacent to the later Eaton School building on the north side of Mercer Road, just west of its junction with Upper Main Street. It is a 1 1/2-story brick structure with a front-facing gable and a modest Greek temple front with four Tuscan columns and fully enclosed wood frame pediment. The tympanum of the pediment is finished in flushboard, and has two sash windows at its center. Below the portico, the facade is three bays wide, with a simple entry flanked by sash windows. At the rear of this block a single-story wood-frame ell extends to the left, joining it to a wood-frame carriage house.

The Norridgewock Female Academy was established in 1837, and the main block of this building was constructed that year on land donated by Dr. Amos Townsend. The school operated until 1860; among its notable graduates was Rebecca Sophia Clarke, who later wrote children's books under the pen name "Sophie May". The property was then used by the Eaton School (founded 1865) prior to the construction in 1866-67 of its Second Empire edifice next door. This building was then adapted by the Eaton School for use as faculty housing, a role it filled until the 1880s, when it was sold into private hands. The building was purchased by the Norridgewock Historical Society in 1994, which now houses its museum in the building.

== See also ==
- National Register of Historic Places listings in Somerset County, Maine
