= James W. Ripley =

American politician (1786–1835)

Member of the Massachusetts House of Representatives
- In office 1814–1819

Member of the United States House of Representatives from Maine's 5th district
- In office September 11, 1826 – March 12, 1830
- Preceded by: Enoch Lincoln
- Succeeded by: Cornelius Holland

Personal details
- Born: March 12, 1786 Hanover, New Hampshire
- Died: June 17, 1835 (aged 49) Fryeburg, Maine
- Resting place: Village Cemetery, Fryeburg, Maine
- Party: Jacksonian
- Spouse: Abigail Osgood
- Relations: Eleazar Wheelock Ripley
- Education: Fryeburg Academy
- Profession: Attorney; Politician

James Wheelock Ripley (March 12, 1786 – June 17, 1835) was an American attorney and Jacksonian politician. He served as a member of the United States House of Representatives and the Massachusetts House of Representatives during the 1800s.

== Early life and career ==
Ripley was born in Hanover, New Hampshire the son of Sylvanus Ripley and Abigail Wheelock Ripley. He attended the common schools and Fryeburg Academy, studied law and was admitted to the bar. He began the practice of law in Fryeburg, Maine, (which was a part of Massachusetts until 1820).

He served in the War of 1812 and was elected a member of the Massachusetts House of Representatives, serving from 1814 to 1819. He was elected from Maine to the Nineteenth Congress to fill the vacancy caused by the resignation of Enoch Lincoln. On the same day he was elected to the Twentieth Congress. He was reelected to the Twenty-first Congress, serving in Congress from September 11, 1826, to March 12, 1830, when he resigned.

After leaving Congress, Ripley resumed the practice of law and was a collector of customs for the district of Passamaquoddy, Maine, from December 16, 1830, until his death in Fryeburg on June 17, 1835. He is interred in the Village Cemetery in Fryeburg.

== Personal life ==
Ripley married Abigail Osgood, and they had eight children. Ripley was the brother of Eleazar Wheelock Ripley, a brigadier general in the War of 1812 and a U. S. Representative from Louisiana.

U.S. House of Representatives
Preceded by Vacant	Member of the U.S. House of Representatives from Maine's 5th congressional district 1826–1830	Succeeded by Vacant
