= Virgil D. Parris =

American politician from Maine (1807–1874)

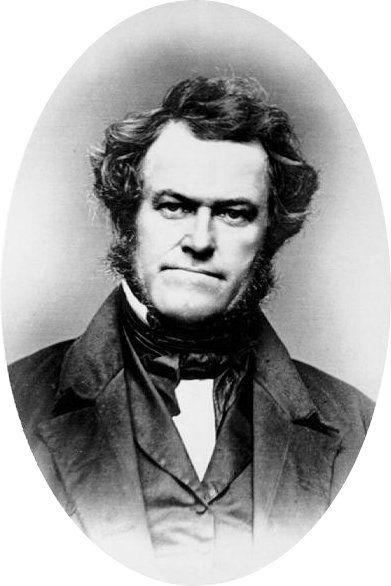
- Parris c. 1843

21st President of the Maine Senate
- In office March 1843 – January 3, 1844
- Preceded by: Edward Kavanagh
- Succeeded by: John W. Dana

Member of the Maine Senate from the 14th district
- In office January 7, 1842 – January 3, 1844
- Succeeded by: William Frye
- Constituency: Oxford County

Member of the U.S. House of Representatives from Maine's 5th district
- In office May 29, 1838 – March 3, 1841
- Preceded by: Timothy J. Carter
- Succeeded by: Nathaniel Littlefield

Member of the Maine House of Representatives from Buckfield
- In office January 4, 1832 – May 29, 1838
- Preceded by: Henry H. Hutchinson
- Succeeded by: Daniel Chase

Personal details
- Born: Virgil Delphini Parris; February 18, 1807 Buckfield, District of Maine, Massachusetts, U.S.
- Died: June 13, 1874 (aged 67) Paris, Maine, U.S.
- Resting place: Old Cemetery
- Party: Democratic
- Relatives: Albion Parris (cousin)
- Education: Hebron Academy; Colby College; Union College
- Profession: Politician, lawyer

Virgil Delphini Parris (February 18, 1807 – June 13, 1874) was a U.S. representative from Maine, and cousin of Albion Parris.

Born in Buckfield, Massachusetts (now in Maine), Parris attended the common schools, whereupon he entered Hebron Academy in Hebron, then Colby College in Waterville. He was graduated from Union College at Schenectady, New York in 1827. He studied law. Parris was admitted to the bar in 1830 and commenced practice in Buckfield, Maine. He served as assistant secretary of the Maine Senate in 1831, and as a member of the Maine House of Representatives between 1832 and 1837.

Parris was elected as a Democrat to the Twenty-fifth Congress to fill the vacancy caused by the death of Timothy J. Carter. He was reelected to the Twenty-sixth Congress and served from May 29, 1838, to March 3, 1841, but was an unsuccessful candidate for renomination in 1840. He then served as a member of the Maine Senate in 1842 and 1843, part of the time serving as president and as acting governor of the state. From 1844 to 1848, Parris served as United States marshal for the district of Maine, then as special mail agent for New England in 1853. He was appointed naval storekeeper at the Portsmouth Naval Shipyard in 1856. He served as delegate to the Democratic National Conventions in 1852 and 1872.

Parris died in Paris, Maine, June 13, 1874. He was interred in the Rawson family knoll in the Old Cemetery.

U.S. House of Representatives
Preceded by Timothy J. Carter	Member of the U.S. House of Representatives from Maine's 5th congressional district 1838–1841	Succeeded by Nathaniel Littlefield
