= Brighton Stock Yards =

Coordinates: 42°21′24.85″N 71°8′37.75″W

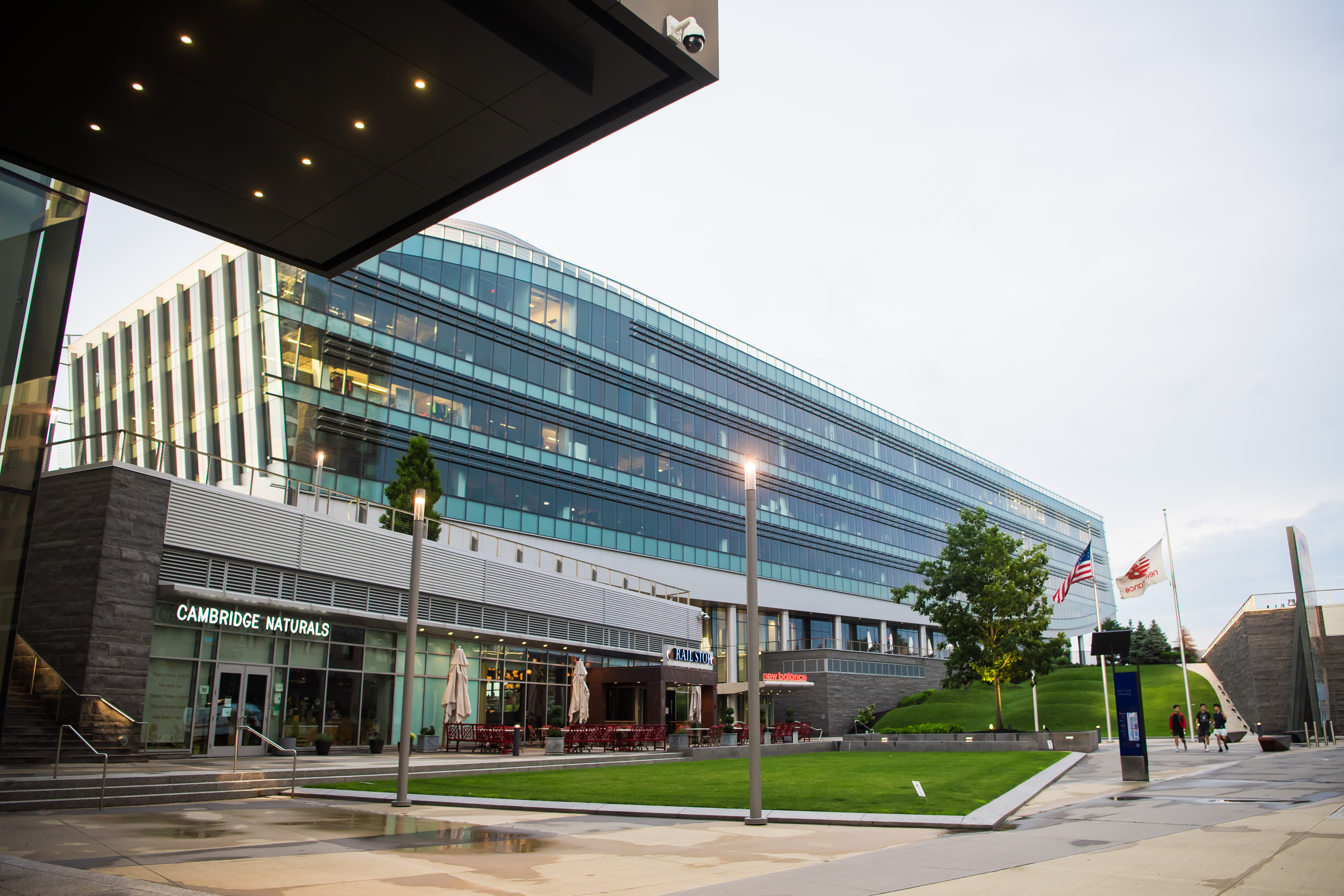
Currently, New Balance's headquarters are placed on top of the old Brighton Stock Yards.

The Brighton Stock Yards were stockyards located in Brighton, Boston. It operated across Market Street from the Brighton Abattoir, as cattle would be loaded into rail cars of the Boston and Albany Railroad and transported west.
