= Nathaniel Littlefield =

American politician (1804–1882)

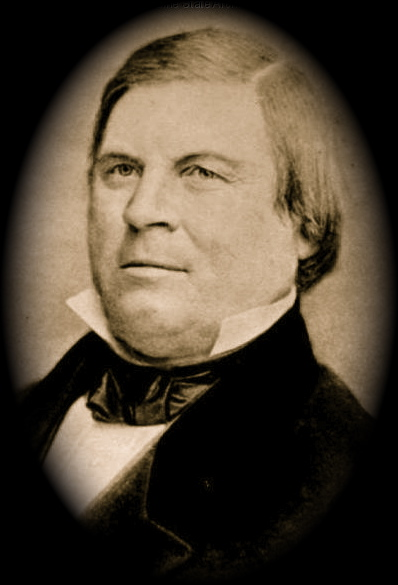

Personal details
- Born: September 20, 1804 Wells, Massachusetts (now Maine)
- Died: August 15, 1882 (aged 77) Bridgton, Maine
- Party: Democratic

Nathaniel Littlefield (September 20, 1804 – August 15, 1882) was a United States representative from Maine.

== Biography ==
Nathaniel Swett Littlefield was born in Wells, Massachusetts (now in Maine) on September 20, 1804. He attended the common schools, studied law, was admitted to the bar in 1827 and commenced practice in Bridgton. He served as postmaster from 1827 to 1841, and held local office, including selectman.

He was appointed secretary of the Maine State Senate. He was elected to the Maine Senate, and served 1837 to 1839. In 1838 he served as the Senate's President pro Tempore.

Littlefield was elected as a Democrat to the Twenty-seventh Congress (March 4, 1841 – March 3, 1843) from Maine's 5th congressional district. After his term he returned to Bridgton and resumed the practice of law.

He was elected to the Thirty-first Congress, March 4, 1849 to March 3, 1851, from Maine's 2nd district and served as chairman of the Agriculture Committee. He was not a candidate for renomination to the Thirty-second Congress.

Littlefield was elected a member of the Maine House of Representatives in 1854, and was a delegate to the 1866 National Union Convention in Philadelphia.

He died in Bridgton on August 15, 1882. His interment was in the High Street Cemetery.

In Bridgton he became notorious for his actions against the Anti-Slavery society begun by Parson Joseph P. Fessenden, uncle of William Pitt Fessenden. Littlefield's efforts culminated in an 1835 attack on a meeting held in the old town hall, for which he was fined $25 by the court of Common Pleas.

U.S. House of Representatives
| Preceded by Virgil D. Parris | Member of the U.S. House of Representatives from Maine's 5th congressional district March 4, 1841 – March 3, 1843 | Succeeded by Benjamin White |
| Preceded by Asa Clapp | Member of the U.S. House of Representatives from Maine's 2nd congressional district March 4, 1849 – March 3, 1851 | Succeeded by John Appleton |
