= Ephraim K. Smart =

American politician (1813–1872)

Ephraim Knight Smart

Member of the U.S. House of Representatives from Maine's 5th district
- In office March 4, 1847 – March 3, 1849
- Preceded by: Cullen Sawtelle
- Succeeded by: Cullen Sawtelle

Member of the U.S. House of Representatives from Maine's 5th district
- In office March 4, 1851 – March 3, 1853
- Preceded by: Cullen Sawtelle
- Succeeded by: Israel Washburn, Jr.

Member of the Maine Senate

Member of the Maine House of Representatives
- In office 1858

Personal details
- Born: September 3, 1813 Prospect, Massachusetts
- Died: September 29, 1872 (aged 59) Camden, Maine
- Resting place: Mountain Street Cemetery
- Party: Democratic

Ephraim Knight Smart (September 3, 1813 – September 29, 1872) was a United States representative from Maine.

== Early life ==
Smart was born in Prospect, Massachusetts, on September 3, 1813. He attended the common schools, completed preparatory studies under private tutors, and attended Maine Wesleyan Seminary. He studied law, was admitted to the bar and commenced practice in Camden.

== Career ==
Smart was appointed postmaster in Camden in 1838. He was elected a member of the Maine State Senate. He was appointed aide-de-camp with the rank of lieutenant colonel on the staff of Governor Fairfield in 1842. Smart moved to Missouri in 1843 and continued the practice of his profession. He returned to Camden the following year, resumed the practice of law, and was again appointed postmaster. He was elected as a Democrat to the Thirtieth Congress (March 4, 1847 – March 3, 1849) and to the Thirty-second Congress (March 4, 1851 – March 3, 1853).

After retirement, he served as collector of customs at Belfast 1853-1858. He established the Maine Free Press in 1854, and served as editor for three years. He was elected a member of the Maine House of Representatives in 1858, and was an unsuccessful candidate for Governor of Maine in 1860. He again served in the State Senate, moved to Biddeford and established the Maine Democrat.

== Death ==
Smart died in Camden on September 29, 1872. He was interred at Mountain Street Cemetery.

Party political offices
Preceded by Manassah H. Smith	Democratic nominee for Governor of Maine; 1860	Succeeded by John W. Dana
U.S. House of Representatives
Preceded by Cullen Sawtelle	Member of the U.S. House of Representatives from Maine's 5th congressional district March 4, 1847 – March 3, 1849	Succeeded by Cullen Sawtelle
Preceded by Cullen Sawtelle	Member of the U.S. House of Representatives from Maine's 5th congressional district March 4, 1851 – March 3, 1853	Succeeded by Israel Washburn, Jr.
