= Rebecca Sophia Clarke =

American writer (1833-1906)

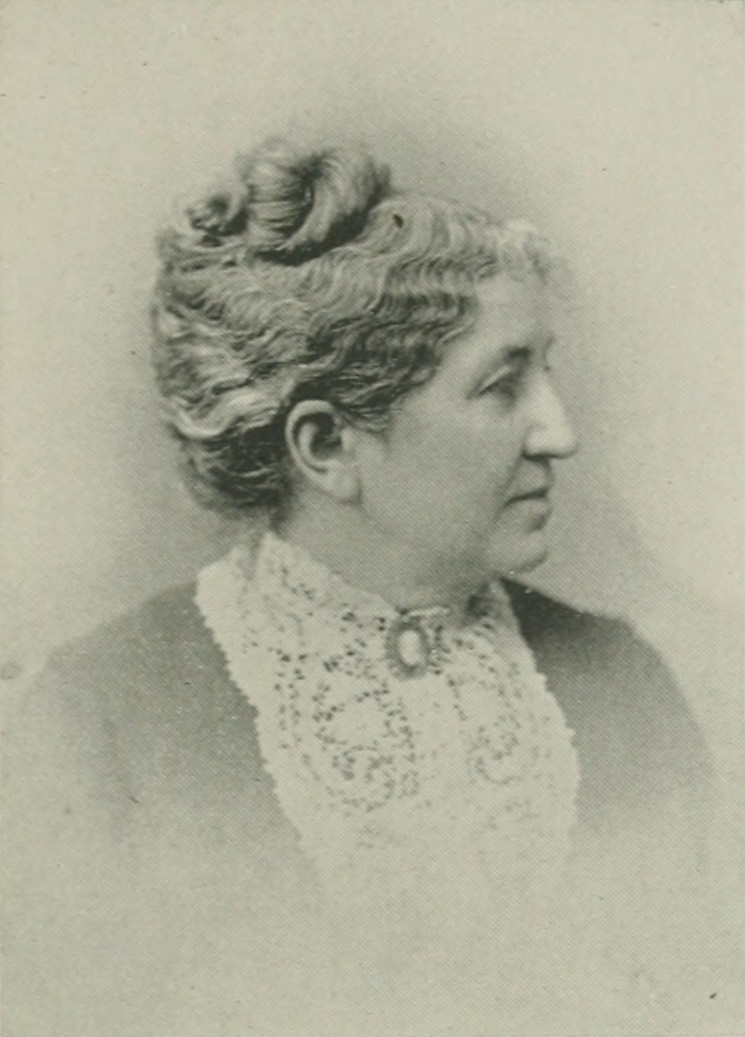
Rebecca Sophia Clarke (1833-1906)

Rebecca Sophia Clarke (February 22, 1833 – August 10, 1906), also known as Sophie May, was an American author of children's fiction. Using her nieces and nephews as inspiration, she wrote realistic stories about children. Between 1860 and 1903, she wrote 45 books, the most popular being the Little Prudy series. She spent most of her life in her native town of Norridgewock, Maine.

== Early life and education ==
Rebecca Sophia Clarke was born in Norridgewock, Maine, to Asa and Sophia Clarke on February 22, 1833. She was tutored at home in the classical languages of Greek and Latin and attended school at the Norridgewock Female Academy. Along with her well-rounded education, preparation for her role as a writer probably began with her diary, which she kept from ages nine to eleven, diligently recording the sermons, debates and lectures she attended. At age 18, she moved to Evansville, Indiana, where she taught school. Her teaching career ended 10 years later due to a severe hearing loss and in 1861, she returned to her family home in Maine where she lived with her sister, Sarah Jones Clarke (1840-1929), who also wrote children's books and used the pen name, Penn Shirley.

== Career ==
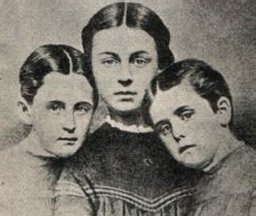
Clarke's nieces; the inspiration for Prudy, Susy, and Dotty Dimple.

Clarke's work was published using the pseudonym, "Sophie May". She penned that name in 1861 and used it to sign her first story, which was published in the Memphis Appeal. When the story was finished, she signed her name, Sophie, and then said: "Well, I'll call it May, for I may write again and I may not".

Clarke was called "the Dickens of the nursery". The children in her books were often naughty and uninhibited. She was one of the first authors to write stories for children that depicted them realistically with all their humor, imagination and mischievousness, unlike the impossibly perfect children of previous fiction. Her most successful stories were of the Little Prudy characters which made their first appearance in short stories for children's periodicals, such as Grace Greenewood's The Little Pilgrim and the Congregationalist. Clarke's nieces were the inspiration for her characters: Prudy, Susy, and Dotty Dimple. The series was later published into books. She also contributed to other children's magazines, including Merry's Museum. From 1861 until 1903, Clarke wrote forty-five books, thirty-seven of these were series books and at least five of the others were also for children.

== Later years ==
Clarke gave the city of Norridgewock a "brick building at the end of the bridge, to be used for library purposes and as a home for the "Village Improvement Society" in Norridgewock". She traveled and spent her winters in Baltimore, Florida, as well as California. After several months of "feeble health", Clarke died in Norridgewock, at the age of 73, on August 16, 1906. She is buried at the Old Oak Cemetery. Her longtime home in Norridgewock is listed on the National Register of Historic Places.

== List of works ==
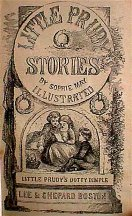
1868 frontispiece from Little Prudy's Dottie Dimple (Boston: Lee & Shepard)

- Little Prudy (series 1864-1868)

Little Prudy (1864), Sister Suzy (1864), Captain Horace (1864), Cousin Grace (1865), Fairy Book (1865), Dotty Dimple (1868)

- Dotty Dimple (series 1868-1869)

Dotty Dimple at Her Grandmother's (1868), Dotty Dimple Out West (1868), Dotty Dimple at Home (1868), Dotty Dimple at Play (1869), Dotty Dimple at School (1869), Dotty Dimple's Flyaway (1869)

- Little Prudy's Flyaway (series 1870-1873)

Little Folks Astray (1870), Prudy Keeping House (1870), Aunt Madge's Story (1871), Little Grandmother (1872), Little Grandfather (1873), Miss Thistledown (1873)

- Flaxie Frizzle (series 1876-1884)

Flaxie Frizzle (1876), Doctor Papa (1877), Little Pitchers (1878), Twin Cousins (1880), Flaxie's Kittyleen (1883), Flaxie Growing Up (1884)

- Little Prudy's Children (series 1894-1901)

Wee Lucy (1894), Jimmy Boy (1895), Kyzie Dunlee (1895), Wee Lucy's Secret (1899), Jimmy, Lucy, and All (1900), Lucy in Fairyland (1901)

- Quinnebasset Girls (series 1871-1903)

Doctor's Daughter (1871), Our Helen (1874), Asbury Twins (1875), Quinebasset Girls (1877), Janet (1882), In Old Quinnebasset (1891), Joy Bells (1903)

- Other known books

Kittyleen (1883)
Drones' Honey (1887),
Pauline Wyman (1897)
The Champion's Diamonds (1897)
