= Cullen Sawtelle =

American politician (1805–1887)

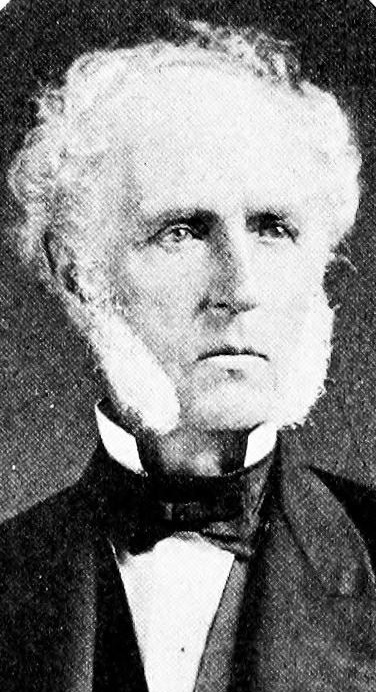
- From 1922's The Book of Englewood

Member of the United States House of Representatives
- In office March 4, 1849 – March 3, 1851
- Preceded by: Ephraim K. Smart
- Succeeded by: Ephraim K. Smart
- Constituency: Maine's 5th congressional district
- In office March 4, 1845 – March 3, 1847
- Preceded by: Benjamin White
- Succeeded by: Ephraim K. Smart

Member of the Maine Senate
- In office 1843–1845 Serving with Harris Garcelon
- Preceded by: None (district created)
- Succeeded by: Joseph Barrett, Rufus K. J. Porter
- Constituency: 12th district

Personal details
- Born: September 25, 1805 Norridgewock, Massachusetts (now Maine), U.S.
- Died: November 10, 1887 (aged 82) Englewood, New Jersey, U.S.
- Resting place: Brookside Cemetery, Englewood, New Jersey
- Party: Democratic
- Spouse: Elizabeth Lyman (m. 1830–1886, her death)
- Children: 3 (including Charles G. Sawtelle)
- Education: Bowdoin College
- Occupation: Attorney

Cullen Sawtelle (September 25, 1805 – November 10, 1887) was an American attorney and politician from Maine. He was most notable for his service as a U.S. representative from 1845 to 1847 and 1849 to 1851.

== Biography ==
Sawtelle was born in Norridgewock, Massachusetts (now Maine) on September 25, 1805, a son of Richard Sawtelle and Sarah "Sally" (Ware) Sawtelle. He received his early education under private tutors and in 1825 he graduated from Bowdoin College in Brunswick, Maine. He studied law with Charles Greene of Athens, Maine and Daniel Wells of Greenfield, Massachusetts, attained admission to the bar in 1828, and practiced in Norridgewock.

A Democrat in politics, he served as register of probate for Somerset County from 1830 to 1838. From 1843 to 1845, he was a member of the Maine Senate.

In 1844, Sawtelle was elected to represent Maine's 5th congressional district in the United States House of Representatives. He served in the 29th United States Congress (March 4, 1845 to March 3, 1847), and was chairman of the Committee on Revisal and Unfinished Business.

Sawtelle was elected to another term in 1848 and served in the 31st United States Congress March 4, 1849 to March 3, 1851. During his second term, Sawtelle was chairman of the Committee on Revolutionary Claims.

After leaving Congress, Sawtelle relocated to New York City, where he was an attorney and credit manager for several mercantile firms until he retired in 1882.

Sawtelle died in Englewood, New Jersey, November 10, 1887. He was interred in Brookside Cemetery in Englewood.

== Family ==
In 1830, Sawtelle married Elizabeth Lyman (1809–1886). They were the parents of three children: Henrietta, Charles, and Catharine.

Their son Charles G. Sawtelle served as a brigadier general in the United States Army.

U.S. House of Representatives
Preceded by Benjamin White	Member of the U.S. House of Representatives from Maine's 5th congressional district 1845–1847	Succeeded by Ephraim K. Smart
Preceded by Ephraim K. Smart	Member of the U.S. House of Representatives from Maine's 5th congressional district 1849–1851	Succeeded by Ephraim K. Smart
