= Brighton, Boston =

Neighborhood of Boston, Massachusetts

Coordinates: 42.35°N 71.16°W

Brighton
- Neighborhood of Boston
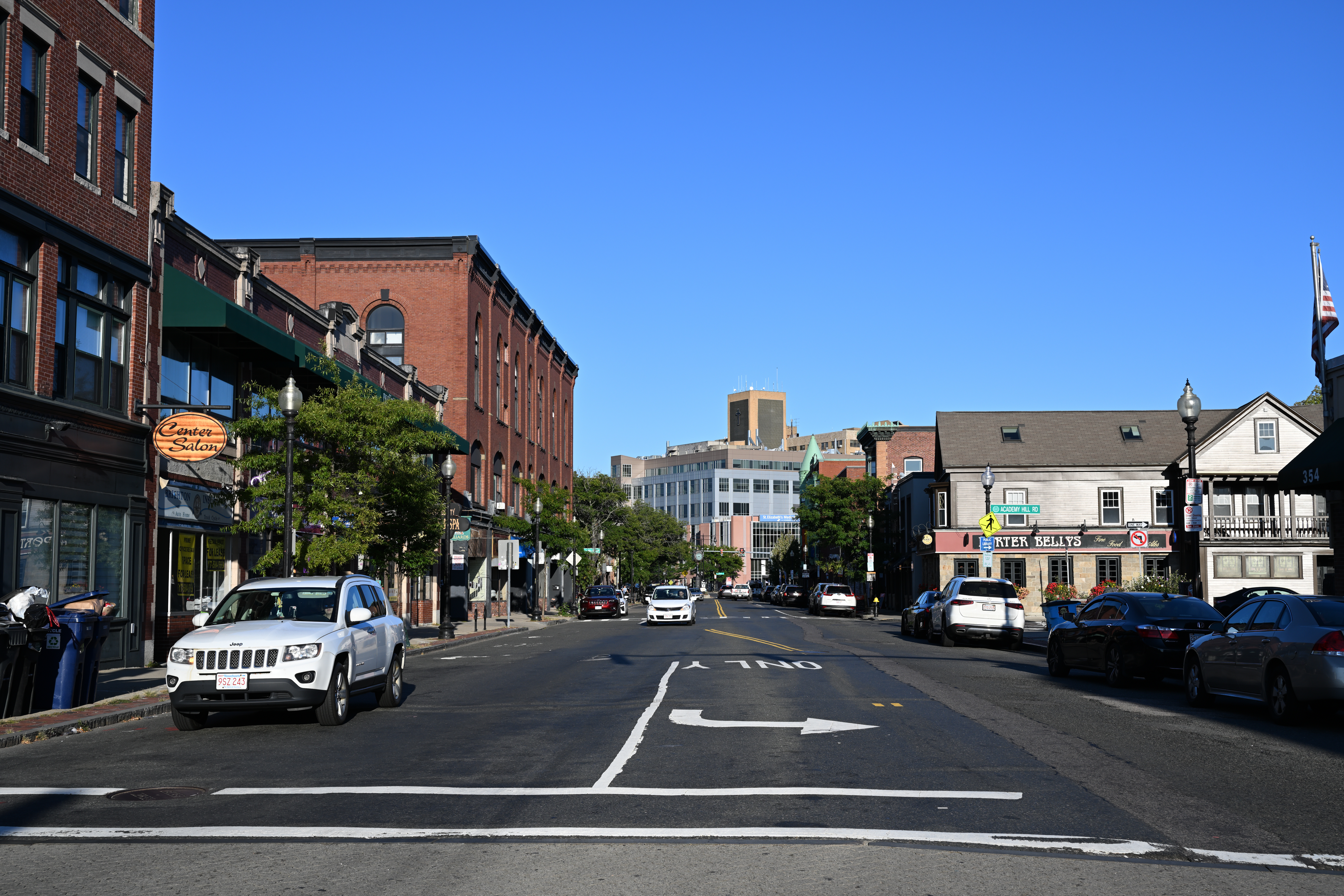
- Brighton Center, looking east down Washington Street
- Nicknames: Little Cambridge, South Cambridge, Third Parish (all archaic)
- Interactive map of Brighton
- Country: United States
- State: Massachusetts
- County: Suffolk
- Neighborhood of: Boston
- Settled: 1630
- Incorporated: February 24, 1807
- Annexed by Boston: January 5, 1874

Area
  - Land: 2.8 sq mi (7.2 km^{2})

Population
  - Total: 43,880
  - Density: 15,790/sq mi (6,095/km^{2})
- Time zone: Eastern
  - Summer (DST): Eastern
- Zip Code: 02135
- Area code: 617 / 857
- Website: Official website

Brighton is a former town and current neighborhood of Boston, Massachusetts, United States, located in the northwestern corner of the city. It is named after the English city of Brighton. Initially Brighton was part of Watertown, and was later part of Cambridge, and known as "Little Cambridge". Brighton separated from Cambridge in 1807 after a bridge dispute, and was annexed to Boston in 1874. For much of its early history, it was a rural town with a significant commercial center at its eastern end.

The neighborhood of Allston was also formerly part of the town of Brighton but is now officially separate. The name Allston–Brighton is still used for the combined area, owing to the neighborhoods' geographic and historical ties.

Brighton today is known for housing part of the campus of Boston College as well as the corporate headquarters of American multinational corporation New Balance. Brighton is served by the Green Line, the Boston Landing station of the MBTA Commuter Rail, and multiple bus lines.

This historic center of Brighton is the Brighton Center Historic District. The Aberdeen section of Brighton was designated as a local architectural conservation district by the Boston Landmarks Commission in 2001.

== History ==
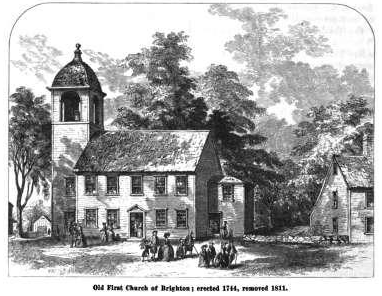
The Old First Church of Brighton 1744–1811

=== Early history ===
In 1630, land comprising present-day Allston–Brighton and Newton was assigned to Watertown. In 1634, the Massachusetts Bay Colony transferred ownership of the south side of the Charles River, including present-day Allston–Brighton and Newton, from Watertown to Newtowne, which was soon renamed Cambridge. In 1646, Reverend John Eliot established a "Praying Indian" village on the present Newton–Brighton boundary, where resided local natives converted to Christianity. The first permanent English settlement came as settlers crossed the Charles River from Cambridge, establishing Little Cambridge, the area's name before 1807.

Before the American Revolutionary War, Little Cambridge became a small, prosperous farming community with fewer than 300 residents. Its inhabitants included wealthy Boston merchants such as Benjamin Faneuil (after whom a street in Brighton is named). A key event in the history of Allston–Brighton was the establishment in 1775 of a cattle market to supply the Continental Army. Jonathan Winship I and Jonathan Winship II established the market, and in the post-war period that followed, the Winships became the largest meat packers in Massachusetts. The residents of Little Cambridge resolved to secede from Cambridge when the latter's government made decisions detrimental to the cattle industry and also failed to repair the Great Bridge linking Little Cambridge with Cambridge proper. Legislative approval for separation was obtained in 1807, and Little Cambridge renamed itself Brighton.

In 1820, the horticulture industry was introduced to the town. Over the next 20 years, Brighton blossomed as one of the most important gardening neighborhoods in the Boston area. Its businessmen did not neglect the cattle industry, however. In 1834, the Boston & Worcester Railroad was built, solidifying the community's hold on the cattle trade. By 1866, the town contained 41 slaughterhouses, which later were consolidated into the Brighton Stock Yards and Brighton Abattoir.

In October 1873, the Town of Brighton in Middlesex County voted to annex itself to the City of Boston in Suffolk County, and in January 1874 Brighton officially became part of the City of Boston. Allston–Brighton's population grew rapidly in the next 50 years, rising from 6,000 in 1875 to 47,000 by 1925.

=== Post-annexation ===
Since its inception in 1897, the Boston Marathon route has passed through Brighton. Many spectators gather every year along Commonwealth Avenue to cheer on runners.

In 2007, Boston-area public television affiliate WGBH-TV constructed new headquarters on Guest Street. In 2015, athletic footwear and apparel company New Balance also built a large headquarters complex on the street, after having been based nearby for over 35 years. Since the mid-2010s, there has been a large amount of mixed-use development in the Boston Landing area of northern Brighton, including the same-named Commuter Rail station, built as infill, and the Warrior Ice Arena, used as the Boston Bruins practice facility.

== Transportation ==
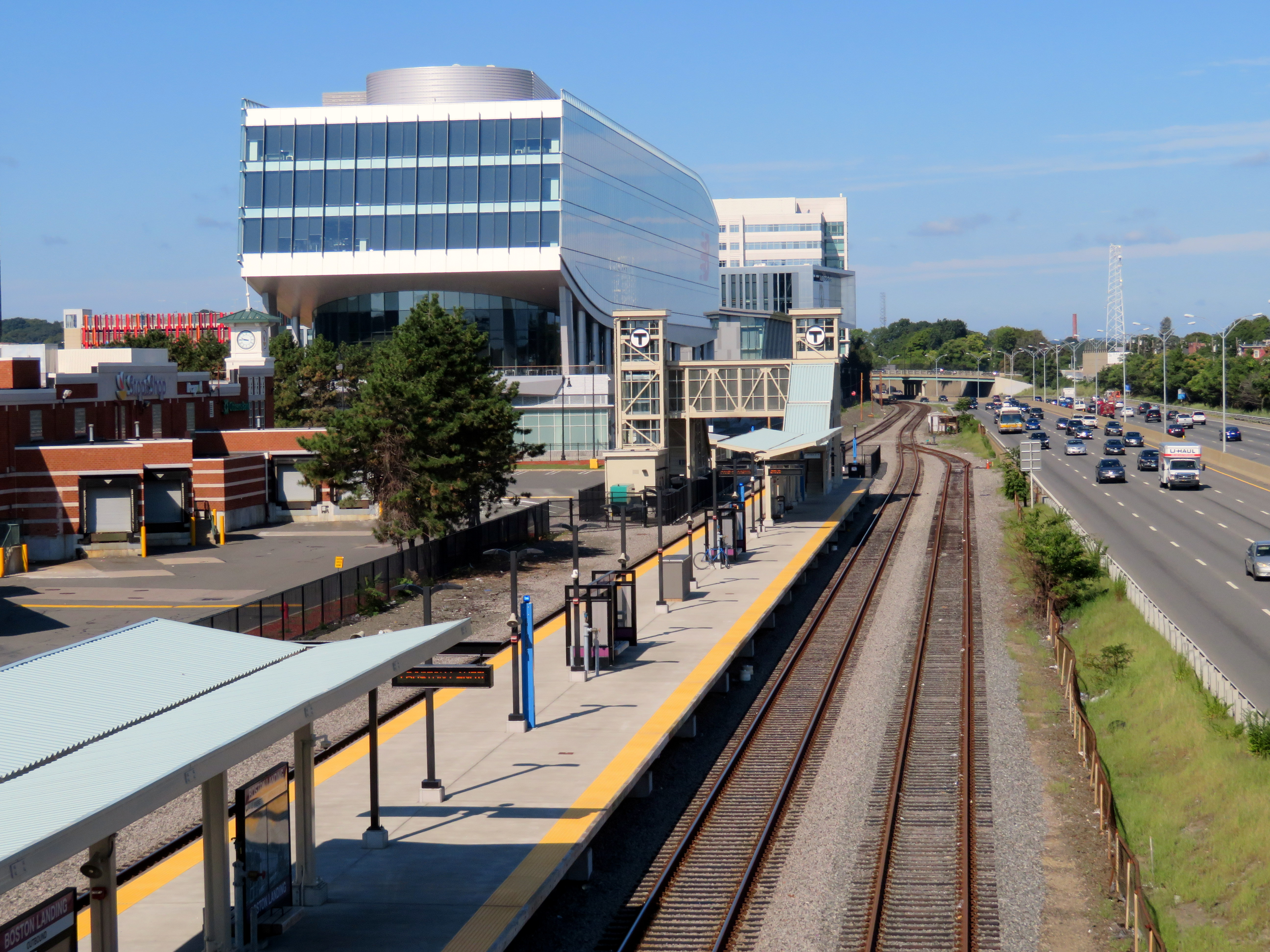
Boston Landing station from Everett Street, with the Massachusetts Turnpike on the right

Brighton is accessible via the B branch of the Massachusetts Bay Transportation Authority (MBTA)'s Green Line light rail service, which has 11 stops along Commonwealth Avenue in Brighton, terminating at the Boston College stop at the western edge of Brighton. Cleveland Circle on the C branch is located in the southern tip of Brighton, and Reservoir station on the D branch is located one block to the south. The former A branch of the Green Line, (discontinued in 1969), also served the community. Brighton is also served by MBTA bus routes 57, 64, 65, 66, 70, 86, 501, and 503, as well as Boston Landing station on the MBTA Commuter Rail Framingham/Worcester Line.

The Massachusetts Turnpike passes through northern Brighton, while Soldiers Field Road serves as another major crosstown roadway going towards Storrow Drive and downtown Boston. Cyclists may use the Charles River Bike Path, which runs alongside Soldiers Field Road for its stretch in Brighton.

== Geography ==
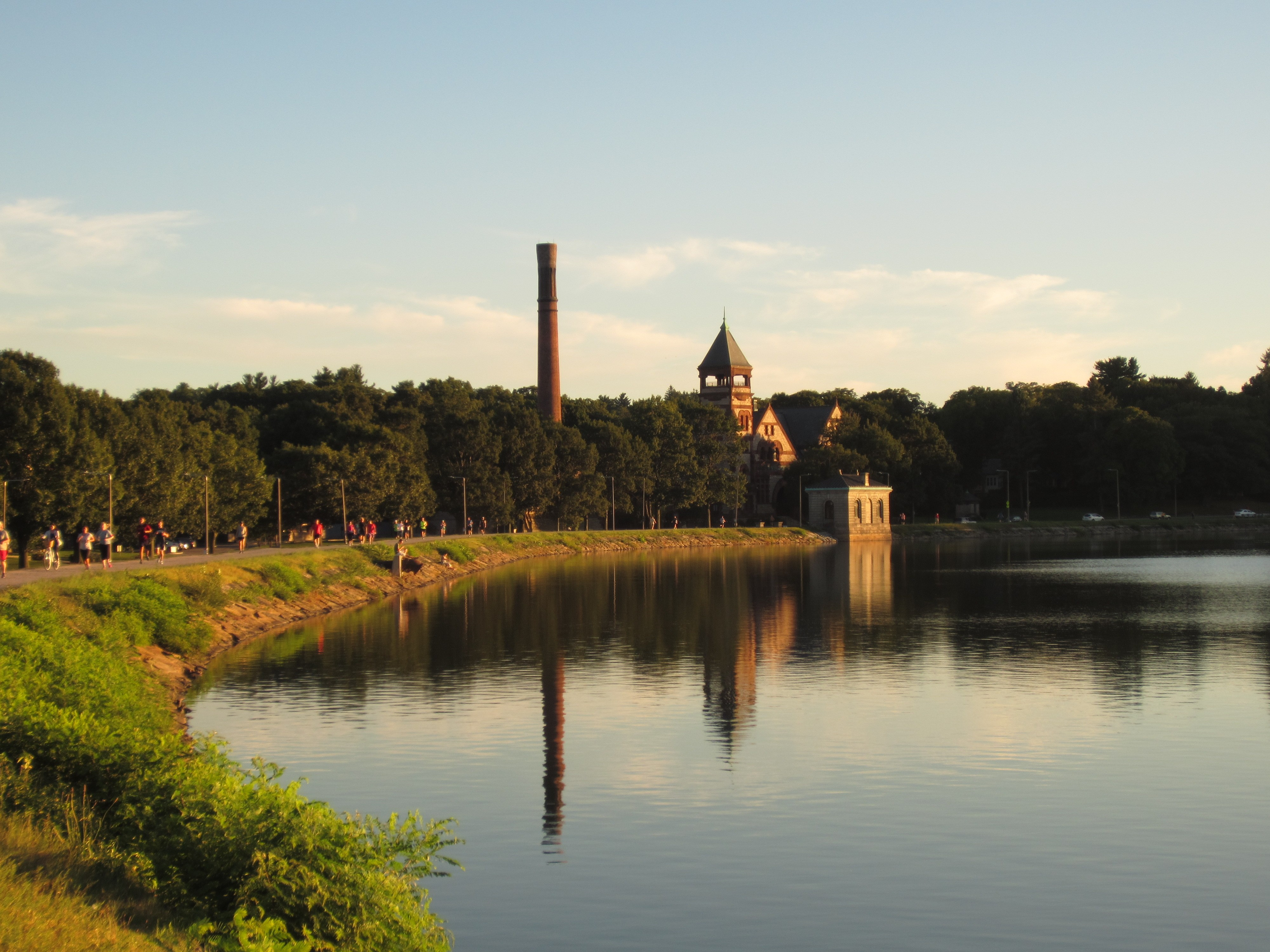
The Chestnut Hill Reservoir, with a popular path for jogging and walking

Brighton is connected to the rest of Boston by the adjacent neighborhood of Allston. It is otherwise surrounded by Cambridge, Watertown, Newton, and Brookline. The Charles River separates Brighton from Cambridge and Watertown. The unincorporated village of Chestnut Hill, which is located partially in Newton, Brookline, and Boston, is coextensive with Brighton near the Chestnut Hill Reservoir and Boston College campus. According to the Census Bureau, Brighton, defined by zip code 02135, has a land area of 2.78 square miles (7.2 km^{2}).

Brighton is broken down into multiple unofficial subdivisions, including Brighton Center, located along Washington Street. Oak Square is a residential neighborhood west of Brighton Center, adjacent to the Newton border.

Brighton is administered jointly at the municipal level with Allston. Brighton is generally to the west of Everett, Gordon and Kelton streets. As of 2020, the city councilor of Allston-Brighton is Liz Breadon.

== Demographics ==
As of 2020, the estimated population of Brighton is 48,330. The population density is 15,784 per mi^{2}, slightly lower than the citywide average of 16,686 per mi^{2}. The median age is 29.3. The largest measured age cohort is 25–34, which comprises 36.4% of the population (note: depending on methodology, college students might not be counted). 60.7% of the population have never been married.

The population was 65.5% white, 14.9% Asian American, 4.4% black or African American, and nearly 11.1% Hispanic of any race.

65.5% of Brighton residents graduated from a four-year college.

As of 2020, the median home price was $542,900 compared with $291,700 for the country as a whole, and the cost of living was 30% higher than the national average. Brighton has a comparatively older housing stock. The median home age was 67 years and 39.8% of homes were built before 1939.

=== Race and ancestry ===
Brighton (02135) Racial Breakdown of Population (2017)
Race	Percentage of 02135 population	Percentage of Massachusetts population	Percentage of United States population	ZIP Code-to-State Difference	ZIP Code-to-USA Difference
White	72.2%	81.3%	76.6%	–9.1%	–4.4%
White (Non-Hispanic)	66.3%	72.1%	60.7%	–5.8%	+5.6%
Asian	15.8%	6.9%	5.8%	+8.9%	+10.0%
Hispanic	10.2%	11.9%	18.1%	–1.7%	–7.9%
Black	5.1%	8.8%	13.4%	–3.7%	–8.3%
Native Americans/Hawaiians	0.5%	0.6%	1.5%	–0.1%	–1.0%
Two or more races	2.6%	2.4%	2.7%	+0.2%	–0.1%

== Education ==
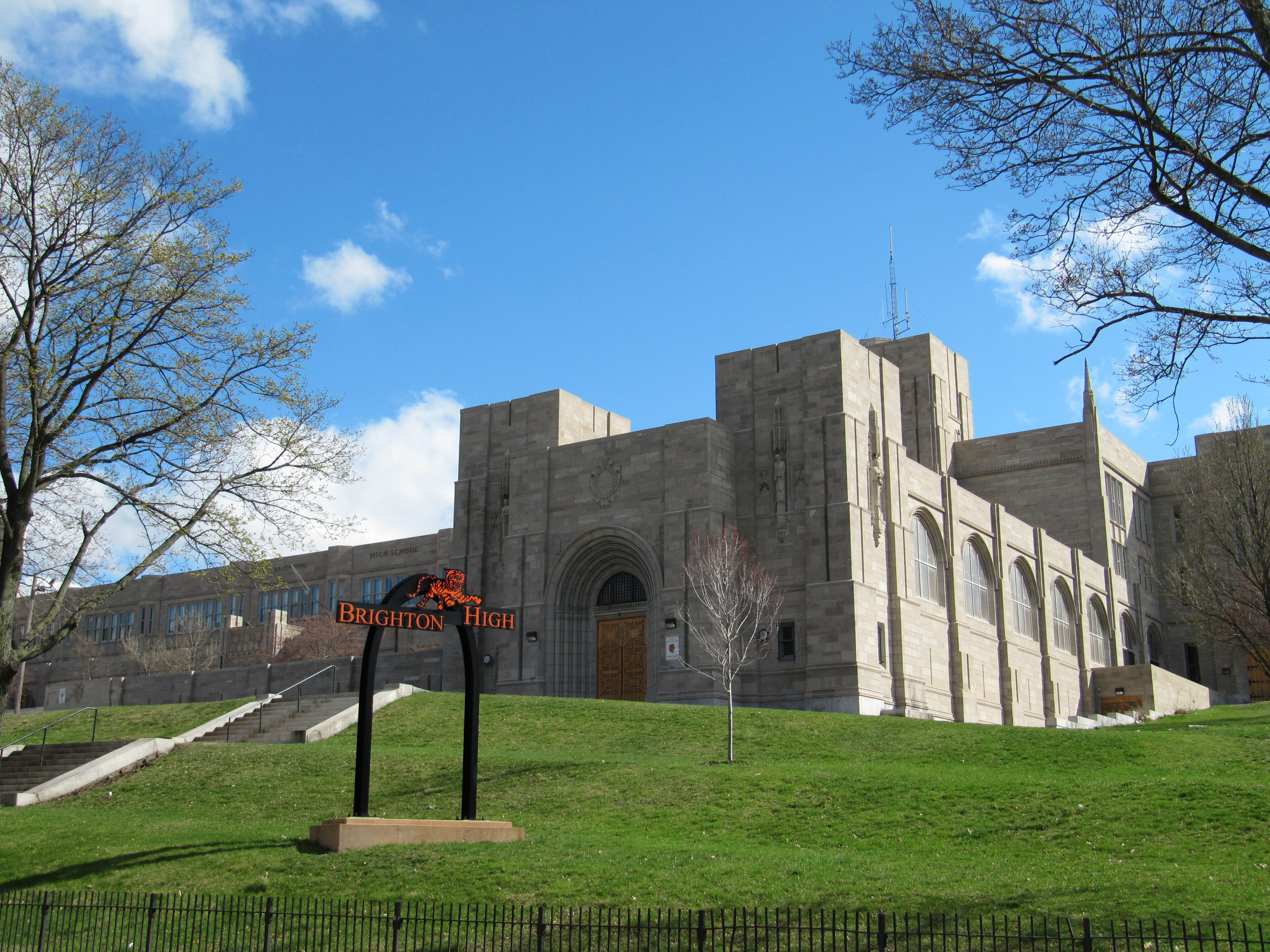
Brighton High School

Brighton is home to many Boston Public Schools:

Elementary

- Edison School
- Winship School
- Baldwin Pilot School
- Mary Lyon Lower School (K–8)

Secondary

- Boston Green Academy
- Brighton High School
- Mary Lyon Upper Pilot High School (9–12)
- Saint Joseph Preparatory High School

Brighton was historically home to many Catholic schools, many of which have closed. Our Lady of Presentation School is currently under study for landmark status by the Boston Landmarks Commission. Remaining are Saint Columbkille's School on Arlington Street (K–8) and St. Joseph's Preparatory Academy (formerly Mount St. Joseph Academy), a co-educational high school located on Cambridge Street. The Boston campus of EF Education First, an English and college preparatory school for international students, is located on Lake Street.

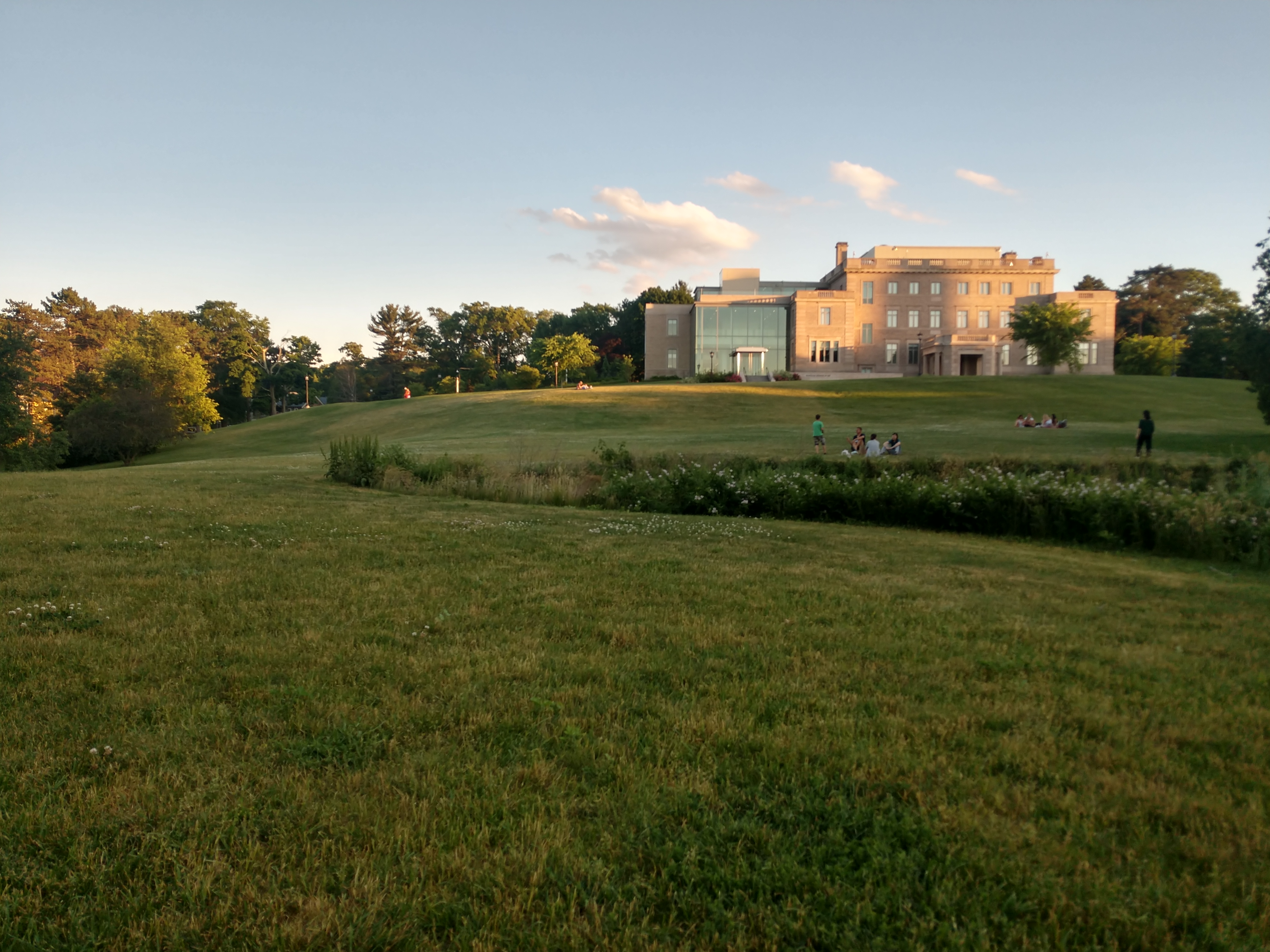
The McMullen Museum of Art at Boston College

Brighton is home to the Everest Institute, Saint John's Seminary and portions of Boston College. The area is also close to other colleges, including Boston University, and houses many of their students and faculty.

== Notable people ==
- Michael Bloomberg, 108th mayor of New York City (born in Brighton, raised in Medford)
- Mike Brady, winner of nine PGA events between 1916 and 1926
- Fred Cusick, play-by-play announcer for the Boston Bruins for 45 years
- Steve DeOssie, former professional football player for the NFL's New York Giants and New England Patriots
- Dave Fay, sports journalist
- William F. Galvin, Massachusetts Secretary of the Commonwealth
- Beth Howland, actress
- John Kelleher, backup infielder in Major League Baseball, playing mainly for the Chicago Cubs
- John F. Kelly, the 5th U.S. Secretary of Homeland Security
- Joseph P. Kennedy II, son of Robert F. Kennedy; former U.S. Congressman for Massachusetts's 8th district
- Patrick J. Kennedy, son of Ted Kennedy; former U.S. Congressman for Rhode Island's 1st district
- Chang Sik Kim, South Korean Buddhist master and founder of the art of Shim Gum Do, a Korean sword school
- John Krasinski, film actor, director, writer
- Dennis Lehane, author of Mystic River and many other Boston-based novels
- Mr. Lif, rapper
- Theodore B. Lyman, fourth Bishop of the Episcopal Diocese of North Carolina
- Joe Matson, racing driver
- Mike Milbury, former coach and player of the NHL's Boston Bruins
- Amy Poehler, actress writer and comedian, lived on Strathmore Road while in college
- Ernest W. Prussman, recipient of the Medal of Honor
- Edmund Rice, brigadier general and recipient of the Medal of Honor
- Edward E. Rice, New York stage producer
- Fred Salvucci, former Massachusetts Secretary of Transportation
- Simon Shnapir, pair skater and Olympic medalist
- Ronald Speirs, US Army Officer portrayed in Band of Brothers (miniseries)
- Charles Richard Stith, former U.S. Ambassador to Tanzania
- Noah Welch, professional ice hockey player and 2018 US Olympic Team member
