= Maine's 5th congressional district =

Congressional district in Maine

- Obsolete district
- Created: 1821
- Eliminated: 1883
- Years active: 1821-1883

Maine's 5th congressional district was a congressional district in Maine. It was created in 1821 after Maine achieved statehood in 1820. It was eliminated in 1883. Its last congressman was Thompson Henry Murch.

== List of members representing the district ==
Member	Party	Years ↑	Cong ress	Electoral history	District location
District created March 4, 1821
Ebenezer Herrick (Bowdoinham)	Democratic-Republican	March 4, 1821 – March 3, 1823	17th	Elected in 1821. Redistricted to the 3rd district.	1821 – 1823; Kennebec County (partial) and Lincoln County (partial)
Enoch Lincoln (Paris)	Democratic-Republican	March 4, 1823 – March 3, 1825	18th 19th	Redistricted from the 7th district and re-elected in 1823. Re-elected in 1824. Resigned.	1823 – 1833; Cumberland County (partial), Kennebec County (partial), Lincoln County (partial), Oxford County (partial)
Enoch Lincoln (Paris)	Anti-Jacksonian	March 4, 1825 – January 1826	18th 19th	Redistricted from the 7th district and re-elected in 1823. Re-elected in 1824. Resigned.	1823 – 1833; Cumberland County (partial), Kennebec County (partial), Lincoln County (partial), Oxford County (partial)
Vacant		January 1826 – September 11, 1826	19th		1823 – 1833; Cumberland County (partial), Kennebec County (partial), Lincoln County (partial), Oxford County (partial)
James W. Ripley (Fryeburg)	Jacksonian	September 11, 1826 – March 12, 1830	19th 20th 21st	Elected September 11, 1826 to finish Lincoln's term and seated December 4, 1826. Re-elected in 1826. Re-elected in 1828 on the second ballot. Resigned.	1823 – 1833; Cumberland County (partial), Kennebec County (partial), Lincoln County (partial), Oxford County (partial)
Vacant		March 12, 1830 – December 6, 1830	21st		1823 – 1833; Cumberland County (partial), Kennebec County (partial), Lincoln County (partial), Oxford County (partial)
Cornelius Holland (Canton)	Jacksonian	December 6, 1830 – March 3, 1833	21st 22nd	Elected to finish Ripley's term. Also elected to the next full term. Retired.	1823 – 1833; Cumberland County (partial), Kennebec County (partial), Lincoln County (partial), Oxford County (partial)
Moses Mason Jr. (Bethel)	Jacksonian	March 4, 1833 – March 3, 1837	23rd 24th	Elected in 1833. Re-elected in 1834. Retired.	
Timothy J. Carter (Paris)	Democratic	March 4, 1837 – March 14, 1838	25th	Elected in 1836. Died.	
Vacant		March 14, 1838 – May 29, 1838	25th		
Virgil D. Parris (Buckfield)	Democratic	May 29, 1838 – March 3, 1841	25th 26th	Elected to finish Carter's term. Also elected to the next full term. Lost renomination.	
Nathaniel Littlefield (Bridgeton)	Democratic	March 4, 1841 – March 3, 1843	27th	Elected in 1840. Retired.	
Benjamin White (Montville)	Democratic	March 4, 1843 – March 3, 1845	28th	Elected in 1843. Retired.	
Cullen Sawtelle (Norridgewock)	Democratic	March 4, 1845 – March 3, 1847	29th	Elected in 1844. Retired.	
Ephraim K. Smart (Camden)	Democratic	March 4, 1847 – March 3, 1849	30th	Elected in 1846. Retired.	
Cullen Sawtelle (Norridgewock)	Democratic	March 4, 1849 – March 3, 1851	31st	Elected in 1848. Retired.	
Ephraim K. Smart (Camden)	Democratic	March 4, 1851 – March 3, 1853	32nd	Elected in 1850. Lost re-election.	
Israel Washburn Jr. (Orono)	Whig	March 4, 1853 – March 3, 1855	33rd 34th 35th 36th	Redistricted from the 6th district and re-elected in 1852. Re-elected in 1854. Re-elected in 1856. Re-elected in 1858. Retired to run for governor and resigned when elected.	
Israel Washburn Jr. (Orono)	Republican	March 4, 1855 – January 1, 1861	33rd 34th 35th 36th	Redistricted from the 6th district and re-elected in 1852. Re-elected in 1854. Re-elected in 1856. Re-elected in 1858. Retired to run for governor and resigned when elected.	
Vacant		January 1, 1861 – January 2, 1861	36th		
Stephen Coburn (Skowhegan)	Republican	January 2, 1861 – March 3, 1861	36th	Elected to finish Washburn's term. Retired.	
John H. Rice (Foxcroft)	Republican	March 4, 1861 – March 3, 1863	37th	Elected in 1860. Redistricted to the 4th district.	
Frederick A. Pike (Calais)	Republican	March 4, 1863 – March 3, 1869	38th 39th 40th	Redistricted from the 6th district and re-elected in 1862. Re-elected in 1864. Re-elected in 1866. Lost renomination.	
Eugene Hale (Ellsworth)	Republican	March 4, 1869 – March 3, 1879	41st 42nd 43rd 44th 45th	Elected in 1868. Re-elected in 1870. Re-elected in 1872. Re-elected in 1874. Re-elected in 1876. Lost re-election.	
Thompson Henry Murch (Rockland)	Greenback	March 4, 1879 – March 3, 1883	46th 47th	Elected in 1878. Re-elected in 1880. Redistricted to the at-large district and lost re-election.	
District eliminated March 3, 1883
