= Cornelius Holland (politician) =

American politician (1783–1870)

Member of the U.S. House of Representatives from Maine's 5th district
- In office December 6, 1830 – March 3, 1833
- Preceded by: James W. Ripley
- Succeeded by: Moses Mason Jr.

Personal details
- Born: July 9, 1783 Sutton, Massachusetts
- Died: June 2, 1870 (aged 86) Canton Point, Maine
- Party: Jacksonian
- Occupation: Physician

Cornelius Holland (July 9, 1783 – June 2, 1870) was a United States representative from Maine. He was born in Sutton, Massachusetts on July 9, 1783. He attended the common schools, studied medicine and commenced practice in Livermore, Maine in 1814.

He moved to Canton, Maine in 1815. He also engaged in agricultural pursuits there. He was elected as a delegate to the Maine constitutional convention in 1819. He was elected as a member of the Maine house of representatives in 1821 and 1822. He served in the Maine State senate in 1822, 1825, and 1826. He was a justice of the peace 1826-1855 and was elected as a Jacksonian to the Twenty-first Congress to fill the vacancy caused by the resignation of James W. Ripley. He was reelected to the Twenty-second Congress and served from December 6, 1830, to March 3, 1833.

He resumed the practice of medicine and reengaged in agricultural pursuits upon his return home. He died in Canton Point on June 2, 1870. His interment is in Hillside Cemetery.

U.S. House of Representatives
Preceded by James W. Ripley	Member of the U.S. House of Representatives from Maine's 5th congressional district 1830–1833	Succeeded by Moses Mason Jr.
