= Norridgewock, Maine =

- Town
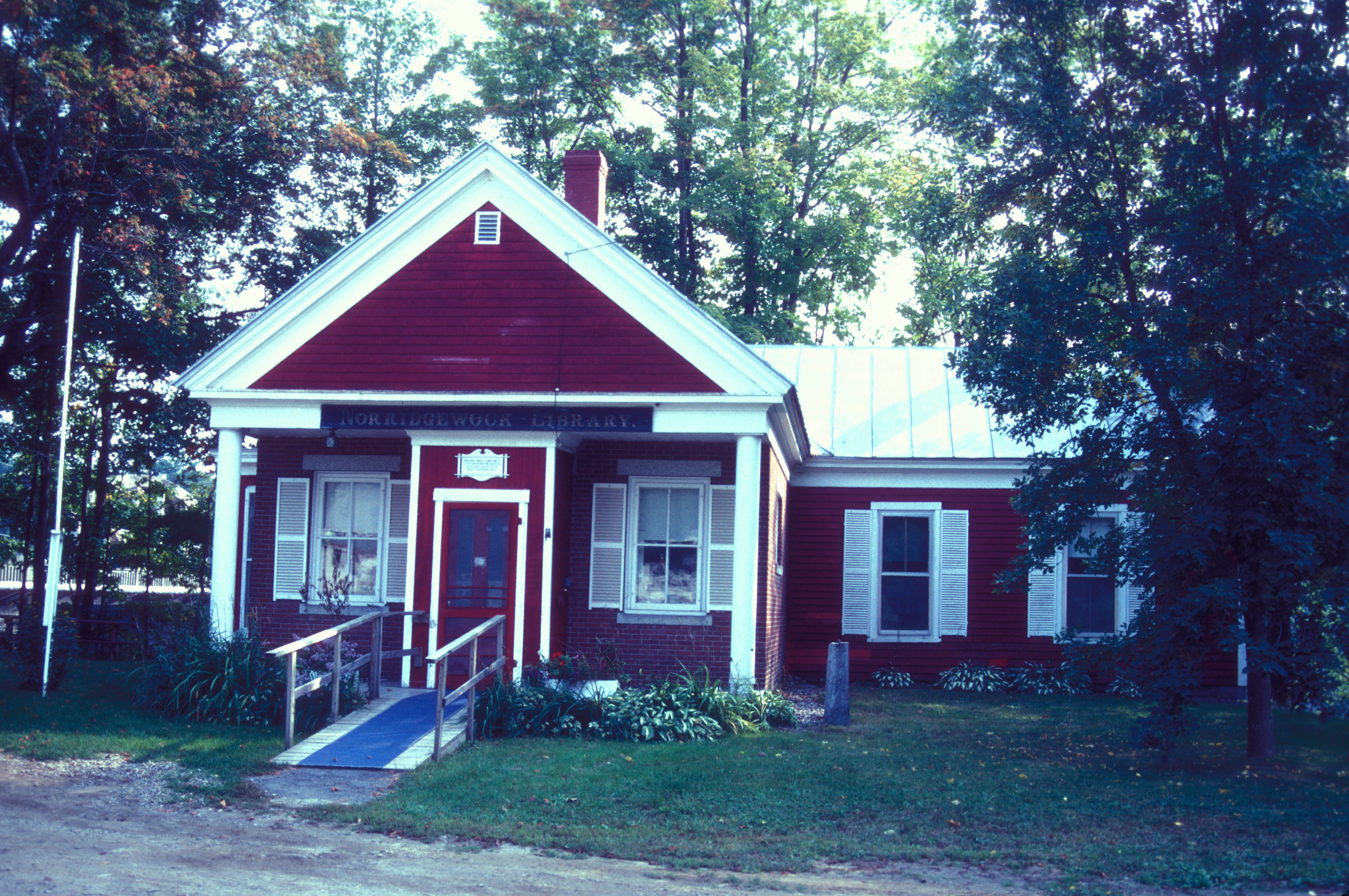
- Old Norridgewock Library

- Seal
- Interactive map of Norridgewock, Maine
- Coordinates: 44°43′36″N 69°48′32″W
- Country: United States
- State: Maine
- County: Somerset

Area
  - Total: 51.21 sq mi (132.63 km^{2})
  - Land: 49.95 sq mi (129.37 km^{2})
  - Water: 1.26 sq mi (3.26 km^{2})
- Elevation: 210 ft (64 m)

Population (2020)
  - Total: 3,278
  - Density: 66/sq mi (25.3/km^{2})
- Time zone: UTC-5 (Eastern (EST))
  - Summer (DST): UTC-4 (EDT)
- ZIP Code: 04957
- GNIS feature ID: 579026
- Website: www.norridgewock.gov

Norridgewock is a town in Somerset County, Maine, United States. The population was 3,278 at the 2020 census. It contains the census-designated place of the same name.

== History ==
=== Native Americans ===
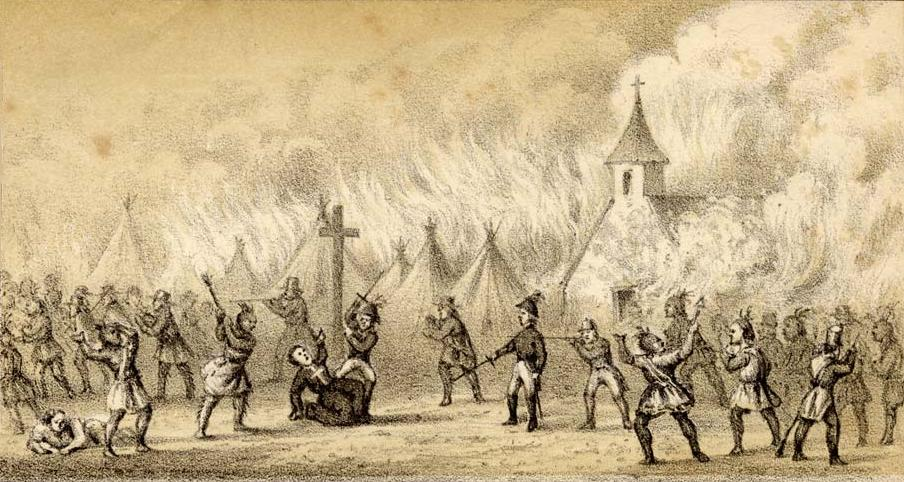
Battle of Norridgewock

Situated on the New England and Acadia border, which New France defined as the Kennebec River, the area was once territory of the Norridgewock Indians, a band of the Abenaki nation. Their village was located at Old Point, now part of Madison.

English colonists suspected Father Sebastien Rale (or Rasle), the French missionary at the village since 1694, of abetting tribal hostilities against British settlements during the French and Indian Wars. During Father Rale's War, soldiers left Fort Richmond (now Richmond) in whaleboats until they reached Taconic Falls (now Winslow), then marched quietly to Norridgewock Village, arriving on August 23, 1724. Battle of Norridgewock was "sharp, short and decisive," leaving 26 warriors slain, 14 wounded and 150 survivors fleeing to Quebec, Canada. Father Rale was among the dead.

=== Subsequent history ===
The British settled the area in 1773, then called Norridgewock Plantation. In 1775, Benedict Arnold and his troops marched through on their way to the Battle of Quebec.

The town was incorporated on June 18, 1788. It became county seat of Somerset County in 1809, with a courthouse built in 1820 and remodeled in 1847, although the county seat would be moved to Skowhegan in 1871. Wooden logs were floated down the Kennebec River. A sawmill was built to manufacture the region's abundant hardwoods, used in local factories to make carriages and furniture. Norridgewock also had a gristmill and granite works. Built in 1849 and replaced in 1929, the 600-foot (180 m) Norridgewock Covered Bridge across the Kennebec River was the second longest covered bridge in Maine after the 792-foot (241 m) Bangor Covered Bridge, which was built in 1846 across the Penobscot River to Brewer. The Eaton School was organized by Hamlin F. Eaton in 1856 and incorporated in 1874 " ... for the promotion of literature, science and morality." Its Second Empire building, designed by architect Charles F. Douglas of Lewiston, later became Somerset Grange #18. In 1988, it was listed on the National Register of Historic Places.

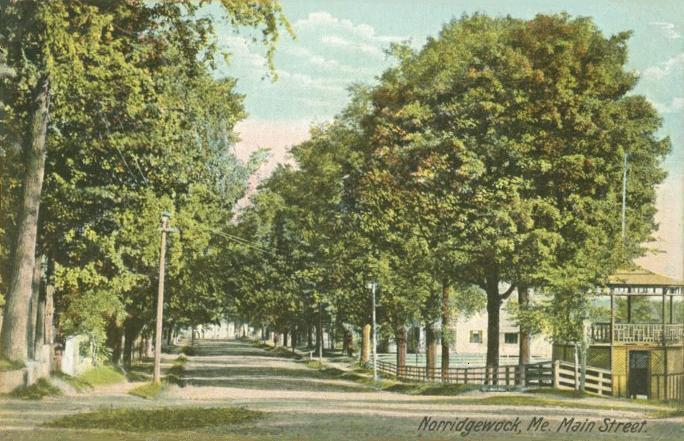
Main Street in 1904

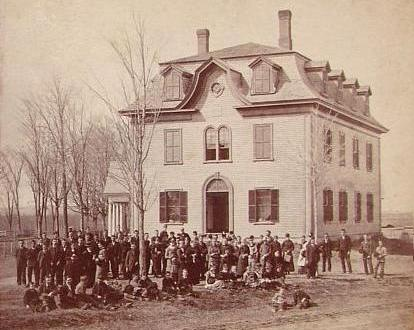
Eaton School c. 1880

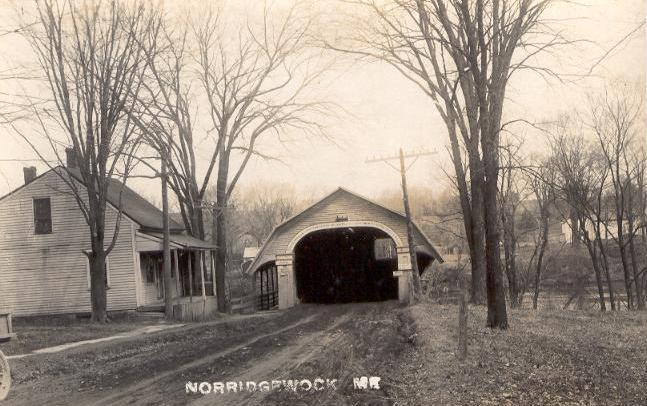
Covered bridge c. 1912

== Geography ==
According to the United States Census Bureau, the town has a total area of 51.21 square miles (132.63 km^{2}), of which 49.95 square miles (129.37 km^{2}) is land and 1.26 square miles (3.26 km^{2}) is water. Norridgewock is drained by the Sandy River, Mill Stream and Kennebec River.

The village is located at the junction of U.S. Routes 2 and 201A with Maine State routes 8 and 139. Norridgewock borders the towns of Madison to the north, Skowhegan to the east, Fairfield and Smithfield to the south, and Mercer and Starks to the west.

== Demographics ==
Historical population
Census	Pop.	Note	%±
1790	333		—
1800	633		90.1%
1810	880		39.0%
1820	1,454		65.2%
1830	1,710		17.6%
1840	1,865		9.1%
1850	1,848		−0.9%
1860	714		−61.4%
1870	1,756		145.9%
1880	1,491		−15.1%
1890	1,656		11.1%
1900	1,495		−9.7%
1910	1,608		7.6%
1920	1,532		−4.7%
1930	1,481		−3.3%
1940	1,511		2.0%
1950	1,784		18.1%
1960	1,634		−8.4%
1970	1,964		20.2%
1980	2,552		29.9%
1990	3,105		21.7%
2000	3,294		6.1%
2010	3,367		2.2%
2020	3,278		−2.6%
U.S. Decennial Census

=== 2010 census ===
As of the census of 2010, there were 3,367 people, 1,378 households, and 984 families living in the town. The population density was 67.4 inhabitants per square mile (26.0/km^{2}). There were 1,520 housing units at an average density of 30.4 per square mile (11.7/km^{2}). The racial makeup of the town was 97.2% White, 0.5% African American, 0.3% Native American, 0.2% Asian, 0.2% from other races, and 1.6% from two or more races. Hispanic or Latino of any race were 0.5% of the population.

There were 1,378 households, of which 30.3% had children under the age of 18 living with them, 55.5% were married couples living together, 10.1% had a female householder with no husband present, 5.8% had a male householder with no wife present, and 28.6% were non-families. 21.8% of all households were made up of individuals, and 7.9% had someone living alone who was 65 years of age or older. The average household size was 2.44 and the average family size was 2.78.

The median age in the town was 42.7 years. 22.3% of residents were under the age of 18; 7.2% were between the ages of 18 and 24; 24.4% were from 25 to 44; 31% were from 45 to 64; and 15.1% were 65 years of age or older. The gender makeup of the town was 50.0% male and 50.0% female.

=== 2000 census ===
As of the census of 2000, there were 3,294 people, 1,285 households, and 953 families living in the town. The population density was 66.1 inhabitants per square mile (25.5/km^{2}). There were 1,389 housing units at an average density of 27.9 per square mile (10.8/km^{2}). The racial makeup of the town was 98.36% White, 0.30% Black or African American, 0.46% Native American, 0.12% Asian, 0.18% from other races, and 0.58% from two or more races. Hispanic or Latino of any race were 0.36% of the population.

There were 1,285 households, out of which 35.8% had children under the age of 18 living with them, 60.6% were married couples living together, 9.1% had a female householder with no husband present, and 25.8% were non-families. 18.8% of all households were made up of individuals, and 8.2% had someone living alone who was 65 years of age or older. The average household size was 2.56 and the average family size was 2.90.

In the town, the population was spread out, with 26.3% under the age of 18, 6.3% from 18 to 24, 30.1% from 25 to 44, 25.7% from 45 to 64, and 11.5% who were 65 years of age or older. The median age was 38 years. For every 100 females, there were 97.5 males. For every 100 females age 18 and over, there were 94.9 males.

The median income for a household in the town was $35,679, and the median income for a family was $41,536. Males had a median income of $31,800 versus $20,508 for females. The per capita income for the town was $17,325. About 15.1% of families and 16.3% of the population were below the poverty line, including 24.4% of those under age 18 and 12.2% of those age 65 or over.

== Incidents ==
On April 25, 2018, John Williams shot and killed Cpl. Eugene Cole while in the process of being arrested.

== Sites of interest ==
- Norridgewock Historical Society & Museum
- Everett's Tire
- Millstream Elementary School
- Sophie May House

== Notable people ==
- Nathan Abbott, legal scholar, professor
- Daniel W. Ames, state legislator
- Rebecca Sophia Clarke (Sophie May), children's author
- Nathan Haskell Dole, editor, translator, author
- Stephen D. Lindsey, US congressman
- Sebastien Rale (or Rasle), Jesuit missionary
- Minot Judson Savage, minister
- Charles G. Sawtelle, U.S. Army brigadier general
- Cullen Sawtelle, US congressman
- Franklin J. Sawtelle, architect
- Niran Withee, Wisconsin businessman and politician
