= Phinehas Barnes =

American politician

Phineas Barnes
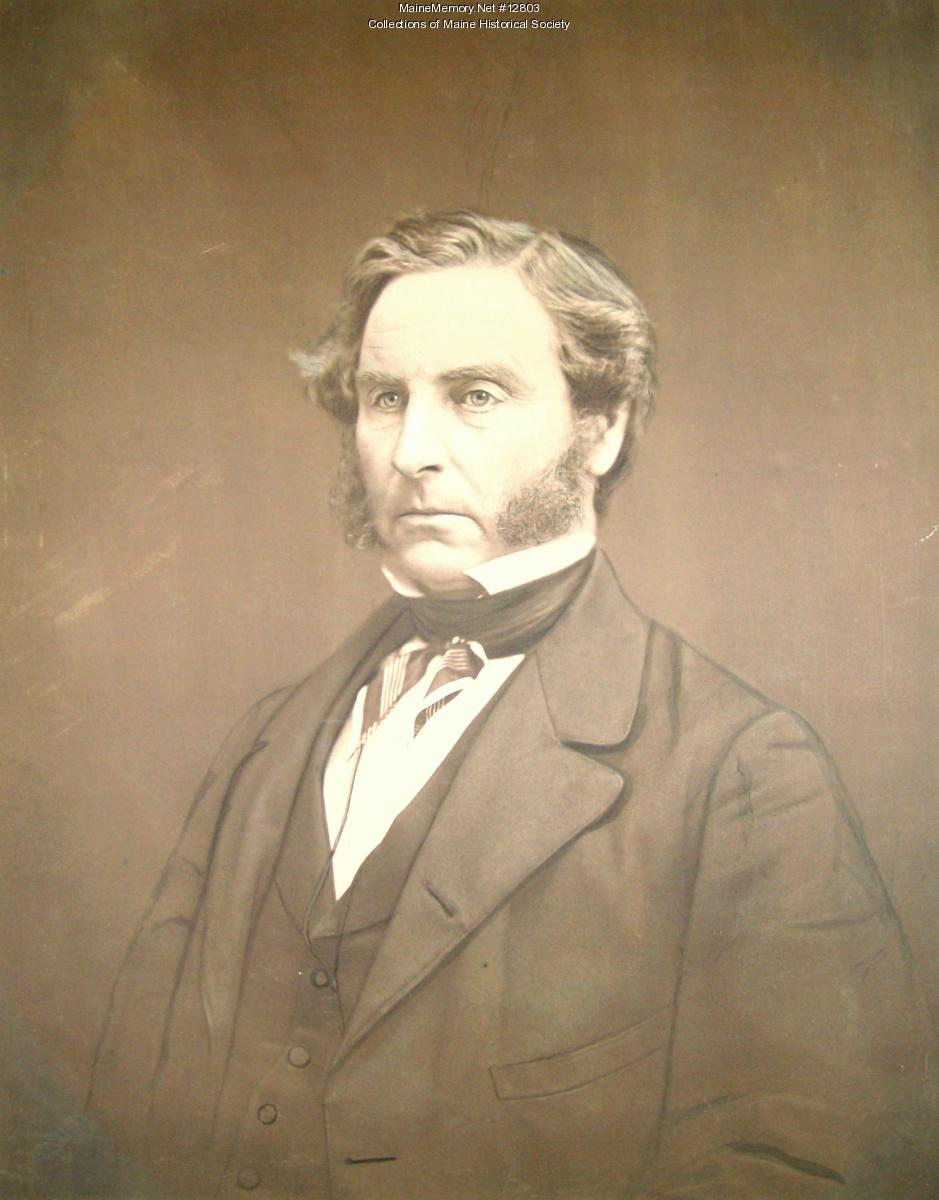
- Phinehas Barnes (1863)
- Born: 21 January 1811; Orland, Maine, United States
- Died: 21 August 1871 (aged 60); Portland, Maine, United States
- Occupations: lawyer, newspaper editor, politician

Phineas Barnes (21 January 1811 – 21 August 1871) was an American lawyer, newspaper editor, and politician from Maine.

== Early life and education ==
Barnes was born on 21 January 1811 in Orland, Maine. He prepared for college at Phillips Academy before attending Bowdoin College, graduating in 1830.

== Career ==
He was a clerk in a bookstore, edited a paper in Bangor, Maine, and taught at Waterville College, occupying the chair of Greek and Latin from 1834-1839.

He studied law and eventually moved to Portland. He also edited the Whig-leaning newspaper the Portland Advertiser and worked as an attorney for a number of years and represented among other companies the Grand Trunk Railway. He also served as a trustee of the Maine General Hospital and the state agricultural college. He was an overseer of Bowdoin College and was a director of the Portland Savings Bank.

He was elected to five single-year terms in the Maine House of Representatives (1844 – 1846; 1848; 1856). In 1860, he was nominated by the Whigs on the Constitutional Union ticket for the governor of Maine, but was not elected.

== Death ==
Barnes died in Portland on 21 August 1871, and was buried at Portland's Evergreen Cemetery.

== Personal life ==
Barnes married Anne Judson Butler on 20 August 1837 in North Yarmouth, Maine. Between 1838 and 1854, the couple had eight children. His daughter, Clara Barnes Martin, wrote the popular guidebook Mount Desert on the Coast of Maine (1867), an early guidebook to an area of what is now Acadia National Park in Maine.
