= List of public art in Portland, Maine =

This is a list of public art in Portland, Maine, in the United States. This list applies only to works of public art on permanent display in an outdoor public space. For example, this does not include artworks in museums. Public art may include sculptures, statues, monuments, memorials, murals, and mosaics.

Image	Title / subject	Location and coordinates	Date	Artist / designer	Type	Material	Dimensions	Designation	Owner / administrator	Wikidata	Notes
More images	Henry Wadsworth Longfellow Monument	West End 43°39′11″N 70°16′2″W	1888	Franklin Simmons; Francis H. Fassett	Statue	Bronze and granite					
More images	Soldiers' and Sailors' Monument	Monument Square 43.65736°N 70.2589°W	1891	Franklin Simmons; Richard Morris Hunt	Statue	Bronze and granite					
	Pullen Fountain	43°39′33″N 70°15′19″W		George Burnham	Fountain	Granite					
	Statue of Thomas Brackett Reed	Western Promenade 43°39′0″N 70°16′35″W	1910	Burr Churchill Miller	Statue	Bronze and granite					
