= Joseph Manley =

Joseph Manley may refer to:

- Joey Manley (1965–2013), American LGBT author
- Joseph Homan Manley (1842–1905), American Republican Party official
- Joe Manley (born 1959), American boxer
