= Joseph and Susan Manley Summer Cottage =

Historic house in Maine, United States

- U.S. National Register of Historic Places
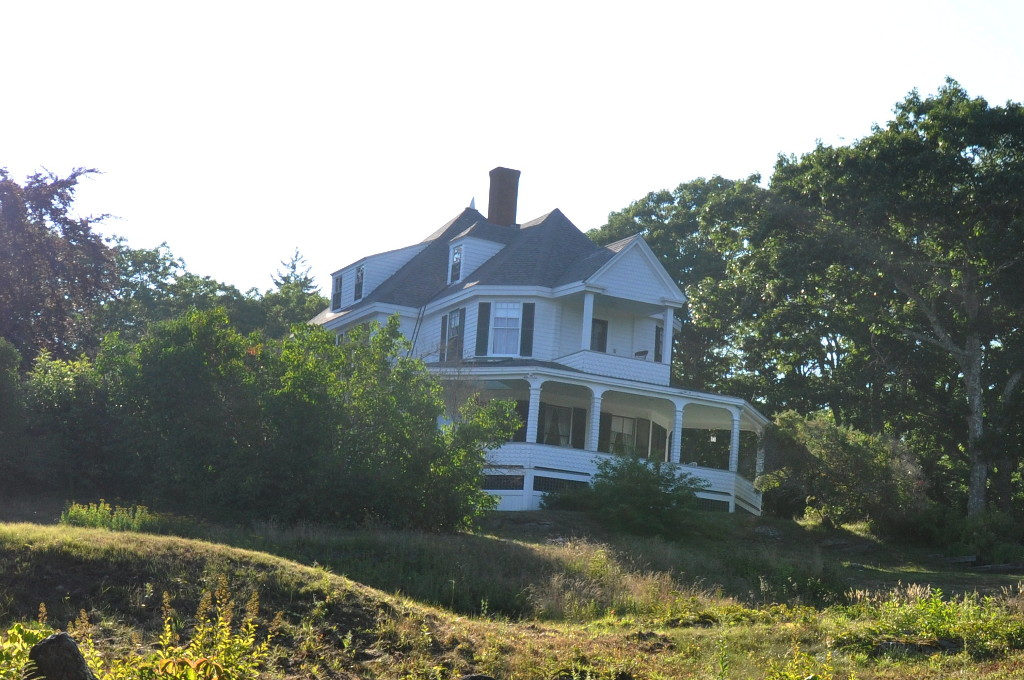

- Location within Maine Location within the United States
- Location: E side of Club Rd., 0.1 mi. S of jct. of ME 216 and Club Rd., Small Point, Maine
- Coordinates: 43°43′24″N 69°50′14″W
- Area: 1 acre (0.40 ha)
- Built: 1887
- Architect: Coombs, George M.
- Architectural style: Queen Anne
- NRHP reference No.: 97001642
- Added to NRHP: January 7, 1998

The Joseph and Susan Manley Summer Cottage is a historic house on Club Road in the Small Point area of Phippsburg, Maine. Built in 1887, it is one of the largest and most elaborate summer houses in the community, and is a fine Queen Anne structure designed by a prominent Maine architect. It was built for Joseph Homan Manley, a prominent Maine political operative, and was listed on the National Register of Historic Places in 1998.

== Description and history ==
The Manley Summer Cottage is located on the east side of Club Road, a spur road leading to the shore on the Small Point peninsula, the southernmost tip of Phippsburg. It is a 2 1/2-story wood-frame structure, with a hip roof, clapboard siding, and a foundation of brick and stone. It is T-shaped, with the leg of the T surrounded by a wraparound porch. The porch's supporting posts and balustrade are clad in wooden shingles, and there is a small second-story porch on the main facade's central bay.

The house was designed by Lewiston architect George M. Coombs, one of the state's most prolific and successful architects of the late 19th century. It was built in 1887 for Joseph Homan Manley and his wife Susan, who was the daughter of former Maine Governor Samuel Cony. It was built next to the summer house of Joseph Bodwell, then the Governor of Maine. Manley was a successful businessman, and an active member of the state's Republican Party inner circle. He served from 1894 to 1896 as chairman of the Republican National Committee. At the time of its listing on the National Register in 1998, the house was still in the hands of Manley's descendants.

== See also ==
- National Register of Historic Places listings in Sagadahoc County, Maine
