= Statue of Thomas Brackett Reed =

Statue in Portland, Maine

Thomas Brackett Reed
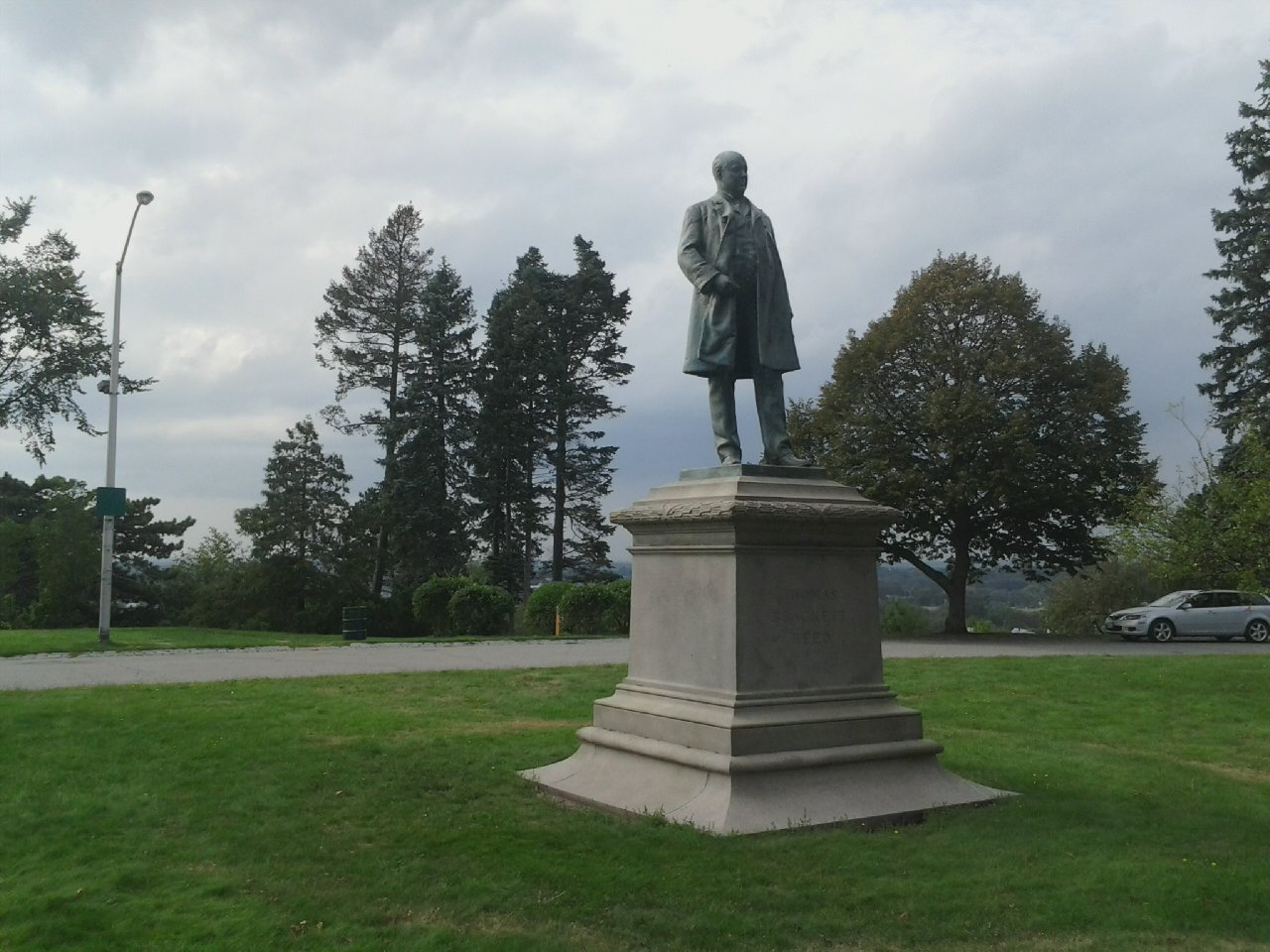
- The statue in 2011
- Interactive map of Thomas Brackett Reed
- Location: Western Promenade, Portland, Maine, United States
- Coordinates: 43°39′0″N 70°16′35″W
- Designer: Burr Churchill Miller
- Builder: Massachusetts Monumental Company (contractors); Sheidow Bronze Corporation (foundry)
- Type: Statue
- Material: Bronze; Granite (pedestal)
- Length: 8 feet (2.4 m)
- Width: 10 feet (3.0 m)
- Height: 20 feet (6.1 m) _{Pedestal: 10 feet (3.0 m); Statue: 10 feet (3.0 m)}
- Completion date: 1908
- Dedicated date: August 31, 1910
- Dedicated to: Thomas Brackett Reed

Thomas Brackett Reed is a monumental statue located on the Western Promenade in Portland, Maine, United States. Dedicated in 1910, the statue was designed by sculptor Burr Churchill Miller and honors Thomas Brackett Reed, a politician from Maine who served for several years as the speaker of the United States House of Representatives.

== Background ==
=== Erection ===
Thomas Brackett Reed was born in Portland, Maine in 1839. He became a politician and served as a Republican member of the U.S. House of Representatives from 1877 to 1899. For several years he served as the speaker of the House. Reed was a divisive figure during this time, as he significantly increased the power of the office of the speaker, leading to some critics labeling him a "czar". He died in 1902.

On April 4, 1905, the Portland, Maine City Council approved a resolution calling for the erection of a monument in Reed's honor. The city council formed a committee to oversee the resolution's execution and on May 19, 1905, several prominent Portland citizen joined this group and formed the Thomas Brackett Reed Memorial Association. This association was officially chartered by the Maine Legislature on March 20, 1907, with Joseph W. Symonds as its president. On August 5 of that year, Portland's government set aside a plot of land for the monument to stand on, located on the Western Promenade near where Reed had grown up. Meanwhile, the association continued their fundraising efforts, with a significant contribution coming from Augustus G. Paine Sr., and on May 8, 1908, the association signed a contract with American sculptor Burr Churchill Miller to create a statue based on a design he had previously submitted. The statue was cast that year at the sculptor's studio in Paris, with the total cost of the project being around $35,000 or $40,000. The Massachusetts Monument Company served as the contractors for the monument. Prior to the statue being transported to Maine, it was exhibited at the Paris Salon.

=== Dedication ===
The monument's dedication ceremony was held on August 31, 1910. The events began with Chandler's Band playing "American Overture" and was followed by an invocation given by the Reverend William H. Fenn. Two addresses were then given by Paine and Symonds, after which the band played the "Pilgrim" chorus from the opera Tannhäuser. Initially, the dedication ceremony was to continue outside, but inclement weather caused some festivities to be moved in-doors. As a result, the statue was officially unveiled following Symonds' speech by Reed's daughter Katherine Reed Balentine and his infant grandson Thomas Reed Balentine. Miller was then introduced to the crowd by Symonds, who gave congratulatory words to the sculptor. The monument was then ceremonially given by Symonds to the mayor of Portland, who accepted the gift on behalf of the city. After the ceremony was moved in-doors to the nearby State Street Church, a poem was read by the Reverend Edward N. Pomeroy (a childhood friend of Reed's) and U.S. Representative Samuel W. McCall, the orator for the dedication, gave a speech about Reed. The ceremonies were then concluded with a benediction given by the Reverend Asa Dalton.

In 1989, a dedicatory plaque was added to the monument. The Sheidow Bronze Corporation was responsible for casting the plaque, which was donated to the city by two individuals. In 1994, the monument was surveyed as part of the Save Outdoor Sculpture! project.

== Design ==
The monument consists of a bronze statue standing upon a pedestal made of Red Beach Maine granite. Sources differ on the exact dimensions of the monument, with the Smithsonian Institution Research Information System giving the statue's height as 10 feet (3.0 m), while the pedestal stands 10 feet (3.0 m) and has side lengths of 8 feet (2.4 m) and 10 feet (3.0 m). (Note: Contemporary sources from around the time of the monument's dedication give the statue a height of 10.5 feet (3.2 m), while Public Art Portland gives the statue's height as 8 feet (2.4 m) and the pedestal's height as 9 feet (2.7 m).) Reed is wearing a suit underneath a vest and knee-length coat and holds a scroll in his left hand, while his right hand is raised near his hip. The front of the pedestal bears Reed's full name, while a plaque on the back of the pedestal bears the following inscription: THOMAS BRACKETT "CZAR" REED / STATESMAN AND MAN OF CONSCIENCE / 1839–1902 / PORTLAND NATIVE / BOWDOIN COLLEGE - CLASS OF 1860 / CIVIL WAR VETERAN / MAINE HOUSE OF REPRESENTATIVES 1868–1869 / ATTORNEY GENERAL OF MAINE 1870–1872 / UNITED STATES HOUSE OF REPRESENTATIVE 1877–1899 / SPEAKER OF THE UNITED STATES HOUSE OF REPRESENTATIVES 1889–1891 AND 1895–1899.

== Sources ==
- Exercises at the Unveiling of the Statue of Thomas Brackett Reed, at Portland, Maine, August Thirty-First, Nineteen Hundred and Ten. Thomas Brackett Reed Memorial Association. Stephen Berry Company. 1910.
