= List of United States Supreme Court cases, volume 144 =

Supreme Court of the United States
- Interactive map of Supreme Court of the United States
- 38°53′26″N 77°00′16″W
- Established: March 4, 1789; 236 years ago
- Location: Washington, D.C.
- Coordinates: 38°53′26″N 77°00′16″W
- Composition method: Presidential nomination with Senate confirmation
- Authorised by: Constitution of the United States, Art. III, § 1
- Judge term length: life tenure, subject to impeachment and removal
- Number of positions: 9 (by statute)
- Website: supremecourt.gov

This is a list of cases reported in volume 144 of United States Reports, decided by the Supreme Court of the United States in 1892.

== Justices of the Supreme Court at the time of volume 144 U.S. ==
The Supreme Court is established by Article III, Section 1 of the Constitution of the United States, which says: "The judicial Power of the United States, shall be vested in one supreme Court . . .". The size of the Court is not specified; the Constitution leaves it to Congress to set the number of justices. Under the Judiciary Act of 1789 Congress originally fixed the number of justices at six (one chief justice and five associate justices). Since 1789 Congress has varied the size of the Court from six to seven, nine, ten, and back to nine justices (always including one chief justice).

When the cases in volume 144 U.S. were decided the Court comprised the following eight members (Justice Joseph P. Bradley had died in January 1892):

Portrait	Justice	Office	Home State	Succeeded	Date confirmed by the Senate (Vote)	Tenure on Supreme Court
	Melville Fuller	Chief Justice	Illinois	Morrison Waite	July 20, 1888 (41–20)	October 8, 1888 – July 4, 1910 (Died)
	Stephen Johnson Field	Associate Justice	California	newly created seat	March 10, 1863 (Acclamation)	May 10, 1863 – December 1, 1897 (Retired)
	John Marshall Harlan	Associate Justice	Kentucky	David Davis	November 29, 1877 (Acclamation)	December 10, 1877 – October 14, 1911 (Died)
	Horace Gray	Associate Justice	Massachusetts	Nathan Clifford	December 20, 1881 (51–5)	January 9, 1882 – September 15, 1902 (Died)
	Samuel Blatchford	Associate Justice	New York	Ward Hunt	March 22, 1882 (Acclamation)	April 3, 1882 – July 7, 1893 (Died)
	Lucius Quintus Cincinnatus Lamar	Associate Justice	Mississippi	William Burnham Woods	January 16, 1888 (32–28)	January 18, 1888 – January 23, 1893 (Died)
	David Josiah Brewer	Associate Justice	Kansas	Stanley Matthews	December 18, 1889 (53–11)	January 6, 1890 – March 28, 1910 (Died)
	Henry Billings Brown	Associate Justice	Michigan	Samuel Freeman Miller	December 29, 1890 (Acclamation)	January 5, 1891 – May 28, 1906 (Retired)

== Notable Cases in 144 U.S. ==
=== United States v. Ballin ===
United States v. Ballin, 144 U.S. 1 (1892), is a Supreme Court decision discussing the constitutional definition of "a quorum to do business" in Congress. The Court, analyzing the constitutional limitations on the United States Senate and House of Representatives when determining their rules of proceedings, held that it fell within the powers of the House and Senate to establish their own rules for verifying whether a majority of their members is present, as required for a quorum under Article I of the Constitution.

=== Lau Ow Bew v. United States ===
Lau Ow Bew v. United States, 144 U.S. 47 (1892), is a case occurring at the beginning of the era of Chinese Exclusion as well as the formation of the United States courts of appeals. The case set precedents for the interpretation of the rights of Chinese merchants and the jurisdiction of the new courts. The Supreme Court's ruling relied heavily the Burlingame Treaty of 1868, the Angell Treaty of 1880, the Chinese Exclusion Act of 1882 and the amendments to the Act in 1884, as well as the Evarts Act of 1891. The case helped to establish not only the rights of the Chinese merchant class, but also informed future cases about the power of the Circuit Courts of Appeal as well as the perception of Chinese immigrants.

== Citation style ==
Under the Judiciary Act of 1789 the federal court structure at the time comprised District Courts, which had general trial jurisdiction; Circuit Courts, which had mixed trial and appellate (from the US District Courts) jurisdiction; and the United States Supreme Court, which had appellate jurisdiction over the federal District and Circuit courts—and for certain issues over state courts. The Supreme Court also had limited original jurisdiction (i.e., in which cases could be filed directly with the Supreme Court without first having been heard by a lower federal or state court). There were one or more federal District Courts and/or Circuit Courts in each state, territory, or other geographical region.

The Judiciary Act of 1891 created the United States Courts of Appeals and reassigned the jurisdiction of most routine appeals from the district and circuit courts to these appellate courts. The Act created nine new courts that were originally known as the "United States Circuit Courts of Appeals." The new courts had jurisdiction over most appeals of lower court decisions. The Supreme Court could review either legal issues that a court of appeals certified or decisions of court of appeals by writ of certiorari.

Bluebook citation style is used for case names, citations, and jurisdictions.

- "# Cir." = United States Court of Appeals
  - e.g., "3d Cir." = United States Court of Appeals for the Third Circuit
- "C.C.D." = United States Circuit Court for the District of . . .
  - e.g.,"C.C.D.N.J." = United States Circuit Court for the District of New Jersey
- "D." = United States District Court for the District of . . .
  - e.g.,"D. Mass." = United States District Court for the District of Massachusetts
- "E." = Eastern; "M." = Middle; "N." = Northern; "S." = Southern; "W." = Western
  - e.g.,"C.C.S.D.N.Y." = United States Circuit Court for the Southern District of New York
  - e.g.,"M.D. Ala." = United States District Court for the Middle District of Alabama
- "Ct. Cl." = United States Court of Claims
- The abbreviation of a state's name alone indicates the highest appellate court in that state's judiciary at the time.
  - e.g.,"Pa." = Supreme Court of Pennsylvania
  - e.g.,"Me." = Supreme Judicial Court of Maine

== List of cases in volume 144 U.S. ==
Case Name	Page & year	Opinion of the Court	Concurring opinion(s)	Dissenting opinion(s)	Lower Court	Disposition
United States v. Ballin	1 (1892)	Brewer	none	none	C.C.S.D.N.Y.	reversed
Ansonia B. & C. Co. v. Electrical S. Co.	11 (1892)	Brown	none	none	C.C.D. Conn.	affirmed
Larkin v. Upton	19 (1892)	Brewer	none	none	Sup. Ct. Terr. Mont.	affirmed
United States v. Wilson	24 (1892)	Lamar	none	none	Ct. Cl.	affirmed
Heinze v. Arthur's Ex'rs	28 (1892)	Blatchford	none	none	C.C.S.D.N.Y.	reversed
Liebenroth v. Robertson	35 (1892)	Blatchford	none	none	C.C.S.D.N.Y.	reversed
Wilson v. Seligman	41 (1892)	Gray	none	none	C.C.E.D. Mo.	affirmed
Lau Ow Bew v. United States	47 (1892)	Fuller	none	none	9th Cir.	reversed
Butler v. National Home	64 (1892)	Harlan	none	Brown	C.C.D. Mass.	reversed
Kent v. Lake Superior et al. Co.	75 (1892)	Fuller	none	none	C.C.E.D.N.Y.	affirmed
In re Heath	92 (1892)	Fuller	none	none	Sup. Ct. D.C.	dismissed
Gordon v. Third Nat'l Bank	97 (1892)	Fuller	none	none	C.C.N.D. Ala.	affirmed
Camden v. Stuart	104 (1892)	Brown	none	none	C.C.D.W. Va.	affirmed
Lacassagne v. Chapuis	119 (1892)	Blatchford	none	none	C.C.W.D. La.	affirmed
Tripp v. Santa Rosa St. R.R. Co.	126 (1892)	Fuller	none	none	Cal.	dismissed
Haley v. Breeze	130 (1892)	Fuller	none	none	Colo.	dismissed
Southern K. Ry. Co. v. Briscoe	133 (1892)	Fuller	none	none	C.C.W.D. Ark.	affirmed
Dillman v. Hastings	136 (1892)	Fuller	none	none	C.C.N.D. Ohio	reversed
Bedon v. Davie	142 (1892)	Blatchford	none	none	C.C.D.S.C.	affirmed
United States v. Budd	154 (1892)	Brewer	none	Brown	C.C.D. Wash.	affirmed
City of Brenham v. German Am. Bank I	173 (1892)	Blatchford	none	Harlan	C.C.W.D. Tex.	reversed
Rice v. Sanger	197 (1892)	Fuller	none	none	Kan.	dismissed
Sherman v. Grinnell	198 (1892)	Fuller	none	none	New York City Ct.	dismissed
Columbia et al. R.R. Co. v. Hawthorne	202 (1892)	Gray	none	none	Sup. Ct. Terr. Wash.	reversed
Red River C. Co. v. Sully	209 (1892)	Fuller	none	none	C.C.N.D. Tex.	affirmed
Missouri ex rel. Quincy et al. R.R. Co. v. Harris	210 (1892)	Fuller	none	none	Mo.	dismissed
Glaspell v. Northern Pacific Railroad Co.	211 (1892)	Fuller	none	none	C.C.D.N.D.	reversed
Pope Mfg. Co. v. Gormully I	224 (1892)	Brown	none	none	C.C.N.D. Ill.	affirmed
Pope Mfg. Co. v. Gormully II	238 (1892)	Brown	none	none	C.C.N.D. Ill.	affirmed
Pope Mfg. Co. v. Gormully III	248 (1892)	Brown	none	none	C.C.N.D. Ill.	affirmed
Pope Mfg. Co. v. Gormully IV	254 (1892)	Brown	none	none	C.C.N.D. Ill.	affirmed
McLane v. King	260 (1892)	Brewer	none	none	C.C.W.D. Tex.	affirmed
Logan v. United States	263 (1892)	Gray	none	Lamar	C.C.N.D. Tex.	reversed
United States v. Sanges	310 (1892)	Gray	none	none	C.C.N.D. Ga.	dismissed
O'Neil v. Vermont	323 (1892)	Blatchford	none	Field	Vt.	dismissed
The Blue Jacket	371 (1892)	Blatchford	none	none	Sup. Ct. Terr. Wash.	affirmed
Waterman v. Banks	394 (1892)	Harlan	none	none	C.C.N.D. Cal.	reversed
Porter v. Banks	407 (1892)	per curiam	none	none	C.C.N.D. Cal.	reversed
Grand Trunk Ry. Co. v. Ives	408 (1892)	Lamar	none	none	C.C.E.D. Mich.	affirmed
Keator L. Co. v. Thompson	434 (1892)	Harlan	none	none	C.C.N.D. Ill.	affirmed
Hartford L.A. Ins. Co. v. Unsell	439 (1892)	Harlan	none	none	C.C.E.D. Mo.	affirmed
Dodge v. Tulleys	451 (1892)	Brewer	none	none	C.C.D. Neb.	affirmed
Northern Pacific Railroad v. Ellis	458 (1892)	Fuller	none	none	Wis.	dismissed
Northern Pacific Railroad v. Amato	465 (1892)	Blatchford	none	Brewer	2d Cir.	affirmed
Chateaugay O. & I. Co. v. Blake	476 (1892)	Brewer	none	none	C.C.S.D.N.Y.	affirmed
Belford v. Scribner	488 (1892)	Blatchford	none	none	C.C.N.D. Ill.	affirmed
Smith v. Gale	509 (1892)	Brown	none	none	Sup. Ct. Terr. Dakota	affirmed
Torrence v. Shedd	527 (1892)	Gray	none	none	C.C.N.D. Ill.	reversed
Sharon v. Tucker	533 (1892)	Field	none	none	Sup. Ct. D.C.	reversed
Stellwagen v. Tucker	548 (1892)	per curiam	none	none	Sup. Ct. D.C.	reversed
City of Brenham v. German Am. Bank II	549 (1892)	per curiam	none	none	C.C.W.D. Tex.	rehearing denied
Coosaw M. Co. v. South Carolina	550 (1892)	Harlan	none	none	C.C.D.S.C.	affirmed
Kellam v. Keith	568 (1892)	Fuller	none	none	C.C.D. Kan.	reversed
Macon Cnty.	568 (1892)	Fuller	none	none	C.C.E.D. Mo.	affirmed
National E. Bank v. Peters	570 (1892)	Fuller	none	none	C.C.E.D. Va.	dismissed
Brown v. Massachusetts	573 (1892)	Gray	none	none	Mass. Super. Ct.	dismissed
Windett v. Union M.L. Ins. Co.	581 (1892)	Gray	none	none	C.C.N.D. Ill.	affirmed
Crawford v. Neal	585 (1892)	Fuller	none	none	C.C.D. Or.	affirmed
Meyerheim v. Robertson	601 (1892)	Blatchford	none	none	C.C.S.D.N.Y.	affirmed
Robertson v. Salomon	603 (1892)	Blatchford	none	none	C.C.S.D.N.Y.	reversed
Nesbit v. Riverside Ind. Dist.	610 (1892)	Brewer	none	none	C.C.N.D. Iowa	affirmed
Crotty v. Union M.L. Ins. Co.	621 (1892)	Brewer	none	none	C.C.N.D. Cal.	affirmed
White v. Rankin	628 (1892)	Blatchford	none	none	C.C.N.D. Cal.	reversed
Pendleton v. Russell	640 (1892)	Field	none	none	N.Y. Sup. Ct.	affirmed
Sage v. Louisiana Bd. of Liquidation	647 (1892)	Field	none	none	La.	dismissed
Adams v. Louisiana Bd. of Liquidation	651 (1892)	Field	none	none	La.	dismissed
Roberts v. Lewis	653 (1892)	Gray	none	none	C.C.D. Neb.	reversed
Kendall v. San Juan S.M. Co.	658 (1892)	Field	none	none	Colo.	affirmed
Gregory v. Boston S.D. & T. Co.	665 (1892)	Harlan	none	none	C.C.D. Mass.	decree modified
Underwood v. Metropolitan Nat'l Bank	669 (1892)	Blatchford	none	none	C.C.W.D. Mo.	affirmed
United States v. Eaton	677 (1892)	Blatchford	none	none	C.C.D. Mass.	certification
