= United States v. Ballin =

- Supreme Court of the United States

Argued December 2, 1891 Decided February 29, 1892
- Full case name: United States v. Ballin, Joseph & Co.
- Citations: 144 U.S. 1 (more) 12 S. Ct. 507; 36 L. Ed. 321; 1892 U.S. LEXIS 2047

Case history
- Prior: Collector of New York classified certain imported worsteds as manufactures of wool and assessed duty under 22 Stat. 508 488, 508, c.121; upheld, Board of General Appraisers; reversed, Circuit Court, Southern District of New York (45 F 170 (CCSDNY 1891)).

Holding
- When quorum is present, votes of majority of quorum are sufficient to pass a bill.

Court membership
- Chief Justice Melville Fuller Associate Justices Stephen J. Field · John M. Harlan; Horace Gray · Samuel Blatchford; Lucius Q. C. Lamar II · David J. Brewer; Henry B. Brown

Case opinion
- Majority: Brewer, joined by a unanimous court

Laws applied
- U.S. Const. Art. I, §5

United States v. Ballin, 144 U.S. 1 (1892), is a decision issued on February 29, 1892 by the United States Supreme Court, discussing the constitutional definition of "a quorum to do business" in Congress. Justice David Brewer delivered the opinion of the unanimous Court, analyzing the constitutional limitations on the United States Senate and House of Representatives when determining their rules of proceedings. In particular, the Court held that it fell within the powers of the House and Senate to establish their own rules for verifying whether a majority of their members is present, as required for a quorum under Article I of the Constitution.

The case was brought after the Board of General Appraisers affirmed the decision of the Collector of New York to classify imported worsted cloth as woolens, thus subjecting them to a higher rate of customs duty. The importers challenged the validity of the law authorizing the duty increase, alleging that a quorum was not present when the law was passed. On appeal, the Circuit Court for the Southern District of New York sustained the importers' claim and reversed the Board's decision. The United States appealed to the Supreme Court, which reversed the Circuit Court's judgment and upheld the Board's decision. The decision established unambiguously that when a quorum is present, approval by a majority of that quorum is sufficient for the House or Senate to pass a bill.

== Background ==
In its first 100 years, the United States House of Representatives did not pass legislation unless a full quorum of the House approved the bill. Those present, but not voting, could block votes and prevent a quorum—the technique of the disappearing quorum. The practice was terminated in February 1890, with the adoption of a new set of House rules. In particular, Rule XV (passed on February 14, 1890) established that a quorum is satisfied if a majority of members are present, even if they withhold their votes on a particular bill.

On March 1, 1888, the Ways and Means Committee of the House had started review of the McKinley Tariff bill, which would eventually pass the House on May 21, 1890. One part of the bill, drafted by Nelson Dingley, Jr. and known as the Worsted act, would "authorize and direct the Secretary of the Treasury to classify as woolen cloths all imports of worsted cloth," in order to levy a higher rate of customs duty. The Worsted act came up for vote on May 9, 1890, garnering 138 yeas and 3 nays. House Speaker Thomas B. Reed requested a roll call, and 74 representatives were recorded by the clerk in the House Journal as being present and refusing to vote. The speaker concluded that those voting, together with the 74 members withholding their votes (in total more than 166 representatives), constituted a quorum present to do business. The House at the time comprised 330 seats. Since 138 yeas were more than one-half of the members present and voting (141 total voting, 215 total present), the speaker declared that the Worsted act had been passed.

On July 21, 1890, Ballin, Joseph & Co imported into New York certain manufactures of worsted. In line with the Worsted act, the collector assessed the duty rate prescribed at the time for manufactures of wool. The importers contended that the duty collected was in excess of what the law permitted, according to schedule K of 22 Stat. 488, c.121. In their request for refund from the Board of General Appraisers, the importers argued that the Worsted act had been enacted in violation of Article I, Section 5 of the Constitution of the United States. In particular, Ballin argued that a quorum of the House had not been present when the vote was taken and therefore the bill had not been legally passed.

On October 13, 1890, the Board ruled against Ballin. Judge Henderson M. Somerville drafted the Board's decision, finding that the act of May 9, 1890, had been constitutionally enacted and that the duty had been correctly assessed by the New York collector. The importers appealed to the Circuit Court of the United States for the Southern District of New York, which reversed the Board's decision. The circuit court reasoned that the act Congress had passed "expressly confined the exercise of its powers to the Secretary of the Treasury, in exclusion of any other officer" and that the collector had overstepped his bounds.

== Opinion of the Court ==
The Supreme Court heard oral arguments on December 2, 1891, with Attorney General William Miller and Solicitor General William Howard Taft arguing the case for the government. Edwin B. Smith represented Ballin, Joseph & Co. Two questions were presented to the Court: "Was the act of May 9, 1890, legally passed?", and "What was the act's meaning?" On February 29, 1892, the Court issued its unanimous decision, addressing both questions in turn.

The Court started by assuming that information recorded in the House Journal is always accurate. This effectively dismissed any claims based on possible mistakes in the journal. The Court noted that Speaker Reed's actions on May 9, 1890, as recorded in the journal, were in direct compliance with Rule XV; Rule XV had been legally enacted under the Rules of Proceedings Clause of the Constitution. Article I, Section 5, Clause 1, of the Constitution provides that "a majority of each [house] shall constitute a quorum to do business." Rule XV provided the House with a clear method to establish the presence of a quorum.

After determining that a quorum of the House had been present on May 9, 1890, the Court addressed the legality of enacting the Worsted act. The universal default rule of parliamentary bodies is that a majority of the quorum may take action and therefore the power of the house "[arises] when a majority are present." In concluding their analysis of the first question, the Court stated that "a majority shall be a quorum to do business; but a majority of that quorum is sufficient to decide the most important question."

Having established that the Worsted act was legally passed, the Court addressed the second question. The act unambiguously stated that duties on worsted cloths became identical to those placed on woolen cloths by the Tariff Act of 1883. Although no direct action was necessary by the Secretary of the Treasury to put this act into force, the Treasury Department issued a letter on May 13, 1890, instructing all customs officers to publish the act "for the information and guidance of the public."

The judgment of the Circuit Court was reversed and the case remanded for further proceedings.

== Reaction ==
The decision of the Supreme Court came as no surprise in Washington. Even Democrats who had objected to Reed's tactics in the Republican-controlled House as tyrannical, readily admitted that Representatives should participate in the business of the House whenever present. After being congratulated by his colleagues, Reed remarked on how pleased he was by the Court's decision: "That the whole need not participate is settled, their presence being the only essential."

The Spokane Review did not see the news as good, however, proclaiming that czarism had taken over the government: "The supreme court has handed down an infamous decision sustaining the ruling of Speaker Reed that a quorum is a quorum whether some of the members are dumb, deaf, blind or devoid of common sense. It is evident that we [...] will never enjoy perfect happiness until [this country] fills every branch of the public service with filibusterers and equips them with supreme power to block the transaction of business."

== Subsequent developments ==
In their 1995 Open Letter to Congressman Gingrich Bruce Ackerman and 16 other well-known law professors asserted that rules of procedure in Congress that require more than a simple majority of those voting to pass legislation are unconstitutional, in part basing their conclusion on the decision of Ballin. In particular, Ackerman et al. were writing about a rule adopted by the 104th Congress requiring a three-fifths majority to pass an increase in income tax rates. Professors John O. McGinnis and Michael B. Rappaport responded in the article The Constitutionality of Legislative Supermajority Requirements: A Defense by interpreting Ballin as stating that the universal default rule that a majority of the quorum may take action applies only when neither the Constitution nor the legislature imposes a specific rule.

On that topic, the U.S. Mason's Manual notes, "A deliberative body cannot by its own act or rule require a two-thirds vote to take any action where the constitution or controlling authority requires only a majority vote. To require a two-thirds vote, for example, to take any action would be to give to any number more than one-third of the members the power to defeat the action and amount to a delegation of the powers of the body to a minority." The Rules of Proceedings Clause in the Constitution—the organic act under which Congress is assembled—authorizes the houses of Congress to pass a supermajority rule if they so choose. Hence, rules requiring supermajorities are constitutional, but the rules themselves could be changed by a simple majority.

The debate between minority rights and majority rule continues as of 2010, in particular as it relates to filibustering in the United States Senate. If the Senate voted on whether to change the cloture rule, only a simple majority would be needed to change it, though the attempt itself might be filibustered in an effort to prevent the majority from reaching a vote. However, the Senate reinterpreted the rule to require only a simple majority for cloture for nominations (or, more precisely, for confirmation of Presidential nominations) using the nuclear option in 2013 and 2017 and doing so for legislation has been suggested by both President Trump and some senators.

== See also ==
- Cloture
- Filibuster (United States Senate)
- Nuclear Option
