= John H. Burleigh =

American politician

John Holmes Burleigh
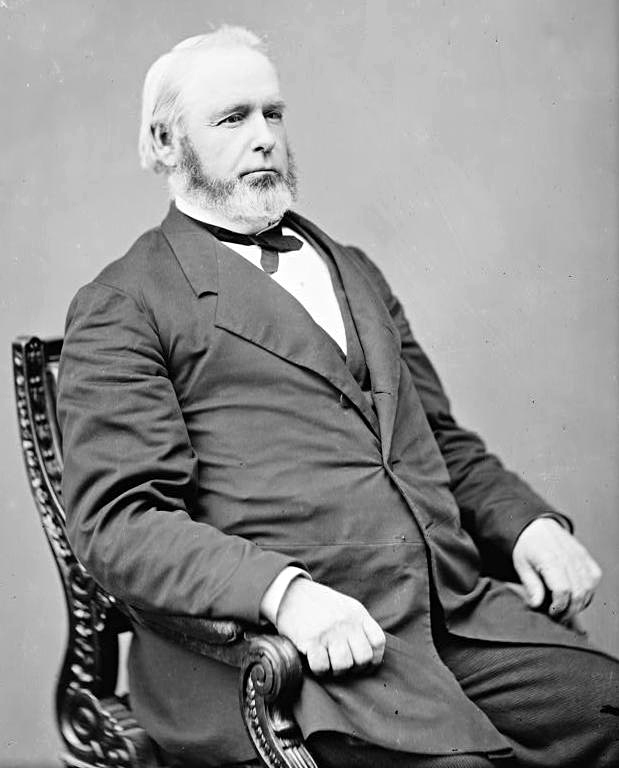

Member of the U.S. House of Representatives from Maine's 1st district
- In office March 4, 1873 – March 3, 1877
- Preceded by: John Lynch
- Succeeded by: Thomas B. Reed

Member of the Maine House of Representatives
- In office 1862; 1864; 1866; 1872

Personal details
- Born: October 9, 1822 South Berwick, Maine, U.S.
- Died: December 5, 1877 (aged 55) South Berwick, Maine, U.S.
- Party: Republican
- Profession: Politician, Sailor, Manufacturer, Banker

John Holmes Burleigh (October 9, 1822 – December 5, 1877) was a nineteenth-century politician, sailor, manufacturer and banker from Maine. He was the son of the former U.S. representative from Maine, William Burleigh, who also represented the 1st district.

Burleigh was born in South Berwick, Maine, the son of Deborah (Currier) and William Burleigh. He attended Berwick Academy and, at sixteen years of age, became a sailor and commanded a ship on foreign voyages from 1846 to 1853. In 1853, he engaged in the manufacturing of wool for the textile industry as well as banking in South Berwick. He was a member of the Maine House of Representatives in 1862, 1864, 1866 and 1872 and was a delegate to the Republican National Convention in 1864. Burleigh was elected a Republican to the United States House of Representatives in 1872, serving from 1873 to 1877, being unsuccessful for renomination in 1876. Afterwards, he resumed former manufacturing pursuits until his death in South Berwick, Maine on December 5, 1877. He was interred in Portland Street Cemetery in South Berwick.

U.S. House of Representatives
Preceded by John Lynch	Member of the U.S. House of Representatives from Maine's 1st congressional district March 4, 1873 – March 3, 1877	Succeeded by Thomas B. Reed
