= Thomas Brackett Reed =

American politician (1839–1902)

Thomas B. Reed
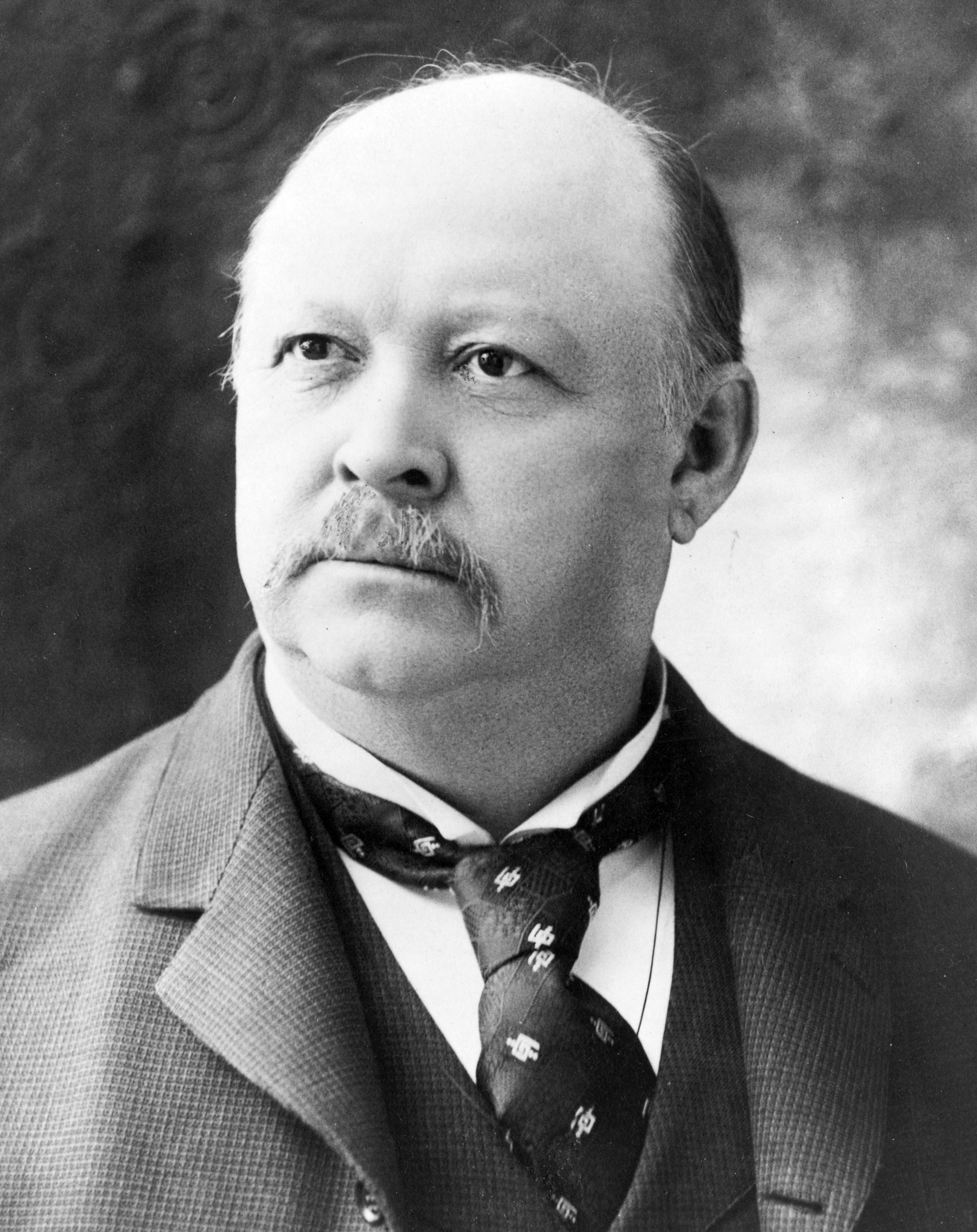
- Reed c. 1894

32nd Speaker of the United States House of Representatives
- In office December 2, 1895 – September 4, 1899
- Preceded by: Charles F. Crisp
- Succeeded by: David B. Henderson
- In office December 4, 1889 – March 3, 1891
- Preceded by: John G. Carlisle
- Succeeded by: Charles F. Crisp

Leader of the House Republican Conference
- In office December 4, 1889 – March 3, 1899
- Preceded by: James G. Blaine
- Succeeded by: David B. Henderson

Member of the U.S. House of Representatives from Maine's 1st district
- In office March 4, 1877 – September 4, 1899
- Preceded by: John H. Burleigh
- Succeeded by: Amos L. Allen

19th Attorney General of Maine
- In office 1870–1872
- Governor: Joshua Chamberlain; Sidney Perham
- Preceded by: William P. Frye
- Succeeded by: Harris M. Plaisted

Member of the Maine Senate from Cumberland County
- In office 1870

Member of the Maine House of Representatives
- In office 1868–1869

Personal details
- Born: Thomas Brackett Reed Jr. October 18, 1839 Portland, Maine, U.S.
- Died: December 7, 1902 (aged 63) Washington, D.C., U.S.
- Resting place: Evergreen Cemetery, Portland, Maine
- Party: Republican
- Spouse: Susan P. Merrill (m. 1871)
- Children: Katherine Reed Balentine
- Education: Bowdoin College
- Profession: Attorney
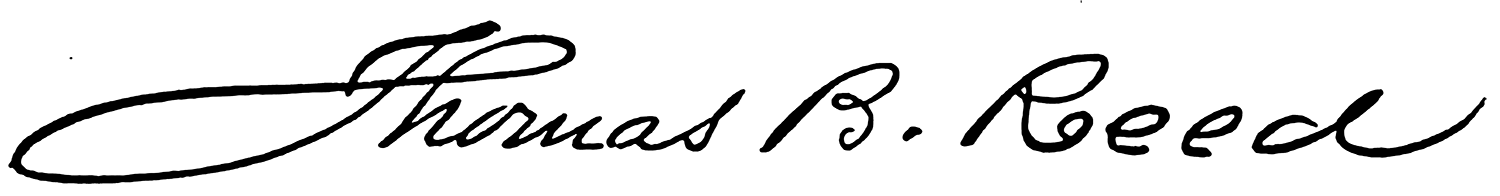
- Signature

Military service
- Allegiance: United States (Union)
- Service: Union Navy
- Years of service: 1864–1865
- Rank: Acting Assistant Paymaster
- Unit: USS Sibyl
- Wars: American Civil War

Thomas Brackett Reed Jr. (October 18, 1839 – December 7, 1902) was an American attorney, author, parliamentarian and Republican Party politician from Maine who served as the 32nd Speaker of the United States House of Representatives from 1889 to 1891 and 1895 to 1899. Reed had greater influence over the agenda and operations of the House than any prior Speaker, leading to him being referred to as "Czar" Reed by opponents. His first term was marked by a dramatic expansion of the office's formal authority through changes to the House Rules, and he remains one of the most powerful Speakers in House history. He set out to put into practical effect his dictum "The best system is to have one party govern and the other party watch" and dramatically increased the power of the Speaker over the House by limiting the ability of the minority party to prevent the establishment of a quorum. Reed helped pass the Lodge Bill, which sought to protect African American voting rights in the Southern United States, but the bill failed in the Senate and never became law.

He represented Maine's 1st congressional district in the House from 1877 to 1899 and, prior to his time in Congress, represented Portland in the Maine legislature and served as Attorney General of Maine. In 1876, he was elected to represent Cumberland and York counties in the U.S. House and was re-elected for twelve consecutive terms. (Note: For one term, 1883–1885, Reed represented Maine at large.)

In 1896, he ran for president on a hard currency platform but lost the Republican nomination to William McKinley. He voted in favor of the Spanish–American War, but while serving as Speaker in 1899, Reed resigned from the House in opposition to growing American imperialism, which left him politically isolated following the American victory over Spain and the passage of the Newlands Resolution.

== Early life and education ==
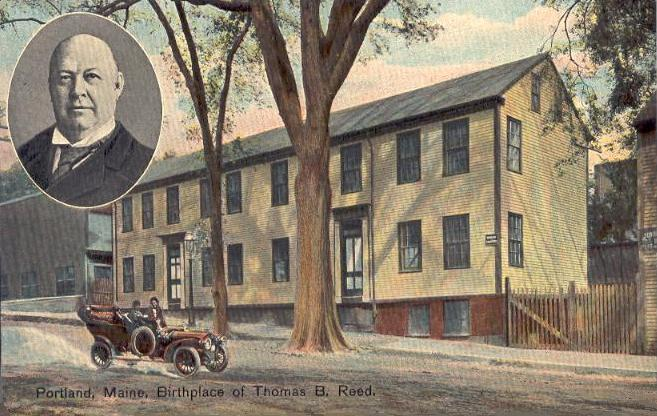
A postcard of Reed's birthplace in Portland, Maine

Thomas Brackett Reed was born on October 18, 1839, in a small two-story tenement on Hancock Street in Portland, Maine. His parents, Matilda Prince (née Mitchell) and Thomas Brackett Reed Sr., were natives of Maine who traced their American ancestry to the Arbella and Mayflower, respectively. The Reed family were not wealthy; Thomas Sr. was captain of a fishing boat before becoming a watchman in a Portland sugar warehouse.

Reed attended public schools, including the Portland Boys' School, and was an avid student and reader. He showed interest in public affairs from an early age, attending Neal Dow's trial for involvement in the Portland Rum Riot in 1855. He was also an avid member of the Congregational Church as a young man. Members of his congregation raised funds to provide him a college education with intent that he become a minister, but he left the church and returned the donations.

=== Bowdoin College (1856–1860) ===
After graduating high school, Reed entered Bowdoin College in 1856 and undertook a mandatory course centered on Christian theology, Latin, Greek, and mathematics. Bowdoin was noted for its required courses in English composition and oratory and had already produced Nathaniel Hawthorne, President of the United States Franklin Pierce, and Henry Wadsworth Longfellow. The faculty consisted of ten men, led by president Leonard Woods and including Charles Carroll Everett, Thomas C. Upham, Alpheus Packard, and William Smyth. Reed's professor of rhetoric and oratory, Joshua Chamberlain, later distinguished himself at the Battle of Gettysburg and served as Governor of Maine during Reed's term in the state legislature.

At Bowdoin, Reed gained a personal reputation for his ability to recite Joseph Butler's Analogy of Religion, Natural and Revealed from memory. He was a member of the rowing crew, chess club, Psi Upsilon fraternity, and an editor of the annual yearbook. He debated as a member of the Peucinian Society and was an avid reader of Carlyle, Goethe, Thackeray, Macaulay, and Charles Reade, among other less popular authors.

Reed kept a small, close group of friends, including Samuel Fessenden, the son of U.S. Senator William Pitt Fessenden, who provided Reed a loan to complete his education. Samuel Fessenden was an avid abolitionist who participated in the civil conflict in Kansas and, one year after graduation, died at the Second Battle of Bull Run. His death had a profound impact on Reed, who memorialized Fessenden as "the quiet associate of the studious hours ... sublimated in the crucible of death from all imperfections, clothed upon with all his virtues and radiant with all the possibilities of a generous youth."

=== Legal and U.S. Navy career (1860–1865) ===
As a senior, Reed reversed a previously mediocre academic record to lead his class; he finished fifth in the graduating class of 1860 and was elected to Phi Beta Kappa. Abandoning any interest in ministry, he spent the next years doing odd jobs and studying law. He taught school in Portland for a year before moving to California in 1861. He was admitted to the bar in San Jose on September 8, 1863, after an examination by eminent California attorney William T. Wallace. While in San Jose, he delivered pro-Union speeches and signed a letter from sixteen members of the bar endorsing judge Samuel Bell McKee for re-election to the bench, citing McKee's determination to "uphold the Administration in its present efforts to suppress the rebellion and sustain the Constitution and laws of the United States." However, he soon returned to Portland, deciding "nature never intended any man to live [in California], only to dig gold and get himself out of it, and to shudder in dreams ever afterwards."

On his return to Maine, Reed joined the law offices of Howard and Strout as a clerk. He joined the United States Navy in April 1864, winning an appointment as acting assistant paymaster on the recommendation of Senator Fessenden. He served in that role, primarily on the gunboat USS Sibyl on the Mississippi and Tennessee rivers, until honorably discharged in late 1865. When a Reed supporter later pointed out his opponents boasted of their war records, he retorted, "Tell them I kept a grocery on a gunboat down in Louisiana in wartime."

After the war, he was elected as a companion of the Maine Commandery of the Military Order of the Loyal Legion of the United States.

== State politics (1867–1876) ==
=== Maine legislator (1867–1870) ===
After the war, Reed returned to Portland and was admitted to the Maine bar in October 1865. He opened a practice in Portland, taking petty civil and criminal cases. In 1867, his colleague Nathan Webb secured Reed's nomination for the Maine House of Representatives; after some persuading, Reed agreed to run. In the heavily Republican city of Portland, he was easily elected; he was re-elected to a second term in 1868.

Reed, one of the youngest members of the Maine House at the time, served on the joint legislative committee on the judiciary and drafted a bills for a general law of incorporation and the abolition of capital punishment in the state; both failed. He distinguished himself for parliamentary skill in the 1869 U.S. Senate election between former Vice President Hannibal Hamlin and incumbent Senator Lot M. Morrill, whom Reed supported. In the Republican caucus to nominate a candidate, Reed moved to rule a blank ballot invalid, breaking a tie in favor of Morrill. (Hamlin was later elected by a vote of the whole legislature.) Despite his youth, by March 1869 the Portland Press considered Reed "the actual though not the nominal leader of [the House]."

In 1869, Reed was elected Senator for Cumberland County. He continued to serve on the joint committee on the judiciary and successfully led the fight to delay construction of the Portland and Rutland Railroad. He also paid homage to his former patron, Senator Fessenden, who died in 1869. Though Fessenden had become unpopular in the state owing to his vote against the impeachment of Andrew Johnson, Reed aggressively defended Fessenden's legacy and wartime service.

Reed later reflected that his greatest achievement as a state legislator was securing the re-organization of the Cumberland County courts in an effort to reduce the time necessary to bring cases to a final judgment.

=== Attorney General of Maine (1870–1873) ===
In January 1870, the Republican caucus nominated Reed for Attorney General, and he was elected easily. As Attorney General, Reed significantly raised his profile. His first months in office were marked by the high-profile trial of a man charged with killing his wife's lover. Overcoming a "crime of passion" defense, Reed won a manslaughter verdict, though he had asked for a charge of murder. As a result, Reed advocated for the abolition of spousal privilege, which had excluded the only witness, the defendant's wife, from testifying. He also advocated separately as Attorney General for bail bond reform and an increase in the State's peremptory challenges in jury selection. Most of Reed's suggestions did eventually become law, but were not adopted immediately, which he attributed to the fact that prosecutors were barred by virtue of their office from advising the legislature.

He continued to oppose the railroad corporations, calling for an increase in the $5,000 cap ($109,113 in 2024) on wrongful death claims and challenging the merger of the Portland and Kennebec with the Maine Central under a writ of quo warranto; his action was rendered moot when the legislature recognized the merger as valid. In 1894, Reed spoke out in favor of consolidation and declared the writ was a mistake, arguing that the merger had "resulted in better stations, better trains, better transportation facilities of every kind."

Reed served as Attorney General for the three years prescribed by tradition before leaving office in 1873. He returned to a more lucrative private practice and served for three years as Portland city solicitor, representing the city in personal injury suits and routine business.

== Early United States House career (1877–1881) ==
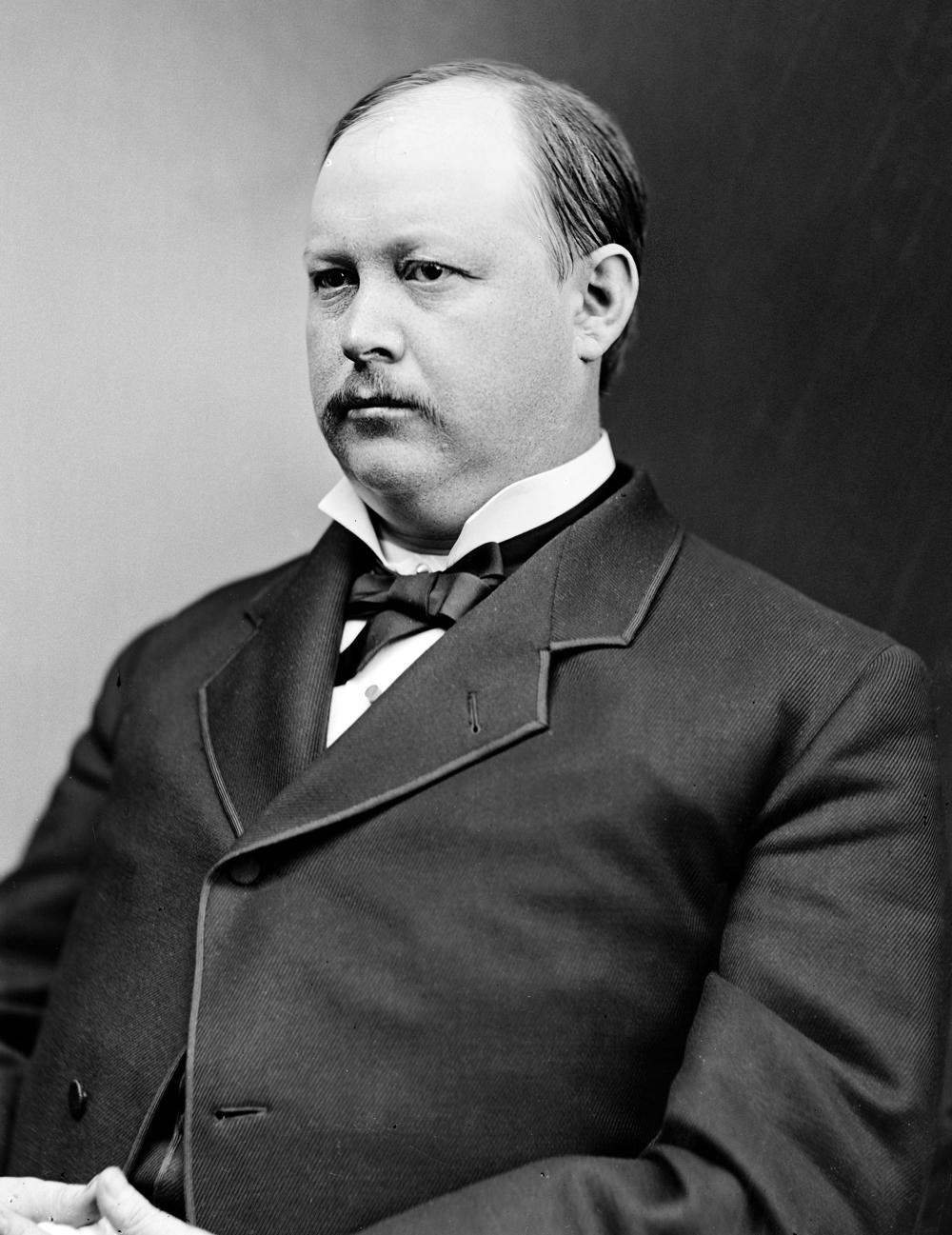
Reed, c. 1870s

=== 1876 election ===
Reed was nominated for Congress from Maine's first district in 1876. Incumbent Representative John H. Burleigh had split from the state party organization, led by Senators James G. Blaine and Hannibal Hamlin, and Reed, a respected organization man, was chosen to oppose him. Reed's strength was in the city of Portland, while most of Burleigh's support was from York County. Reed narrowly carried the district convention on June 29. The conflict between Reed and Burleigh carried into the general election, with a Burleigh ticket in the campaign. Reed campaigned in favor of prohibition and was attacked for his association with Robert G. Ingersoll, known for his radical advocacy for agnosticism. Reed was forced to deny that he was an atheist, but the charge would be repeated in later campaigns. Ultimately, Reed narrowly won by fewer than 1,000 votes on September 9, with Burleigh receiving 177.

=== Early congressional service and rise ===
Reed was relatively active in debate during his first term, speaking against Fernando Wood in support of funding for the United States diplomatic corps and delivering his most famous early speech against the federal restoration of the campus of William & Mary College, which was destroyed during the war. Arguing that the expenditure would set a precedent which would allow "every claim agent who loved the Lost Cause and a good many who did not" to raid the Treasury, Reed argued, "You were beaten and yet you want us to take the consequences. You come forward and insist that the victorious country shall pay for the damages inflicted upon it by its enemies."

The highlight of his first term was his appointment on May 20, 1878, to the committee to investigate charges of fraud in the 1876 presidential election. Reed used the politically sensitive role to advocate the Republican position, restoring the party's fortunes ahead of the 1880 election. Reed defended the legitimacy of Hayes's victory in the state of Louisiana, in particular focusing on East Feliciana Parish, where he alleged that a violent wave of crime (including murder) had been for the purpose of political intimidation, as it had ended suddenly on election day and the victims had been primarily Republicans. Reed also cross-examined William T. Pelton, Tilden's nephew and aide, regarding evidence Pelton had delivered bribes on behalf of his uncle's campaign. Pelton's testimony under Reed's questioning was so damaging that Tilden appeared before the committee himself to deny the accusations. The final Republican minority report suggested Pelton, a poor man, could not have made such bribes without Tilden's knowledge. While the report did not vindicate Hayes, it softened the political blow by demonstrating that electioneering and misconduct had not been one-sided and raised Reed's profile beyond that of an ordinary House freshman.

His seat was nevertheless threatened by the rise of the Greenback Party, which favored an inflationary monetary policy, and his vote against the Bland–Allison Act. In his 1878 re-election campaign, he came out vigorously against paper currency and was aided by appearances from James Garfield and Galusha Grow. His re-election was ultimately owed to the failure of the opposition to settle on a single candidate, and he won with a plurality. During the campaign, Reed developed a widely quoted aphorism against monetary expansion: "You won't have any more potatoes if you call them four thousand pecks than if you call them one thousand bushels."

In 1880, Reed joined the rest of Maine in supporting James G. Blaine's unsuccessful campaign for the Republican nomination. He was a delegate to the 1880 Republican National Convention. In the fall, he faced a united opposition following the fusion of the Greenback and Democratic ticket in Maine. Returns gave Reed a 109-vote lead, but his opponent alleged fraud and challenged his election in the House. The Republican majority declared Reed the victor.

== Party leadership (1881–1889) ==
=== Judiciary chair (1881–1883) ===
After Reed's election to a third term, he was briefly considered to succeed Hannibal Hamlin in the United States Senate, but he publicly declined to be a candidate. He attributed his decision to the narrow Republican majority in the House and the possibility that his seat would flip.

By the time the 47th United States Congress met on December 5, 1881, the new President James A. Garfield had been assassinated and Chester A. Arthur had succeeded him. With few tested leaders in the House, the Republican caucus turned to J. Warren Keifer as Speaker of the House after sixteen ballots; Reed finished third with eleven votes on the final ballot, behind Frank Hiscock. In a concession to his opponents, Keifer named Hiscock and Reed to House leadership as chairs of the powerful committees on Appropriations and the Judiciary, respectively. In a significant step, Reed also joined the Speaker and George Robeson on the powerful Committee on Rules after January 9, 1882, when Godlove Orth, another Keifer opponent who was left out of leadership, resigned in protest.

In both roles, Reed defended the authority of the office of Speaker and majority rule. When Orth introduced a resolution to select committees and their chairs by an elective board of eleven members, Reed spoke out against it on the grounds that "the Speaker is not only under constant supervision of public opinion but also of the House." The resolution lost by a large nonpartisan majority. During a May 1882 debate over a contested election in North Carolina, the parties came to a head over the minority's use of the filibuster. In response, Reed moved to amend the House Rules to bar any dilatory motion while a motion to adjourn was on the table. After a week of efforts by the Democratic minority to delay this Rules amendment, Reed moved that the dilatory tactics were out of order and proposed that "no member or set of members have any right to use the rules which are to be changed to prevent the change which the House desires to make. ... There is no such thing as suicide in any provision of the Constitution of the United States." After three hours of debate, Keifer upheld Reed on the point of order. Former Speaker Samuel J. Randall protested and appealed to the House, where the Speaker's decision was upheld by a majority vote. According to De Alva S. Alexander, "[From] that hour Reed became the real leader of his party. Ever after, so long as he remained in Congress, his voice gave the word of command."

Reed further expanded the principle of majority rule in debate over Tariff of 1883. As a protectionist, Reed supported higher tariffs on imports, but the House appeared unlikely to pass an independent tariff bill. Instead, Reed presented a report from the Rules Committee to suspend the rules by majority vote and request a conference committee to consider the internal revenue bill, to which the Senate had attached tariff amendments. Reed's report passed the House, but only after the first vote failed to show a quorum. The report was highly controversial; Samuel S. Cox denounced it as "a fraud on parliamentary law," and Senators Thomas F. Bayard and James B. Beck refused to sit on the conference committee. The resulting bill itself, sometimes called the "mongrel tariff," was highly unpopular as well; Reed later wrote of his regret over the episode, claiming that none of the tariff commissioners' report had been enacted, "but all of its mistakes were."

=== House Minority leadership (1883–89) ===
In 1882, the Democratic Party regained control of the House and John G. Carlisle of Kentucky was elected Speaker. Reed continued to seek reform of the House Rules from the minority by exploiting disagreements between Samuel J. Randall and William Ralls Morrison, two members of Democratic leadership who disagreed sharply over tariff policy. Reed retained his seats on the Rules and Judiciary committees and gained a spot on the powerful Committee on Ways and Means.

During his six years in the House minority, Reed also grew in party influence. Former Speaker Keifer, by virtue of seniority, retained leadership of the minority, but ultimately lost re-election to his House seat in 1884. When the next Congress met, Reed's name was placed in nomination by William McKinley for the party endorsement for Speaker; he defeated Frank Hiscock by 63 votes against 42 for the honor, thus formally sanctioning Reed as the party's floor leader. Hiscock also left the House in 1887 when he was elected to the U.S. Senate, leaving Reed the undisputed leader of the party in the House, though McKinley, Nelson Dingley, and Joe Cannon were rising stars.

== Speaker of the House (1889–91, 1895–99) ==
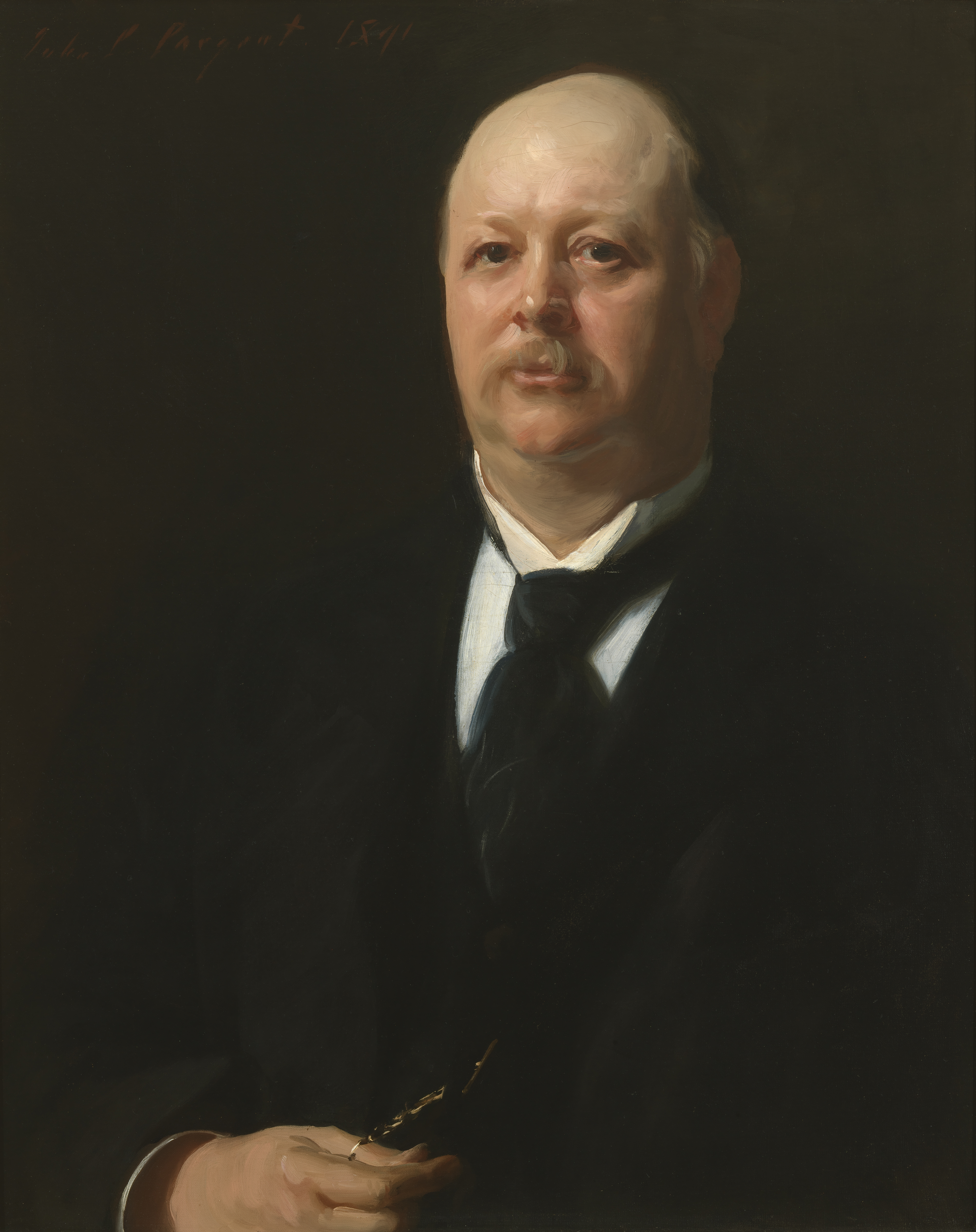
An 1891 portrait of Speaker Reed by John Singer Sargent

=== First term (1889–91) ===
In 1888, the Republican Party retook control of the House of Representatives and the White House in an election defined by their support for the protective tariff. In Congress, Reed was a leader of the campaign, delivering a lengthy and celebrated May 19 speech against tariff reform legislation before the House. Following the election, The Washington Post reported that the "speakership question was regarded on all sides as being settled" in favor of Reed, though his leading rival, McKinley, was personally very popular. Reed's election as Speaker was decisively ensured by the support of the New York delegation on November 29, 1889. He carried the caucus the next day on the second ballot with 85 votes to McKinley's 38 and was elected speaker at the opening of the next session on December 2, 1889.

McKinley was named chairman of Ways and Means, placing him in charge of the tariff, with Reed's lesser rivals Cannon and David B. Henderson on Appropriations and Julius C. Burrows as chairman of Manufactures. McKinley and Cannon also joined Reed on the Rules Committee.

==== Rules reform ====
Even before his election as Speaker, Reed had renewed his calls for rules reform. In a March 1889 article for Century magazine, he demanded checks on dilatory motions and a restoration of the "morning hour," permitting the House to consider urgent measures for prompt action at the start of each day, rather than consider measures in the order they were presented. In the October North American Review, Reed compared the situation in the House to that in the House of Commons, where Reed argued Irish nationalists had hijacked the rules beyond their original intent in order to extract concessions through obstruction. Reed vowed that the incoming Republican House would adopt new Rules wholesale, as opposed to the traditional practice of adopting the previous House's rules pro forma and amending as needed.

On January 21, 1890, Reed made his first serious reform to House Rules when he refused a motion by Richard P. Bland to require tellers for a motion to adjourn, on the grounds that the motion was merely intended to delay adjournment and obstruct House business. After a prolonged and heated debate, the Speaker's decision was ratified 149 to 137.

In particular, Reed sought to circumscribe the "disappearing quorum"—the ability of the minority to block business by remaining silent during a quorum call, which, under the rules, prevented a member from being counted as present even if physically in the chamber, thus forcing the House to suspend business. Reed's solution was implemented on January 29, 1890, in what has popularly been called the "Battle of the Reed Rules," when Democrats attempted to prevent Charles Brooks Smith, a Republican from West Virginia whose election was contested, from being seated. The motion to seat Brooks passed 162–1, short of the 165 required for quorum; when voting closed Democrats shouted, "No quorum," a formal quorum count was triggered. Reed began the roll call, and when members refused to answer, Reed directed the Clerk to count them as present but not voting. Startled Democrats protested heatedly, directing verbal abuse, threats, and insults at Reed, while James B. McCreary, a Democrat from Kentucky, challenged Reed's authority to count him since he had not answered to his name when the roll was called. Reed replied "The Chair is making a statement of fact that the gentleman from Kentucky is present. Does he deny it?" Unable to deny their presence, some Democrats tried to flee the chamber or hide under their desks, but Reed ordered the doors locked. One Representative, Constantine B. Kilgore of Texas, was able to flee by kicking his way through a door. The conflict over parliamentary procedure lasted three days, with Democrats delaying consideration of the bill by introducing points of order to challenge the maneuver and then appealing Reed's rulings to the floor. Democrats finally dropped their objections on January 31, and Smith was seated on February 3 by a vote of 166–0. Six days later, Reed won a vote to formalize the new Rules, eliminating the disappearing quorum and lowering the quorum to 100 members. Though Democrats reinstated the disappearing quorum when they took control of the House the following year, Reed would prove so adroit at using the tactic against them that they reinstated the "Reed Rules" in 1894.

Following his decisive victory in the Smith election contest, Reed introduced wholesale reforms designed to speed the pace of legislation in the House. The Democratic minority permitted the resumption of business, with former Speaker Carlisle admitting, "We protest, but the case must be tried elsewhere." Under those conditions, the 51st Congress was the most productive since the Civil War and passed at least twenty-six pieces of major legislation, including the McKinley Tariff, Sherman Silver Purchase Act, Sherman Antitrust Act, and Immigration Act of 1891.

==== McKinley Tariff ====
As the campaign of 1888 had been waged over the issue of protective tariff policy, passing a heightened tariff was a key priority of the 51st Congress. The resulting bill, known as the McKinley Tariff after its primary author, passed the House on May 21, 1890, after an expedited drafting process. A revised bill passed the Senate on September 10 with a reciprocity clause (supported by now-Secretary of State James G. Blaine) attached. Despite Reed's opposition, the reciprocity clause was allowed to remain after some further amendments, and the bill was signed into law on October 1.

With a month to the House elections, the McKinley Tariff was immediately the center of political debate; no tariff since the so-called "Tariff of Abominations" had been as controversial. The Tariff was seen as favoring the industrial and financial regions of the Northeast and Midwest over the rural South and West, which were suffering under poor conditions for the agricultural industry. The free trade publication The Nation referred to it as "a series of minute interferences with trade and industry for the benefit of individuals, firms and corporations" and attributed its passage to the repayment of campaign debts to corporate donors. Though Reed defended the tariff package in public, he ultimately blamed it for the party's massive defeat in the 1890 elections and in 1894, admitted that protection had been carried to its extreme on certain goods. However, he later argued that the tariff had been a success in light of the impending global financial collapse, which had rendered the international mercantile situation "a quicksand which then began to give signs of sinking." Though repealed and replaced by the next Congress, it gained greater support after the Panic of 1893 and made McKinley a serious national political figure; he would go on to win the White House in 1896 as the premier champion of industrial protection.

==== Sherman Silver Purchase Act ====
By 1888, there was a growing movement in both parties to return the country to a currency system backed by both silver and gold (thus expanding the money supply), and it had become conventional wisdom that it was necessary to "do something for silver." Though Reed was a firm supporter of "sound money," which tended to favor the more stable gold standard, a majority in both chambers of Congress had some level of sympathy for the free silver movement. On January 20, 1890, Edwin H. Conger (chairman of Coinage, Weights and Measures) introduced a bill authorizing the Treasury to issue notes in exchange for silver bullion at market price. A revised version of Conger's bill, providing for the purchase of $4,500,000 of silver per month ($142,951,899 in 2024), was reported to the House in early June. If silver reached the ratio of 16 to 1 under this bill, free coinage was authorized.

In a party caucus on June 4, Reed spoke against any further concessions to silver advocates; the silver Republicans dissented, seriously threatening party unity. On June 5, the Rules Committee (Reed, McKinley, and Cannon) passed a special order to permit only two days of debate before a final vote at 3 o'clock on June 7. After an outbreak of acrimonious dissent, the special order passed 120 to 117, and the bill ultimately passed on schedule without further amendments by a vote of 135 to 119.

However, the Senate, controlled by silver advocates, passed an amended version adopting an unconditional free coinage amendment on June 17. The amendment caught Reed and House Republicans by surprise; a considerable number of Representatives were absent, making its passage likely if brought to an immediate vote. When McKinley moved on June 19 for approval of the House Journal (containing the procedural business of the day), Roger Q. Mills objected that the Journal had not been read in its entirety. The omitted portions were the read, revealing the Senate bill had been referred to the Committee on Coinage, sparking an uproar. In a rare parliamentary defeat for Reed, the Journal was not approved by a vote of 105 to 117. Mills then successfully moved to have the Journal amended, hastening a vote. On June 20, Richard P. Bland moved to debate the bill before the House. Conger and Reed engaged in a series of dilatory maneuvers, arguing that the bill was not on available for debate, because it was before Conger's committee. By the time the bill came for a vote the next day, enough Republican votes had been whipped via telegraph to return a working majority to Washington, and Bland's motion was defeated by a vote of 144 to 117.

A conference bill, called the Sherman Silver Purchase Act after John Sherman, emerged which omitted the free coinage of silver and called for the parity of the two metals. The bill passed with great difficulty in the lame duck 1891 session.

==== Lodge Federal Elections Bill ====
One of the most significant and controversial pieces of legislation which Reed pressed for passage in the 51st Congress did not become law. In 1889 and 1890, Republicans undertook one last stand in favor of federal enforcement of the Fifteenth Amendment to protect the voting rights of blacks in the Solid South, and Reed took a special interest in the project. Under the Lodge Bill, introduced on June 14, 1890, congressional elections would be placed under the protection of the federal government; Reed personally defended the bill and the concept of equality of races under the law in an April 1890 speech and published article in the June 1890 North American Review. Opponents, especially in the South, derided it as the "Force Bill," and cynics attributed the proposal to an effort to secure Southern seats in the face of waning Republican support in the West. Reed also aroused Northern opposition in his speech, when he defended black voting in the South by way of comparison to immigrant votes in New York and other cities, arguing, "Why should they poll their ignorance and we not poll ours?" Reed, McKinley, and Cannon voted the Bill out of committee on June 25 and, over Democratic objections, it passed after a strict debate schedule on July 2.

In the Senate, the bill was filibustered through two sessions of Congress, until it was ultimately laid aside during the lame duck session of January 1891 in favor of the Sherman Silver Purchase Act. Notably, several Republican Senators from the newly admitted Western states voted to prioritize the Silver Purchase Act; likely in retaliation, the House rejected a free silver bill which passed the Senate to "provide against the contraction of the currency." The Lodge Bill was the last serious effort in Congress to enforce the terms of the Fifteenth Amendment until the Voting Rights Act of 1965, and its defeat is sometimes marked as the beginning of the decline in American race relations.

=== Return to minority (1891–95) ===
In reaction to Reed's aggressive legislative agenda and the new appropriations associated with it, the 51st Congress was branded by critics as the "Billion Dollar Congress." Democrats regained the House by a wide majority, and both of Reed's top lieutenants, McKinley and Cannon, were defeated. Republicans retained the Senate by a reduced margin. With government thus divided in the 52nd Congress, legislation reached a standstill. In Reed's words, the House "led a gelatinous existence, the scorn of all vertebrate animals."

Anticipating a further disaster in the 1892 elections, Reed privately opposed the nomination of President Harrison for a second term, and his own name gained some traction in the press as a potential compromise candidate. When Harrison was ultimately nominated, Reed declined to campaign for him in the general election. Grover Cleveland was elected and the Republicans lost the Senate, giving the Democratic Party control of the White House, Senate, and House for the first time since the Civil War. Reed did win a minor victory in 1892, when the Supreme Court decided United States v. Ballin, determining that Reed had acted within the Constitution in defining a quorum to include all members present.

The 53rd Congress was dominated by the Panic of 1893; it convened early in summer 1893 when President Cleveland called a special session asking for the repeal of the Sherman Silver Purchase Act. Though Reed was still a member of the minority for partisan purposes, he could be counted among the leaders of the cross-party majority which supported repeal. Reed gave the closing argument for repeal on August 26, 1893, arguing that the regular schedule of redemptions had drained the nation's currency reserves and undermined confidence in the financial system. Two days later, repeal carried in the House by a vote of 240 to 110. A vote for free silver was defeated 227 to 124. When the Senate delayed passage of the repeal bill, Reed delivered a public speech on October 25 arguing that the Senate was directly opposed to the will of the majority; five days later, repeal passed the Senate 43 to 22.

The remainder of the term was marked by infighting among the majority, which had become hopelessly divided over the currency issue; meanwhile, the Republican minority remained loyally unified behind Reed, delivering him opportunities to undermine Speaker Charles Frederick Crisp. A frustrated Crisp remarked of his predecessor on March 29, 1894:

"The leader that they follow without question has one great thought, one great idea in his mind, and that is to force this side to count a quorum. Every other question, no matter who great, no matter how important it may be, sinks into insignificance. Gentlemen on that side blindly follow him, no matter how their own convictions may differ from his. He is the great leader on that side. You will hear them privately saying 'Reed ought not to do that,' or 'This is wrong,' but when Reed says 'Do it,' they all step up and do it."

Given Crisp's failure to hold his majority together, the House officially adopted a rule to use a present, rather than voting, quorum on April 17, 1894, consistent with Reed's 1890 reforms.

=== Return to speakership (1895–99) ===
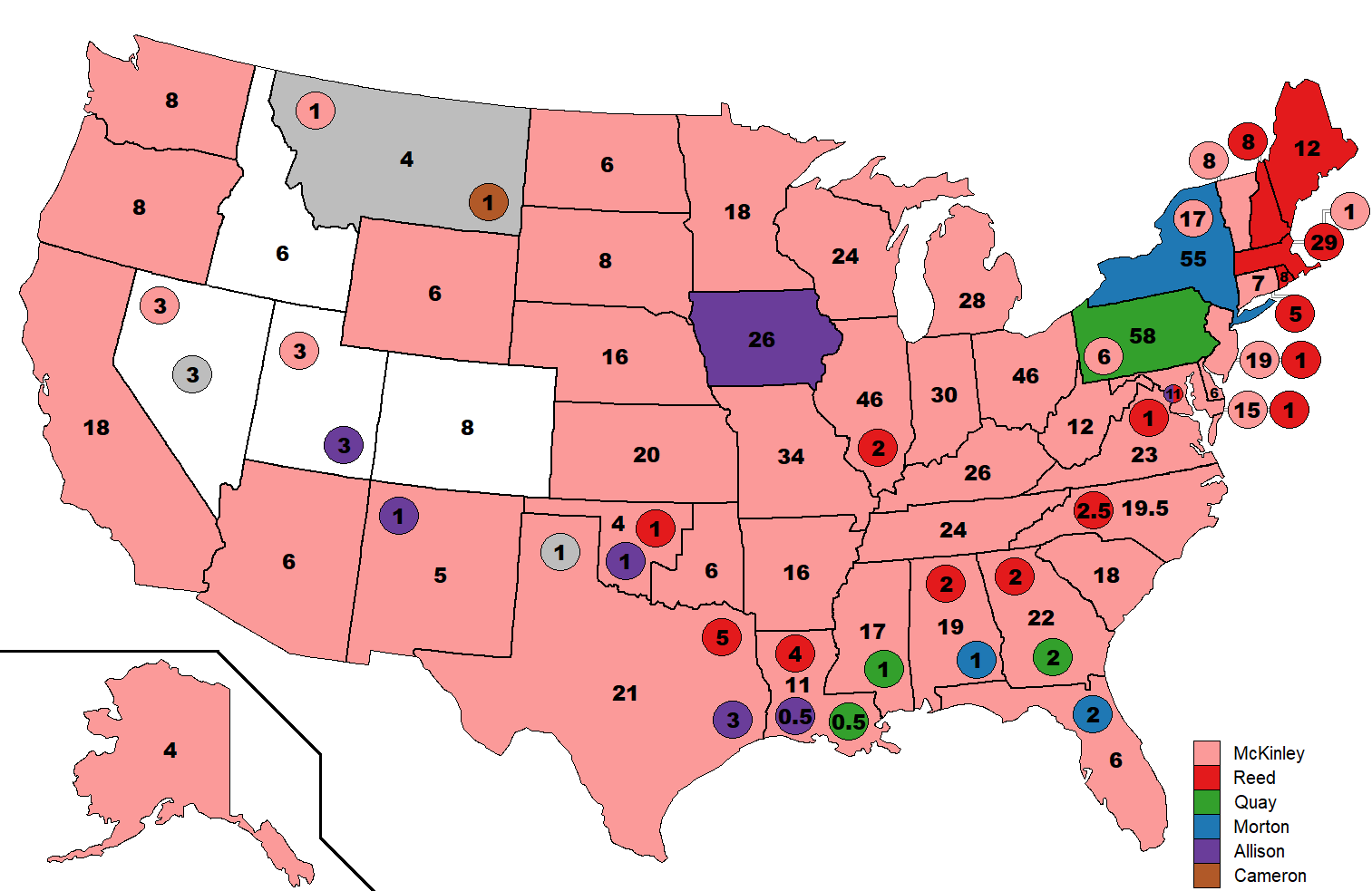
At the 1896 Republican National Convention, Reed finished second in the presidential balloting behind William McKinley, who went on to win the presidency

==== 1896 presidential campaign ====
After four years in the minority, the economic situation and divisions in the Democratic majority delivered the Republicans a historic landslide in the 1894 elections. In the House, the party gained 110 seats; (Note: Republicans gained more seats after the result of several contested elections.) as of 2025, this remains the largest single-election seat swing in United States history. With a wide majority but little room for common ground with President Cleveland outside of the currency issue, Reed's focus during the 54th Congress was his highly anticipated campaign for the presidency. Observers in the capital soon found Reed a changed man; he shaved his trademark mustache and was less given to humor or sarcasm, giving the impression of a man who felt "a necessity of taking himself seriously, of presenting an impressive aspect, of looking as wise as he can."

At the start of the 54th Congress, Reed was widely regarded as the favorite for the Republican nomination as the party's leading figure and spokesman on financial matters. He had the vigorous support of Henry Cabot Lodge and Theodore Roosevelt, and party bosses including Joseph H. Manley, Matt Quay, J. Donald Cameron, and Thomas C. Platt were reported to be sympathetic. His chief opponent for the nomination was William McKinley, his longtime lieutenant and rival for party supremacy, now serving as Governor of Ohio. McKinley's campaign was managed by Mark Hanna, who raised unprecedented sums of money for the race. Hanna also launched a nationwide publicity campaign to raise McKinley's profile and successfully framed the issue in the campaign as protective tariffs, McKinley's strength, rather than the currency question, acknowledged to be Reed's strength. As the year 1896 began, McKinley supporters claimed the secure support of 433 delegates, only thirty short of nomination on the first ballot. When New Hampshire senator William E. Chandler accused Hanna of effectively taking bribes from mercantile interests in exchange for promises of a new protective tariff, the backlash permanently damaged the struggling Reed campaign. Some accused Chandler, whose reputation for political corruption rendered his charge hypocritical, of deliberately sabotaging Reed. When the Vermont convention declared for McKinley on April 28, breaking solidarity in the New England ranks, Reed's campaign was effectively doomed.

In addition to the vigorous campaign by Hanna and Chandler's gaffe, Reed's ultimate failure to secure the nomination has been attributed to his refusal to make pledges or commitments in exchange for political or financial support. Despite his unvarnished ambition for the White House, Reed refused to give special consideration to allies or supporters when considering committee appointments or appropriations. On one occasion, he was quoted, "The bill will not be allowed to come up even with that Reed button on your coat." By the time the 1896 Republican National Convention met in St. Louis, McKinley had secured a greater share of delegate pledges than any candidate since Ulysses S. Grant in 1872, and he became the first candidate since Grant in 1868 to win an open nomination (i.e., without an incumbent in the race) on the first ballot. Reed received the support of Maine, Massachusetts, New Hampshire, and Rhode Island, as well as a handful of Southern delegates. Reed supporters at the convention, led by Lodge, did succeed in including a gold standard plank in the party platform, abandoning their prior proposal for bimetallism by international agreement. Reed vigorously supported McKinley in the general election against William Jennings Bryan, a vocal free silver advocate.

The election of 1896 returned the Republican Party to control of government, with McKinley as President and majorities in both the House and Senate. Despite some suggestions that Reed would sabotage the McKinley administration as retribution for his defeat in 1896, he set personal differences aside and was again credited as the shepherd of the Republican agenda. Nelson Dingley returned as chairman of Ways and Means and set about drafting the protective tariff legislation for which McKinley had campaigned, ultimately passed as the Dingley Tariff in July 1897.

==== Spanish-American War and resignation ====
The struggle for Cuban independence which had begun in 1895 was the subject of increasing American attention during the Cleveland and McKinley presidencies. The severity of Spanish rule and the potential for an economic and military foothold in the Caribbean drew calls for an American intervention on the island, which had long been the target of expansionists. Reed was an opponent of "jingoism" and expansionism generally, having privately criticized Benjamin Harrison's involvement in Chile and publicly opposed efforts to annex Hawaii. Foreign policy is the constitutional province of the Senate, giving Reed few opportunities to participate in the growing debate over Cuba. On July 7, 1897, the issue came before the House for the first time when Representative Benton McMillin offered a resolution recognizing the Cuban rebels. Nelson Dingley promptly moved for adjournment.

Reed continued to avoid addressing Cuba in the House but made his position public through a series of interviews and articles. In September, he published an article in the Illustrated American which called for the government to avoid foreign entanglements, "grow up to the territory we have already," and strive for national unity. He added that there was no serious threat of attack from Spain or Cuba and, while he supported naval power as a form of insurance, over-insurance was "costly and makes a moral hazard and danger of a conflagration which might burn what we have not protected." In a second article titled "Empire Can Wait," he pointed to historical examples to argue expansion created variation in the thought and needs of a country and that unassimilated populations would inevitably create a strain on American institutions. He further arraigned the press for feeding public interest in "prurient details of crime" in Cuba and Turkey in an effort to influence foreign policy.

Initially, Reed and President McKinley agreed on the issue. McKinley actively sought a peaceful solution to the Cuban Revolution and Reed gave him full support. However, after the publication of the De Lôme Letter and the sinking of the USS Maine in Havana harbor on February 15, 1898, public opinion rapidly turned against peace and in favor of a declaration of war. Reed refused to believe the Maine was intentionally sunk by Spain, a position he maintained until his death. On March 8, Joe Cannon (as chairman of Appropriations) introduced a bill at the behest of McKinley to appropriate $50 million (approximately $1.605×10^{9} in 2024) for defense, and it received almost unanimous support. Reed clung to hope that war could be avoided, and his suppression of a resolution to recognize Cuban independence aroused resentment throughout the country. Though public opinion was growing in favor of war, the question of Cuban independence remained considerably more controversial. A war resolution passed on April 19 with only six votes against. Reed was quoted as telling one of the six, "I envy you the luxury of your vote. I was where I could not do it."

Reed's political position became increasingly fraught following the easy American victory at Manila Bay on May 1, as the aims of American expansion grew to include strategic positions in the Pacific. The Newlands Resolution, which would prove Reed's signal defeat, was introduced in the House on May 4. For three weeks, the Speaker blocked its consideration but, when opinion in the House became overwhelming and a petition for its introduction was signed by Republican members, Reed surrendered. On June 2, it was announced that the resolution would be passed before adjournment. Reed was re-elected in 1898 and retained the Speaker's gavel but became increasingly isolated during the debate over the ratification of the Treaty of Paris and imperial expansion, especially after the loss of three key allies: Theodore Roosevelt and Henry Cabot Lodge were ardent expansionists, and Nelson Dingley died on January 13, 1899. After meeting with President McKinley on Jekyll Island in the spring, Reed finally announced on April 19 that he would retire from public life and become senior partner in the firm of Simpson, Thatcher and Barnum. His resignation was made formally effective on September 4.

== Personal life ==
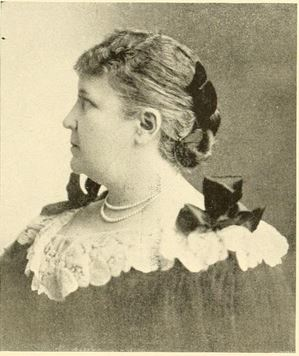
Susan P. Reed (née Merrill)

In 1871, Reed married his childhood friend and classmate Susan P. Merrill. She was born at Center Harbor, New Hampshire, on Lake Winnipesaukee to the Rev. Samuel H. Merrill, a well-known Congregational clergyman, and Hannah Prentis, a native of New Hampshire. She had one brother, Edward P. Merrill, and one sister, who resided in Lowell, Massachusetts. They had one daughter, Katherine Reed Balentine, who was born January 23, 1875. Katherine later started a monthly magazine called The Yellow Ribbon, which promoted women's suffrage.

Reed was well known for his acerbic wit (asked if his party might nominate him for president, he noted, "They could do worse, and they probably will"). His size, standing at over 6 feet in height and weighing over 300 lbs (136 kg), was also a distinguishing factor. Reed was a member of the social circle that included intellectuals and politicians Henry Cabot Lodge, Theodore Roosevelt, Henry Adams, and John Hay. Upon his retirement from public life, he also counted Mark Twain among his personal friends.

In 1894, Reed published his handbook on parliamentary procedure, titled Reed's Rules: A Manual of General Parliamentary Law, which was, at the time, a very popular text on the subject and is still in use in the legislature of the State of Washington.

== Death and legacy ==
In early December 1902, Reed was in Washington on business with the United States Supreme Court. On December 2, Reed visited his former colleagues in the Ways and Means Committee room. Later that day, he became ill while in another room of the Capitol and was rushed to the nearby Arlington Hotel. In the Arlington, Reed was diagnosed with Bright's disease complicated by appendicitis; he died five days later at 12:10 am on December 7 with his wife and daughter at his bedside. A Gridiron Club dinner was occurring at the same time in the same hotel as Reed's death. When news broke of Reed's passing, "the diners rose to drink a silent toast to a man who had so often been among them".

In announcing his death to the House, Representative James S. Sherman said, "He was so great, his service to his country so valuable, that it seems we may fitly depart from what is the usual custom of the House when one not in public life dies." The House thus adopted a resolution honoring Reed as "a distinguished statesman, a lofty patriot, a cultured scholar, an incisive writer, a unique orator, an unmatched debater, a master of logic, wit, satire, the most famous of the world's parliamentarians, the great and representative citizen of the American Republic." Henry Cabot Lodge eulogized him as "a good hater, who detested shams, humbugs and pretense above all else." Mark Twain wrote of him, "He was transparently honest and honorable, there was no furtiveness about him, and whoever came to know him trusted him and was not disappointed. He was wise, he was shrewd and alert, he was a clear and capable thinker, a logical reasoner, and a strong and convincing speaker."

He was buried in Evergreen Cemetery in Portland, Maine. His will was executed by his good friend, the financier Augustus G. Paine Sr. He left his family an estate of $200,000 (approximately $5,849,883 in 2024).

=== Memorials ===
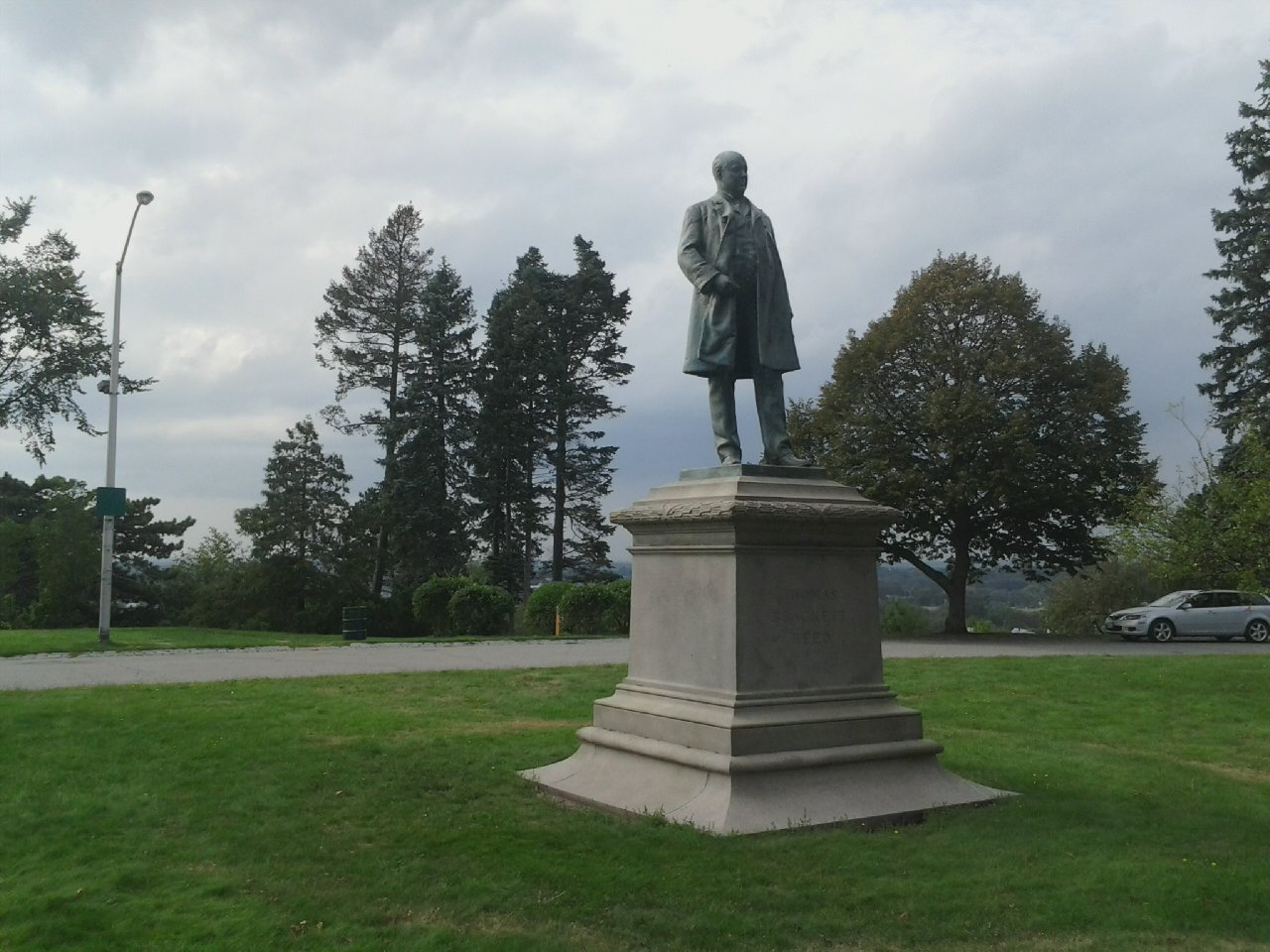
Statue of Reed on Portland, Maine's Western Promenade in September 2011.

There is a Reed House at Bowdoin College.

His home town of Portland, Maine, erected a statue of him at the corner of Western Promenade and Pine Street in a ceremony on August 31, 1910. His last home in Portland has been designated a National Historic Landmark in his honor.

=== Biographies ===
Biographies of the life of Thomas Brackett Reed have been written by Samuel W. McCall (Houghton Mifflin Company, 1914), William A. Robinson (Dodd, Mead & Company, 1930), and Richard Stanley Offenberg (Ph.D. diss., New York University, 1963). In 2011, finance writer James Grant wrote a biography entitled, Mr. Speaker! The Life and Times of Thomas B. Reed: the Man who Broke the Filibuster. The most recent scholarly biography is Thomas Brackett Reed: The Gilded Age Speaker Who Made the Rules for American Politics by Robert J. Klotz (University Press of Kansas, 2022). One chapter of Barbara Tuchman's The Proud Tower is substantially devoted to Reed's 1890 efforts to abolish the disappearing quorum.

== Bibliography ==
=== Biographies ===
- Grant, James (2011). Mr. Speaker!: The Life and Times of Thomas B. Reed, The Man Who Broke the Filibuster. Simon and Schuster. ISBN 9781416544944.
- Klotz, Robert J. (2022). Thomas Brackett Reed: The Gilded Age Speaker Who Made the Rules for American Politics. University Press of Kansas. ISBN 978-0-7006-3332-6.
- McCall, Samuel W. (1914). The Life of Thomas Brackett Reed. New York: Houghton Mifflin Company.
- Robinson, William A. (1930). Thomas B. Reed, Parliamentarian. New York: Dodd, Mead & Co.

=== Other books ===
- Mooney, Booth (1964). Mr. Speaker: Four Men who Shaped the United States House of Representatives. Chicago: Follett Co.
- Strahan, Randall (2007). Leading Representatives: The Agency of Leaders in the Politics of the U.S. House. Johns Hopkins University Press. ISBN 978-0-8018-8691-1.
- Thomas, Evan (2010). The War Lovers. -Little, Brown and Co.
- Tuchman, Barbara Wertheim (1996). The Proud Tower: a Portrait of the World before the War, 1890–1914. New York: Ballantine Books. ISBN 978-0-345-40501-2.

=== Articles and journals ===
- Hazard, Wendy (March 2004). "Thomas Brackett Reed, Civil Rights, and the Fight for Fair Elections". Maine History. 42 (1): 1–23.
- Valelly, Richard M. (October 2009). "The Reed Rules and Republican Party Building A New Look" (PDF). Studies in American Political Development. 23 (2): 115–42. doi:10.1017/S0898588X09990022.

=== Primary sources ===
- Reed, Thomas B.; Roosevelt, Theodore (1994). Williams, R. Hal (ed.). ""Dear Tom,"' "Dear Theodore": The Letters of Theodore Roosevelt and Thomas B. Reed". Theodore Roosevelt Association Journal. 20 (3–4): 3–22.

Legal offices
Preceded by William P. Frye	Maine Attorney General; 1870–1872	Succeeded by Harris M. Plaisted
U.S. House of Representatives
Preceded by John H. Burleigh	Member of the U.S. House of Representatives from Maine's 1st congressional district March 4, 1877 – September 4, 1899	Succeeded by Amos L. Allen
Political offices
Preceded by John G. Carlisle	Speaker of the U.S. House of Representatives; December 2, 1889 – March 3, 1891	Succeeded by Charles F. Crisp
Preceded by Charles F. Crisp	Speaker of the U.S. House of Representatives; December 2, 1895 – March 3, 1897; March 15, 1897 – March 3, 1899	Succeeded by David B. Henderson
