= John Lynch (Maine politician) =

American politician

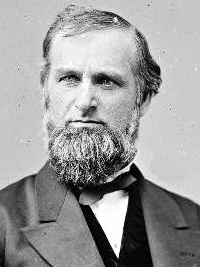

Member of the U.S. House of Representatives from Maine's 1st district
- In office March 4, 1865 – March 3, 1873
- Preceded by: Lorenzo D. M. Sweat
- Succeeded by: John H. Burleigh

Member of the Maine House of Representatives
- In office 1862-1864

Personal details
- Born: February 18, 1825 Portland, Maine, U.S.
- Died: July 21, 1892 (aged 67) Portland, Maine, U.S.
- Party: Republican
- Profession: Politician, merchant, manufacturer, publisher

John Lynch (February 18, 1825 – July 21, 1892) was a nineteenth-century politician, merchant, manufacturer and newspaper publisher from Maine.

Born in Portland, Maine, Lynch attended public schools as a child and graduated from Portland High School in 1842. He engaged in mercantile pursuits, was manager of the Portland Daily Press in 1862 and was a member of the Maine House of Representatives from 1862 to 1864. He was elected a Republican to the United States House of Representatives in 1864, serving from 1865 to 1873. There, Lynch served as chairman of the Committee on Expenditures in the Department of the Navy from 1869 to 1871 and of the Committee on Expenditures in the Department of the Treasury from 1871 to 1873. Afterward, he permanently moved to Washington, D.C. where he established the Washington Daily Union in 1877 and engaged in the manufacturing of bricks and drain pipes. Lynch died while on a visit to Portland, Maine on July 21, 1892, and was interred in Evergreen Cemetery in Portland.

U.S. House of Representatives
Preceded by Lorenzo D. M. Sweat	Member of the U.S. House of Representatives from Maine's 1st congressional district March 4, 1865 – March 3, 1873	Succeeded by John H. Burleigh
