= Belford v. Scribner =

- Supreme Court of the United States

Submitted March 24, 1892 Decided April 11, 1892
- Full case name: Belford v. Scribner
- Citations: 144 U.S. 488 (more) 12 S. Ct. 734; 36 L. Ed. 514

Holding
- 1) A copyright is held by default with the person whose name it was taken out in, regardless of potential conflicts with state law. 2) If a work contains a mixture of original and copyright infringing material, but it is so intermingled as to be inseparable, then the copyright holder may take all profits from the work.

Court membership
- Chief Justice Melville Fuller Associate Justices Stephen J. Field · John M. Harlan; Horace Gray · Samuel Blatchford; Lucius Q. C. Lamar II · David J. Brewer; Henry B. Brown

Case opinion
- Majority: Blatchford, joined by a unanimous court

Belford v. Scribner, 144 U.S. 488 (1892), was a United States Supreme Court case in which the Court held 1) A copyright is held by default with the person whose name it was taken out in, regardless of potential conflicts with state law. 2) If a work contains a mixture of original and copyright infringing material, but it is so intermingled as to be inseparable, then the copyright holder may take all profits from the work.

The work in question was Common Sense in the Household by Marion Harland. Her husband claimed that the copyright and profits derived therefrom belonged to him because the common law of New Jersey asserted that a wife held no share in property gained during a marriage.
