= Pope Manufacturing Co. v. Gormully =

- Supreme Court of the United States

Argued March 9–10, 1892 Decided April 4, 1892
- Full case name: Pope Manufacturing Company v. Gormully
- Citations: 144 U.S. 224 (more) 12 S. Ct. 632; 36 L. Ed. 414; 1892 U.S. LEXIS 2074

Case history
- Prior: 34 F. 877, 877-78 (C.C.N.D. Ill. 1888)

Court membership
- Chief Justice Melville Fuller Associate Justices Stephen J. Field · John M. Harlan; Horace Gray · Samuel Blatchford; Lucius Q. C. Lamar II · David J. Brewer; Henry B. Brown

Case opinion
- Majority: Brown, joined by a unanimous court

Pope Manufacturing Co. v. Gormully, 144 U.S. 224 (1892), was an early United States Supreme Court decision refusing, on public policy grounds, to enforce an agreement not to contest patent validity. The Supreme Court later relied on Pope in Lear, Inc. v. Adkins as authority in support of overruling the doctrine of licensee estoppel. That doctrine had prohibited patent licensees from challenging the validity of patents under which they had been licensed.

== Background ==
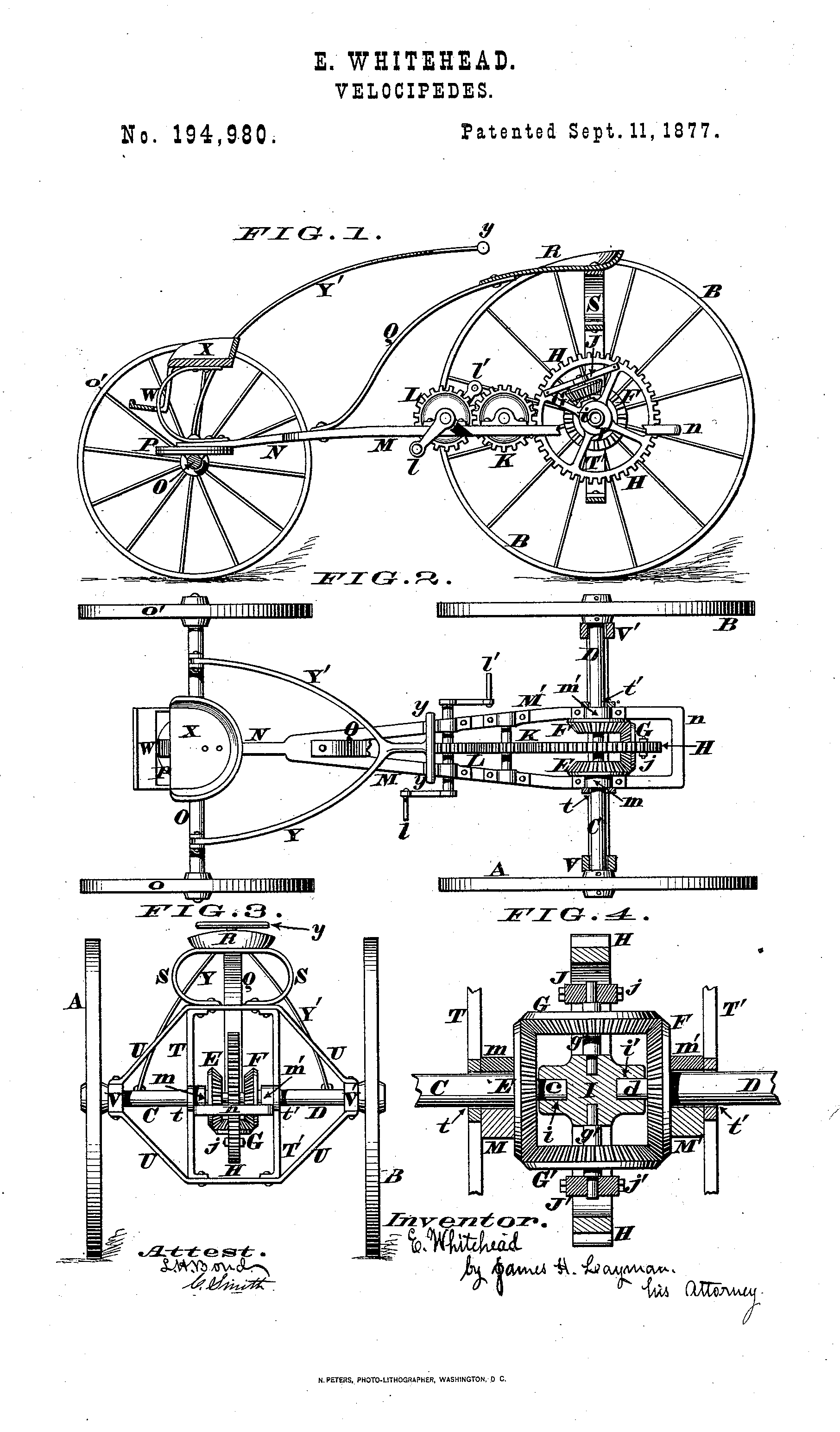
Drawing from one of Pope's patents licensed to Gormully

Pope owned a large number of patents relating to bicycles, tricycles, and similar vehicles, which it licensed to Gormully. The license agreement provided that Gormully could make bicycles of 52-inch size and larger, "of certain grades, style, and finish," to be sold at a specified price, and that Gormully, even after termination of the license, "would not manufacture, sell, or deal in bicycles, tricycles, or velocipedes containing certain features or devices covered by certain other patents" and would not "directly or indirectly, dispute or contest the validity of said letters patent."

Gormully later violated the contract by "constructing bicycles of a kind prohibited by the contract," and Pope sued for an injunction compelling Gormully not to make the prohibited bicycles. The trial court refused relief. It stated:

We think there can be no doubt that this contract, if enforced according to its letter and spirit, would act oppressively and unjustly upon this defendant. . . . [T]his contract seems to be so oppressive, and so unjust and inequitable in its terms, and so contrary to sound public policy, that it ought not to be enforced in a court of equity.

Pope then appealed to the Supreme Court.

== Ruling of Supreme Court ==
Justice Brown delivered the unanimous opinion of the Court.

The Court stated the general principle as to freedom of contract as follows: "Ordinarily the law leaves to parties the right to make such contracts as they please, demanding, however, that they shall not require either party to do an illegal thing, and that they shall not be against public policy or in restraint of trade." Gormully argued, however, that this contract is objectionable as a restraint of trade, because it was "an attempt to fetter the defendant from importing or making bicycles, in which he might otherwise have a perfect right to deal, and thus foreclose himself from the ability to earn an honest living in his chosen calling." The Court said that it saw the real question as "whether the defendant can estop himself from disputing patents which may be wholly void, or to which the plaintiff may have no shadow of title."

The Court then turned to the public policy at stake here: "It is as important to the public that competition should not be repressed by worthless patents, as that the patentee of a really valuable invention should be protected in his monopoly." That factor, together with what the Court perceived as the oppressiveness to the defendant of the contract, led the Court to conclude that "we are clearly of the opinion that it [the contract] is of such a character that the plaintiff has no right to call upon a court of equity to give it the relief it has sought to obtain in this suit."
