= Lau Ow Bew v. United States =

- Supreme Court of the United States

Argued January 14, 1892 Decided March 14, 1892
- Full case name: Lau Ow Bew v. United States
- Citations: 144 U.S. 47 (more) 12 S. Ct. 517; 36 L. Ed. 340

Court membership
- Chief Justice Melville Fuller Associate Justices Stephen J. Field · John M. Harlan; Horace Gray · Samuel Blatchford; Lucius Q. C. Lamar II · David J. Brewer; Henry B. Brown

Case opinion
- Majority: Fuller, joined by unanimous

Lau Ow Bew v. United States, 144 U.S. 47 (1892), was a United States Supreme Court case. Occurring at the beginning of the era of Chinese Exclusion as well as the formation of the United States courts of appeals, the case set precedents for the interpretation of the rights of Chinese merchants as well as the jurisdiction of the new courts. The ruling relied heavily on the Burlingame Treaty of 1868, the Angell Treaty of 1880, the Chinese Exclusion Act of 1882 and the amendments to the Act in 1884, as well as the Evarts Act of 1891. The case helped to establish not only the rights of the Chinese merchant class, but also informed future cases about the power of the Circuit Court of Appeals as well as the perception of Chinese immigrants.

== Background ==
In 1890, Lau Ow Bew, a Chinese merchant who had resided in San Francisco for seventeen years traveled to China to visit relatives “with the intention of returning as soon as possible to [the United States]” (Lau Ow Bew). Even though Bew possessed proof of his merchant status from the United States, he neglected to obtain proof of his merchant status from the Chinese government before returning. As a result, he was not allowed to reenter the United States, due to a new provision in section 6 of the Chinese Exclusion Act amended in 1884 (Lau Ow Bew). The case was originally heard by the Circuit Court of the United States for the Northern District Court of California which determined that Bew could not be admitted into the country without the certificate of permission from the Chinese government (United States. Congress). Lau Ow Bew filed for a writ of Habeas Corpus and was denied. Circuit Court of Appeals for the Ninth Circuit affirmed the original ruling. The Supreme Court filed a writ of certiorari, and the Supreme Court heard the case in January, 1892.

=== Prior Treaties and Acts ===
The Burlingame and Angell Treaties of 1868 and 1880, respectively, outlined the rights of immigrants and emigrants between China and the United States. The Burlingame Treaty emphasized the “inalienable right of man to change his home and allegiance” as well as the “mutual advantage of free migration and emigration of [Chinese and United States] citizens” (United States Department of States, “English and Chinese”). After experiencing an influx of Chinese laborers, the United States proposed the Angell Treaty which recognized the right of the United States to limit the immigration of Chinese laborers in order to protect the United States economy (United States Department of State, “Angell Treaty”). Importantly, the treaty did not limit the movement of merchants and even accorded merchants with “all the rights, privileges, immunities and exemptions which are accorded to citizens and subjects of the most favored nation” (United States Department of State, Angell Treaty).

The Chinese Exclusion Act of May 1882 implemented the limitation permitted by the Angell treaty, by barring Chinese laborers from entering the United States. Amended in 1884, section 6 of the Act requires a certificate of permission from the Chinese government for all Chinese immigrants to enter the United States as “sole permissible evidence” (United States. Congress). The certificate must be written in English, or accompanied by an English translation include basic information about the person attempting to enter the United States (United States. Congress).

== Case proceedings ==
Chief Justice Fuller delivered the opinion of the court, focusing on whether the court had jurisdiction in the case as well as whether Bew might enter the country without the certificate of permission from China.

The Evarts Act created the Circuit Courts of Appeals to act as an intermediary between the Circuit Courts and the Supreme Court (“Landmark Judicial Legislation). That the Supreme Court issued a writ of certiorari granted the court jurisdiction it otherwise would not have had due to the new Act (Lau Ow Bew).

To determine whether Bew might reenter the country lacking the specified paperwork, Fuller examines three issues.

Two precedent cases, both decided before the 1884 amendments to the Chinese Exclusion Act, provide skepticism toward the necessity of the paperwork. Low Yam Chow in the Circuit Court for the District of California in 1882 found that “the certificate mentioned in [section 6] is…not required as a means of restricting [Chinese merchants] coming” as that would violate the freedom of movement outlined in the Burlingame and Angell treaties (Lau Ow Bew). In re Ho King also found that “the certificate…was not the only competent evidence that a Chinese person is not a laborer” (Lau Ow Bew). Considering these findings, Fuller writes that asking a foreign government to certify all of the components stipulated by the amendments is particularly onerous.

Language used within the Act itself relieves Bew of the burden to demonstrate the certificate of permission from the Chinese government. Section 6 states that persons “who shall be about to come to the United States” must obtain the certificate of permission from the Chinese government, or in other words, “those who are about to come into the United States for the first time” (Lau Ow Bew). As Bew had been living in the United States for seventeen years, the language of the Act does not apply to Bew's case. Additionally, Fuller holds that immigrants should not have to fear that travel abroad means the potential loss of house and home (Lau Ow Bew)

Lastly, Lau Ow Bew's status as a merchant affords him “all…rights, privileges and immunities enjoyed in this country by the citizenry of subjects of the ‘most favored nation’” as set forth by the Burlingame and Angell treaties (Lau Ow Bew). Thus the court finds it is unlawful to withhold from Lau Ow Bew his rights to Habeas Corpus.

In the end, the Supreme Court held that “Lau Ow Bew [was]…unlawfully restrained of his liberty.” The Supreme Court reversed the decision of the Circuit Court of Appeals for the Ninth Circuit, and remands the decision to the Circuit Court of the United States for the Northern District of California, “with directions to reverse its judgment and discharge the petitioner” (Lau Ow Bew).

== Implications ==
The ruling made in Lau Ow Bew v. United States as well as Fuller's opinion helped to inform legal rulings concerning the newly created Circuit Courts of Appeals under the Evart's Act as well as immigration rulings at the turn of the century.

In the years following Lau Ow Bew, many questions arose concerning the power of the Circuit Courts of Appeals. The American Law Review of 1892 cites the Fuller opinion to define the scope of the Circuit Court of Appeals and when the Supreme Court might hear a case (Murfree, 550, 552, 553). Likewise, the Yale Law Review, also published in 1892, examines Lau Ow Bew as an example of when a writ of certiorari might be used by the Supreme Court to hear a case (Foster, 101–103). Thus, the case proved important for interpreting the power given to the newly created Circuit Courts of Appeal under the Evart's Act.

Turn of the century courts and scholars also used Lau Ow Bew to discuss the rights of immigrants, especially Chinese immigrants, during the age of Chinese exclusion. An article in the American Bar Association Journal published in 1930 uses the case to assert that immigrants may use the power of the courts in their favor when legislation is wielded against them (Kohler, “Disability,” 3). Not only did Lau Ow Bew demonstrate how an immigrant might use the courts in their favor, but it also established ways in which people perceived immigrants. For example, an article in the American Journal of International Law published in 1930 cites the Fuller Opinion to promote the idea that the place a person lives necessarily engenders allegiance from that person (Cutler, 227). In these ways Lau Ow Bew helped inform the perception of immigrants in the United States.

== Sources ==
- Cutler, John Ward. “The Treatment of Foreigners: In Relation to the Draft Convention and Conference of 1929.” The American Journal of International Law 27.2 (Apr., 1993): 225–246. JSTOR. Web. 22 Sep. 2013.
- Foster, Roger. “Recent Decisions under the Evarts Act.” The Yale Law Journal 1.3 (Feb., 1892): 95–105. JSTOR. Web. 22 Sep. 2013.
- Kohler, Max J., “Legal Disabilities of Aliens in the United States.” American Bar Association Journal 16.1 (1930): 113–117. HeinOnline. Web. 22 Sep. 2013.
- “Landmark Judicial Legislation, Establishment of the U.S. Circuit Court of Appeals.” History of the Federal Judiciary. Federal Judicial Center. n.d. Web. 29 Sep. 2013.
- Lau Ow Bew. v. United States. 144 U.S. 47. Supreme Court of the United States. 1892. Lexis Nexus Academic. Web. 27 Sep. 2013.
- Murfree, Wm. L. Jr. “Jurisdiction and Practice of the Federal Courts of Appeal.” American Law Review 26.4 (1892): 544–554. HeinOnline. Web. 22 Sep. 2013.
- United States. Congress. House. “Chinese Exclusion Act of 1884.” The Avalon Project. Yale Law School. 2008. Web. 29 Sep. 2013.
- United States. Department of State. “Angell Treaty.” Treaty Doc. Federal Judicial Center. n.d. Web. 29 Sep. 2013.
- United States. Department of State. “English and Chinese Text of the Burlingame Treaty 1868.” Treaty Doc. American Memory. n.d. Web. 29 Sep. 2013.
