= USS Sibyl =

History

United States
- Ordered: as Hartford
- Laid down: date unknown
- Launched: 1863, in Cincinnati, Ohio
- Acquired: 27 April 1864, at Cincinnati
- Commissioned: 16 June 1864, at Mound City, Illinois
- Decommissioned: 31 July 1865 at Mount City
- Stricken: 1865 (est.)
- Fate: Sold, 17 August 1865

General characteristics
- Displacement: 176 tons
- Length: not known
- Beam: not known
- Draught: not known
- Propulsion: steam engine; side wheel-propelled
- Speed: not known
- Complement: not known
- Armament: two 24-pounder guns; two 30-pounder Parrott rifles

USS Sibyl was a wooden-hull steamer outfitted with heavy guns, purchased by the Union Navy during the American Civil War.

Sibyl was used by the Union Navy primarily as a dispatch boat in the blockade of ports and waterways of the Confederate States of America. She carried messages (dispatches) between ships and shore; but, with her heavy guns, she was also prepared to act as a gunboat if the need presented itself.

== Built at Cincinnati, Ohio, in 1863 ==
Sibyl—a wooden-hulled, side wheel steamer built at Cincinnati, Ohio, as Hartford in 1863—was purchased by the Navy at Cincinnati on 27 April 1864; renamed Sibyl on 26 May 1864; and commissioned at Mound City, Illinois, on 16 June 1864, Acting Volunteer Lieutenant Henry H. Gorringe in command.

== Civil War service ==
Sibyl was based at Cairo, Illinois, and used as a dispatch boat for Rear Admiral David Dixon Porter, the commander of the Mississippi Squadron.

Her first cruise began early in July and took her downriver as far as Natchez, Mississippi, delivering messages to Navy ships en route. She continued this type of service through the end of the Civil War, gathering intelligence of Confederate activity as she steamed up and down the river.

== Post-war deactivation and subsequent career ==
She was decommissioned at Mound City on 31 July 1865, was sold at public auction there on 17 August 1865 to R. J. Trunstoll, and was redocumented as Comet on 28 September 1865. After more than a decade of mercantile service, the ship was abandoned in 1876.

== See also ==
- Anaconda Plan
- Mississippi Squadron
