= Katherine Reed Balentine =

American suffragist (1875–1934)

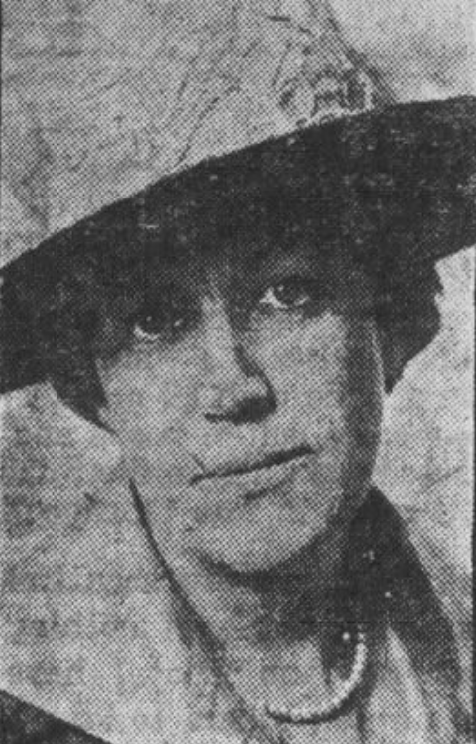
- Katherine Reed Balentine, from a 1917 newspaper
- Born: January 23, 1875; Portland, Maine
- Died: September 17, 1934 (aged 59); San Diego, California
- Other names: Katharine Reed Balentine
- Occupations: Suffragist, editor
- Father: Thomas Brackett Reed

Katherine Reed Balentine (January 23, 1875 – September 17, 1934) was an American suffragist and the founder of The Yellow Ribbon, a suffrage magazine.

== Early life ==
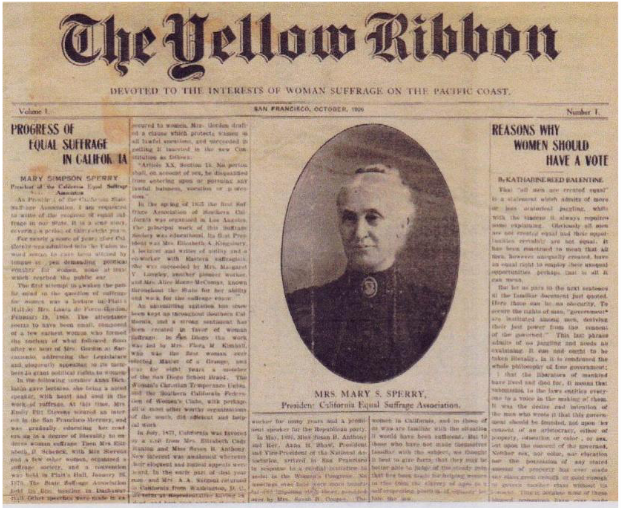
The Yellow Ribbon, October 1909

Katherine "Kitty" Reed was born in 1878 in Portland, Maine, to Susan Prentice Merrill Reed and Thomas Brackett Reed. Her father was in his first term as a Republican member of the U.S. House of Representatives from Maine's 1st congressional district. He eventually became Speaker of the House, and was on the record as opposed to women's suffrage, making his daughter's very public activism in favor of suffrage more newsworthy.

== Suffrage work and The Yellow Ribbon ==
In 1906, Katherine Reed Balentine founded The Yellow Ribbon magazine, a monthly suffrage publication. The Yellow Ribbon magazine was later known as Western Woman. This magazine was a statewide California newspaper, based in Monterey.

Reed was a leading figure in the National American Woman Suffrage Association (NAWSA); in 1907, she was part of a NAWSA delegation which met with President Theodore Roosevelt. In 1908, she spoke before the national NAWSA convention in Buffalo, on the theme "Woman Suffrage at Home and Abroad". She led the Maine branch of NAWSA from 1916 to 1917, bringing her experience with the California suffrage movement to Maine's effort. In 1917 she was quoted as saying, "there is nothing radical about equal suffrage."

== Personal life ==
Reed married Army colonel Arthur Trumbo Balentine in 1905. He served on the staff of U.S. military commander John J. Pershing, and was based at the Presidio of San Francisco before he resigned in 1908. After their marriage the couple moved to San Francisco. They had a son, Thomas Reed Balentine, and a daughter, Katherine Balentine Jenney. Katherine Reed Balentine died in 1934, at the age of 59, in San Diego. She is buried in Evergreen Cemetery in Portland.
