= Burr Churchill Miller =

American sculptor

Burr Churchill Miller (September 16, 1870 - January 14, 1925) was an American sculptor remembered for his memorial statues of General Nicholas Herkimer in Herkimer, New York and Thomas Brackett Reed in Portland, Maine. He was born in Herkimer, New York, the son of Senator Warner Miller, died in Wilkes-Barre, Pennsylvania, and is buried in the Oak Hill Cemetery in Herkimer. Miller was a student of Paul Wayland Bartlett and won an Honorable Mention in the Paris Salon of 1907.
