= Joseph Homan Manley =

American politician

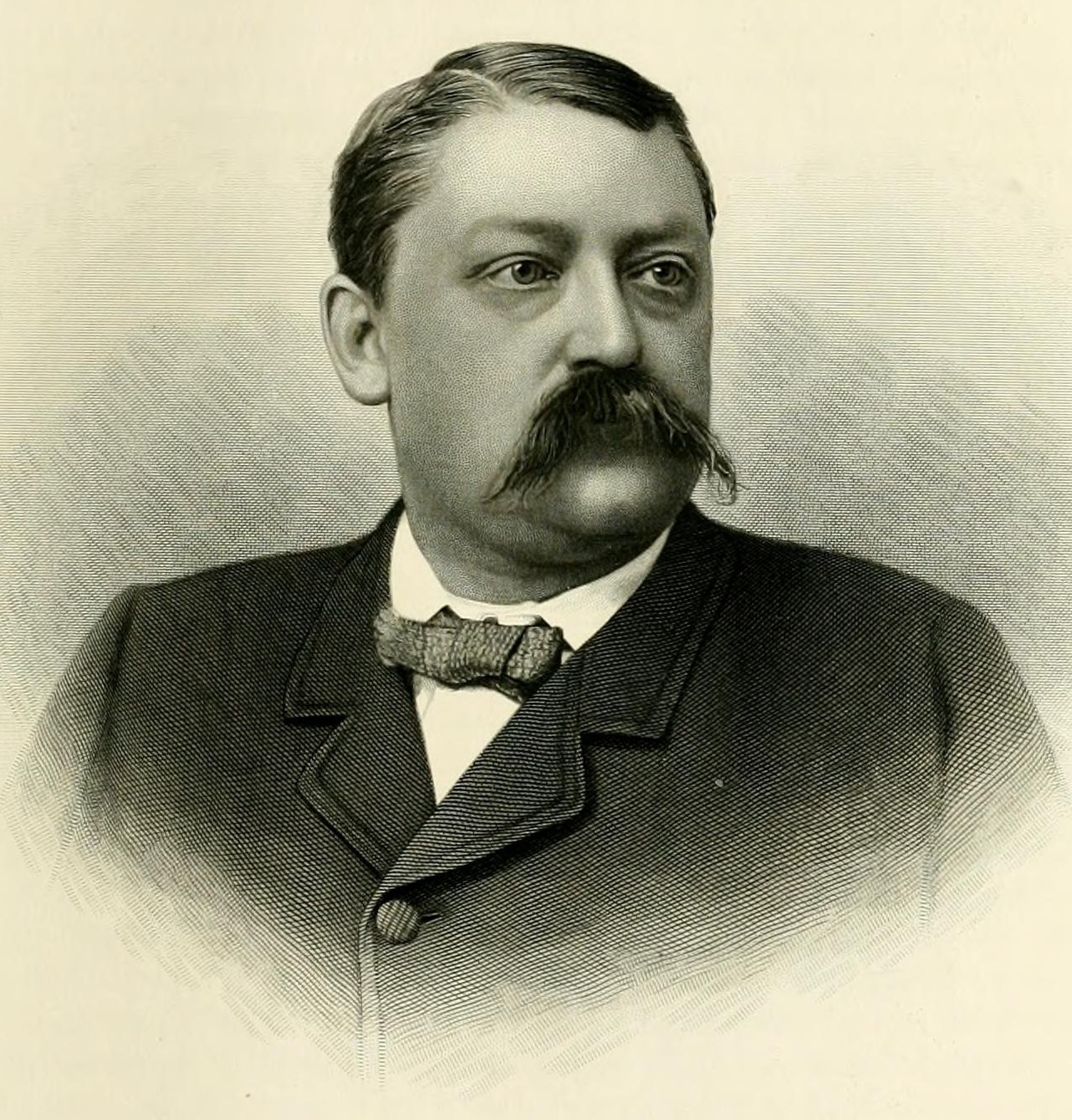
Joseph H. Manley, Maine political figure.

Joseph Homan Manley (October 13, 1842–1905) was an American Republican Party official (chairman of the party's National Executive Committee 1894–96) and close associate of Maine Republican politician and presidential candidate James G. Blaine.

== Biography ==
Born in Bangor, Maine, Manley first attended school in Farmington, Maine, and subsequently studied law in Boston and graduated from Albany Law School in 1863.

In 1866 he was president of the Augusta, Maine City Council, where he first became associated with Blaine. From 1869 to 1876, he was an agent of the Internal Revenue Service, posted in various cities around the northeast, and in 1876-78 was an agent of the Pennsylvania Railroad in its tax dealings with the Federal government.

Manley then returned to Maine and, purchasing a half-interest in the newspaper The Maine Farmer (formally edited by his father), made it into a major voice for Blaine-style Republicanism. Blaine subsequently secured Manley's appointment as Augusta's U.S. postmaster (an important federal post under the then-existing spoils system). The large Richardsonian Romanesque U.S. Post Office Building in Augusta is one of his legacies.

Manley subsequently became Blaine's right-hand man on the Maine Republican State Committee, on which he served 1881–1900, and which he chaired for 15 of those years.

Manley was the Maine delegate on National Republican Committee (1887–1900), and often served on the Republican National Executive Committee (a nine-member steering committee appointed by the Chairman of the NRC). In 1894, then-NRC Chairman Thomas Henry Carter resigned the Executive Committee Chairmanship in favor of Manley, while retaining nominal control of the NRC. This set the stage for Manley to personally manage the 1896 presidential candidacy of Thomas Brackett Reed, who was defeated for the Republican nomination by William McKinley. McKinley's victory in the convention gave Mark Hanna control of the NRC, though Manley stayed on to run the party's New York headquarters, serving as Secretary of the National Committee and chairing various sub-committees until 1900.

Manley also held a variety of state offices, serving in the Maine House of Representatives (1899–1901, and as its Speaker in 1901), and the Maine State Senate (1903–04). His wife was the daughter of a former Maine governor, and his son also became a Republican politico in New York City.

Manley's New York Times obituary describes him as "a national politician who was identified with vast corporate interests".

Manley married the daughter of former Maine governor Samuel Cony and was a driving force behind the building of Cony High School in Augusta.
