= 1952 Maine gubernatorial election =

- September 8, 1952
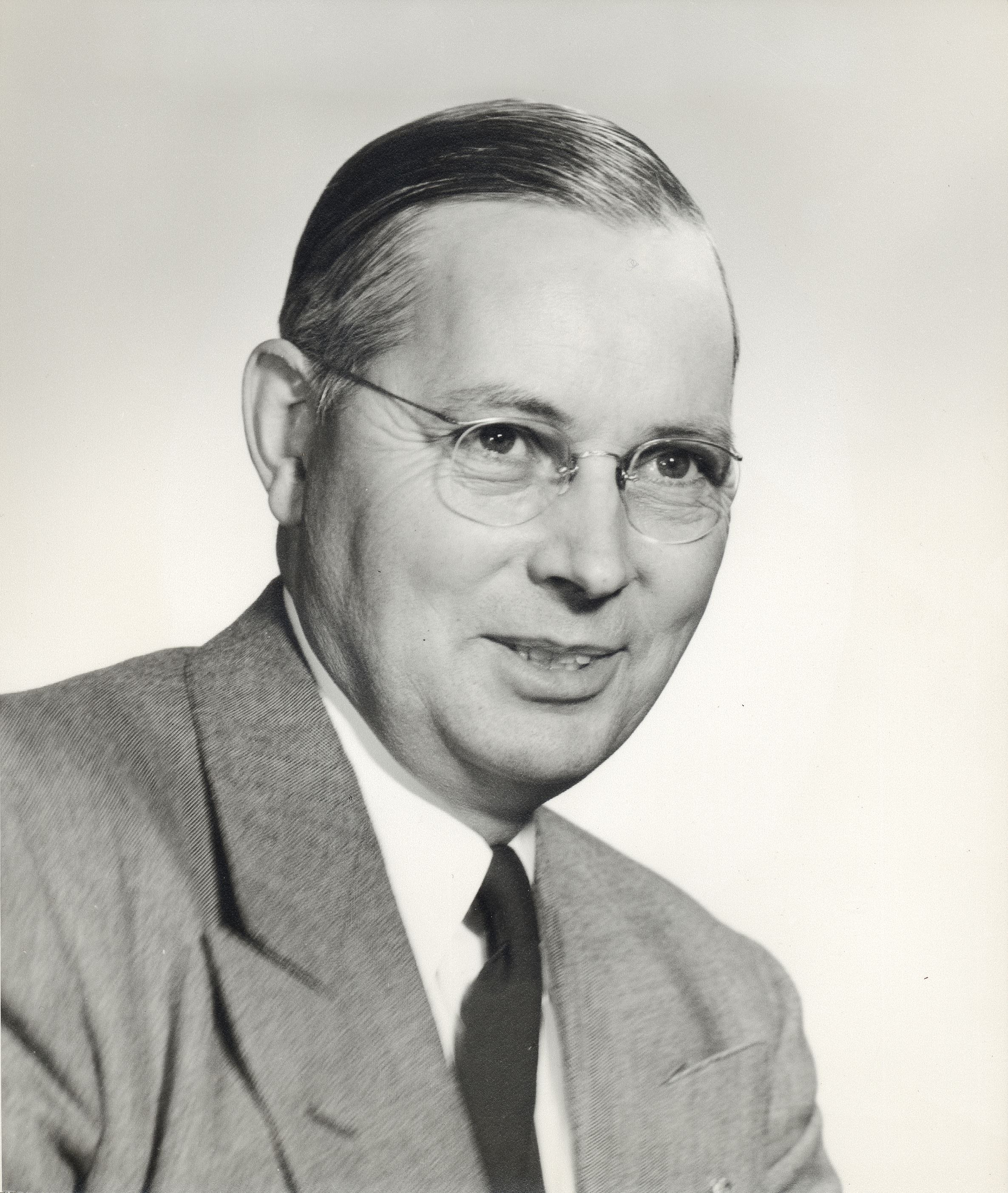

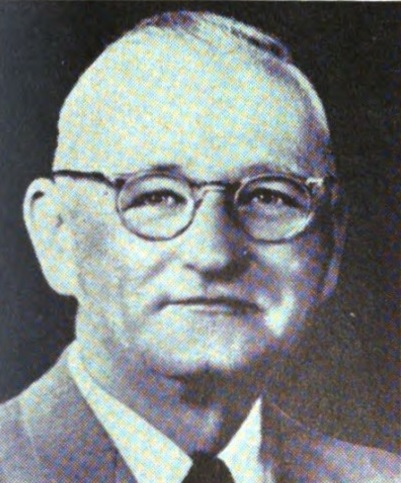

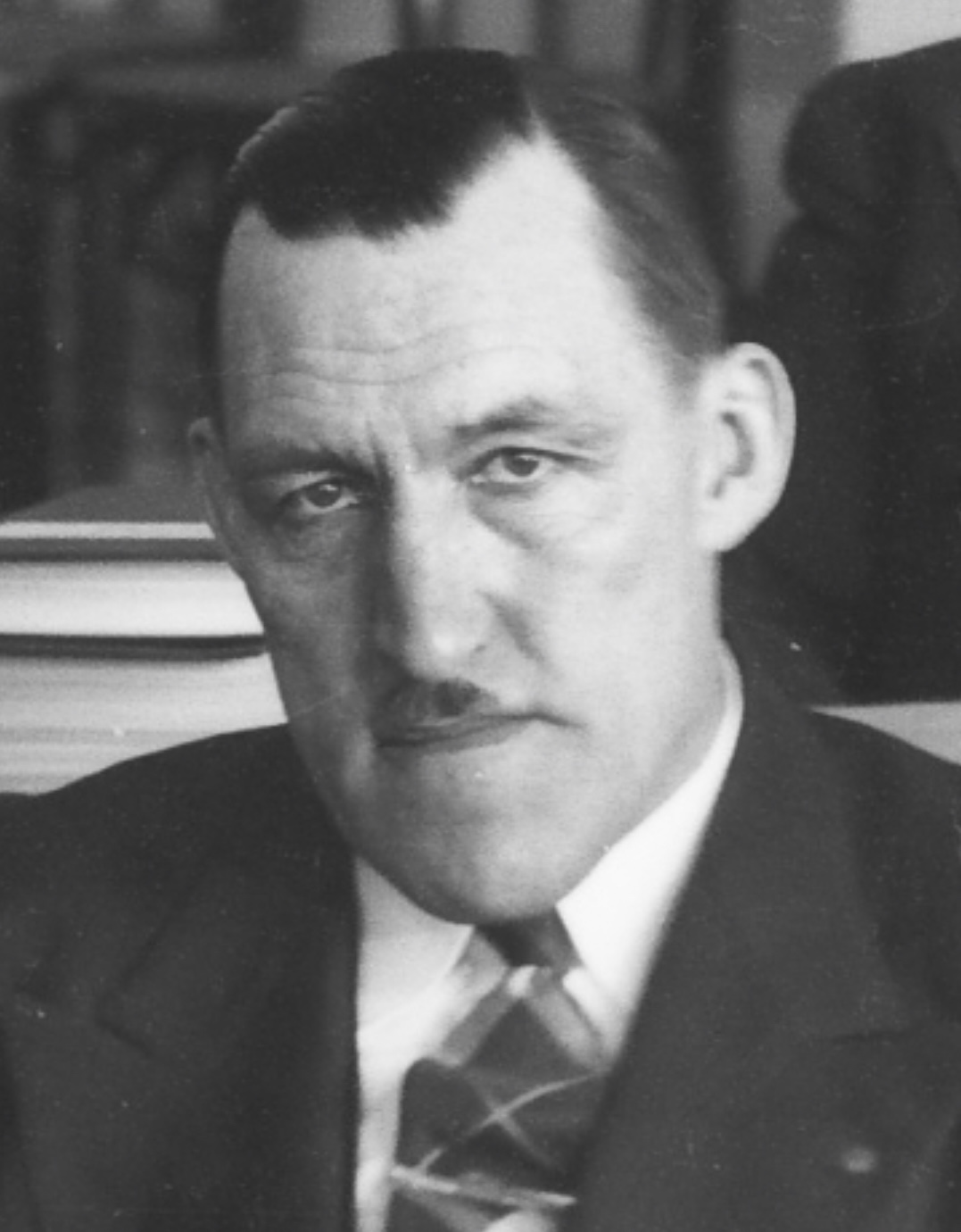
Nominee	Burton M. Cross	James C. Oliver	Neil S. Bishop
Party	Republican	Democratic	Independent Republican
Popular vote	128,532	82,538	35,732
Percentage	52.08%	33.44%	14.48%
- County results Cross: 40–50% 50–60% 60–70% Oliver: 40–50%
Governor before election
Nathaniel Haskell (Note: The previously elected governor was Republican Frederick G. Payne, who was elected to the U.S. Senate in 1952. Payne resigned from the governorship on December 24, 1952, to prepare for his term in the Senate, and was succeeded by Cross, who was President of the State Senate. Since Cross had also been elected Governor, his elected term was scheduled to begin on January 7, 1953. However, at 10:00am on January 6, 1953, Cross's term as Senate President (and therefore Governor) expired. Haskell, as the newly elected president, became Governor until the inaugural ceremony was held at 11:00am the next day.)
Republican
Elected Governor
Burton M. Cross
Republican

The 1952 Maine gubernatorial election took place on September 8, 1952. Republican incumbent Frederick G. Payne was term limited and constitutionally prohibited from seeking a third consecutive term in office; he ran for United States Senate. Maine Senate president Burton M. Cross defeated former Republican U.S. representative James C. Oliver and independent Neil S. Bishop, whom Cross had already defeated in the Republican primary.

Cross' election was the ninth consecutive victory for the Republicans in Maine gubernatorial races. This was the last time that a Maine governor was succeeded by a member of their own party until Democrat Hannah Pingree succeeded fellow Democrat Janet Mills in 2026.

== Republican primary ==
=== Candidates ===
- Neil S. Bishop, former state senator from Augusta
- Burton M. Cross, president of the Maine Senate since 1948
- Leroy F. Hussey, chairman of the Executive Council of Maine

=== Results ===
Republican primary results
Party	Candidate	Votes	%
Republican	Burton M. Cross	54,865	40.38
Republican	Leroy F. Hussey	44,087	32.44
Republican	Neil S. Bishop	36,931	27.18
Total votes		135,883	100.00

== Democratic primary ==
Oliver was unopposed in the Democratic primary.

== General election ==
=== Candidates ===
- Neil S. Bishop, former state senator from Augusta (Independent)
- Burton M. Cross, president of the Maine Senate since 1948 (Republican)
- James C. Oliver, former U.S. representative from South Portland (Democratic)

=== Results ===
1952 Gubernatorial Election, Maine
Party	Candidate	Votes	%	±%
Republican	Burton M. Cross	128,532	52.08%	−
Democratic	James C. Oliver	82,538	33.44%	−
Independent	Neil S. Bishop	35,732	14.48%	−
Majority		45,994	18.64%	

==== Counties that flipped from Republican to Democratic ====
- Androscoggin (largest city: Lewiston)

=== Aftermath ===
The period after the election itself was rather unusual. Cross actually became Governor about two weeks prior to the start of his elected term of office — the outgoing Governor, Frederick G. Payne, had resigned on December 25, 1952, to prepare for his term in the United States Senate. Cross, as President of the Senate became Governor through constitutional succession. Cross himself resigned as Senate President (and Governor) at 10:00 am January 6, 1953 and was replaced for the next 25 hours by Nathaniel Haskell. At 11:00 am on January 7, 1953, Cross' official elected term of office began.

Oliver would remain active in Maine Democratic politics after his defeat, becoming the Democratic nominee for Maine's 1st congressional district in 1954 and 1956, which would see him narrowly defeated both times by incumbent Republican Robert Hale. Oliver would best Hale in 1958 and return to Congress, but would be defeated for re-election in 1960 by Republican Peter A. Garland.

Bishop would remain in the Republican Party, but would cross party lines to back Democratic gubernatorial candidate Edmund Muskie in 1954. After Muskie became a Senator, Bishop would be nominated by the Maine GOP to run against him in the 1970 election — Muskie would defeat Bishop in a landslide.

Cross would be defeated for re-election by Muskie in 1954, becoming the first Republican nominee to lose a Maine gubernatorial election in 20 years. Muskie's victory precipitated the rise of the Maine Democratic Party in what had traditionally been a rock-ribbed Republican state.
