= Governor Cross =

Governor Cross may refer to:

- Burton M. Cross (1902–1998), 61st and 63rd Governor of Maine
- Wilbur Lucius Cross (1862–1948), 71st Governor of Connecticut
