= Simon M. Hamlin =

American politician

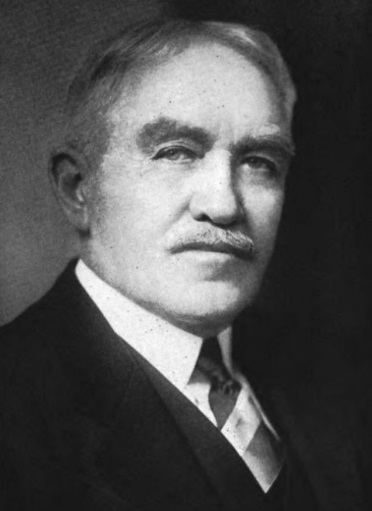

Member of the U.S. House of Representatives from Maine's 1st district
- In office January 3, 1935 – January 3, 1937
- Preceded by: Carroll L. Beedy
- Succeeded by: James C. Oliver

Personal details
- Born: Simon Moulton Hamlin; August 10, 1866 Standish, Maine, US
- Died: July 27, 1939 (aged 72) South Portland, Maine, US
- Resting place: Hamlin Cemetery, Standish (Richville), Maine
- Party: Democratic

Simon Moulton Hamlin (August 10, 1866 – July 27, 1939) was an American educator, businessman and politician who served as a U.S. representative from Maine for one term from 1935 to 1937.

== Early life and career ==
Hamlin was born in Standish (Richville), Cumberland County, Maine, Hamlin attended the public schools, Gorham Normal School, and Bridgton Academy.

He taught school and, in 1900, graduated from Bowdoin College in Brunswick, Maine. He served as superintendent of the South Portland and Cape Elizabeth schools from 1901 to 1925 and as city clerk of South Portland, Maine in 1913. He engaged in the real estate business at South Portland in 1925. He was also interested in farming.

He served as member of the board of registration 1926–1932. He served as mayor in 1933 and 1934.

== Congress ==
Hamlin was elected as a Democrat to the Seventy-fourth Congress (January 3, 1935 - January 3, 1937). He served as chairman of the Committee on Memorials (Seventy-fourth Congress). He was an unsuccessful candidate for reelection in 1936 to the Seventy-fifth Congress.

== Later career and death ==
He resumed the real estate business and farming in South Portland, Maine, until his death there July 27, 1939. He was interred in Hamlin Cemetery, Standish (Richville), Maine.

== See also ==
- List of mayors of South Portland, Maine

U.S. House of Representatives
Preceded by Carroll L. Beedy	Member of the U.S. House of Representatives from Maine's 1st congressional district 1935-1937	Succeeded by James C. Oliver
