= Burton M. Cross =

Governor of Maine (1902–1998)

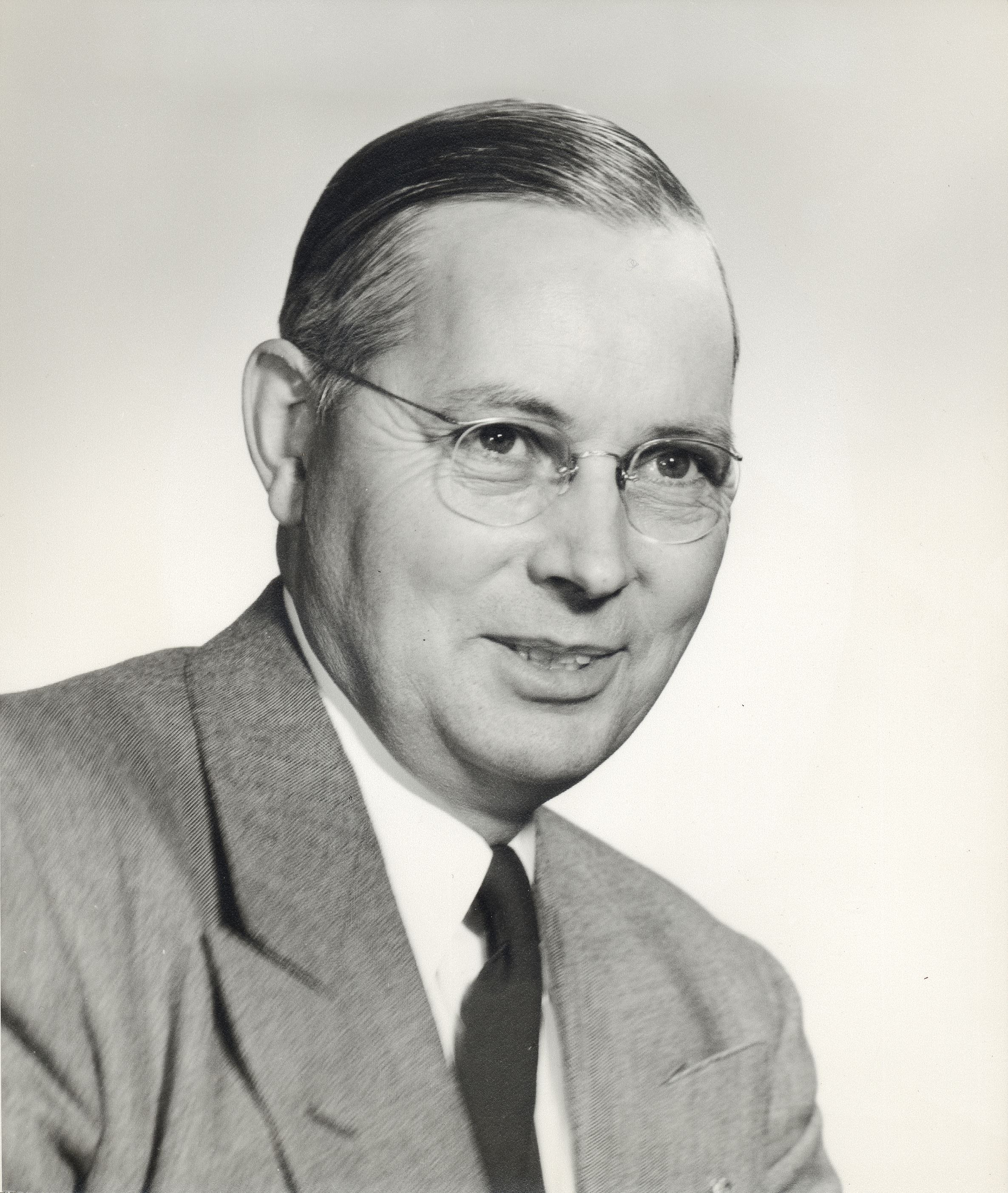

61st and 63rd Governor of Maine
- In office January 7, 1953 – January 5, 1955
- Preceded by: Nathaniel M. Haskell
- Succeeded by: Edmund Muskie
- In office December 24, 1952 – January 6, 1953
- Preceded by: Frederick G. Payne
- Succeeded by: Nathaniel M. Haskell

President of the Maine Senate
- In office 1949-1952
- Preceded by: George D. Varney
- Succeeded by: Nathaniel M. Haskell

Member of the Maine Senate
- In office 1945-1952

Member of the Maine House of Representatives
- In office 1941-1945

Personal details
- Born: November 15, 1902 Augusta, Maine, U.S.
- Died: October 22, 1998 (aged 95) Augusta, Maine, U.S.
- Resting place: Forest Grove Cemetery, Augusta, Maine
- Party: Republican
- Spouse: Olena R. Moulton
- Children: 2
- Profession: Florist; Insurance broker Stock broker

Burton Melvin Cross (November 15, 1902 – October 22, 1998) was an American Republican businessman and politician, the 61st and 63rd governor of Maine, though his two terms were separated by just 25 hours. He also served in the Maine House of Representatives and Maine Senate including as its president.

== Early life and Early Political Career ==
Born in Augusta, Maine on November 15, 1902, Cross graduated from Augusta's Cony High School in 1920, and became a florist in Augusta.

In 1933, Cross won a seat on the Augusta Common Council and in 1937 he was elected to the Board of Aldermen, and he served as presiding officer of both bodies. He won a seat in the Maine House of Representatives in 1941, where he served two terms before winning election to the Maine Senate in 1945. He became majority floor leader in 1947 and served as President of the Senate from 1949 to 1952.

== Governors of Maine ==
In 1952, Cross won the Republican nomination for Governor and went on to defeat Democrat James Oliver in the general election by a substantial margin. Cross actually became Governor about two weeks prior to the start of his elected term of office when Governor Frederick G. Payne resigned on December 25, 1952 to prepare for his upcoming term in the United States Senate; Cross, as President of the Senate became Governor through constitutional succession. Cross' term as Senate President (and Governor) expired at 10:00am on January 7, 1953, allowing Senator Nathaniel M. Haskell as the newly elected president of the Senate to serve as governor for 25 hours. At 11:00am on January 8, 1953, Cross' official elected term of office began.

During Cross's term, the state highway commission was reorganized under a full time commissioner, and the state finance office was modernized and brought under closer control of the governor. The state liquor commission was also restructured, following a controversy in which commissioners and employees were accused of accepting bribes from distributors in exchange for carrying certain brands at state-owned liquor stores. Cross also caused dissension in Republican ranks with some of his appointments, including naming an attorney who was a political supporter to the superior court and then to the state supreme court, passing over judges then currently serving on lower courts, and appointing another supporter with minimal law enforcement experience to fill a vacant sheriff's position ahead of the candidate preferred by the party and the voters of the county.

Although personally exonerated in the liquor scandal, a politically wounded Cross was defeated in his reelection bid in 1954 by Democratic challenger, Edmund S. Muskie, by 22,375 votes. He was the first Republican to lose a Maine gubernatorial election since 1934, when Republican Alfred K. Ames was defeated by Democratic incumbent Louis Brann. Cross never sought public office again but returned to private life as an insurance and stock broker until his retirement in 1971.

== Death and burial ==
Cross died in Augusta on October 22, 1998; he was buried at Forest Grove Cemetery in Augusta.

== Family ==
Cross was married to Olena R. Moulton; they were the parents of three children.

== Legacy ==
In 2001, after major renovations, the Maine State Office Building was dedicated to Cross. A plaque in his honor is located in the second floor lobby.

== Sources ==
=== Internet ===
- "Biography: Cross, Burton M." Maine: An Encyclopedia. Harpswell, ME: Publius Research.
- "Biography, Governor Burton Melvin Cross". nga.org. Washington, DC: National Governors Association.

=== Newspapers ===
- "Democratic Victory First In Two Decades: Local Dissension Hurts GOP; Republican Leads Slashed". Reno Gazette-Journal. Reno, NV. Associated Press. September 14, 1954 – via Newspapers.com.

Party political offices
Preceded by Frederick G. Payne	Republican nominee for Governor of Maine; 1952, 1954	Succeeded by Willis A. Trafton Jr.
Political offices
Preceded by Frederick G. Payne	Governor of Maine; 1952–1953	Succeeded by Nathaniel M. Haskell
Preceded by Nathaniel M. Haskell	Governor of Maine; 1953–1955	Succeeded by Edmund Muskie
