= Clean Waters Restoration Act =

On November 3, 1966, President Lyndon Johnson signed the Clean Waters Restoration Act. The previous year's Water Quality Act required the states to establish and enforce water quality standards for all interstate waters that flowed through their boundaries. To make that possible, the Clean Waters Restoration Act provided federal funds for the construction of sewage treatment plants. This act and others that followed over the next decade had a significant impact in reducing pollution and restoring rivers.

== History ==
In 1948, the Federal Water Pollution Control Act, also known as the Clean Water Act of 1948, was signed into law. The legislation signed in 1948 was focused on how the government could enforce regulation to decrease the amount of pollution reaching Earth's water. This act was the first major statement from the federal government to show interest in water quality and contamination and pollution prevention. Prior to this act, the water quality responsibility fell on state and local governments, which did not have the funding to enforce any authority over water pollution.

The Clean Water Restoration Act in 1966 took federal water pollution regulation a step further in the fight for restoration. Instead of just restricting pollution, the goal was also to attempt to reverse some of the damage to the water.

The bill that Lyndon Johnson signed on November 3, 1966, was one shaped largely by Senator Edmund Muskie’s Subcommittee on Air and Water Pollution. Rivers across the country were restored because of senators who saw a problem and were determined to fix it.

On April 24, 2005, Clean Water Authority Restoration Act (2005) was introduced by Sen. Feingold, Russell D. [D-WI]. This bill aimed to amend the Federal Water Pollution Control Act to replace the term "navigable waters," throughout the Act, with the term "waters of the United States," defined to mean all waters subject to the ebb and flow of the tide, the territorial seas, and all interstate and intrastate waters and their tributaries, including lakes, rivers, streams (including intermittent streams), mudflats, sandflats, wetlands, sloughs, prairie potholes, wet meadows, playa lakes, natural ponds, and all impoundments of the foregoing, to the fullest extent that these waters, or activities affecting them, are subject to the legislative power of Congress under the Constitution.
