= James C. Oliver =

American politician (1895–1986)

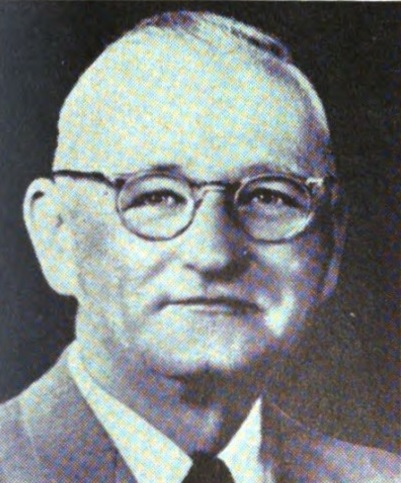

Member of the U.S. House of Representatives from Maine's 1st district
- In office January 3, 1959 – January 3, 1961
- Preceded by: Robert Hale
- Succeeded by: Peter A. Garland
- In office January 3, 1937 – January 3, 1943
- Preceded by: Simon M. Hamlin
- Succeeded by: Robert Hale

Personal details
- Born: James Churchill Oliver; August 6, 1895 South Portland, Maine, U.S.
- Died: December 25, 1986 (aged 91) Orlando, Florida, U.S.
- Party: Republican (until 1949); Democratic (1949‍–‍1986)
- Education: Bowdoin College (AB)

Military service
- Branch/service: United States Army; United States Coast Guard
- Years of service: 1917‍–‍1919 (USA); 1943‍–‍1946 (USCG)
- Rank: Major; Lieutenant commander
- Battles/wars: World War I; World War II

James Churchill Oliver (August 6, 1895 – December 25, 1986) was a U.S. representative from Maine. He served three consecutive congressional terms as a Republican from 1937 to 1943, then later served a fourth term as a Democrat from 1959 to 1961.

== Early life and career ==
Born in South Portland, Maine, Oliver attended the public schools and Bowdoin College in Brunswick, Maine, receiving an A.B. degree in 1917.

He enlisted in the United States Army on June 4, 1917, attended the Plattsburg Barracks Training Camp, and was commissioned a captain on November 27, 1917. He was promoted to major of Infantry on October 9, 1918, and transferred to the Inspector General's Department until honorably discharged on July 22, 1919.

He engaged in the general insurance business in Portland, Maine from 1930 to 1937. He served as member of the board of aldermen of South Portland, Maine, in 1932 and 1933.

== Political career ==
=== Congress ===
Oliver was elected as a Republican to the Seventy-fifth, Seventy-sixth, and Seventy-seventh Congresses (January 3, 1937 – January 3, 1943). He was an unsuccessful candidate for renomination in 1942.

=== Coast Guard and Campaign for Governor ===
He served as lieutenant commander in the United States Coast Guard from January 26, 1943, to April 23, 1946. In 1946 he engaged in the real estate and insurance business in Maine and California.

He was the unsuccessful Democratic nominee for governor in 1952.

=== Return to Congress ===
He was an unsuccessful Democratic candidate for Congress in 1954 and 1956. He unsuccessfully contested the election of Robert Hale to the Eighty-fifth Congress in 1956.

Oliver was elected as a Democrat to the Eighty-sixth Congress (January 3, 1959 – January 3, 1961). He was an unsuccessful candidate for reelection in 1960 to the Eighty-seventh Congress.

He served as delegate to the 1960 Democratic National Convention.

== Later career and death ==
He was a real estate developer in Cape Elizabeth, Maine. He moved to Orlando, Florida, where he died on December 25, 1986.

Party political offices
Preceded by Earle S. Grant	Democratic nominee for Governor of Maine; 1952	Succeeded by Edmund Muskie
U.S. House of Representatives
Preceded by Simon M. Hamlin	Member of the U.S. House of Representatives from Maine's 1st congressional district 1937-1943	Succeeded by Robert Hale
Preceded by Robert Hale	Member of the U.S. House of Representatives from Maine's 1st congressional district 1959-1961	Succeeded by Peter Garland
