= 1954 Maine gubernatorial election =

- September 13, 1954
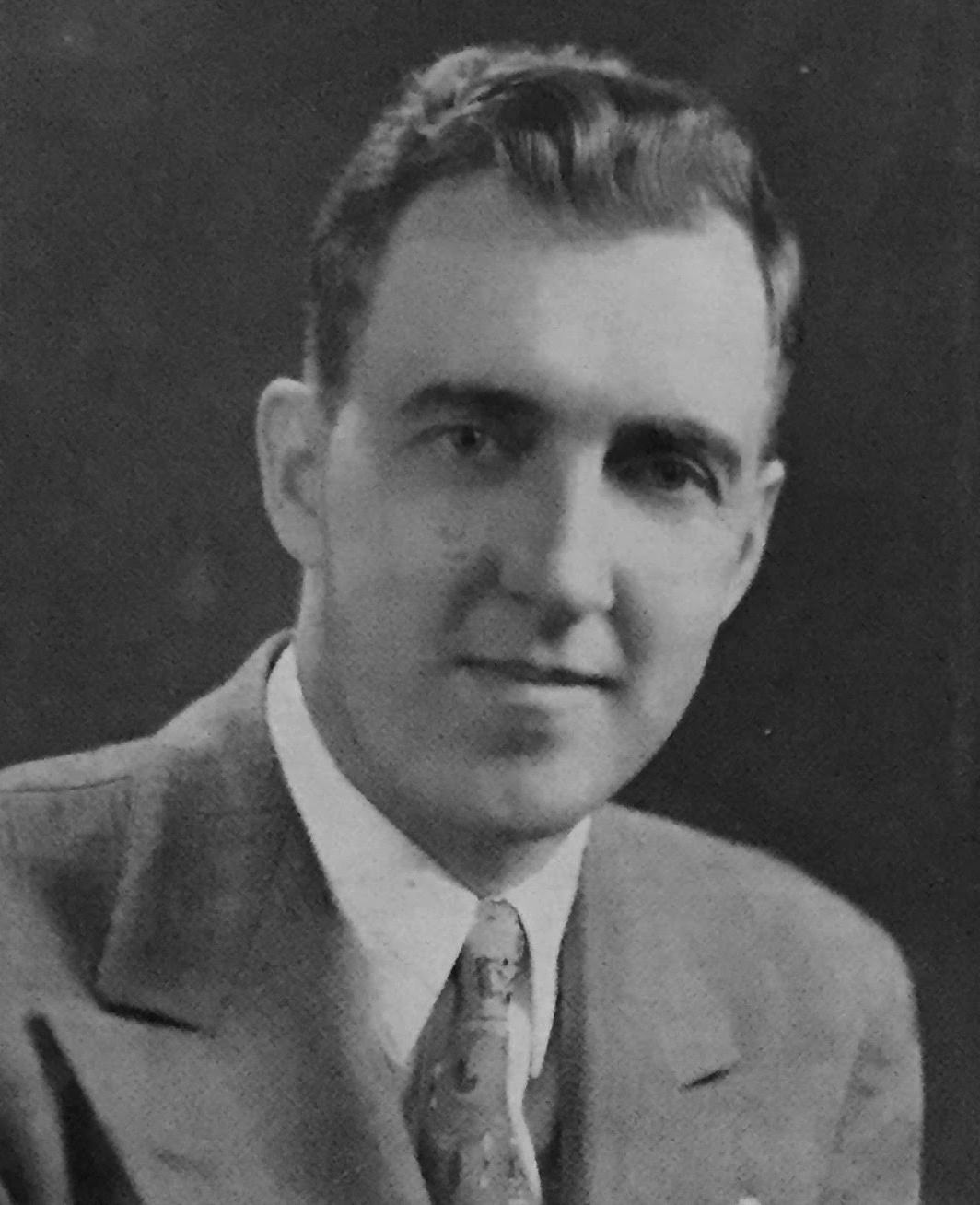

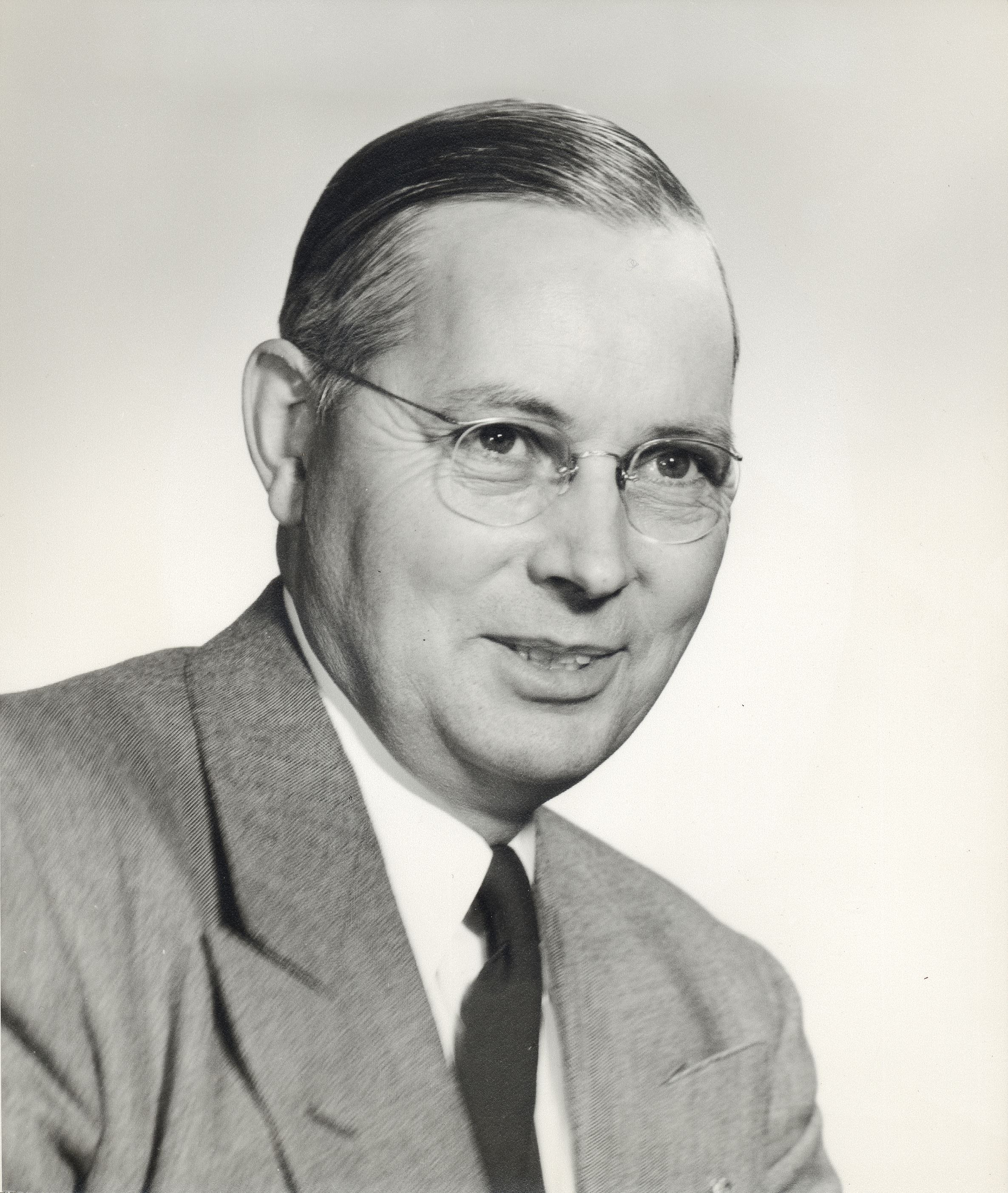
Nominee	Edmund Muskie	Burton M. Cross
Party	Democratic	Republican
Popular vote	135,673	113,298
Percentage	54.49%	45.51%
- County results Muskie: 50–60% 60–70% Cross: 50–60% 60–70%
Governor before election
Burton M. Cross
Republican
Elected Governor
Edmund Muskie
Democratic

The 1954 Maine gubernatorial election took place on September 13, 1954. Incumbent Republican Governor Burton M. Cross was seeking a second term which would have made him the fifth consecutive Governor (all Republicans) to be elected twice. Democratic state representative Edmund Muskie was widely viewed as the underdog due to Maine's solidly Republican history — Muskie acknowledged this himself by saying, "[this is] more as a duty than an opportunity because there was no chance of a Democrat winning." However, Muskie was able to pull an upset victory and become the first Democrat to be elected to the Blaine House since Louis J. Brann in 1934, and only the fourth Democrat in the 20th century. He also became Maine's first Roman Catholic governor. Both Cross and Muskie were unopposed in their respective primaries.

Muskie ran on a party platform of environmentalism and public investment. His environmental platform argued for the establishment of the Maine Department of Conservation to "have jurisdiction of forestry, inland fish and game, sea and shore fisheries, mineral, water, and other natural resources" and the creation of anti-pollution legislation. He stressed the need for "a two-party" approach to Maine politics which resonated with both Democratic and Republican voters wishing to see change. Muskie's central campaign slogan was "Maine Needs A Change" referencing the multi-year Republican dominance of state politics. He criticized the Republican Party for neglecting the environment, failing to restart the economy, underutilizing skilled labor forces, and ignoring public investment.

Muskie's surprise win has been viewed as a causal link to the end of Republican political dominance in Maine and the rise of the Maine Democratic Party. After his win, he was asked by other Democrats running in elections outside of Maine to make a series of campaign stops.

== Results ==
1954 Gubernatorial Election, Maine
Party	Candidate	Votes	%	±%
Democratic	Edmund Muskie	135,673	54.49%	−
Republican	Burton M. Cross (Incumbent)	113,298	45.51%	−
Majority		22,375	8.99%	

=== Counties that flipped from Republican to Democratic ===
- Aroostook (largest city: Presque Isle)
- Kennebec (largest city: Augusta)
- Oxford (largest town: Rumford)
- Penobscot (largest city: Bangor)
- Piscataquis (largest municipality: Dover-Foxcroft)
- Sagadahoc (largest town: Bath)
- Somerset (largest town: Skowhegan)
- Washington (largest city: Calais)
- Waldo (largest city: Belfast)
- York (largest town: Biddeford)
