= Nathaniel M. Haskell =

American politician

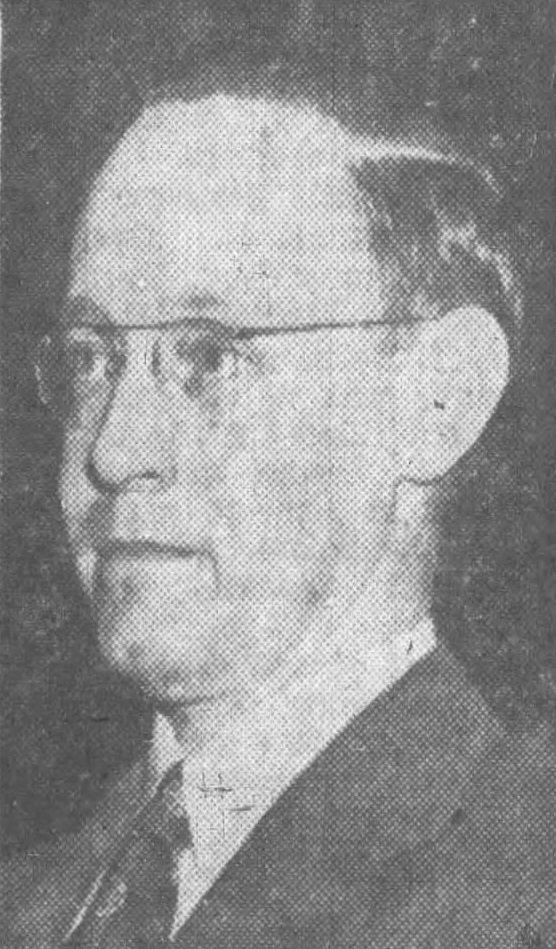
- Portland Press Herald, September 14, 1954

62nd Governor of Maine
- In office January 6, 1953 – January 7, 1953
- Preceded by: Burton M. Cross
- Succeeded by: Burton M. Cross

Member of the Maine Senate
- In office 1951–1953

Member of the Maine House of Representatives
- In office 1943–1949

Personal details
- Born: September 27, 1912 Pittsfield, Maine, U.S.
- Died: February 8, 1983 (aged 70) Portland, Maine, U.S.
- Party: Republican
- Profession: Lawyer

Nathaniel Mervin Haskell (September 27, 1912 – February 8, 1983) was an American attorney and Republican politician from Maine. Haskell served as the 62nd governor of Maine for 25 hours, starting on January 6, 1953.

== Biography ==
Haskell was born on September 27, 1912, in Pittsfield, Maine.

His parents died when he was two years old and his sister, Amelia, and her husband, Van Stevens, moved the family to Portland. Haskell graduated from Deering High School. Determined to be a lawyer, he graduated from the Peabody Law School in 1934 and was admitted to the Maine bar. For the remainder of his life he maintained his legal office in downtown Portland.

In 1943, Haskell was elected to the Maine House of Representatives and was reelected in 1945, 1947, and 1949 when he served as Speaker of the House. Elected to the Maine Senate in 1951, he was reelected in 1953 and in that same year elected President of the Senate.

Haskell's brief term as Governor was the result of constitutional succession in the wake of the 1952 elections. The outgoing Governor, Frederick G. Payne, resigned early to begin preparing to take his new seat in the United States Senate. With Maine having no lieutenant governor, the President of the Senate is next in the line of succession. At the time of Payne's resignation, Burton M. Cross became Governor by virtue of holding that office. However, Cross had also been elected Governor; his elected term was scheduled to begin on January 7, 1953. At 10:00am on January 6, 1953, Cross's term as Senate President (and therefore Governor) expired. Haskell, as the newly elected president, became Governor until the inaugural ceremony was held at 11:00am the next day.

He was not closely related to Robert Haskell, another Senate President who briefly became governor in between the terms of a prior one and a newly elected one.

Haskell continued as President for the 1953 regular session only, resigning prior to the start of the special session held later that year to accept the appointment as Probate Judge of Cumberland County.

He died on February 8, 1983, in Portland, Maine.

== Notes ==
Political offices
Preceded by Burton M. Cross	Governor of Maine; 1953	Succeeded by Burton M. Cross
