= 1966 Maine gubernatorial election =

- November 8, 1966
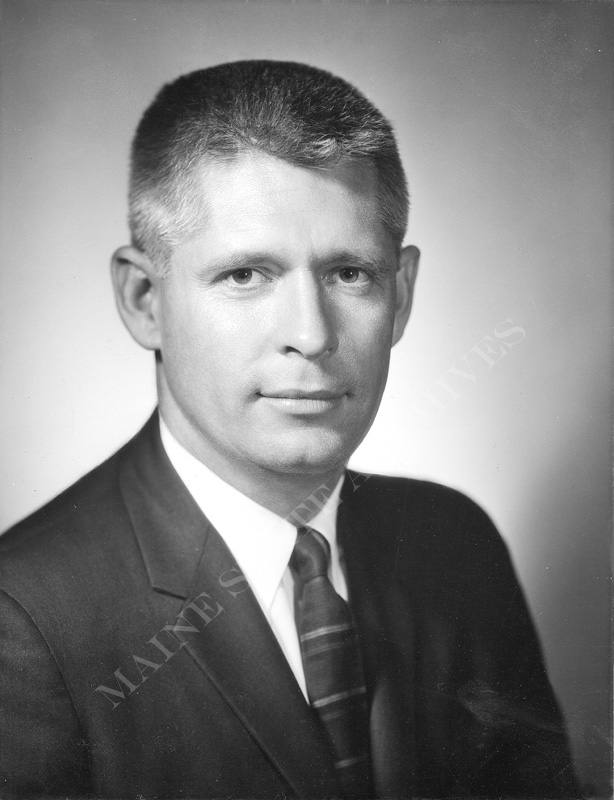

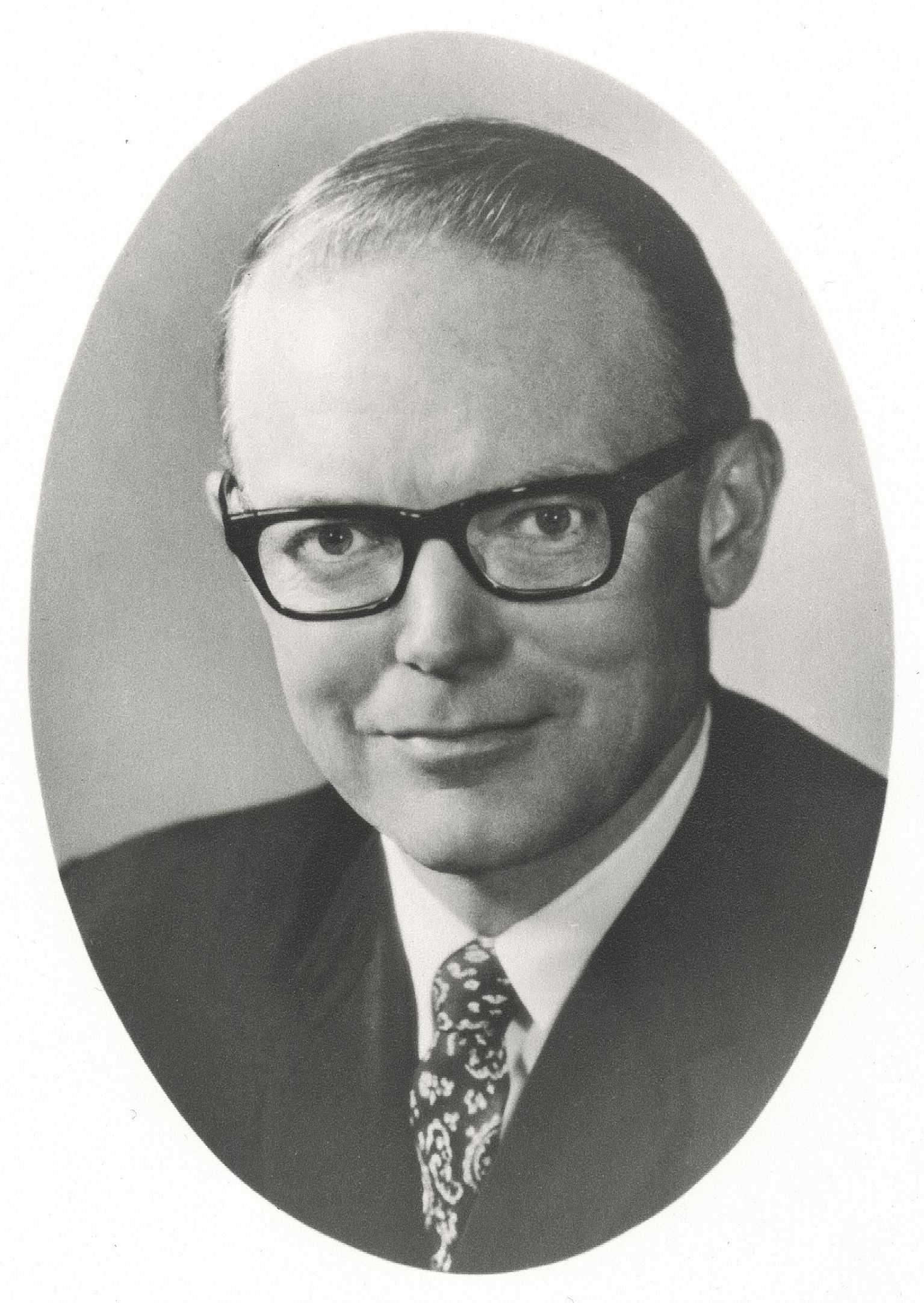
Nominee	Kenneth Curtis	John Reed
Party	Democratic	Republican
Popular vote	172,036	151,802
Percentage	53.12%	46.88%
- Curtis: 50–60% 60–70% 70–80% 80–90% >90% Reed: 50–60% 60–70% 70–80% 80–90% >90% Tie: 50%
Governor before election
John H. Reed
Republican
Elected Governor
Kenneth M. Curtis
Democratic

The 1966 Maine gubernatorial election took place on November 8, 1966. Incumbent Republican Governor John Reed was defeated by the Democratic Secretary of State Kenneth M. Curtis.

Reed had assumed the office of governor of Maine in 1959, following the death of incumbent Democrat Clinton Clauson. Reed was elected to finish Clauson's term in a 1960 special election, and was then re-elected in 1962 and became the first person to serve a full four-year term as governor of Maine. Reed was seeking a second full four-year term, and defeated state representative James Erwin for the Republican nomination. Erwin would go on to be the Republican nominee for governor in both 1970 and 1974, but would lose both times.

Curtis overcame two strong challengers in the Democratic primary, dispatching State House Speaker Dana Childs and Senate President Carlton Day Reed Jr.

Curtis's defeat of Reed marked the beginning a twenty-year period of Republican isolation from the Blaine House — Republicans would not recapture it until the 1986 election of John R. McKernan Jr.

Curtis, who was 35 at the time of his election, became the youngest sitting governor in the country.

This was the most recent gubernatorial election in Maine in which a non-incumbent candidate won with a majority of the vote, until Democrat Janet Mills won with 50.89% of the vote in 2018. As of 2022, Reed is the most recent incumbent governor to lose re-election; all succeeding governors have been re-elected, with the exception of James B. Longley, who did not run for re-election in 1978, holding himself to a one-term promise.

== Republican primary ==
=== Candidates ===
- James Erwin, state representative, of York
- John H. Reed, incumbent governor, of Fort Fairfield

Republican primary results
Party	Candidate	Votes	%
Republican	John H. Reed (incumbent)	55,924	59.69
Republican	James Erwin	37,765	40.31
Total votes		93,689	100.00

== Democratic primary ==
=== Candidates ===
- Dana Childs, state house speaker, of Portland
- Kenneth M. Curtis, incumbent secretary of state (1965–1966), of Manchester
- Carlton Day Reed Jr., Senate president, of Woolwich

=== Results ===
Democratic primary results
Party	Candidate	Votes	%
Democratic	Kenneth M. Curtis	30,879	55.63
Democratic	Carlton Day Reed Jr.	13,839	24.93
Democratic	Dana Childs	10,793	19.44
Total votes		55,511	100.00

== Results ==
Maine gubernatorial election results
Party	Candidate	Votes	%	±%
Democratic	Kenneth M. Curtis	172,036	53.12%	−
Republican	John H. Reed (incumbent)	151,802	46.88%	−
Majority		20,234	6.24%	
Democratic gain from Republican		Swing		

=== Counties that flipped from Republican to Democratic ===
- Cumberland (largest city: Portland)
- Penobscot (largest city: Bangor)
- Piscataquis (largest municipality: Dover-Foxcroft)
- Sagadahoc (largest town: Bath)
- Somerset (largest town: Skowhegan)
- Washington (largest city: Calais)
