= Cony Middle and High School =

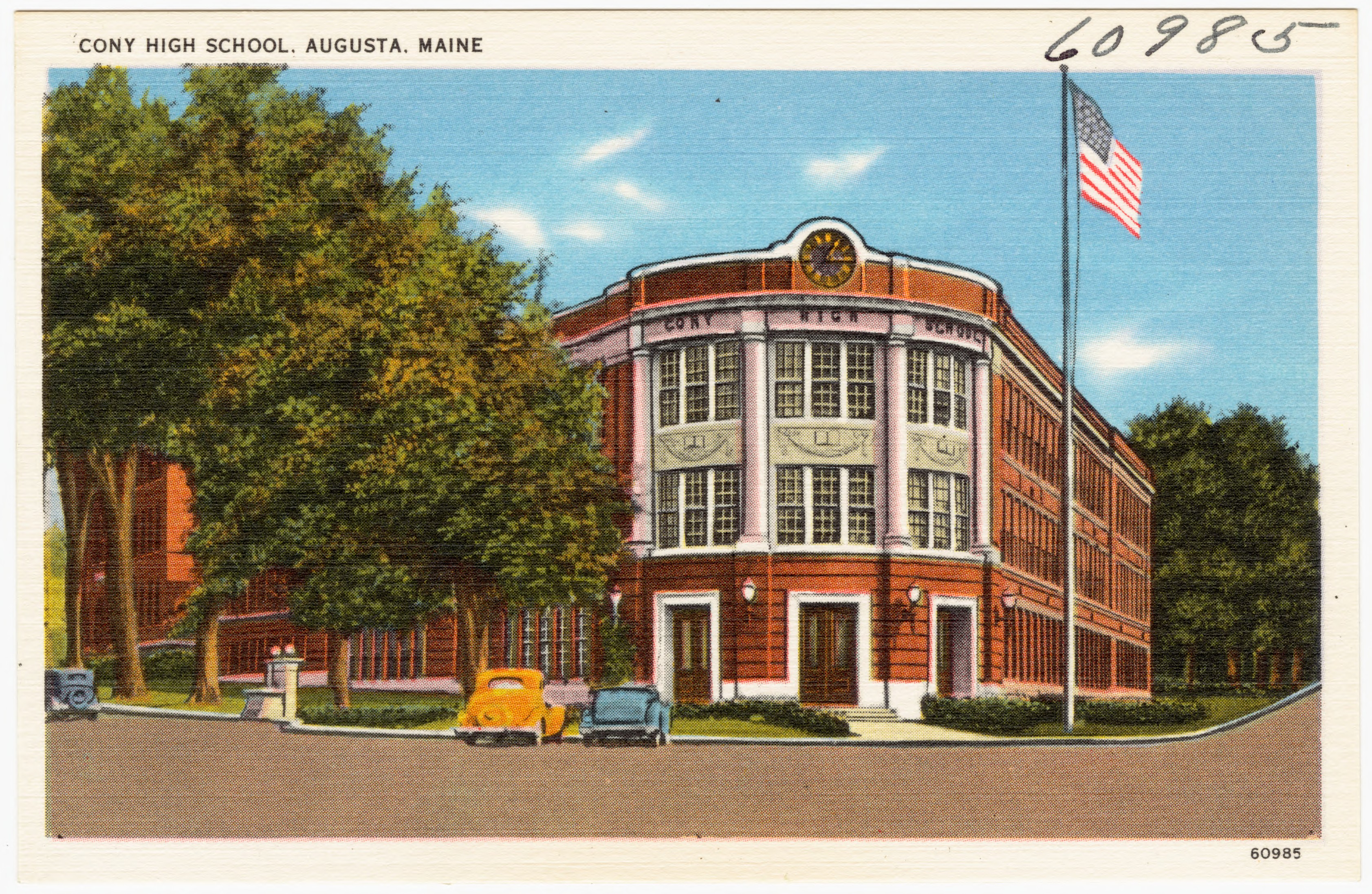
- Cony High School (circa 1930-1945)

Location
- 60 Pierce Drive; Augusta, Kennebec, Maine 04330; United States; 44°18′49″N 69°44′58″W

Information
- School type: Public
- Motto: Cultura-Honestum-Salubritas ("Knowledge-Integrity-Healthfulness")
- Established: 1815
- Founder: Daniel Cony
- School district: Augusta School Department
- Superintendent: Michael Tracey
- School code: 200040
- Principal: Kim Liscomb
- Teaching staff: 43.20 (on an FTE basis)
- Grades: 7–12
- Enrollment: 677 (2023–2024)
- Student to teacher ratio: 15.67
- Hours in school day: 6 hrs, 35 min.
- Colors: Red & White
- Song: Cony Song
- Athletics conference: Kennebec Valley Athletic Conference
- Mascot: Rameses
- Team name: Rams
- Rival: Gardiner High School
- Yearbook: Coniad
- Website: https://www.augustaschools.org/o/cony

Cony Middle and High School is a public school for Grades 9 to 12 in Augusta, Maine, United States, operated by the Augusta School Department. Cony draws its students from Augusta, as well as the surrounding communities of Chelsea, China, Jefferson, Palermo, Somerville, Vassalboro, Whitefield, and Windsor.

The school's origins are in the Cony Female Academy, which was founded in 1815 by Daniel Cony, and originally opened in 1816, to provide free education to orphans and other girls under the age of 16. The school later expanded into a co-ed high school. In the fall of 2006, the city of Augusta opened a new Cony High School adjacent to the Capital Area Technical Center on Pierce Drive. Three years later, it was consolidated with the remaining local middle school, and currently serves grades 7-12.

The new building is architecturally linked to the design of the Old Cony High School building which featured a wedge-shaped flatiron design. The flatiron building has been preserved as a building of historical significance and is in the National Register of Historic Places in Maine.

As of 2018–19 enrollment for Cony High was approximately 680 students.

== History ==
Old Cony High School, built between 1928 and 1932 and added to the National Register of Historic Places in 1988, was the former location of Cony High School. A three-story wedge-shaped (or flatiron-shaped) building with Colonial Revival detailing, it has since been converted to the Cony Flatiron Senior Residence.

The current facility opened in 2006. It had a cost of about $30,000,000.

In 2009 the board of trustees of the school district closed Hodgkins Middle School and expanded Cony into being both a middle and high school.

== Academics and rankings ==
In the 2020 U.S. News & World Report (based on data from the 2017–2018 academic year), Cony High School was ranked between 47 and 83 among high schools in the state and between 13,345 and 17,792 nationally. The school's mathematics proficiency rating was 26%, reading proficiency was 42%, and its graduation rate was 79%, well below the state average of 87%.

== Athletics ==
Cony competes in the Kennebec Valley Athletic Conference as a Class A school in all sports but football, where it competes in Class B. The Rams field teams in football, soccer, field hockey, cross country, golf, volleyball, basketball, cheerleading, ice hockey, indoor track, swimming, wrestling, baseball, softball, tennis, lacrosse, and outdoor track.

Cony and rival Gardiner Area High School hold the longest-running football rivalry in the state, and one of the longest-running high school football rivalries in the country. Since 1892, the two teams have met 148 times, playing every year other than 1917 (smallpox epidemic) and 2020 (COVID-19 pandemic), with Cony holding a 80-58-10 advantage.

Cony is well known for having one of the rowdiest student cheering sections in the state, referred to as the "Cony Crazies."

- Baseball - Class A State Champions (1990, 1991).
- Girls' Basketball - Class A State Champions (1987, 1989, 1995, 1996, 1998, 2005, 2007).
- Boys' Basketball - Class A State Champions (1966, 1973, 1978).
- Football - Class B State Champions (1932, 2013, 2026)
- Field Hockey - Class A State Champions (1982, 1988, 1989, 1993, 1995).
- Softball - Class A State Champions (1983, 2012).
- Girls' Tennis - Class A State Champions (1991).
- Boys' Tennis - Class A State Champions (1993, 1972).
- Girls' Track & Field - Class B State Champions (2021).

== Chizzle Wizzle ==
Cony High School's "Chizzle Wizzle" variety show is the longest running high school production in the United States. It originated in the 1890s as a football fundraiser and has evolved into a major part of the Augusta community. In 2026, the production hit the stage for its 135th consecutive year. The show consists of two halves, Olio and Minstrel. The production runs for 4 nights at the end of every March and culminates with the Chizzle Wizzle Ball on Saturday night. The name, "Chizzle Wizzle" comes from one of the school's many old cheers: "Chizzle Wizzle, Chizzle Wizzle, sis boom bah! Cony High, Cony High, rah, rah, rah!"

== Notable alumni ==
- Mildred Burrage, artist
- Julia Clukey, luger
- Kenneth M. Curtis, lawyer and former politician
- Richard Dysart, actor
- Hoddy Hildreth, politician and conservationist
- Roger Katz, politician and lawyer
- Rachel Nichols, actress and model
- Niles Perkins, athlete and physician
- Bob Pickett, football player and coach
- Jeffrey Pierce, politician and builder
- Matthew Pouliot, politician and realtor
- Stanley Sproul, politician and lawyer
- Dorothy Clarke Wilson, writer and dramatist

== See also ==
- Education in Maine
