= Governor Haskell =

Governor Haskell may refer to:

- Charles N. Haskell (1860–1933), 1st Governor of Oklahoma
- Nathaniel M. Haskell (1912–1983), 62nd Governor of Maine
- Robert Haskell (1903–1987), 65th Governor of Maine
