= Harrison Richardson =

American lawyer and politician (1930–2009)

Harrison L. Richardson (1930 – February 26, 2009) was an American lawyer and politician from Maine. A Republican, Richardson served three terms in the Maine House of Representatives (1965–71) and one term in the Maine Senate (1973–75). He represented Cumberland in the Legislature.

== Political career ==
Richardson was a proponent of Maine's first income tax, which was adopted in 1969 due to a crisis in funding mental health. He was also an early advocate of container deposit legislation, which was eventually adopted by the State in 1978. During his final two terms in the House, Richardson served as the Majority Leader. He unsuccessfully sought the Republican nomination for Governor of Maine in 1974, losing to James Erwin. He also served two terms on the University of Maine Board of Trustees. He was also a trustee at Maine Maritime Academy and the American University in Bulgaria.

== Professional career ==
A well-known trial lawyer, Richardson was named a Fellow to the American College of Trial Lawyers in 1975.

== Personal ==
Richardson played with the University of Maine football team, where was an All-New England tackle. He served in the United States Marine Corps, including 14 months in Korea. He died on February 26, 2009, at his home in Gorham.
