= James Thomas Wyman (politician) =

American politician

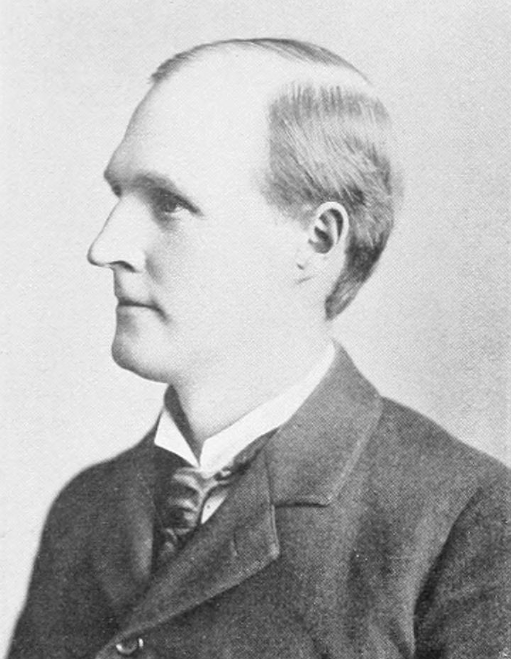
- Photograph c. 1897

Minnesota House of Representatives
- In office 1893–1894

Minnesota Senate
- In office 1895–1898

Personal details
- Born: October 15, 1849 Milbridge, Maine, U.S.
- Died: 1918 (aged 68–69)
- Party: Republican
- Spouse: Rosa Lamberson
- Children: 7

James Thomas Wyman (October 15, 1849 – 1918) was an American businessman and politician who served as a member of the Minnesota House of Representatives and Senate.

== Biography ==
James T. Wyman was born in Milbridge, Maine to merchant John Wyman. He moved to Northfield, Minnesota in 1868, where he attended Carleton College for a year and headed a local factory and sawmill.

Wyman moved to Minneapolis in 1871. He is politically a Republican and was elected to the lower house of the Minnesota Legislature in 1893, and to the Minnesota Senate in 1895.
