= Horace Hildreth =

American politician, 59th Governor of Maine (1902–1988)

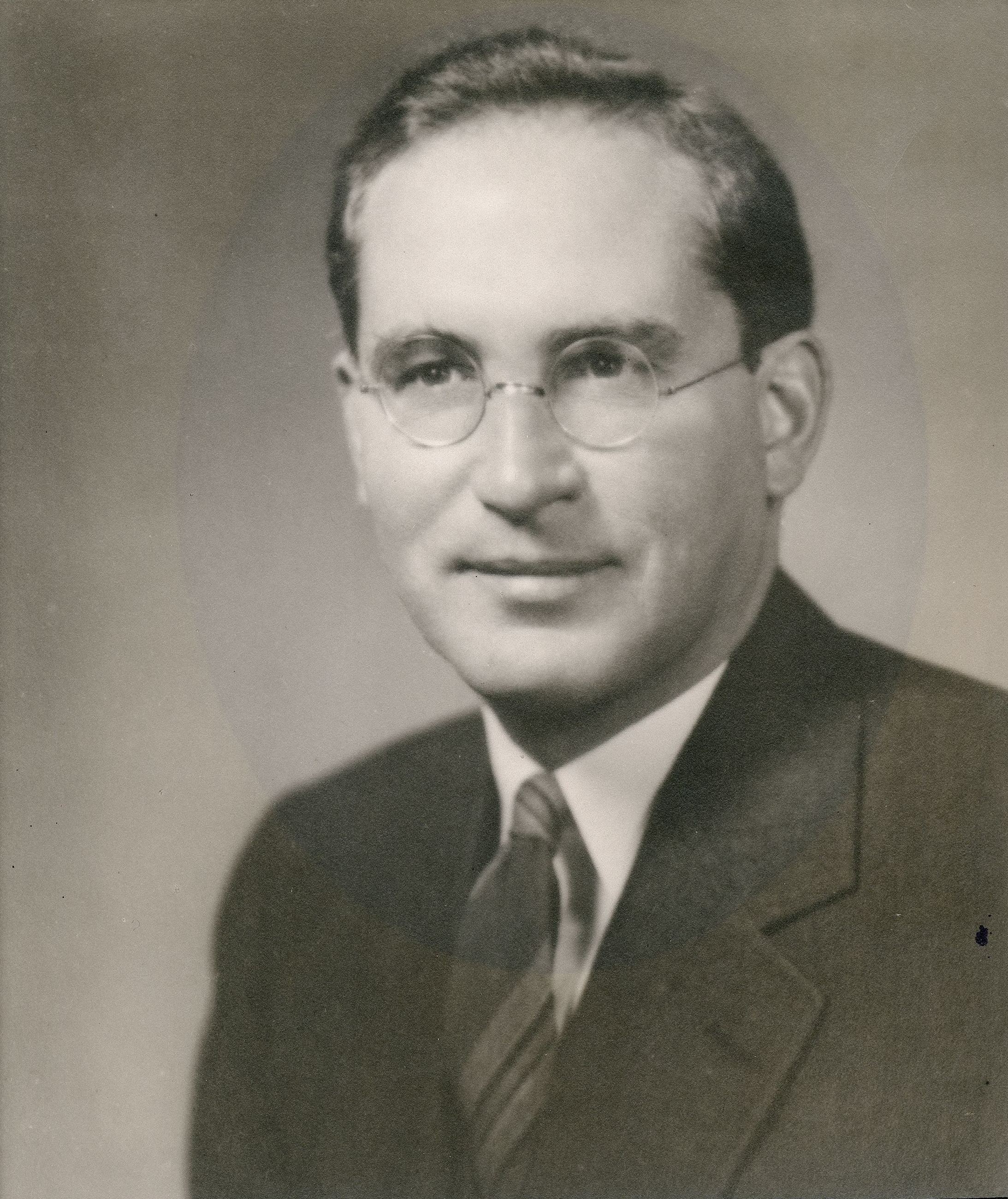

United States Ambassador to Pakistan
- In office May 19, 1953 – May 1, 1957
- President: Dwight D. Eisenhower
- Preceded by: John M. Cabot
- Succeeded by: James M. Langley

Chair of the National Governors Association
- In office July 13, 1947 – June 13, 1948
- Preceded by: Millard Caldwell
- Succeeded by: Lester C. Hunt

59th Governor of Maine
- In office January 3, 1945 – January 5, 1949
- Preceded by: Sumner Sewall
- Succeeded by: Frederick G. Payne

109th President of the Maine Senate
- In office 1943–1945
- Preceded by: Francis H. Friend
- Succeeded by: George D. Varney

Personal details
- Born: Horace Augustus Hildreth; December 2, 1902 Gardiner, Maine, U.S.
- Died: June 2, 1988 (aged 85) Portland, Maine, U.S.
- Party: Republican
- Spouse: Katherine
- Children: Hoddy
- Education: Bowdoin College (BA); Harvard University (LLB)

Horace Augustus Hildreth (December 2, 1902 – June 2, 1988) was an American diplomat, businessman and Republican politician. He served as the Governor of Maine for two two-year terms from 1945 until January 5, 1949, and served as United States Ambassador to Pakistan under president Dwight D. Eisenhower. He also founded the company that became Diversified Communications.

Hildreth was born in Gardiner, Maine, the son of an attorney. Hildreth attended local schools before graduating from Bowdoin College in the class of 1925 and receiving his LL.B. from Harvard University in 1928.

In Boston he joined the prestigious law firm of Ropes, Gray, Best, Coolidge and Rugg before returning to Maine with the desire for a political career. Elected to the Maine House of Representatives in 1940 and the Maine Senate in 1942, he served as 109th President of the Maine Senate for the 1943–1944 term.

He won the Republican gubernatorial primary in 1944 and was elected the 59th governor of Maine by a landslide margin. Reelected in 1946 by another large margin, he was a supporter of the University of Maine and education for veterans.

From 1947 to 1948 he chaired the National Governors Conference and proposed that the retail sales tax be the exclusive province of the federal government as a trade-off for the elimination of federal gas, inheritance and alcohol taxes.

In 1948 he lost the Republican nomination for U.S. Senator to Margaret Chase Smith, thus ending his political career. In 1949 he founded Community Broadcasting Service, a company which in 1953 would establish Maine's first television station, WABI-TV. Community Broadcasting Service later became known as Diversified Communications, a company which is still in existence today and still controlled by the Hildreth family.

From the time of his loss of the senatorial nomination until his appointment as Ambassador to Pakistan, Hildreth served as President of Bucknell University in Lewisburg, Pennsylvania.

From 1953 to 1957, Hildreth served the Dwight D. Eisenhower administration as United States Ambassador to Pakistan. His daughter Josephine Hildreth married the son of the Iskandar Mirza, President of Pakistan.

In 1958, he attempted a political comeback and he was the Republican candidate for Governor, but was defeated by Democrat Clinton Clauson.

In 1967, he bought a controlling share of a Portland radio station, but withdrew from active participation in its operation in 1974.

Hildreth was a resident of Cumberland Foreside when he died on June 2, 1988, of a heart attack at Maine Medical Center in Portland.

Hildreth's son, Hoddy Hildreth, later became a member of the Maine House of Representatives and a leading conservationist.

Political offices
Preceded by Francis H. Friend	President of the Maine Senate; 1943–1945	Succeeded by George D. Varney
Preceded by Sumner Sewall	Governor of Maine; 1945–1949	Succeeded by Frederick G. Payne
Preceded by Millard F. Caldwell	Chair of the National Governors Association; 1947–1948	Succeeded by Lester C. Hunt
Party political offices
Preceded by Sumner Sewall	Republican nominee for Governor of Maine; 1944, 1946	Succeeded by Frederick G. Payne
Preceded by Willis A. Trafton Jr.	Republican nominee for Governor of Maine; 1958	Succeeded by John H. Reed
Diplomatic posts
Preceded by John M. Cabot	United States Ambassador to Pakistan; 1953–1957	Succeeded by James M. Langley
