= Stanley Sproul =

American politician

Stanley E. Sproul (March 18, 1920 – May 13, 2015) was an American politician and lawyer from Maine. Sproul, a Republican, served as Mayor of Augusta, Maine from 1971 to 1974. He simultaneously represented Augusta in the Maine House of Representatives (1973–74). When not in public office, Sproul ran a law office. In 1974, Sproul sought the Republican nomination for Governor of Maine, but lost to Maine Attorney General James Erwin.

Sproul was born in 1920 in Windsor, Maine and moved to Augusta in 1932. He graduated from Cony High School in 1938 and became a pilot in the United States Navy. Sproul went to Northeastern University and then to Northeastern University School of Law. Sproul was admitted to the Maine bar.

== See also ==
- List of mayors of Augusta, Maine
