= Augusta School District =

Augusta School District may refer to:

- Augusta School District (Arkansas), located in Augusta, Arkansas
- Augusta School District (Maine), located in Augusta, Maine
- Augusta School District (Wisconsin), located in Augusta, Wisconsin

Also, refer to:

- Augusta Christian Schools, located in Martinez, Georgia
- Augusta County Public Schools, located in Augusta County, Virginia
