= Governor Clinton =

Governor Clinton may refer to:

- Clinton Clauson (1895–1959), 66th Governor of Maine
- Bill Clinton (born 1946), 40th and 42nd Governor of Arkansas
- DeWitt Clinton (1769–1828), 6th Governor of New York
- George Clinton (vice president) (1739–1812), 1st Governor of New York
- George Clinton (Royal Navy officer) (1680s–1761), Commodore Governor of Newfoundland in 1731 and Governor of the Province of New York from 1741 to 1753
