= 1958 Maine gubernatorial election =

- September 8, 1958
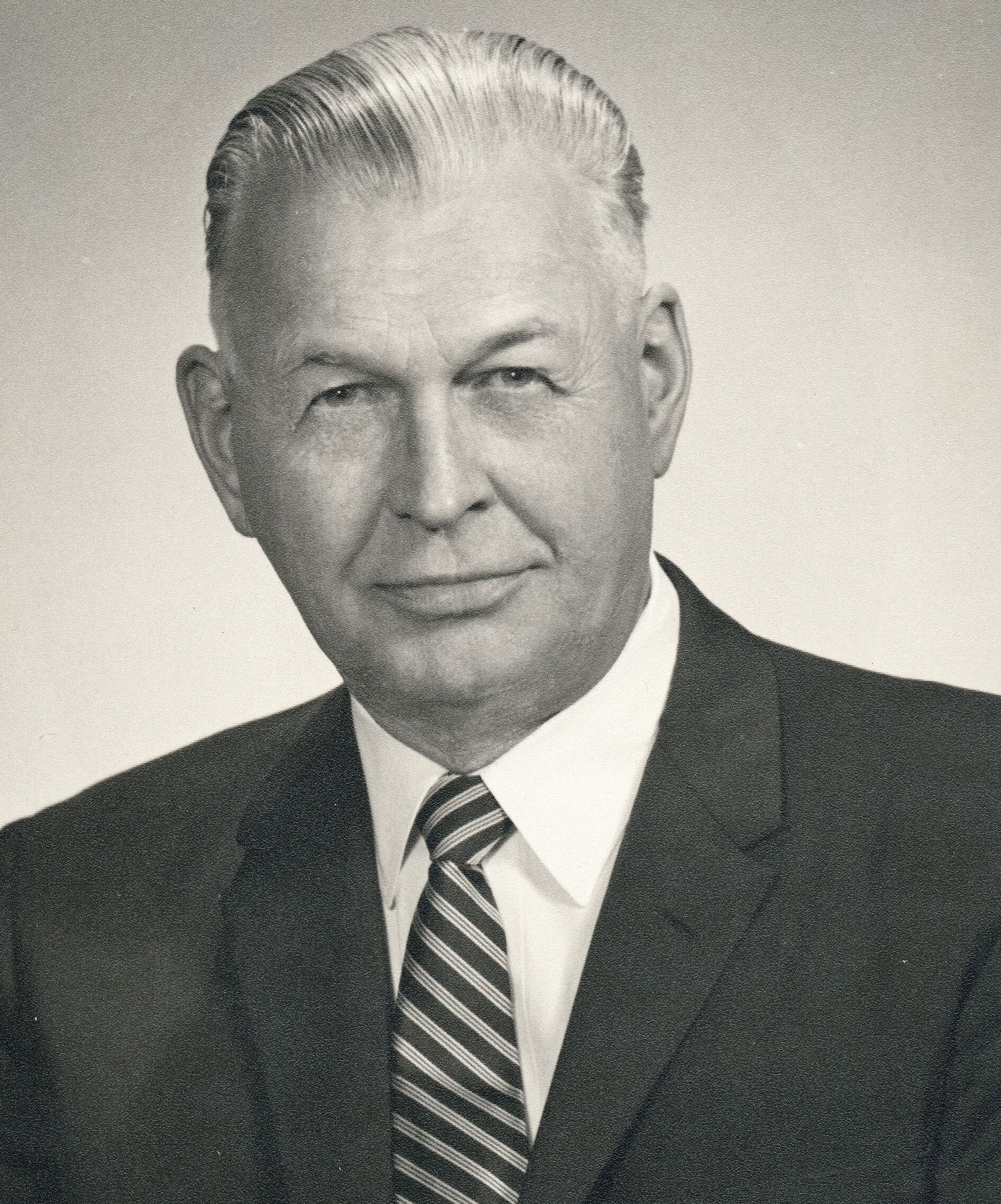

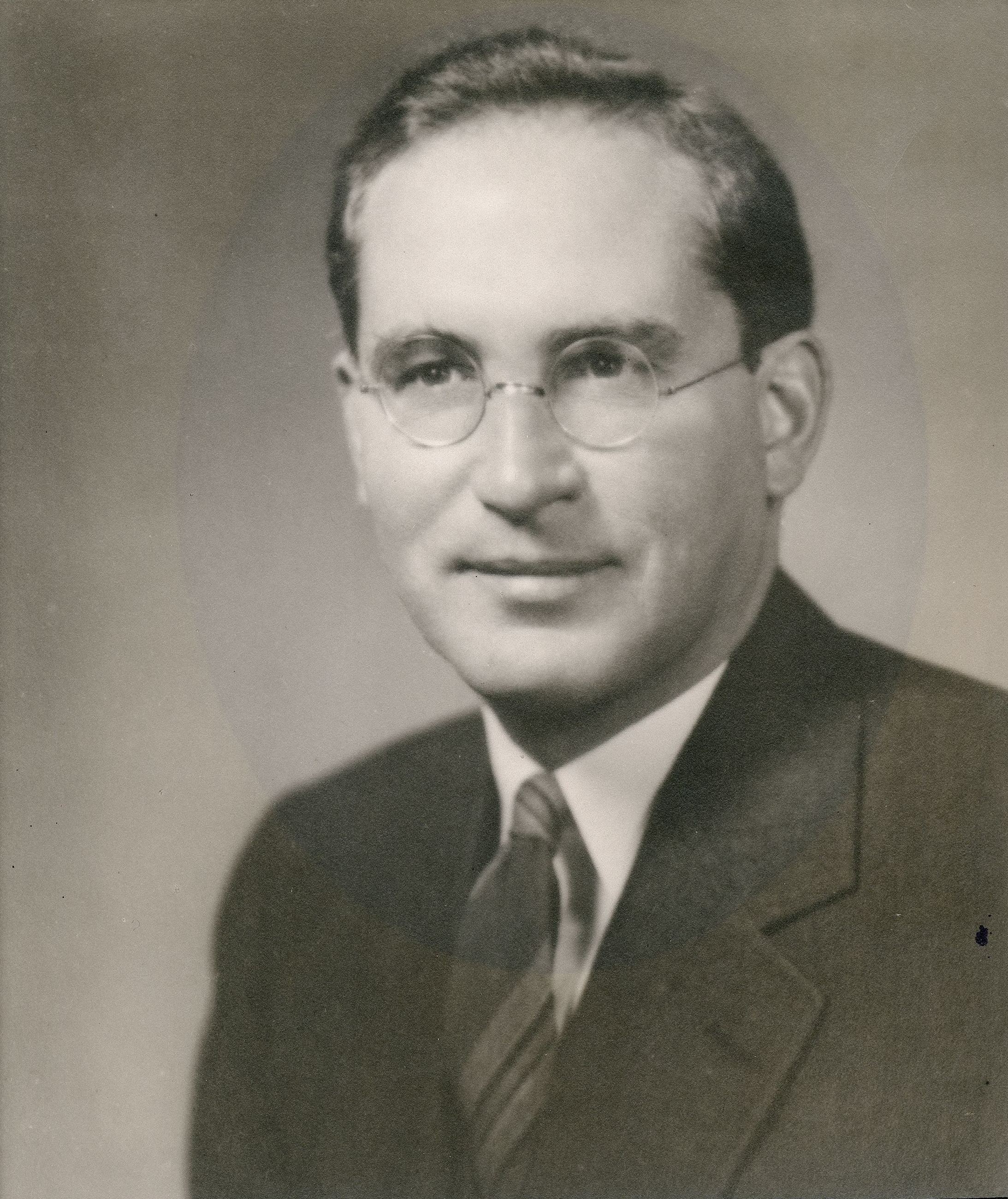
Nominee	Clinton Clauson	Horace Hildreth
Party	Democratic	Republican
Popular vote	145,673	134,572
Percentage	51.98%	48.02%
- County results Clauson: 50–60% 60–70% Hildreth: 50–60% 60–70%
Governor before election
Edmund Muskie
Democratic
Elected Governor
Clinton Clauson
Democratic

The 1958 Maine gubernatorial election took place on September 8, 1958. Incumbent Democratic Governor Edmund Muskie was term limited and seeking election to the United States Senate, and thus did not run. Democrat Clinton Clauson, then mayor of Waterville, unexpectedly defeated Muskie's chosen Democratic candidate in the primary, Maynard Dolloff, and faced off against Republican Horace Hildreth, who had previously served two terms as governor from 1945 to 1949, in the general election. Though Hildreth was the heavy favorite to win, Clauson was able to narrowly defeat him, retaining the Blaine House for the Democrats.

The election was also the last time that Maine would hold its election in September. Traditionally, Maine had held its elections two months before the rest of the nation, which had help give birth to the phrase "As Maine goes, so goes the nation" and its status as a bellwether state. However, following a 1957 referendum, the state constitution was amended to hold all elections after 1958 in November and shift from two-year to four-year terms. Thus, Clauson became the first Governor elected to a four-year term, with the next election being scheduled for November 1962. However, Clauson died in December of 1959, forcing a special election to be held in 1960 to elect a governor to serve the balance of Clauson's term.

== Democratic primary ==
=== Candidates ===
- Clinton Clauson, former mayor of Waterville
- Maynard C. Dolloff, State Grange Master, of Gray

=== Results ===
Democratic primary results
Party	Candidate	Votes	%
Democratic	Clinton Clauson	20,736	51.79
Democratic	Maynard C. Dolloff	19,301	48.21
Total votes		40,037	100.00

== Republican primary ==
=== Candidates ===
- Philip F. Chapman, former state senator, of Portland
- Horace A. Hildreth, former Governor of Maine (1945–1949), former United States Ambassador to Pakistan (1951–1957), of Cumberland

=== Results ===
Republican primary results
Party	Candidate	Votes	%
Republican	Horace A. Hildreth	63,424	62.00
Republican	Philip F. Chapman	38,865	38.00
Total votes		102,289	100.00

== Results ==
1958 Gubernatorial Election, Maine
Party	Candidate	Votes	%	±%
Democratic	Clinton Clauson	145,673	51.98%	−
Republican	Horace A. Hildreth	134,572	48.02%	−
Majority		11,101	3.96%	

=== Counties that flipped from Democratic to Republican ===
- Aroostook (largest city: Presque Isle)
- Franklin (largest town: Farmington)
- Knox (largest municipality: Rockland)
- Penobscot (largest city: Bangor)
- Piscataquis (largest municipality: Dover-Foxcroft)
- Washington (largest city: Calais)
- Waldo (largest city: Belfast)
