= 1946 Maine gubernatorial election =

- September 9, 1946
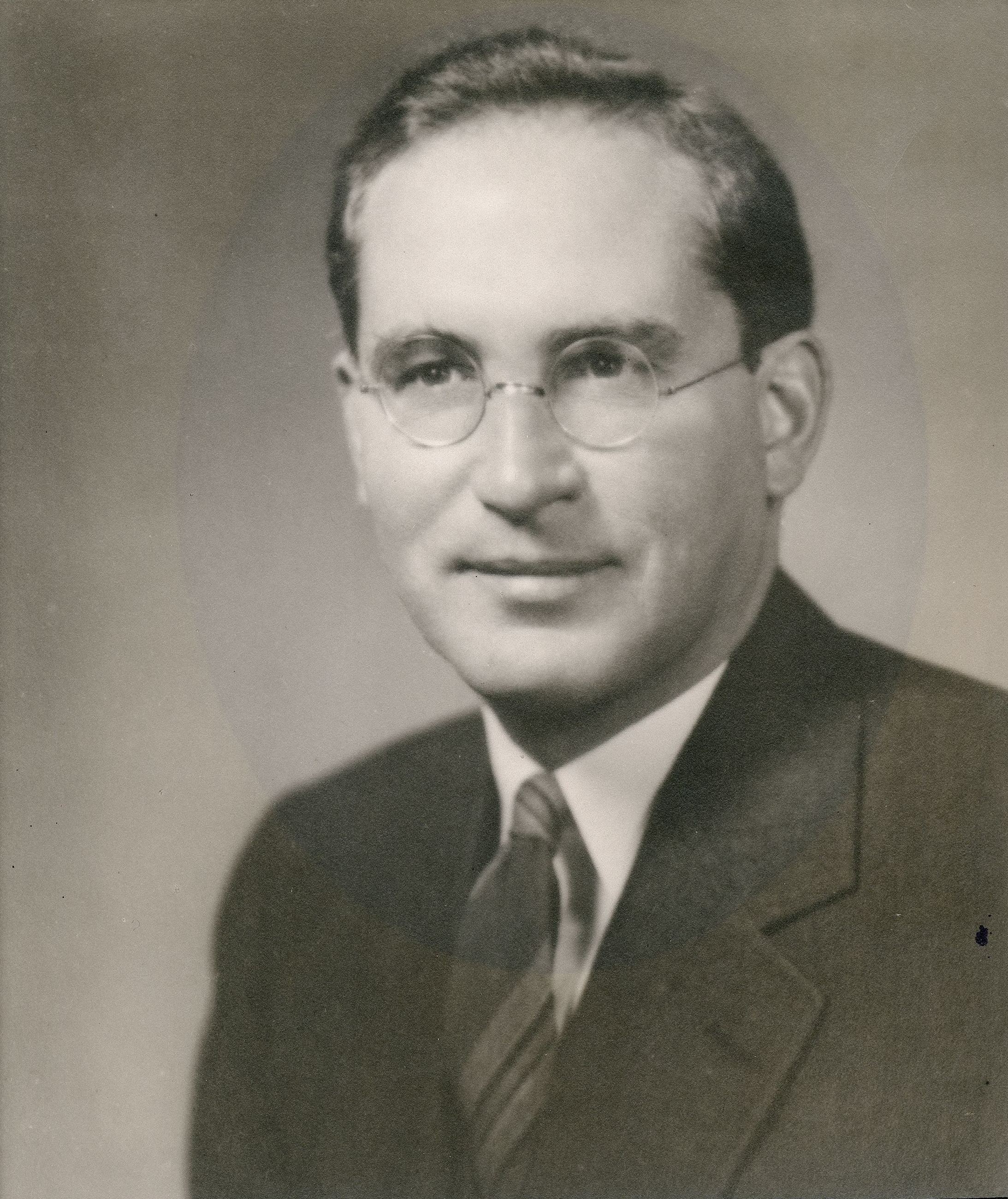

Nominee	Horace Hildreth	F. Davis Clark
Party	Republican	Democratic
Popular vote	110,327	69,624
Percentage	61.31%	38.69%
- County results Hildreth: 50–60% 60–70% 70–80% Clark: 50–60%
Governor before election
Horace Hildreth
Republican
Elected Governor
Horace Hildreth
Republican

The 1946 Maine gubernatorial election took place on September 9, 1946. Incumbent Republican Governor Horace Hildreth, was seeking a second term, and faced off against Democrat F. Davis Clark. This election represented the first gubernatorial election in Maine following the end of the Second World War, and saw Hildreth easily win re-election.

Since Hildreth failed to carry heavily Democratic Androscoggin County and Clark failed to flip any of the fifteen other counties in the state, this was the last Maine gubernatorial election that saw no counties flip from the previous election until the 2022 gubernatorial election, which saw no counties flip from the 2018 election.

== Results ==
1946 Gubernatorial Election, Maine
Party	Candidate	Votes	%	±%
Republican	Horace A. Hildreth (incumbent)	110,327	61.31%	−
Democratic	F. Davis Clark	69,624	38.69%	−
Majority		40,703	22.62%	
