= Sue Hubbell =

American writer (1935–2018)

Suzanne Hubbell (née Gilbert; January 28, 1935 – October 13, 2018) was an American author. Her books A Country Year and A Book of Bees were selected by The New York Times Book Review as Notable Books of the Year. She also wrote for The New Yorker, the St. Louis Post-Dispatch, Smithsonian and Time, and was a frequent contributor to the "Hers" column of The New York Times.

Sue Hubbell was born and raised in Kalamazoo, Michigan. She studied biology and was a librarian at Brown University until 1972, when she and her husband moved to the Missouri Ozarks. Hubbell also lived in Washington, D.C., and Milbridge, Maine. She was the sister of the author Bil Gilbert, who also writes about natural history. Hubbell died on October 13, 2018, at the age of 83 in Bar Harbor, Maine, from complications of dementia.

== Publications ==
Books by Sue Hubbell include:

- A Country Year: Living the Questions. New York: Random House (1986) ISBN 0-394-54603-2
- A Book of Bees: And How to Keep Them. Boston: Houghton Mifflin (1988) ISBN 0-395-88324-5
- On This Hilltop. New York: Ballantine Books (1991) ISBN 0-345-37306-5
- Broadsides from the Other Orders: A Book of Bugs. New York: Random House (1993) ISBN 0-679-40062-1
- Far-flung Hubbell. New York: Random House (1995) ISBN 0-679-42833-X
- Waiting for Aphrodite: Journeys into the Time Before Bones. Boston: Houghton Mifflin (1999) ISBN 0-395-83703-0
- Shrinking the Cat: Genetic Engineering Before We Knew About Genes. (2001)
- From Here to There and Back Again. Ann Arbor: University of Michigan Press (2004) ISBN 0-472-11419-0
