= K. M. de Silva =

Sri Lankan academic, historian and author (born 1931)

Professor K. M. de Silva
- Born: 31 December 1931 (age 94)
- Education: Kingswood College, Kandy; University of Ceylon, Peradeniya; University of London
- Occupation: Academic

Kingsley Muthumuni de Silva (born 31 December 1931) is a Sri Lankan academic, historian and author. A former lecturer of history at the University of Ceylon, Peradeniya, de Silva has written numerous books on Sri Lankan history including the highly acclaimed A History of Sri Lanka.

== Early life and family ==
De Silva was born on 31 December 1931. He was educated at Kingswood College, Kandy, and later at the University of Ceylon, Peradeniya from where he received a BA degree in history. He later received a Ph.D from the University of London for his research into the social policy of missionary organisations in the mid-19th century.

De Silva is married to Chandra and they have a son Rajiv (Ravi).

== Career ==
After graduation de Silva started teaching at the University of Ceylon, Peradeniya. He was made chair of Sri Lanka history at the university in 1969. He held this position until 1995.

De Silva was awarded a D.Litt degree by the University of London in 1991. He founded International Centre for Ethnic Studies in 1982 and served as its chairman and executive-director. He was awarded the 2002 Fukuoka Asian Culture Prize in the academic category. De Silva was awarded the Deshamanya title in the 2017 Sri Lankan national honours. He was appointed Chancellor of the University of Peradeniya, Sri Lanka in May 2017.

== Works ==
De Silva has written/edited numerous books during his long career.

- History of Ceylon: Volume I Part 1 (1959, Ceylon University Press)
- History of Ceylon: Volume I Part 2 From the Earliest Times to 1505 (1960, Ceylon University Press)
- Social Policy and Missionary Organizations in Ceylon 1840-1855 (1965, Longmans, Green & Co.)
- History of Ceylon: Volume III From the Beginning of the Nineteenth Century to 1948 (1973, University of Ceylon, editor)
- A History of Sri Lanka (1981, University of California Press)
- Managing Ethnic Tensions in Multi-Ethnic Societies: Sri Lanka, 1880-1985 (1986, University Press of America,)
- Religion, Nationalism, and the State in Modern Sri Lanka (1986, University of South Florida)
- Internationalization of Ethnic Conflict (1991, Pinter, co-author Ronald James May)
- Peace Accords and Ethnic Conflict (1993, Pinter, co-author S. W. R. De A. Samarasinghe)
- J. R. Jayewardene of Sri Lanka: a Political Biography (1994, University of Hawaii Press, co-author William Howard Wriggins)
- J. R. Jayewardene of Sri Lanka: 1906-1956 (1994, University of Hawaii Press, co-author William Howard Wriggins)
- Regional powers and small state security: India and Sri Lanka, 1977-1990 (1995, Woodrow Wilson Center Press)
- Reaping the Whirlwind: Ethnic Conflict, Ethnic Politics in Sri Lanka (1998, Penguin)
- Sri Lanka and the Defeat of the LTTE (2012, Penguin)
- Ethnic Conflict in Buddhist Societies in South and Southeast Asia: The Politics Behind Religious Rivalries (2015, International Centre for Ethnic Studies, Sri Lanka, editor)
- The Making of a Historian: A Memoir (2017)
- The Island Story: A Short History of Sri Lanka (2017)
