= William Howard Wriggins =

American diplomat and academic (1918–2008)

United States Ambassador to Sri Lanka
- In office August 18, 1977 – December 13, 1979
- President: Jimmy Carter
- Preceded by: John H. Reed
- Succeeded by: Donald R. Toussaint

Personal details
- Born: February 14, 1918
- Died: August 30, 2008 (aged 90) Hanover, New Hampshire, U.S.
- Spouse: Sally Hovey Wriggins
- Children: 3
- Education: Dartmouth College; University of Chicago; Yale University
- Occupation: Diplomat, author, academic

William Howard Wriggins (February 14, 1918 – August 30, 2008) was a US diplomat, author and academic who served as the United States ambassador to Sri Lanka and the Maldives from 1977 until 1979. His interest in the study of Sri Lanka spanned over fifty years of professional and academic work.

== Early life ==
He was born in Philadelphia and attended Germantown Friends School, a Quaker private school. His academic education included degrees from Dartmouth College (including a junior year at Sciences Po in Paris), the University of Chicago and Yale University.

In the spring of 1941 he joined a Quaker program run by the American Friends Service Committee (AFSC) for training overseas relief workers and in 1942 he became an assistant in their Lisbon refugee office.This was the beginning of his work for AFSC in North Africa, Egypt, Italy and France until December 1946, when he returned to the US and worked for AFSC at the United Nations in New York for half a year. He worked overseas for AFSC for more than five years. As a committed Quaker this was also a way to avoid military Service during World War II. In 1947 he began graduate school, first at the University of Chicago and then at Yale University, where he got a PhD in International Politics in 1952. During that time he interrupted his academic education again and worked in the Gaza Strip for the AFSC in its relief efforts there.

== Career ==
His professional career began with a teaching position at Vassar College. Much of Wriggins' academic studies and professional career centered on the study of South Asia, specifically Sri Lanka. beginning with a two-year grant from the Rockefeller Foundation for field research there. He wrote numerous books and other works on Sri Lanka, the first one being Ceylon: Dilemmas of a New Nation, in 1960. He later co-authored a two volume biography of former Sri Lankan President Junius Richard Jayewardene with Professor K. M. de Silva, (of the University of Ceylon). The second volume was almost entirely the work of de Silva, with Wriggins assisting with interviews and providing feedback on chapter drafts.

While working in the Legislative Reference Service (now the Congressional Research Service) of the Library of Congress in the 1950s and 60s he was invited to join the Policy Planning Council of the State Department, where he stayed for four and a half years before becoming professor at the Political Science Department and the School of International Affairs at Columbia University in New York City in 1967. His studies at Columbia focused on Sri Lanka and he was considered one of the foremost scholars of Sri Lankan studies in the United States.

In 1977 U.S. President Jimmy Carter nominated him to be ambassador to Sri Lanka and the Maldives. He took a leave of absence from Columbia in order to serve as ambassador.

He returned to Columbia University following the end of his diplomatic posting in 1979 and later became the director of its Southern Asian Institute. Wriggins was a Bryce Professor of International Relations Emeritus at Columbia University at the time of his death in 2008.

== Death ==
William Howard Wriggins died on August 30, 2008, in Hanover, New Hampshire. He was survived by his wife, Sally Hovey Wriggins, three children, and six grandchildren.

== Selected works ==
- Ceylon: Dilemmas of a New Nation - 1960
- The ruler’s imperative; strategies for political survival in Asia and Africa, 1968.
- (with K.M. de Silva) J.R. Jayewardene of Sri Lanka: A Political Biography, Volume One: The First Fifty Years, 1988
- (with K.M. de Silva) J.R. Jayewardene of Sri Lanka: A Political Biography, Volume Two: From 1956 to His Retirement, 1994.

Diplomatic posts
Preceded by John H. Reed	U.S. Ambassador to Sri Lanka; 1977–1979	Succeeded by Donald R. Toussaint
