= Paul H. Robinson Jr. =

United States businessman (born 1930)

- Robinson Jr. in 1985

21st United States Ambassador to Canada
- In office July 15, 1981 – September 9, 1985
- President: Ronald Reagan
- Preceded by: Kenneth M. Curtis
- Succeeded by: Thomas M. T. Niles

Personal details
- Born: Paul Heron Robinson Jr. June 22, 1930 (age 96) Chicago, Illinois, U.S.
- Party: Republican Party
- Education: University of Illinois

Paul Heron Robinson Jr. (born June 22, 1930) is an American businessman and diplomat who was United States Ambassador to Canada from 1981 to 1985.

== Early life ==
Robinson was born in Chicago on June 22, 1930. He attended Hinsdale Township High School in Hinsdale, Illinois. After graduating from high school, Robinson attended the University of Illinois, receiving a B.S. in 1953. Robinson served in the United States Navy from 1953 to 1955, achieving the rank of Lieutenant.

== Career ==
Robinson later founded his own business, Robinson, Incorporated, working as a broker for banks and professional institutions. He was also an active member of the Republican Party.

=== U.S. Ambassador to Canada ===
In 1981, President of the United States Ronald Reagan nominated Robinson to be United States Ambassador to Canada. Robinson presented his credentials on July 15, 1981, and served in Ottawa until September 9, 1985. He began discussions with the Liberal government headed by Prime Minister of Canada Pierre Trudeau about easing trade restrictions between the U.S. and Canada. With the election of Progressive Conservative Brian Mulroney in the 1984 Canadian federal election, these talks were expanded to discussions about a comprehensive free trade agreement. These discussions were the starting point of a process that would ultimately see the signing of the Canada – United States Free Trade Agreement on October 4, 1988.

Diplomatic posts
Preceded by Kenneth M. Curtis	United States Ambassador to Canada; July 15, 1981 – September 9, 1985	Succeeded by Thomas Niles
