= 1944 Maine gubernatorial election =

- September 11, 1944
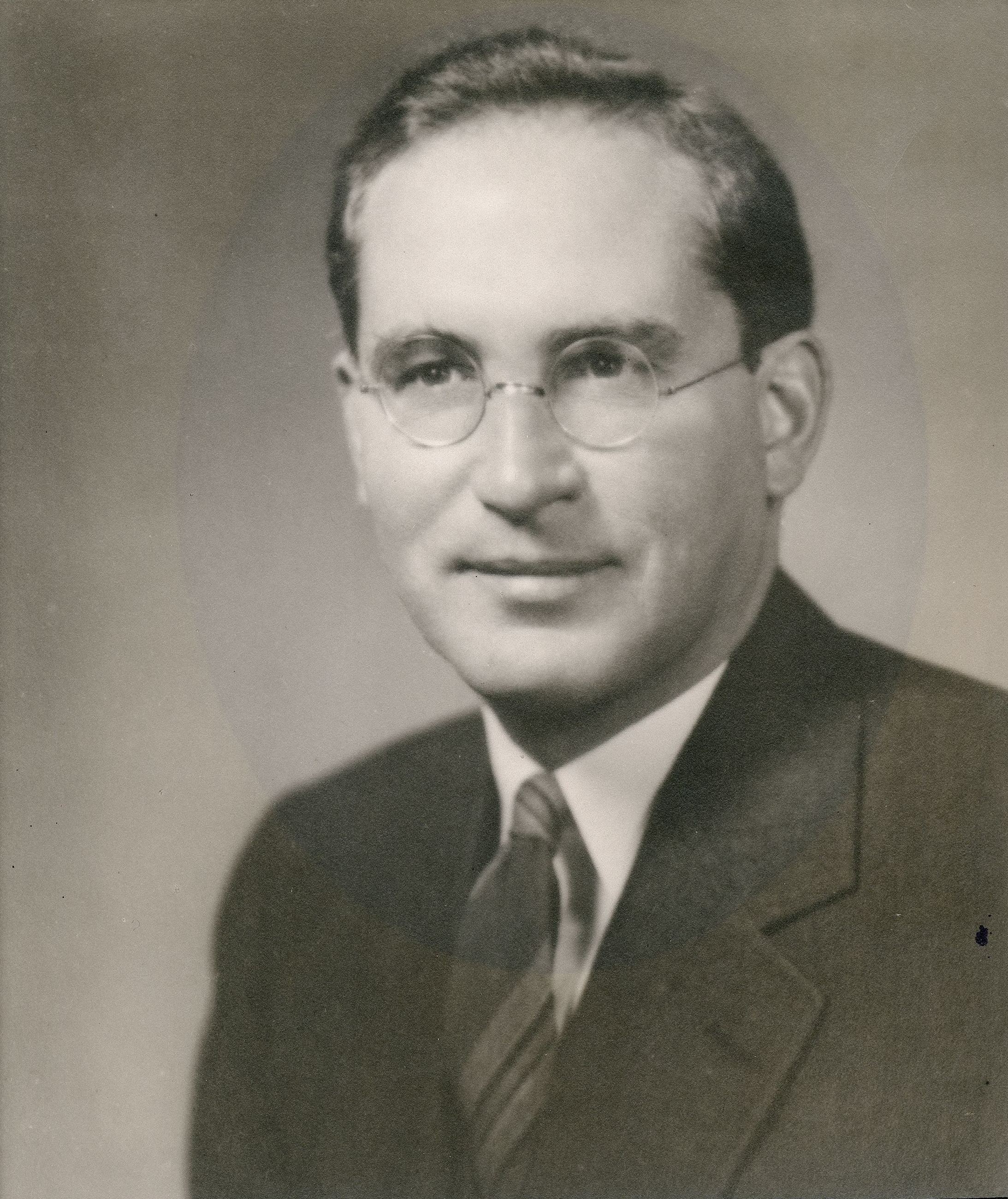

Nominee	Horace Hildreth	Paul J. Jullien
Party	Republican	Democratic
Popular vote	131,849	55,781
Percentage	70.27%	29.73%
- County results Hildreth: 60–70% 70–80% 80–90% Jullien: 50–60%
Governor before election
Sumner Sewall
Republican
Elected Governor
Horace A. Hildreth
Republican

The 1944 Maine gubernatorial election took place on September 11, 1944. Incumbent Republican Governor Sumner Sewall, chose—in keeping with traditione—not to seek re-election after two terms. Republican Maine Senate President Horace Hildreth faced off against Democrat Paul J. Jullien, and defeated him in one of the most lopsided elections in Maine history.

== Results ==
1944 Gubernatorial Election, Maine
Party	Candidate	Votes	%	±%
Republican	Horace A. Hildreth	131,849	70.27%	−
Democratic	Paul J. Jullien	55,781	29.73%	−
Majority		76,068	40.54%	
