= 1970 Maine gubernatorial election =

- November 3, 1970
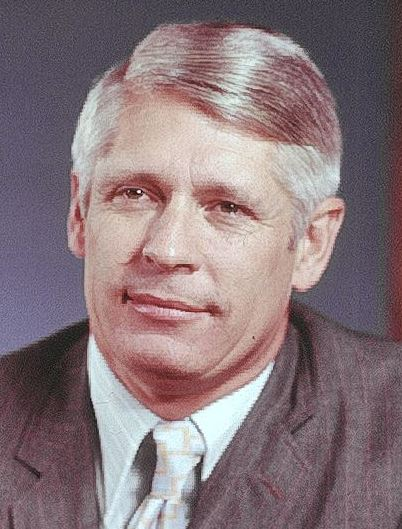

Nominee	Kenneth Curtis	James Erwin
Party	Democratic	Republican
Popular vote	163,138	162,248
Percentage	50.14%	49.86%
- Curtis: 50–60% 60–70% 70–80% 80–90% >90% Erwin: 50–60% 60–70% 70–80% 80–90% >90% Tie: 50%
Governor before election
Kenneth M. Curtis
Democratic
Elected Governor
Kenneth M. Curtis
Democratic

The 1970 Maine gubernatorial election took place on November 3, 1970. Incumbent Democratic Governor of Maine Kenneth M. Curtis chose to seek re-election. Curtis won a landslide victory in the Democratic primary. His general election opponent was Maine Attorney General James Erwin, the Republican nominee. Erwin had also easily won his respective party primary and received the Republican nomination for governor. Curtis narrowly defeated Erwin, in one of the closest elections in Maine history – the final margin of victory was a mere 890 votes. Curtis received 163,138 votes (50.1%), while Erwin had 162,248 votes (49.9%).

== Background ==
Although Governor Curtis kept his promise not to raise taxes, his creation of a new income tax law in 1969 caused his approval rating to fall. As a result of the new taxes, the debate about the expansion of state government became the main issue of the campaign. During his tenure, Curtis proposed gun control legislation, which would deny ownership to convicted felons, drug addicts, and those in mental institutions. This was quite controversial and irritated gun owners throughout the state of Maine. In January 1970, Curtis strongly pledged support for an oil refinery at Machiasport. Environmentalists, as well as the Maine Times – a recently established newspaper – opposed this proposal.

Prior to announcing his re-election candidacy, Curtis commissioned a poll of himself versus potential candidate James S. Erwin, conducted by consultant Oliver Quayle. The results of the poll showed Curtis trailing Erwin by a 28% margin. Quayle told Curtis that he had "never seen an incumbent in more trouble."

== Democratic primary ==
=== Candidates ===
- Kenneth M. Curtis, incumbent Governor of Maine
- Plato Truman, perennial candidate

Incumbent governor Kenneth M. Curtis was challenged by perennial candidate Plato Truman for the Democratic nomination. Despite Truman's perennial candidate status, Curtis only defeated Truman by 13,786 votes on primary day, June 15, 1970. Curtis received 33,052 votes (63.18%) against Truman's 19,266 votes (36.82%).

Primary results by county Curtis: 50–60% 60–70% 70–80%

Democratic Primary – June 15, 1970
Party	Candidate	Votes	%
Democratic	Kenneth M. Curtis (Incumbent)	33,052	63.18
Democratic	Plato Truman	19,266	36.82
Total votes		52,318	100

== Republican primary ==
=== Candidates ===
- James S. Erwin, Attorney General and former State Senator
- Calvin Grass

In mid-February 1970, James S. Erwin, a lawyer, Maine Senator, and World War II veteran declared his candidacy for the Republican nomination. Calvin Grass also entered the race. The primary election took place on June 15, 1970. Erwin defeated Grass in a landslide, with 72,760 votes (89.18%) versus 8,898 votes (10.9%), respectively.

Primary results by county Erwin: 80–90% >90%

Republican Primary – June 15, 1970
Party	Candidate	Votes	%
Republican	James S. Erwin	72,760	89.18
Republican	Calvin Grass	8,898	10.9
Total votes		81,658	100

== Campaign and Debate ==
The campaign boiled down basically to the issue of the economy in state government. Erwin asserted that 10 per cent cut could be made in the state budget without hurting services. Curtis said that any reduction such as that proposed by Erwin would drastically cut the essential services provided by state government. An early poll conducted by the Dorr Research Corporation in Boston showed Erwin leading Curtis 46% to 39%, with 15% undecided. The first debate between Curtis and Erwin was held on September 24, 1970, which was broadcast on Maine's Education Television Network. According to most observers, Erwin appeared "awkward and not in command", while Curtis was "more poised" and "straightforward." These observers, the Maine Times, and even Erwin himself noted that Curtis won the debate. Another poll conducted by Quayle in early October still showed Erwin ahead of Curtis, despite Curtis' gain in momentum.

== Results ==
In the general election held on November 3, 1970, Curtis defeated Erwin by a mere 890 votes. Erwin blamed the media for his loss, claiming they were biased toward Curtis. Years later, Erwin noted, "I avoided the media. I didn't like them and they didn't like me, in retrospect, I wish I had formed a more beneficial relationship with the media. I think that really hurt my campaign." Curtis' victory has also been attributed to former governor Edmund Muskie's coattails, a popular candidate for re-election to his U. S. senate seat that year.

1970 Maine gubernatorial election results
Party	Candidate	Votes	%	±%
Democratic	Kenneth M. Curtis (incumbent)	163,138	50.14%	−2.98%
Republican	James S. Erwin	162,248	49.86%	+2.98%
Majority		890	0.28%	−5.96%
Democratic hold		Swing		

=== Counties that flipped from Republican to Democratic ===
- Aroostook (largest city: Presque Isle)
- Kennebec (largest city: Augusta)

=== Counties that flipped from Democratic to Republican ===
- Piscataquis (largest municipality: Dover-Foxcroft)
- Sagadahoc (largest town: Bath)
- Somerset (largest town: Skowhegan)
- Washington (largest city: Calais)

== Recount and aftermath ==
Due to the very small margin of victory, a recount was almost immediately conducted. The process lasted 40 days, from November 23 to December 15, with Republicans and Democrats and their lawyers present for the recount. Eventually Governor Curtis was certified as the winner and was sworn in for his second term on January 7, 1971. He remained in office until January 2, 1975, when he was succeeded by James B. Longley. James S. Erwin received the Republican nomination for governor again in 1974, but placed third against Longley and Democrat George J. Mitchell.

== See also ==
- 1962 Maine gubernatorial election
