= 1948 United States Senate election in Maine =

- September 13, 1948
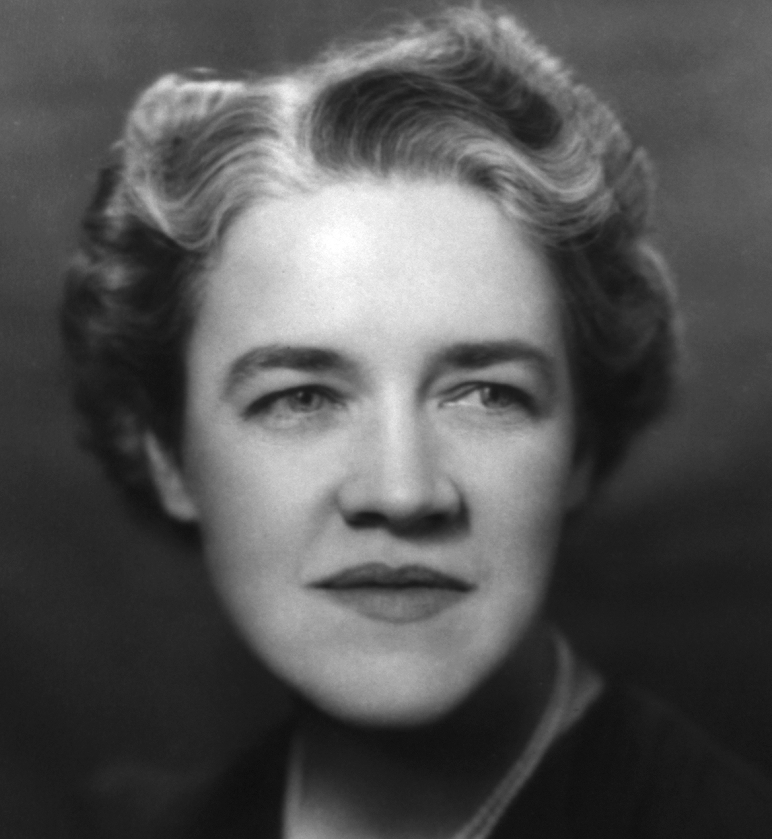

Nominee	Margaret Chase Smith	Adrian Scolten
Party	Republican	Democratic
Popular vote	159,182	64,074
Percentage	71.30%	28.70%
- County results Smith: 50–60% 60–70% 70–80% 80–90% >90%
U.S. senator before election
Wallace H. White Jr.
Republican
Elected U.S. Senator
Margaret Chase Smith
Republican

The 1948 United States Senate election in Maine was held on September 13, 1948. Incumbent Republican U.S. Senator and Senate Majority Leader Wallace White did not seek a fourth term in office.

U.S. Representative Margaret Chase Smith defeated the two most recent Governors of Maine, Horace Hildreth and Sumner Sewall, in the Republican primary. In the general election, Smith resoundingly defeated Democrat Adrian Scolten of Portland.

Smith was the first woman ever elected to a full term in the U.S. Senate without first being appointed. (Note: Hattie Caraway of Arkansas was elected to two terms in the Senate, but she had been appointed first to succeed her dead husband and was an incumbent in each of her elections. In 1938, Gladys Pyle was elected to represent South Dakota in the U.S. Senate for 55 days to complete the term of Peter Norbeck.) Smith's election also made her the first woman to serve in both houses of the United States Congress, as well as the first woman to represent the state of Maine in the Senate.

== Republican primary ==
=== Candidates ===
- Albion P. Beverage
- Horace Hildreth, Governor of Maine since 1945
- Sumner Sewall, former Governor of Maine from 1941 to 1945
- Margaret Chase Smith, U.S. Representative from Skowhegan

=== Results ===
1948 Republican U.S. Senate primary
Party	Candidate	Votes	%
Republican	Margaret Chase Smith	63,786	51.90%
Republican	Horace Hildreth	30,949	25.18%
Republican	Sumner Sewall	21,763	17.71%
Republican	Albion Beverage	6,399	5.21%
Total votes		122,897	100.00%

== Democratic primary ==
=== Candidates ===
- Adrian Scolten, farmer

=== Results ===
Scolten was unopposed for the Democratic nomination.

1948 Democratic U.S. Senate primary
Party	Candidate	Votes	%
Democratic	Adrian Scolten	15,452	100.00%
Total votes		15,452	100.00%

== General election ==
=== Results ===
1948 U.S. Senate election in Maine
Party	Candidate	Votes	%	±%
Republican	Margaret Chase Smith	159,182	71.30%	▲4.63
Democratic	Adrian Scolten	64,074	28.70%	▼4.63
Total votes		223,256	100.00%	

== See also ==
- 1948 United States Senate elections
