= David J. Kennedy (politician) =

American politician (1907–1995)

86th Speaker of the Maine House of Representatives
- In office 1963–1964
- Preceded by: Vinal G. Good
- Succeeded by: Dana Childs
- In office 1967–1972
- Preceded by: Dana Childs
- Succeeded by: Richard Hewes

Member of the Maine House of Representatives from the Milbridge district
- In office 1959–1972

Personal details
- Born: February 11, 1907 Milbridge, Maine, U.S.
- Died: July 11, 1995 (aged 88) Ellsworth, Maine, U.S.
- Party: Republican
- Profession: Pharmacist

David J. Kennedy (February 11, 1907 – July 11, 1995) was a Maine politician and pharmacist. He was a native of Milbridge, Maine. Kennedy, a Republican, represented Milbridge in Washington County from 1959 to 1972, including terms as Speaker of the Maine House of Representatives from 1963 to 1964 and again from 1967 to 1972. He retired from politics in 1972. He was close friends with Portland Democrat Dana Childs and briefly served as a lobbyist for Maine Central Railroad alongside Childs. Kennedy died on July 11, 1995, at Maine Coast Memorial Hospital in Ellsworth of natural causes.
