= 1974 Maine gubernatorial election =

- November 5, 1974
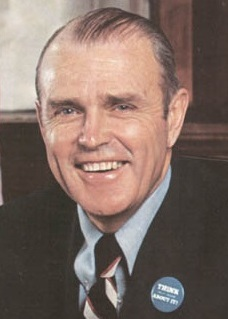

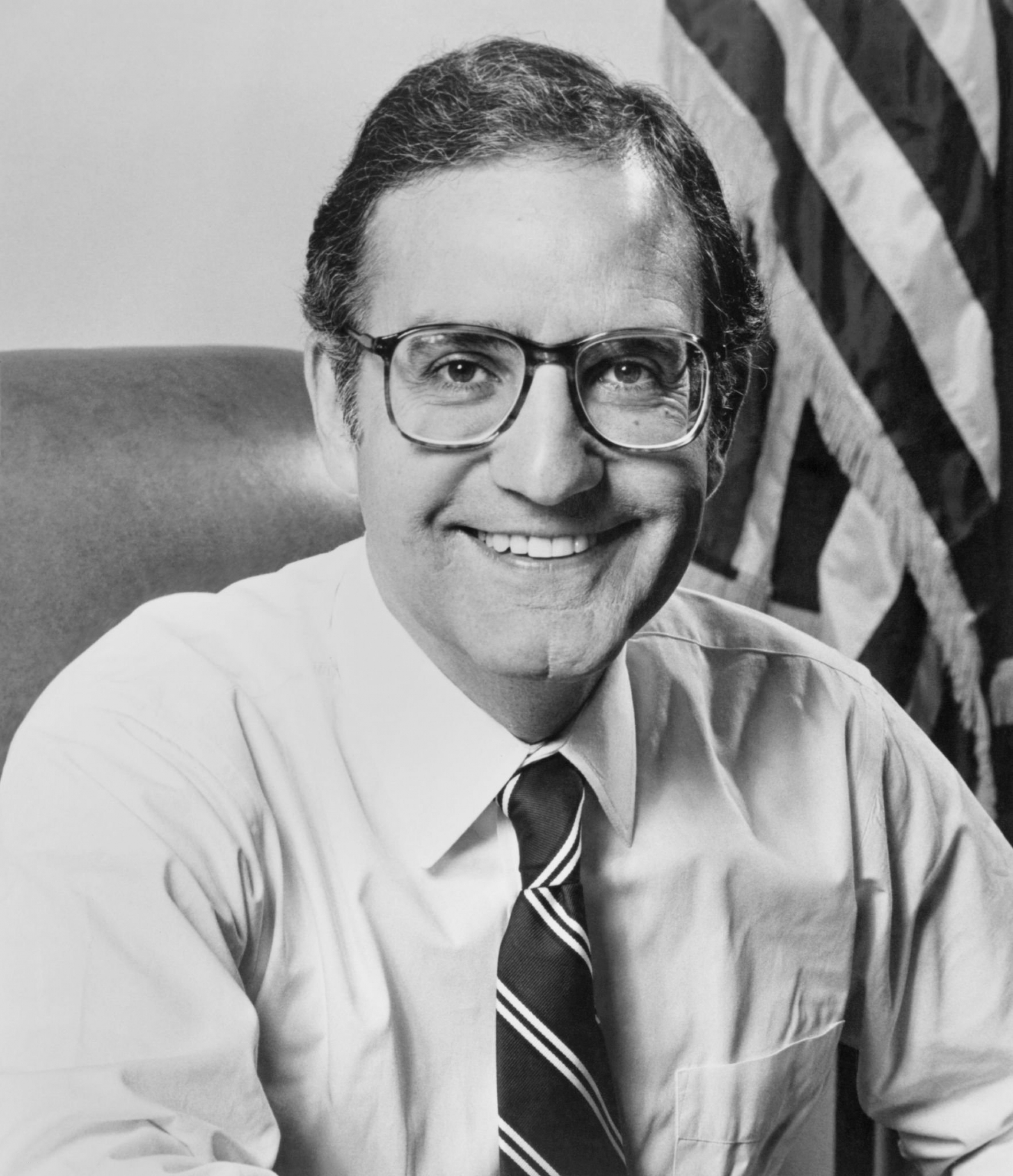

Nominee	James B. Longley	George J. Mitchell	James Erwin
Party	Independent	Democratic	Republican
Popular vote	142,464	132,219	84,176
Percentage	39.70%	36.84%	23.46%
- Longley: 30–40% 40–50% 50–60% 60–70% 70–80% Mitchell: 30–40% 40–50% 50–60% 60–70% 70–80% 80–90% >90% Erwin: 30–40% 40–50% 50–60% 60–70% 70–80% >90% Tie: 40–50%
Governor before election
Kenneth M. Curtis
Democratic
Elected Governor
James B. Longley
Independent

The 1974 Maine gubernatorial election took place in the US state on November 5, 1974. Incumbent Democratic Governor Kenneth M. Curtis was term-limited and could not seek re-election. Independent candidate James B. Longley defeated Democratic Party challenger (and future Senate Majority Leader) George J. Mitchell and Republican James Erwin in a tight three-way contest. Longley's victory made him the first independent (non-party-affiliated) governor in Maine's history.

== Campaign ==
=== Democratic primary ===
George Mitchell was an early front-runner for the governorship in 1974. He had defeated Joseph Brennan and four others in the Democratic primary, and had the backing of popular former governor (and then-U.S. Senator) Edmund Muskie. Many Maine political observers believed Mitchell would be able to easily beat back the challenge from James Erwin and become Maine's next governor.

Mitchell ran on the campaign theme "There are two Maines. There should only be one." He argued that Maine was a gorgeous state with rich natural resources and was a thriving tourist destination, but at the same time it had high unemployment and a large number of Maine families lived below the poverty line. His campaign focused on ways to bring together the two Maines – a place with a protected environment and a strong economy.

==== Candidates ====
- Joseph E. Brennan, member of the Maine Senate, of Portland
- Peter S. Kelley, member of the Maine Senate, of Caribou
- Lloyd LaFountain, attorney, of Biddeford
- Aaron Levine, of Waterville
- George J. Mitchell, attorney, of South Portland
- Jack Smith, of Portland

==== Results ====
Democratic primary results
Party	Candidate	Votes	%
Democratic	George J. Mitchell	33,312	37.52
Democratic	Joseph E. Brennan	23,443	26.41
Democratic	Peter S. Kelley	21,358	24.06
Democratic	Lloyd LaFountain	7,954	8.95
Democratic	Aaron Levine	1,545	1.74
Democratic	Jack Smith	1,165	1.31
Total votes		88,777	100.00

=== Republican primary ===
James Erwin of York, another early front-runner in the race, had served in the Maine House and Senate before winning his first of three terms as attorney general in 1967. He had challenged incumbent governor John H. Reed in the 1966 Republican gubernatorial primary, but Reed would defeat him. In 1970, he won the GOP nomination, but lost the general election by 890 votes to the Democratic incumbent Curtis. Erwin's campaign theme was "Erwin This Time."

Erwin defeated three members of the State Legislature to be renominated by the GOP. The runner up, State Senator Harrison Richardson, was bested by only 1,351 votes.

According to his 2005 obituary, Erwin was "born in New York City and grew up in Englewood, N.J. He spent his summers on his mother's family's farm in South Berwick, which is now the site of Berwick Academy. He graduated from Dartmouth College and served in the Army during World War II."

==== Candidates ====
- James S. Erwin, attorney general of Maine and Republican nominee for governor in 1970, of Pittston
- Harrison Richardson, member of the Maine Senate, of Cumberland
- Stanley Sproul, member of the Maine House of Representatives and mayor of Augusta
- Wakine Tanous, member of the Maine Senate, of East Millinocket

==== Results ====
Republican primary results
Party	Candidate	Votes	%
Republican	James S. Erwin	38,044	39.30
Republican	Harrison Richardson	36,693	37.91
Republican	Wakine Tanous	18,786	19.41
Republican	Stanley Sproul	7,954	8.22
Total votes		96,794	100.00

=== Independent candidate ===
James B. Longley was the owner of a successful insurance agency in Lewiston, who got his first opportunity in statewide politics when then-Governor Curtis asked him to lead a state government commission called the Maine Management and Cost Survey Commission, which was intended to make government more efficient, and cut costs. After some initial reluctance, Longley accepted the position and pursued the job with vigor.

Longley made several recommendations that were projected to save the state in excess of $24 million. One of his major proposals included restructuring the Maine university system, which he felt was grossly inefficient. His work at the commission gave him a prominent statewide profile, something he decided to try to turn into an electoral mandate when Governor Curtis retired in 1974.

Longley had been a lifelong Democrat, but due to earning a maverick reputation acting in a non-partisan role on the cost-cutting commission and because he inadvertently missed the filing deadline for party candidates, he ran as an independent. Some Maine observers believed he knew he would be unable to beat both former Muskie adviser George Mitchell and state Senator Joseph Brennan in a Democratic primary, causing him to not file with the party. He ran on the slogan "Think About It", a phrase he often used with insurance customers to get them to consider his products.

=== The issues ===
In 1974, the economy was volatile and inflation was high. Maine's economy was in a weak position with high unemployment and low wages, and all three candidates focused on this economic uncertainty in their respective campaigns. Issues such as oil prices, health care, the environment and care for the elderly were also major themes that dominated the debate by the candidates.

Longley campaigned on a platform of cutting government and making it more efficient, hoping to capitalize on the reputation he had earned with the commission. However, he struggled to get attention in the race, as most media outlets focused on Mitchell and James Erwin (who had run for governor the previous cycle as well). Toward the tail end of the campaign, however, increased attention was focused on Longley, with newspapers profiling his candidacy and speculating that he was on par with the other two candidates. When the Bangor Daily News issued an endorsement of Longley, many observers believed it gave Longley instant legitimacy.

== General election ==
An Associated Press poll three days before the election showed Mitchell and Erwin running neck and neck, with Longley trailing by double digits. However, that same poll noted that 37 percent of the electorate was still undecided, leaving open the possibility that they could swing any direction at the last minute.

On Election Day, Longley won with 40% of the vote, followed by Mitchell at 37%, and Erwin with 23%.

Mitchell attributed his loss to "distrust and cynicism about politics and politicians [after Watergate]", "widespread concern over the economy", and "the fact that James Longley had conducted a very excellent campaign."

=== Results ===
1974 Maine gubernatorial election results
Party	Candidate	Votes	%	±%
Independent	James B. Longley	142,464	39.70%	+39.70%
Democratic	George J. Mitchell	132,219	36.84%	−13.30%
Republican	James S. Erwin	84,176	23.46%	−26.40%
Majority		10,245	2.85%	
Independent gain from Democratic		Swing		

==== Counties that flipped from Democratic to Independent ====
- Androscoggin (largest city: Lewiston)
- Kennebec (largest city: Augusta)
- Oxford (largest town: Rumford)
- Penobscot (largest city: Bangor)

==== Counties that flipped from Republican to Independent ====
- Franklin (largest town: Farmington)
- Hancock (largest municipality: Ellsworth)
- Knox (largest municipality: Rockland)
- Lincoln (largest city: Waldoboro)
- Piscataquis (largest municipality: Dover-Foxcroft)
- Sagadahoc (largest town: Bath)
- Somerset (largest town: Skowhegan)
- Waldo (largest city: Belfast)

==== Counties that flipped from Republican to Democratic ====
- Washington (largest city: Calais)
