= Donald R. Toussaint =

American diplomat

Donald R. Toussaint (May 21, 1927 – January 1986) was appointed by President Jimmy Carter as United States ambassador to Sri Lanka and the Maldives, and served from 21 January 1980 to 7 January 1982.

He was born in Oakland, California and got his PhD from Stanford University. He joined the Foreign Service in 1956 and was posted in Indonesia, the United Nations, and Iran. He was Deputy Assistant Secretary of State for International Organization Affairs from 1976 to 1977 and deputy coordination of the U.N. Conference on Science and Technology from 1977 to 1978.

Diplomatic posts
Preceded by William Howard Wriggins	U.S. Ambassador to Sri Lanka; 1980–1982	Succeeded by John H. Reed
