= Dana Childs =

American politician

Dana Childs (December 15, 1922 – April 23, 1999) was a Maine politician, lawyer and jurist. Childs, who served as both a Democrat and Republican, represented Portland in the Maine House of Representatives. He served a two-year stint as Speaker of the Maine House of Representatives as a Democrat from 1965 to 1966. In 1966, Childs ran for the Democratic nomination for Governor of Maine, but lost to eventual Governor Kenneth M. Curtis.

In 1973, Childs was nominated and later confirmed for the position of probate judge for Cumberland County largely because of his friendship with Republican leader David J. Kennedy. Childs also served as a lobbyist for the Maine Central Railroad alongside Kennedy after their political careers ended. He continued that position until the 1990s. Besides his political and law careers, Childs was an avid horse enthusiast, serving as President of the Maine Harness Horsemen's Association. He died at his home in Westbrook on April 23, 1999, from a heart attack.
