= Jon A. Lund =

American attorney and politician (born 1928)

Jon A. Lund (born November 6, 1928) is an American attorney and politician from Maine. Lund, a Republican, served as Maine Attorney General from 1972 to 1975. Prior to his time as the first full-time attorney general in Maine history, Lund was an assistant country attorney for Kennebec County, member of the Augusta City Council and two-time county attorney for Kennebec County. He was also elected to the Maine House of Representatives (1965–1966; 1969–1972) and Maine Senate (1967–1968).

During his time as attorney general, Lund took prominent stances on many controversial issues affecting Maine at the time, even though some were outside of the jurisdiction of his office. Among these stances included opposition to the proposed Dickey-Lincoln Dam in Northern Maine, which he opposed on environmental grounds. The project was eventually stopped in 1984.

Lund is a graduate of Bowdoin College and Harvard Law School.

Legal offices
Preceded by James S. Erwin	Maine Attorney General; 1972–1975	Succeeded by Joseph E. Brennan
