= Kenneth M. Curtis =

American lawyer and former politician (born 1931)

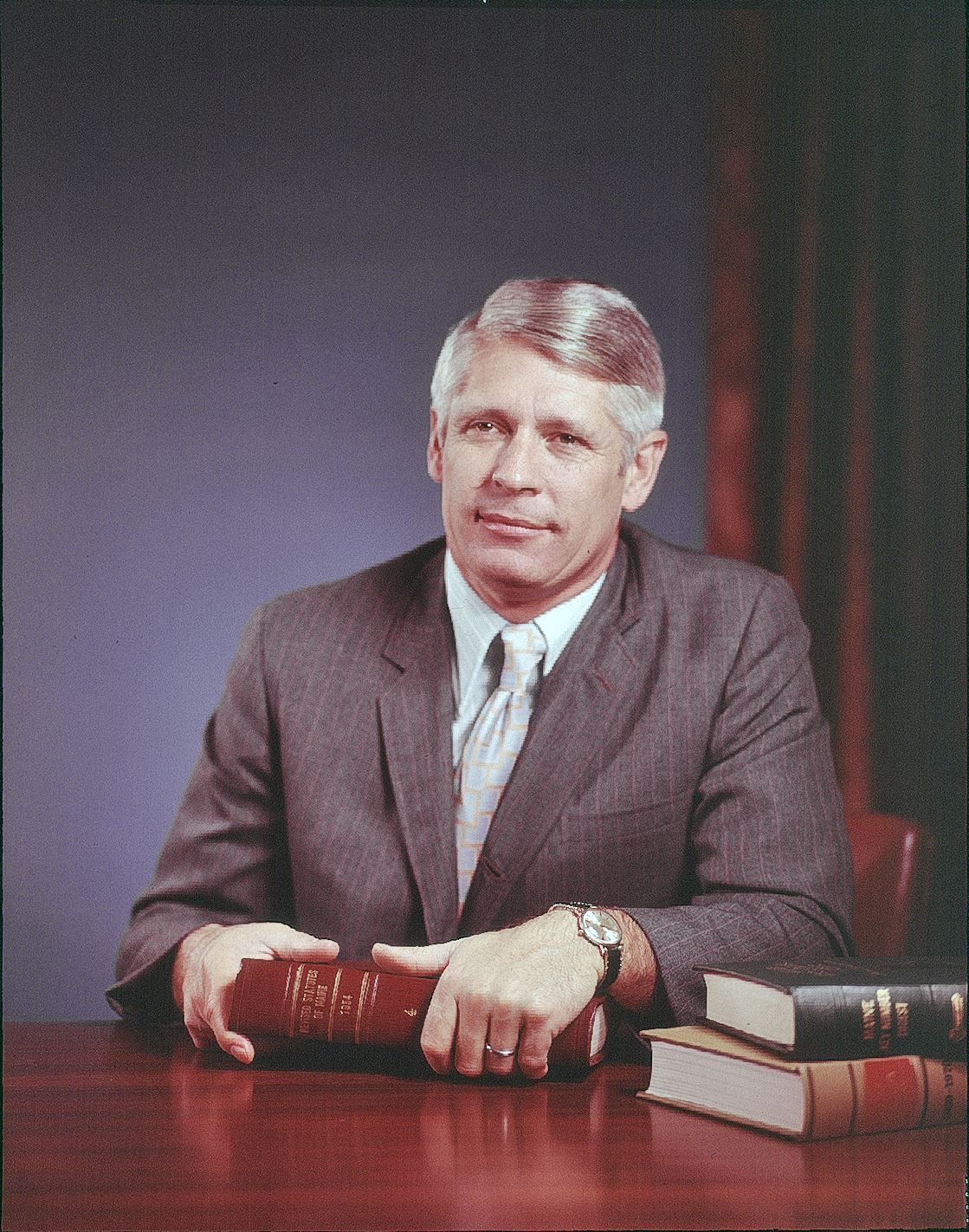
- Curtis, c. 1967–1975

United States Ambassador to Canada
- In office October 5, 1979 – January 20, 1981
- President: Jimmy Carter
- Preceded by: Thomas O. Enders
- Succeeded by: Paul H. Robinson Jr.

Chair of the Democratic National Committee
- In office January 21, 1977 – January 27, 1978
- Preceded by: Robert S. Strauss
- Succeeded by: John White

68th Governor of Maine
- In office January 5, 1967 – January 2, 1975
- Preceded by: John H. Reed
- Succeeded by: James B. Longley

41st Secretary of State of Maine
- In office 1965–1966
- Governor: John H. Reed
- Preceded by: Paul A. MacDonald
- Succeeded by: Joseph T. Edgar

Personal details
- Born: Kenneth Merwin Curtis; February 8, 1931 (age 95) Leeds, Maine, U.S.
- Party: Democratic
- Spouse: Polly Brown (m. 1956)
- Children: 2
- Education: Maine Maritime Academy (BS); Portland University (LLB)

Kenneth Merwin Curtis (born February 8, 1931) is an American attorney, politician, and diplomat from Maine. He was the secretary of State of Maine from 1965 to 1966, the 68th governor of Maine from 1967 to 1975, and the United States Ambassador to Canada from 1979 to 1981. Curtis is a member of the Democratic Party and was later Of counsel at the Curtis Thaxter law firm in Portland, Maine, which he founded in 1975. Following the death of George Nigh in July 2025, Curtis is the earliest serving living former American governor, and is the last living former American governor who assumed office in the 1960s.

== Early life and education ==
Curtis was born in Curtis Corner, Leeds, Maine to Archie, a fifth-generation farmer of the family land there, and Harriet (Turner) Curtis. He attended Cony High School in Augusta and graduated in 1949. He then attended Maine Maritime Academy and received a Bachelor of Science in 1952. Curtis served in the United States Naval Reserve from 1953 to 1955 and was a lieutenant commander in the Korean War before leaving the Navy to pursue a law degree. He was admitted to the Maine Bar in 1958 and received a LL.B. from Portland University School of Law in 1959 and a LL.D. from Bates College in 1981.

== Political career ==
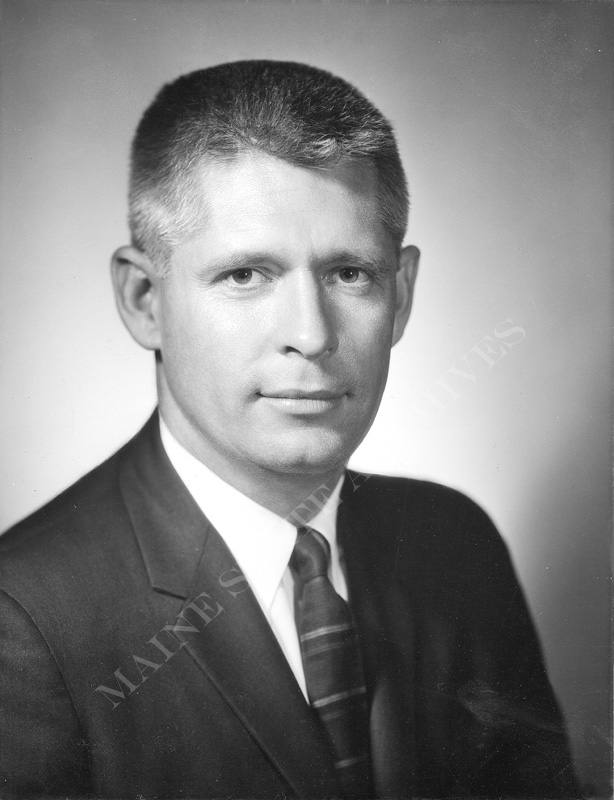
Curtis as Maine Secretary of State.

Curtis's political career began in 1956 when he worked for James Oliver's Democratic campaign for Maine's 1st congressional district. Oliver lost to Robert Hale in 1956 but won in 1958 with Curtis serving as campaign manager. Curtis worked as Oliver's assistant from 1959 to 1961. In 1963, Curtis was appointed Maine Coordinator for the Area Redevelopment Administration by President of the United States John F. Kennedy and served in that position until 1964 when he campaigned for the 1st district seat but narrowly lost to Stanley R. Tupper. Curtis served as the Maine Secretary of State from 1965 to 1966.

=== 1966 Campaign for Governor ===
In 1966, Curtis defeated Carlton Day Reed Jr., the Maine Senate President and former Speaker of the House, and Dana Childs, the incumbent Speaker of the House, in a primary election to challenge incumbent Republican Governor John Reed. In the November election, with campaign help from Robert F. Kennedy, Curtis defeated Reed by 20,234 votes.

== Governorship 1967-1975 ==
Curtis was the 68th Governor of Maine, and the youngest governor in the United States at the time. In 1968, Curtis merged the University of Maine at Orono with five teachers' colleges throughout the state, creating the University of Maine System. In 1969, Curtis and the Republican legislature enacted Maine's first income tax, which as of 2021 still provides the bulk of the state's revenue. The administration also enacted several notable environmental protection measures, such as the Site Location of Development Act, and created the Department of Environmental Protection. Curtis chaired the New England Governors’ conference from 1969 to 1970 and was Chairman of the Environmental Task Force of the National Governors Association in the early 1970s.

In February 1970, Curtis announced his re-election bid, defeating Plato Truman in the Democratic primary and faced Maine Attorney General James Erwin in the general election. Initially the underdog, Curtis managed to gain momentum following a strong debate performance. Erwin asserted that a ten percent cut could be made in the state budget without hurting services. Curtis said that any reduction such as that proposed by Erwin would drastically cut the essential services provided by state government. Curtis would end up being reelected, defeating Erwin by 890 votes. Curtis was certified as the winner, and then sworn in for his second term on January 7, 1971.

Curtis was the first Maine governor to serve two four-year terms (or 8 full years). In November 1971 Curtis made an 11th‐hour appeal urging voters to reject a referendum aimed at repealing the state's two‐year‐old income tax. In 1972, he reorganized the Maine state government to cabinet system, replacing 150 independent agencies with 16 departments. The heads of these departments would be appointed by each currently-serving governor, whereas previously they had remained in their positions after being appointed by former governors.

in June 1973 Curtis signed a bill that eliminated the state's criminal penalties for knowingly being present where marijuana is kept. Conviction under the law is punishable by a fine of up to $1,000, or imprisonment of up to 11 months, or both. in December 1973 Curtis asked Maine residents in a televised address to voluntarily reduce their consumption of gasoline, heating oil and kerosene.

According to the Maine Historical Society, Curtis was "one of a few sitting governors to climb Mt. Katahdin and canoe the Allagash River." Curtis asked James B. Longley to lead a state government commission called The Maine Management and Cost Survey Commission. Longley made several recommendations that were projected to save the state in excess of $24 million. Curtis was prevented from running for a third term in 1974 due to term limits. He was succeeded by Longley, who had been elected as an independent in November.

=== Post-gubernatorial career ===
In 1975, Curtis founded the Curtis Thaxter law firm with several colleagues, and he served as chairman of the Democratic National Committee from 1977 to 1978. Curtis served as the United States Ambassador to Canada from 1979 to 1981. His tenure coincided with the Iran hostage crisis and the Canadian Caper, and Curtis handled communication regarding the status of six American diplomats being sheltered by Canadian embassy staff in Tehran and eventually rescued by the CIA. Curtis served as the 11th president of Maine Maritime Academy from 1986 to 1994.

== Family ==
Curtis met Pauline "Polly" Brown while they both worked at Sears in downtown Portland. They were married in 1956. The Curtises had two children, Susan (born 1959) and Angela (born 1961), both of whom were born with cystic fibrosis. On Tuesday, July 20, 1970, Susan died at Central Maine General Hospital in Lewiston of respiratory failure. She was 11 years old. Since Ken was serving his first term as governor, the family received numerous monetary donations in Susan's name, and friends and political supporters encouraged the Curtises to start a nonprofit organization with the funds. After researching specific needs throughout Maine, the newly-formed Susan L. Curtis Foundation opened Camp Susan Curtis in Stoneham, Maine in 1974 to serve economically disadvantaged Maine children. The Curtises' second daughter, Angela Curtis Hall, who was also born with cystic fibrosis, died in 1996. She was 34. The Curtises semi-retired to Florida from 1997 to 2017 and then returned to Maine. As of January 2021, they live in Scarborough. Curtis was later Of Counsel at Curtis Thaxter, the Portland law firm he founded in 1975.

== Appointments and honors ==
Boards	Honorary Degrees
Board of Directors, KeyCorp; Board of Directors, Bowater Incorporated; Board of Directors, New England Telephone Co. Alberta Northeast Gas Ltd. Advisory Board; Board of Trustees, Susan L. Curtis Foundation; Council of Former American Ambassadors; Board of Visitors, University of Maine School of Law	University of Maine; University of New Brunswick; Bowdoin College; Colby College; Bates College; University of New Hampshire; Mount Allison University; Saint Joseph's College of Maine; St. Francis College; Unity College

Political offices
Preceded by Paul A. MacDonald	Secretary of State of Maine; 1965–1966	Succeeded by Joseph T. Edgar
Preceded by John H. Reed	Governor of Maine; 1967–1975	Succeeded by James B. Longley
Party political offices
Preceded by Maynard Dolloff	Democratic nominee for Governor of Maine; 1966, 1970	Succeeded by George J. Mitchell
Preceded by Robert S. Strauss	Chair of the Democratic National Committee; 1977–1978	Succeeded by John White
Diplomatic posts
Preceded by Thomas O. Enders	United States Ambassador to Canada; 1979–1981	Succeeded by Paul H. Robinson Jr.
Honorary titles
Preceded by George Nigh	Earliest Serving Governor Still Living; 2025–present	Current holder
U.S. order of precedence (ceremonial)
Preceded by Martha McSally as Former U.S. Senator	Order of precedence of the United States; Within Maine	Succeeded by John R. McKernan Jr. as Former Governor
Preceded by Robert J. Bentley as Former Governor	Order of precedence of the United States; Outside Maine	Succeeded by John R. McKernan Jr. as Former Governor
