= 1962 Maine gubernatorial election =

- November 6, 1962
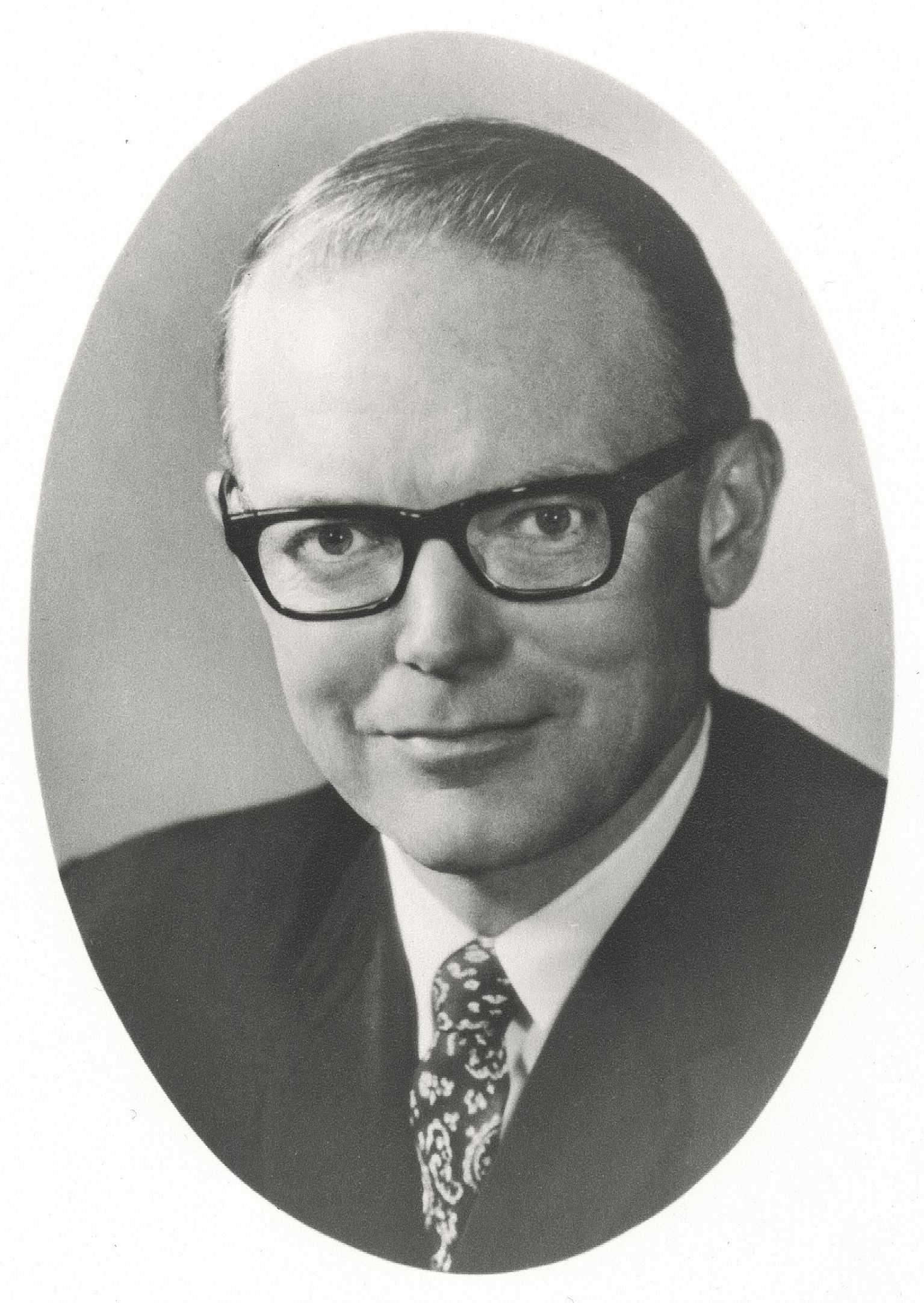

Nominee	John H. Reed	Maynard Dolloff
Party	Republican	Democratic
Popular vote	146,604	146,121
Percentage	50.08%	49.92%
- Reed: 50–60% 60–70% 70–80% 80–90% >90% Dolloff: 50–60% 60–70% 70–80% 80–90% >90% Tie: 50%
Governor before election
John H. Reed
Republican
Elected Governor
John H. Reed
Republican

The 1962 Maine gubernatorial election took place on November 6, 1962. Incumbent Republican Governor John Reed was seeking his first full term in office. As President of the Maine Senate, Reed had assumed the governorship upon the death of his predecessor, Democrat Clinton Clauson, and had been elected in his own right in a 1960 special election to finish the final two years of Clauson's term.

Reed faced off against Democratic challenger Maynard C. Dolloff, who narrowly dispatched Richard Dubord in the Democratic primary. Reed was re-elected by one of the narrowest margins in Maine history — a mere 483 votes. To date, this is the most recent time a Republican won a majority of the popular vote in a Maine gubernatorial election.

== Republican primary ==
Governor Reed was unopposed in the GOP primary.

== Democratic primary ==
=== Candidates ===
- Maynard C. Dolloff, former State Grange Master and candidate for governor in 1958
- Richard Dubord, Democratic National Committee member, former mayor of Waterville

=== Results ===
Dolloff won the Democratic nomination by a narrow margin, defeating DNC member Richard Dubord by 227 votes.

Democratic primary results
Party	Candidate	Votes	%
Democratic	Maynard C. Dolloff	18,234	50.31
Democratic	Richard Dubord	18,007	49.69
Total votes		36,241	100.00

== Results ==
Maine gubernatorial results
Party	Candidate	Votes	%	±%
Republican	John H. Reed (Incumbent)	146,604	50.08%	−
Democratic	Maynard C. Dolloff	146,121	49.92%	−
Majority		483	0.17%	
Republican hold		Swing		

=== Counties that flipped from Democratic to Republican ===
- Kennebec (largest city: Augusta)

=== Counties that flipped from Republican to Democratic ===
- Oxford (largest town: Rumford)
