= Hoddy Hildreth =

American politician, conservationist (1931–2019)

Horace Augustus "Hoddy" Hildreth Jr. (December 17, 1931 – December 12, 2019) was an American lawyer, politician, business executive, and conservationist in Maine. He served in the Maine Senate.

== Biography ==
Born in Cambridge, Massachusetts, the son of Horace Hildreth and Katherine Cable Wing Hildreth, Hoddy Hildreth grew up in Cumberland, Maine. He was 14 years old when his father was elected Governor of Maine, at which time his family moved to the Maine State House in Augusta, Maine.

He attended Cony High School for three years before transferring to Deerfield Academy. Like his father and grandfather, he graduated from Bowdoin College. In May 1953, while Hoddy Hildreth was a senior at Bowdoin, President Eisenhower appointed his father United States Ambassador to Pakistan. He spent his final year of undergraduate studies at Forman Christian College in Lahore, Pakistan, before returning to Bowdoin to take his final exams and participate in commencement as a 1954 graduate. He earned a bachelor's degree in English.

In 1956, Hoddy Hildreth married the artist Alison Hildreth (née Derby). They raised four boys, Daniel, Hasket, Malcolm, and Thomas.

He earned a law degree from Columbia University and went on to practice law in Maine at Pierce Atwood, at the time a small firm. A great deal of Hildreth's work was in lobbying for paper companies, but this work was broken off by his successful run for a state senate seat in 1966.

Hildreth served as a Republican in the Maine Senate from Cumberland County, in the 103rd legislature, 1966–1967. He was chairman of the Legislative Research Committee. In 1968, At the end of his term in the Maine Senate, he ran for a seat in the U.S. Congress from Maine's 1st congressional district, losing to incumbent Democrat Peter Kyros. Following his defeat, he started his own law firm which lobbied in Augusta for environmental causes.

Hildreth left his law firm in 1979 in order to serve as chief executive of Diversified Communications, the media company that his father had founded. He continued to serve on the board of directors after his retirement.

A dedicated conservationist, Hildreth served on the boards of the Conservation Law Foundation and the Maine League of Conservation Voters.

Hildreth died in 2019.
