= John H. Reed =

American politician (1921–2012)

John Reed
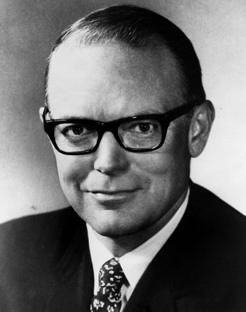

United States Ambassador to Sri Lanka and the Maldives
- In office February 22, 1982 – September 3, 1985
- President: Ronald Reagan
- Preceded by: Donald Toussaint
- Succeeded by: James Spain
- In office August 23, 1976 – June 1, 1977
- President: Gerald Ford; Jimmy Carter
- Preceded by: Chris Van Hollen
- Succeeded by: Howard Wriggins

2nd Chair of the National Transportation Safety Board
- In office 1970–1976
- Preceded by: Joseph J. O'Connell, Jr.
- Succeeded by: Webster B. Todd, Jr.

Chair of the National Governors Association
- In office July 25, 1965 – July 4, 1966
- Preceded by: Grant Sawyer
- Succeeded by: William Guy

67th Governor of Maine
- In office December 30, 1959 – January 5, 1967
- Preceded by: Clinton Clauson
- Succeeded by: Kenneth Curtis

Personal details
- Born: January 5, 1921 Fort Fairfield, Maine, U.S.
- Died: October 31, 2012 (aged 91) Washington, D.C., U.S.
- Party: Republican
- Spouse: Cora Davison (m. 1944; died 2004)
- Education: University of Maine (BA)
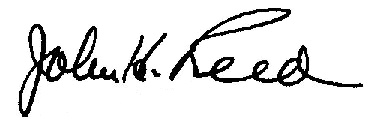
- Signature

John Hathaway Reed (January 5, 1921 – October 31, 2012) was an American diplomat and politician who served as the 67th Governor of Maine, holding office during the 1960s. Reed, a Republican, took office following the death of Governor Clinton Clauson.

== Political career ==
Reed was born in Fort Fairfield, Maine, in 1921. He graduated from the University of Maine in 1942. He served in the United States Navy in World War II, and graduated from Harvard's Navy Supply Corps School in 1944.

After coming home, he was elected to the Maine House of Representatives in 1954. He served one term before being elected to the Maine Senate. At the start of his second senate term, he was elected Senate President; an office which, in Maine, is first in line for the governorship.

=== Governor of Maine (1959–1967) ===
Upon Clauson's death, Reed became Maine's fourth governor of 1959. He was preceded, in that single year, by Clauson, Robert Haskell, and Edmund Muskie. He was then elected over Democrat Frank M. Coffin to finish Clauson's term in 1960. He was narrowly re-elected over Democrat Maynard C. Dolloff in 1962 to serve a 4-year term as governor. Reed was instrumental in starting educational television in Maine, and oversaw the creation of a network of University of Maine colleges, now known as the University of Maine System. In 1965, Reed offered Lewiston to be the event venue location for the Muhammad Ali vs. Sonny Liston rematch; it remains the only heavyweight title fight held in the state of Maine. In 1966, he lost re-election to Kenneth Curtis by 20,234 votes.

=== After governorship ===
Reed was a strong supporter of the Vietnam War and was close to President Lyndon Johnson, a Democrat, who appointed him to the National Transportation Safety Board in 1966. After serving in that post, he was appointed by President Richard Nixon, a Republican, to be the US ambassador to Sri Lanka and the Maldives (shared country accreditation by ambassador).

Reed was appointed ambassador to Sri Lanka and the Maldives a second time by President Ronald Reagan in 1981.

Reed lived in Washington, D.C., after his retirement. He died there on October 31, 2012.

== Marriage and children ==
On March 24, 1944, Reed married Cora Mitchell Davison at the Newport Naval Chapel. Cora Davison was born on August 13, 1920, in Haverhill, Massachusetts, to John A. Davison and Ruth Hoitt.

Cora Davison was a graduate of Haverhill High School in 1938 and from the former McIntosh School of Business in Lawrence, in 1940. She worked as a secretary in the office of the Clarence Walker Shoe Factory in Haverhill prior to moving with her family to Newport, where she took a position as executive secretary to the commanding officer of the Newport Naval Supply Depot, during World War II. Here she met her future husband.

John and Cora had two daughters. His wife Cora died on November 7, 2004, at Washington Home and Hospice Center after a long illness.

Political offices
Preceded by Clinton Clauson	Governor of Maine; 1959–1967	Succeeded by Kenneth Curtis
Preceded by Grant Sawyer	Chair of the National Governors Association; 1965–1966	Succeeded by William Guy
Party political offices
Preceded by Horace Hildreth	Republican nominee for Governor of Maine; 1960, 1962, 1966	Succeeded by James Erwin
Government offices
Preceded by Joseph J. O'Connell Jr.	Chairman of the National Transportation Safety Board; 1970–1976	Succeeded by Webster B. Todd Jr.
Diplomatic posts
Preceded by Chris Van Hollen	Ambassador to Sri Lanka and the Maldives; 1976–1977	Succeeded by Howard Wriggins
Preceded by Donald Toussaint	Ambassador to Sri Lanka and the Maldives; 1982–1985	Succeeded by James Spain
