= Carlton Day Reed Jr. =

American politician

Member of the Maine Senate from the 18th district
- In office 1962–1970

Personal details
- Born: August 11, 1930 Bath, Maine, U.S.
- Died: December 8, 2012 (aged 82) Woolwich, Maine, U.S.
- Party: Democratic
- Education: Colby College

Carlton Day Reed Jr. (August 11, 1930 - December 8, 2012) was an American politician from Maine. A Democrat, Reed served one term in the Maine House of Representatives (1958-1960) and 4 terms in the Maine Senate (1962-1970). He was born in Bath, Maine and a lifelong resident of Woolwich, Maine.

Reed studied until 8th grade in a one-room schoolhouse in Woolwich. He graduated from Morse High School in Bath before attending Colby College. He graduated from Colby in 1953.

Following the 1964 defeat of the Republican Party and Barry Goldwater, control of the Maine Senate went to the Democratic Party for the first time since 1911. Reed was elected President of the Maine Senate. Two years later, the Republican Party regained control of the Maine Senate and Reed and his fellow Democrats were relegated to opposition. In 1966, Reed sought the Democratic nomination for governor, losing to Kenneth M. Curtis. Following re-election to his 4th term in 1968, Reed was elected Minority Leader of the Maine Senate.
