= Francis H. Friend =

American politician

Francis Howard Friend

Member of the Maine House of Representatives
- In office 1928–1934

Member of the Maine Senate
- In office 1934–1944

Personal details
- Born: February 17, 1898
- Died: November 24, 1958 (aged 60)
- Resting place: Southside Cemetery
- Party: Republican

Francis Howard Friend (February 17, 1898 - November 24, 1958) was an American politician from Maine. Friend served in the Maine House of Representatives (1920-1934) and Maine Senate (1935-1944). A Republican, Friend represented part of Somerset County, Maine, including his residence in Skowhegan. From 1940 to 1942, Friend served as Senate Majority Leader and was President of the special session called in 1942. He died in 1958 and is buried at Southside Cemetery in Skowhegan.
