= Milbridge, Maine =

Town in Maine, United States

- Town
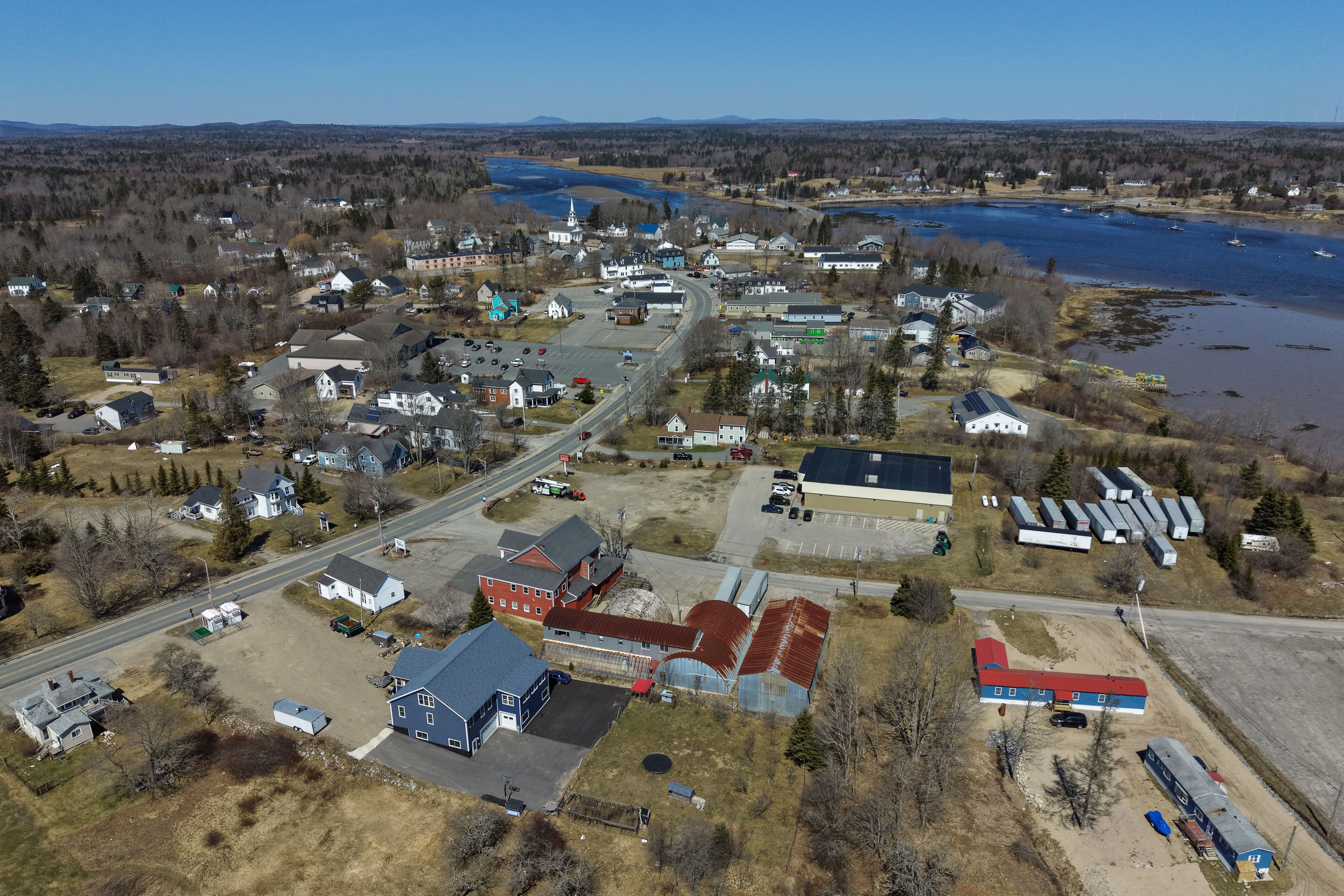
- Aerial view

- Location within Maine Location within the United States
- Coordinates: 44°31′36″N 67°52′16″W
- Country: United States
- State: Maine
- County: Washington
- Incorporated (town): 1848
- Villages: Milbridge; Wyman

Area
  - Total: 72.97 sq mi (188.99 km^{2})
  - Land: 24.25 sq mi (62.81 km^{2})
  - Water: 48.72 sq mi (126.18 km^{2})
- Elevation: 36 ft (11 m)

Population (2020)
  - Total: 1,375
  - Density: 57/sq mi (21.9/km^{2})
- Time zone: UTC-5 (Eastern (EST))
  - Summer (DST): UTC-4 (EDT)
- ZIP code: 04658
- Area code: 207
- FIPS code: 23-45600
- GNIS feature ID: 582594
- Website: https://www.milbridgemaine.org/

Milbridge is a town in Washington County, Maine, United States at the mouth of the Narraguagus River. The population was 1,375 at the 2020 census. The town was incorporated in 1848. It contains the villages of Milbridge and Wyman.

== Geography ==
According to the United States Census Bureau, the town has a total area of 72.97 square miles (188.99 km^{2}), of which 24.25 square miles (62.81 km^{2}) is land and 48.72 square miles (126.18 km^{2}) is water.

== Demographics ==
Historical population
| Census | Pop. | Note | %± |
|---|---|---|---|
| 1850 | 1,170 | | — |
| 1860 | 1,282 | | 9.6% |
| 1870 | 1,558 | | 21.5% |
| 1880 | 1,752 | | 12.5% |
| 1890 | 1,963 | | 12.0% |
| 1900 | 1,921 | | −2.1% |
| 1910 | 1,550 | | −19.3% |
| 1920 | 1,196 | | −22.8% |
| 1930 | 1,213 | | 1.4% |
| 1940 | 1,318 | | 8.7% |
| 1950 | 1,199 | | −9.0% |
| 1960 | 1,101 | | −8.2% |
| 1970 | 1,154 | | 4.8% |
| 1980 | 1,306 | | 13.2% |
| 1990 | 1,305 | | −0.1% |
| 2000 | 1,279 | | −2.0% |
| 2010 | 1,353 | | 5.8% |
| 2020 | 1,375 | | 1.6% |
U.S. Decennial Census

As of 2020, the median income for a household in the town was $44,545.

=== 2010 census ===
As of the census of 2010, there were 1,353 people, 612 households, and 345 families residing in the town. The population density was 55.8 inhabitants per square mile (21.5/km^{2}). There were 1,009 housing units at an average density of 41.6 per square mile (16.1/km^{2}). The racial makeup of the town was 95.1% White, 0.2% African American, 0.8% Native American, 0.1% Asian, 2.8% from other races, and 0.9% from two or more races. Hispanic or Latino of any race were 6.2% of the population.

There were 612 households, of which 23.2% had children under the age of 18 living with them, 45.4% were married couples living together, 7.4% had a female householder with no husband present, 3.6% had a male householder with no wife present, and 43.6% were non-families. 37.1% of all households were made up of individuals, and 20.7% had someone living alone who was 65 years of age or older. The average household size was 2.16 and the average family size was 2.79.

The median age in the town was 47.3 years. 19.1% of residents were under the age of 18; 6.8% were between the ages of 18 and 24; 21% were from 25 to 44; 29.3% were from 45 to 64; and 23.8% were 63 years of age or older. The gender makeup of the town was 48.2% male and 51.8% female.

== Economy ==
The economy consists of people involved in agriculture, commercial fishing, retail and tourism.

Two of Milbridge's largest employers are Wyman's and Kelco.

== Notable people ==
- Katie Aselton, director and actress (The Puffy Chair filmed in Milbridge)—from Milbridge
- Gene Carter, federal judge—born in Milbridge
- Theodore Enslin (1925–2011), poet—resident of Milbridge
- Sue Hubbell, author—resident of Milbridge
- David J. Kennedy (1907–1995), Speaker of the Maine House of Representatives—native of Milbridge
