= Augusta School Department =

School district in Maine, United States

Augusta School Department (ASD) is the department of the city of Augusta, Maine that operates public schools.

It functions as the public school district for Augusta, and its boundaries are that of the city's.

== History ==
Cornelia Brown, previously superintendent, left her position on January 1, 2013. Jim Anastasio became the interim superintendent, then became permanent superintendent circa 2015. Prior to his becoming interim superintendent, he was the principal of Cony High School. In 2023 he resigned, with the resignation effective on June 30, 2024. Mike Tracy Jr. replaced him as superintendent.

In 2023 the student count was 2,100.

== Schools ==
Farrington, Gilbert, Hussey, and Lincoln are the four public elementary schools that are located in the city.

Cony Middle and High School serves students in grades 7–12 from Augusta and the surrounding towns. Buker Middle School closed in 2003. Hodgkins Middle School closed in 2009 with middle school students moving to Cony.
