= Robert Haskell =

American politician

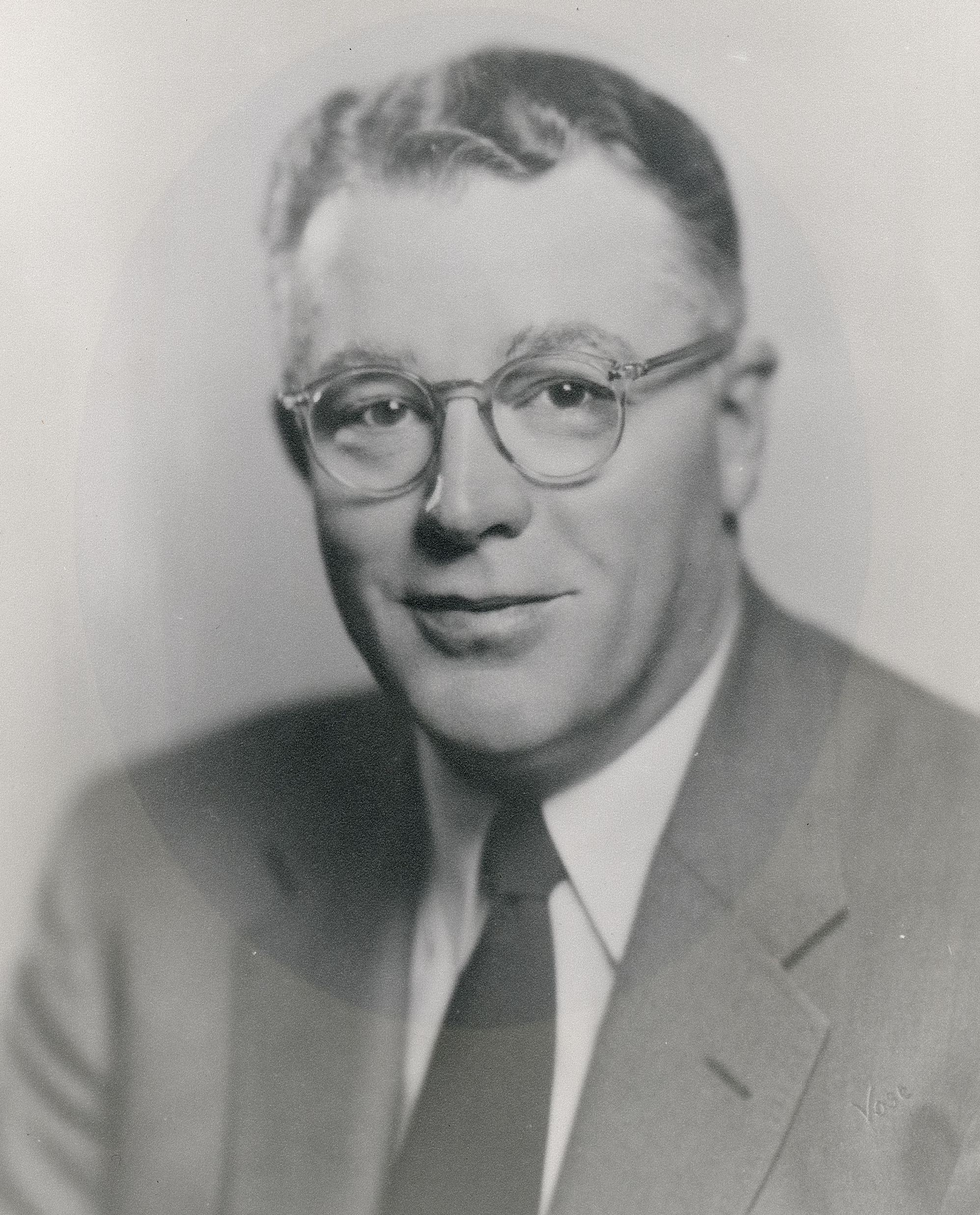

65th Governor of Maine
- In office January 2, 1959 – January 7, 1959
- Preceded by: Edmund Muskie
- Succeeded by: Clinton Clauson

95th President of the Maine Senate
- In office January 5, 1955 – January 2, 1959
- Preceded by: John F. Ward
- Succeeded by: John H. Reed

Member of the Maine Senate
- In office January 1, 1947 – January 2, 1959
- Preceded by: John E. Townsend
- Succeeded by: Roswell P. Bates
- Constituency: Penobscot County

Member of the Maine House of Representatives from Bangor
- In office January 3, 1945 – January 1, 1947

Personal details
- Born: Robert Nance Haskell; August 24, 1903 Bangor, Maine, U.S.
- Died: December 3, 1987 (aged 84) Bangor, Maine, U.S.
- Party: Republican
- Profession: Businessman, University Trustee

Robert Nance Haskell (August 24, 1903 – December 3, 1987) was a Maine state senator and the 65th governor of Maine for five days in 1959.

Haskell graduated from the University of Maine with an engineering degree in 1925. He became a design engineer with the Bangor Hydro-Electric Company and rose to president of the company in 1958. He was elected as a Republican to the Maine House of Representatives in 1945. After serving one term, he was elected to the Maine Senate in 1947 and served five terms, including two as majority leader and two as president of the Senate. He was nicknamed "Slide Rule Bob" for his mathematical abilities.

On January 2, 1959, outgoing Governor Edmund Muskie resigned before the end of his term to take his seat in the United States Senate. Haskell was sworn in as Governor to fill the five-day period until the inauguration of Clinton Clauson. With Clauson's death later in the year, Haskell was the second of four governors Maine had in 1959.

Haskell then left politics, but continued to lead the Bangor Hydro-Electric Company, as well as serving as a bank board chairman and a trustee of the University of Maine. He died in 1987.

He was not closely related to Nathaniel M. Haskell, who had served a brief term six years before as Maine's Governor due to being Senate President.

Political offices
Preceded by Edmund Muskie	Governor of Maine; 1959	Succeeded by Clinton Clauson
