= Old Cony High School =

- Cony Flatiron
- U.S. National Register of Historic Places
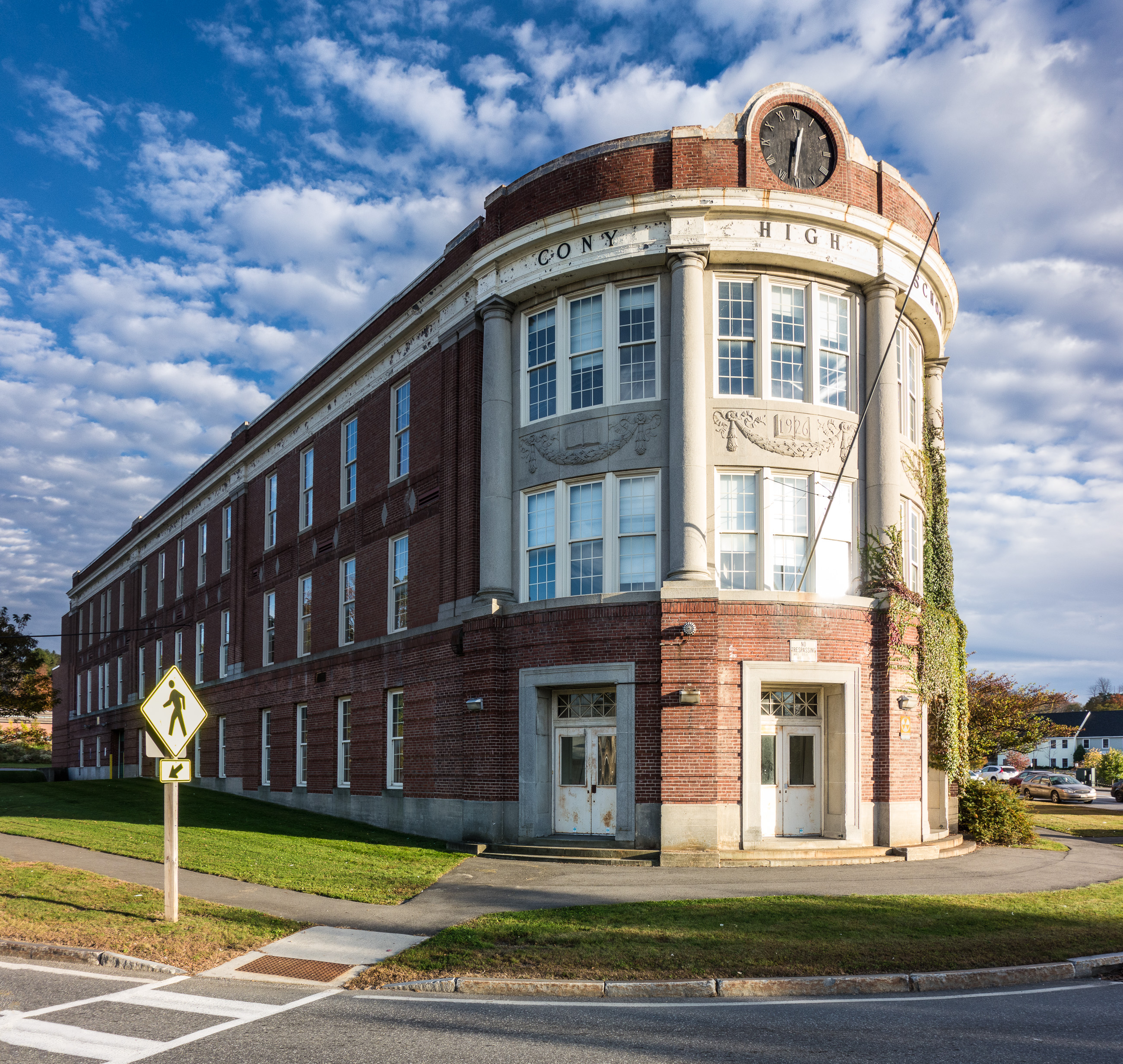
- Cony Flatiron in 2013

- Location within Maine Location within the United States
- Location: Cony Circle at Cony and Stone Sts. Augusta, Maine
- Coordinates: 44°18′58″N 69°46′3″W
- Built: 1926, 1932; renovated 2014-2015
- Architect: Bunker & Savage
- Architectural style: Colonial Revival
- Website: http://conyflatironapartments.com/
- NRHP reference No.: 88001841
- Added to NRHP: September 29, 1988

Cony Flatiron is a historic school building at Cony and Stone Streets in Augusta, Maine. Built between 1926 and 1932 and the high school building, along with the catwalk was demolished in 2008, it is locally unusual for its flatiron shape, and its social history as the city's third high school building. It was listed on the National Register of Historic Places in 1988.

== Design ==
Built between 1926 and 1932, the old Cony High School is a three-story wedge-shaped (or flatiron-shaped) building with Colonial Revival detailing. The curved entrance facade faces northwest, with Tuscan columns on a granite foundation. The unusual Colonial Revival style brick building was designed by local firm Bunker & Savage.

== History ==
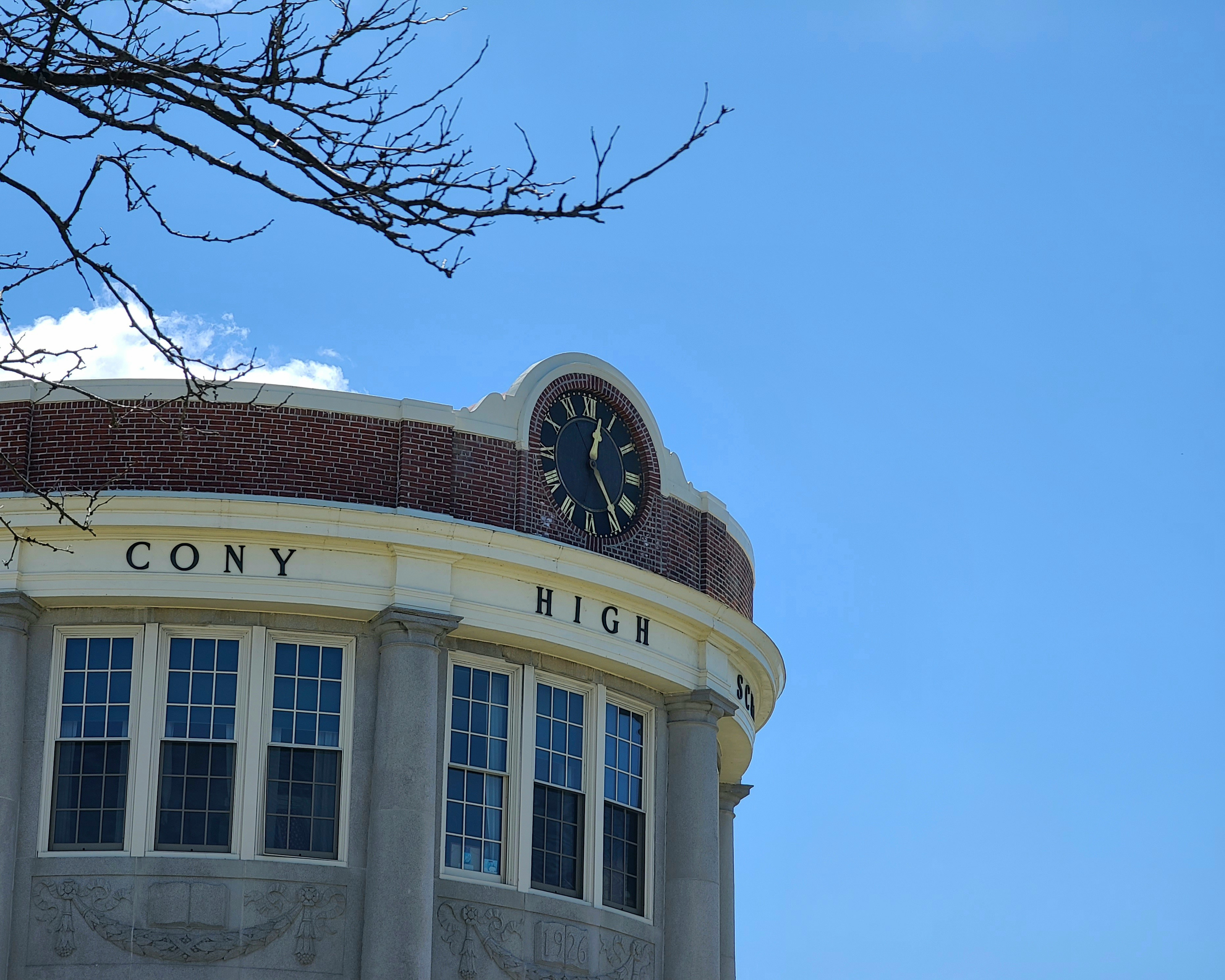
Closeup of the facade near the clock post 2014-2015 renovation

In the 1920s, it was realized that the existing Cony Free High School was unable to accommodate plans for future enrollment. Construction was started on the Old Cony High School in 1926. The building was dedicated on November 12, 1930, but the third story was not finished until 1932.

The building was used as a school until 2006. At that time, a new school was built, and the city of Augusta maintained the empty old building as a heated storage facility at a cost of $75,000 per year.

In 2013, the group Housing Initiatives of New England stepped forward to renovate the school into a living center for senior adults. With a tax credit from the Maine State Housing Authority, plus several grants, the project went forward to renovate the interior and exterior of the building, while preserving historic features. The staircase, corridors, and original entrances will be preserved. The windows will be replaced with new windows designed to match the original. The historic Daniel Cony clock will remain in the building.

The building remains property of the City of Augusta, but the group Housing Initiatives of New England retains a long-term, 49-year lease for a fee of $1/year.

In July 2015, the renovated building was opened as Cony Flatiron Senior Residence, a senior housing complex. Some of the residents were formerly students at the high school.

== See also ==
- National Register of Historic Places listings in Kennebec County, Maine
