= James Erwin (politician) =

American politician and attorney

Attorney General of Maine
- In office 1967–1971
- Governor: Kenneth M. Curtis
- Preceded by: Richard Dubord
- Succeeded by: Jon Lund

Personal details
- Born: November 27, 1920 New York City, U.S.
- Died: July 14, 2005 (aged 84) York, Maine, U.S.

James Erwin (November 27, 1920 – July 14, 2005) was an American politician and attorney from Maine. According to his 2005 obituary, Erwin was "born in New York City and grew up in Englewood, N.J. He spent his summers on his mother's family's farm in South Berwick, which is now the site of Berwick Academy. He graduated from Dartmouth College and served in the Army during World War II. He served as Maine Attorney General from 1967 to 1971 and was thrice a candidate for Governor of Maine as a Republican – he was the nominee in the 1970 and 1974 elections, and was defeated in the Republican primary in 1966.

Party political offices
Preceded by John H. Reed	Republican nominee for Governor of Maine; 1970, 1974	Succeeded by Linwood E. Palmer Jr.
Political offices
Preceded by Richard Dubord	Maine Attorney General; 1967 – 1971	Succeeded by Jon Lund
