= 1960 Maine gubernatorial special election =

- November 8, 1960
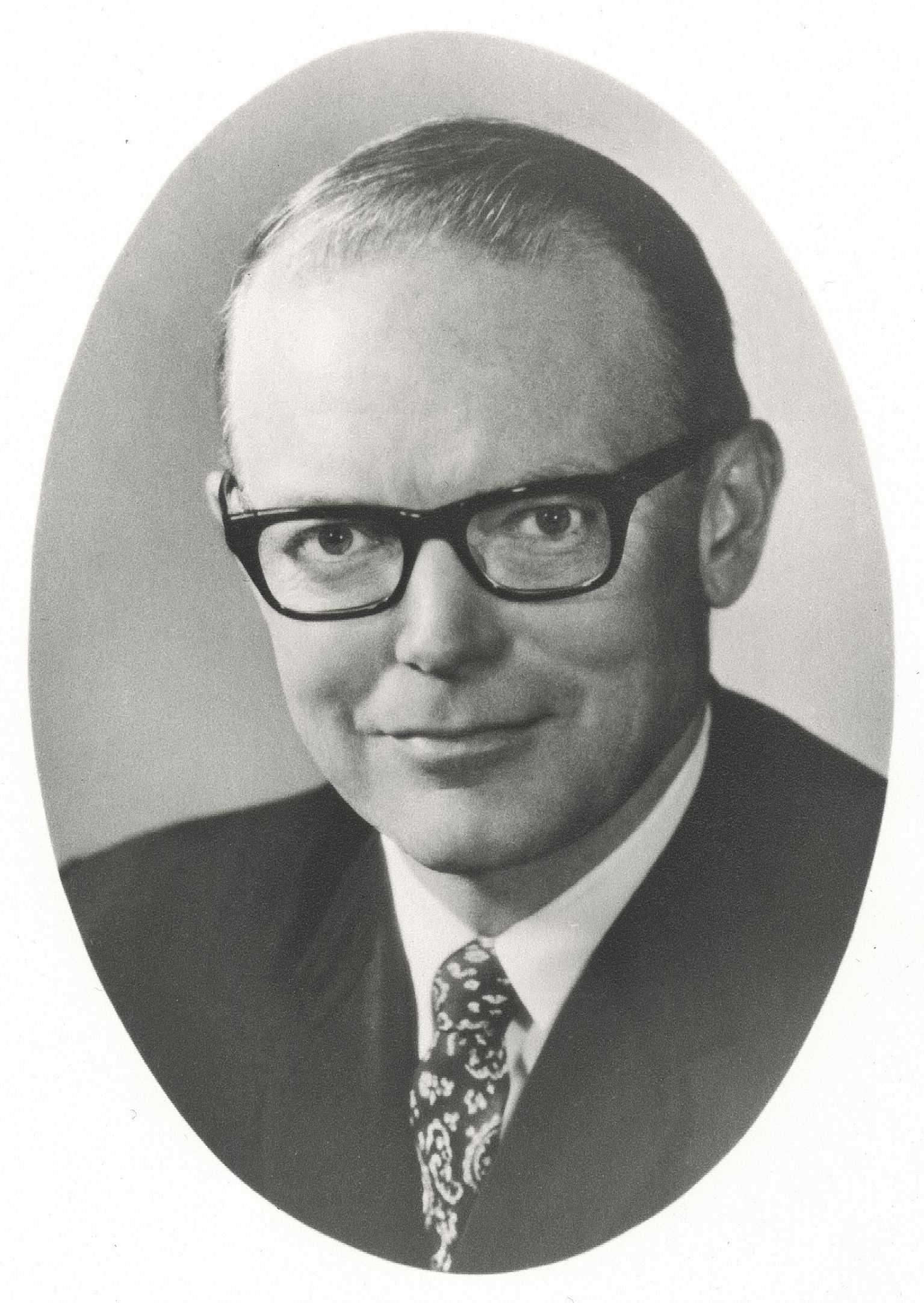

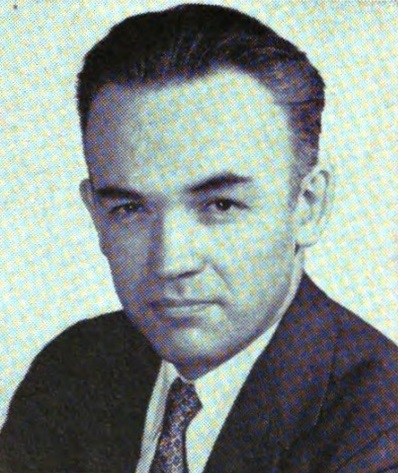
Nominee	John H. Reed	Frank M. Coffin
Party	Republican	Democratic
Popular vote	219,768	197,447
Percentage	52.67%	47.33%
- Reed: 50–60% 60–70% 70–80% 80–90% >90% Coffin: 50–60% 60–70% 70–80% 80–90% >90% Tie: 50%
Governor before election
John H. Reed
Republican
Elected Governor
John H. Reed
Republican

The 1960 Maine gubernatorial special election was a special election held to officially elect a governor of Maine following the death of Democratic Governor Clinton Clauson. It took place on November 8, 1960, concurrently with the presidential election, a U.S. Senate election, U.S. House of Representatives elections, and other state and local elections.

The election saw incumbent Republican governor John Reed (who, as President of the Maine Senate, automatically took office as acting governor upon Clauson's death) defeating Democrat Frank M. Coffin, United States representative from the second district. To date, this is the only gubernatorial special election ever held in Maine, as each succeeding governor has served their entire term.

Both Reed and Coffin were unopposed in their respective party primaries.

The election was also the first time since Maine was admitted to the Union that the state did not hold its election in September. Traditionally, Maine had held its elections two months before the rest of the nation, which helped give birth to the phrase "As Maine goes, so goes the nation" and its status as a bellwether state. However, following a 1957 referendum, the state constitution was amended to hold all elections after 1958 in November and shift from two-year to four-year gubernatorial terms.

== Results ==
1960 Gubernatorial special election, Maine
Party	Candidate	Votes	%	±%
Republican	John H. Reed (incumbent)	219,768	52.67%	−
Democratic	Frank M. Coffin	197,447	47.33%	−
Majority		22,321	5.35%	

=== Counties that flipped from Democratic to Republican ===
- Cumberland (largest city: Portland)
- Oxford (largest town: Rumford)
- Sagadahoc (largest town: Bath)
- Somerset (largest town: Skowhegan)
