= Clinton Clauson =

American politician and chiropractor (1895–1959)

Clinton Amos Clauson
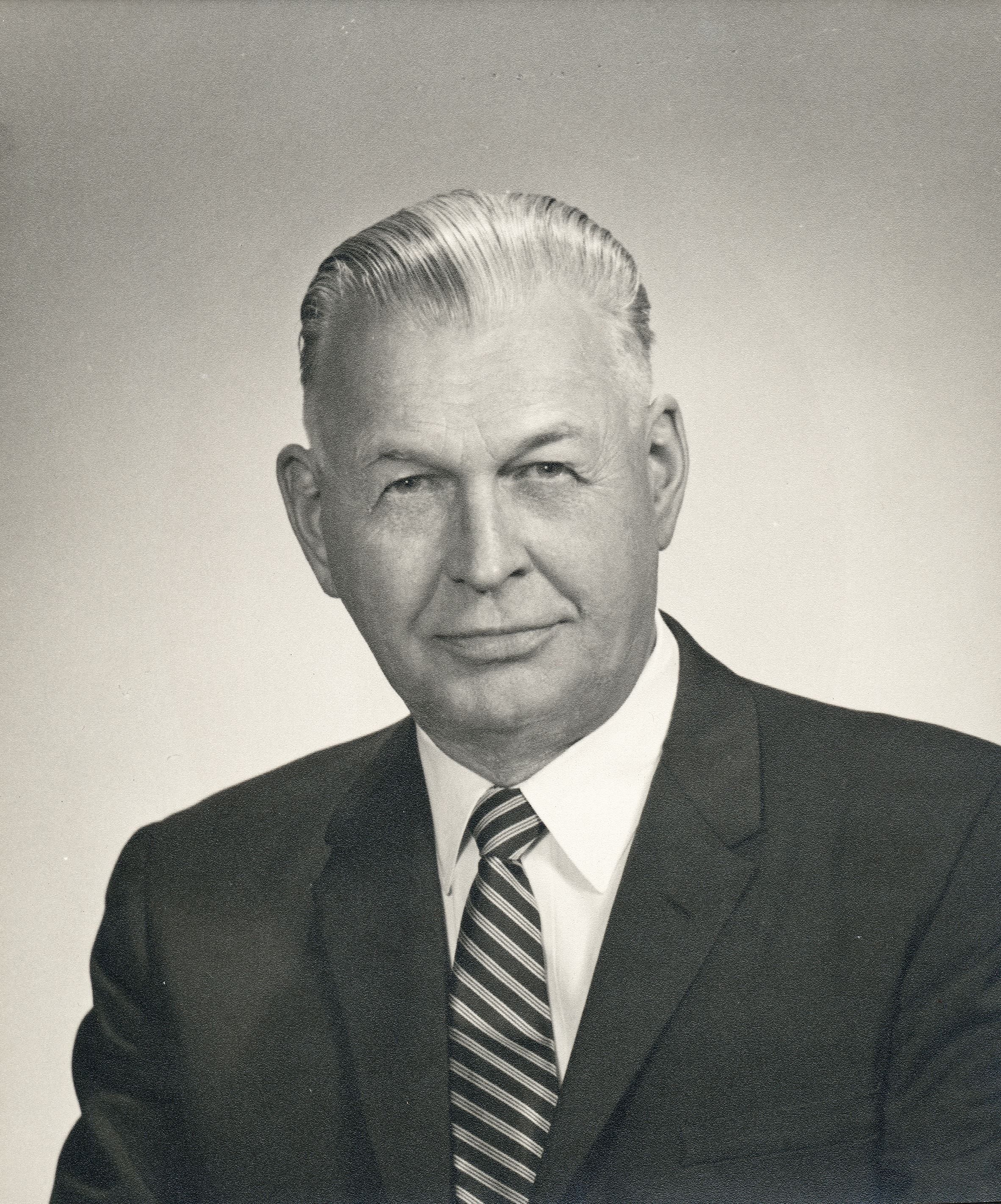

66th Governor of Maine
- In office January 6, 1959 – December 30, 1959
- Preceded by: Robert Haskell
- Succeeded by: John H. Reed

35th Mayor of Waterville
- In office January 3, 1956 – December 2, 1957
- Preceded by: Richard J. Dubord
- Succeeded by: Albert Bernier

Collector of Internal Revenue for the District of Maine
- In office 1934–1953

City Treasurer of Waterville
- In office 1930–1931

Personal details
- Born: March 28, 1895 Mitchell, Iowa, U.S.
- Died: December 30, 1959 (aged 64) Augusta, Maine, U.S.
- Party: Democratic
- Spouse: Ellen Kelleher (m. 1920)
- Profession: Chiropractor

Clinton Amos Clauson (March 28, 1895 – December 30, 1959) was an American politician who served as the 66th governor of Maine from January 1959 until his death in December of that year. A Democrat, Clauson previously held office in Waterville, Maine, where he practiced chiropractic, including serving as the 35th mayor of Waterville from 1956 to 1957.

== Early life and education ==
Clinton Amos Clauson was born in Mitchell, Iowa, on March 28, 1895, the son of Mr. and Mrs. Albert Clauson. After serving in World War I, he became a member of many organizations including Freemasonry, the Independent Order of Odd Fellows, and the Newcomen Society of the United States. In 1919 he graduated from the Palmer College of Chiropractic and later set up a practice in Waterville, Maine. On December 25, 1920, Clauson married Ellen Julia Kelleher at the Sacred Heart church rectory in Lewiston.

== Career ==
Clauson entered politics in 1928 as a member of the Democratic State Committee, a position he held until 1935. He subsequently served as the city treasurer of Waterville from 1930 to 1931, the collector of Internal Revenue for the District of Maine from 1934 to 1953, the state administrator of the Maine War Bond Program from 1941 to 1943, and served as a member on several boards and committees. On December 5, 1955, he was elected as the mayor of Waterville, and was sworn in at 7:30 p.m. on January 3, 1956. He succeeded Richard J. Dubord, who decided not to run for re-election. In his inaugural address, Clauson cited finding jobs for unemployed Waterville citizens and more careful spending. Deciding not to run for re-election, he was succeeded by Democrat Albert Bernier, who was elected and took office on December 2, 1957.

As a politician, he was deemed to be a conservative Democrat. His 1958 gubernatorial election victory surprised many in Maine, as incumbent Governor Edmund Muskie's preferred candidate, the more liberal Maynard Dolloff, had been expected to win the Democratic primary, and the Republican candidate was the better-known Horace A. Hildreth. In an obituary, Clauson's career had been termed "unorthodox," due to his background as someone who was not a native Mainer, his relative conservatism compared to other Maine Democrats, and his upset victory over Hildreth at a time when Republicans were dominant in Maine.

Some accomplishments during his brief term included expanding Maine's sales tax to fund the formation of consolidated school districts, instituting a 3% lodging tax for school funding, the first open meetings law in Maine, and expanding the powers of judges in state municipal courts, which led to the formation of the District Court system two years after his death.

== Death ==
Clauson died in his sleep on December 30, 1959, before he could finish out his term, although no cause of death was given. He is buried in Waterville's Pine Grove Cemetery. Clauson was succeeded by the President of the Maine Senate, John H. Reed. Reed, a Republican, was subsequently elected governor after a special election.

In 1961, the Maine Legislature voted to name two bridges over the Kennebec River in Fairfield on the then-under construction Interstate 95 the Clinton A. Clauson Memorial Bridges. The bridges were completed in 1964 and rehabilitated from 2013 to 2014.

Party political offices
Preceded by Edmund Muskie	Democratic nominee for Governor of Maine; 1958	Succeeded by Frank M. Coffin
Political offices
Preceded by Robert Haskell	Governor of Maine; 1959	Succeeded by John H. Reed
