= Electoral history of Edmund Muskie =

List of elections featuring Edmund Muskie as a candidate

Offices pursued–successfully and unsuccessfully–by Edmund Muskie, the 58th United States Secretary of State, United States Senator from Maine, 64th Governor of Maine, and Member of the Maine House of Representatives from the 110th district.

== 1954 Maine Governor ==
1954 Gubernatorial Election, Maine
Party	Candidate	Votes	%	±%
Democratic	Edmund Muskie	135,673	54.49%	−
Republican	Burton M. Cross (Incumbent)	113,298	45.51%	−
Majority		22,375	8.99%	

== 1956 Maine Governor ==
1956 Gubernatorial Election, Maine
Party	Candidate	Votes	%	±%
Democratic	Edmund Muskie (Incumbent)	180,254	59.17%	−
Republican	Willis A. Trafton, Jr.	124,395	40.83%	−
Majority		55,859	18.34%	

== 1958 United States Senate ==
- Edmund Muskie 60.8%
- Frederick G. Payne (inc.) 39.2%

== 1964 United States Senate ==
- Edmund Muskie (D) (inc.) 66%
- Clifford G. McIntire (R) 33%

== 1968 United States Vice President ==
- Spiro Agnew (R) 301, 43.42%
- Edmund Muskie (D) 191, 42.72%
- Curtis LeMay (American Independent Party) 46, 13.53%

== 1970 United States Senate ==
- Edmund Muskie (D) (inc.) 61.9%
- Neil S. Bishop (R) 38.3%

== 1972 United States President ==
=== Democratic convention: Presidential votes ===
- George McGovern 1864.95 delegates
- Henry M. Jackson 525
- George Wallace 381.7
- Shirley Chisholm 151.95
- Terry Sanford 77.5
- Hubert Humphrey 66.7
- Wilbur Mills 33.8
- Edmund Muskie 24.3
- Edward M. Kennedy 12.7
- Sam Yorty 10
- Wayne Hays 5
- John Lindsay 5
- Fred Harris 2
- Eugene McCarthy 2
- Walter Mondale 2
- Ramsey Clark, Walter Fauntroy, Vance Hartke, Harold Hughes and Patsy Mink 1 each

=== Democratic convention: Vice Presidential votes ===
- Thomas F. Eagleton 1741.81
- Frances Farenthold 404.04
- Mike Gravel 225.38
- Endicott Peabody 107.26
- Claiborne W. Smothers 74
- Birch Bayh 62
- Peter Rodino 56.5
- Jimmy Carter 30
- Shirley Chisholm 20
- Moon Landrieu 18.5
- Edward T. Breathitt 18
- Edward M. Kennedy 15
- Fred Harris 14
- Richard G. Hatcher 11
- Harold E. Hughes 10
- Joseph M. Montoya 9
- William L. Guy 8
- Adlai E. Stevenson III 8
- Three others: 5 votes each
- Five others: 4 votes each
- Five others: 3 votes each
- Edmund Muskie 2 votes
- Eight others: 2 votes each
- Thirty-seven others: 1 vote each
- Four others: shared 88.49 votes

== 1976 United States Senate ==
- Edmund Muskie (D) (inc.) 60.8%
- Robert A. G. Monks (R) 38.2%
