= Joanne Twomey =

American politician

Mayor of Biddeford, Maine
- In office 2007–2011
- Preceded by: Wallace H. Nutting
- Succeeded by: Alan Casavant

Member of the Maine House of Representatives from the 135th district
- In office December 1, 2004 – December 6, 2006
- Preceded by: Anne C. Perry
- Succeeded by: Paulette Beaudoin

Member of the Maine House of Representatives from the 19th district
- In office December 2, 1998 – December 1, 2004
- Preceded by: Lucien A. Dutremble
- Succeeded by: Emily Cain

Personal details
- Party: Democrat

Joanne T. Twomey is a Maine politician. Twomey, a Democrat, represented part of Biddeford (District 135) from 1998 to 2006. She served on the agriculture, conservation and forestry; natural resources; engrossed bills committees, including a stint as chair of the engrossed bills. Twomey was elected Mayor of Biddeford in 2006 and was re-elected in 2008 and 2010. In November 2011, Twomey was defeated for re-election by State Representative Alan Casavant.

On April 2, 2015, Twomey was ejected from a public meeting in Saco after she tossed a jar of Vaseline onstage after heated comments regarding Maine's budget. This was in response to LePage's previous comments in 2013 that "Democratic state Sen. Troy Jackson claims to be for the people, but he's the first one to give it to the people without providing Vaseline."

On April 20, 2026, Twomey interrupted a campaign event for U.S. Senate candidate Graham Platner, when she attempted to hand him cash in the midst of his speech after he asked the audience for donations. Twomey also said that "she will also donate the $300 relief check she will receive from [Platner's primary opponent] Gov. Janet Mills to Platner’s campaign."

== See also ==
- List of mayors of Biddeford, Maine
