= Charles M. Moses =

American paymaster and politician

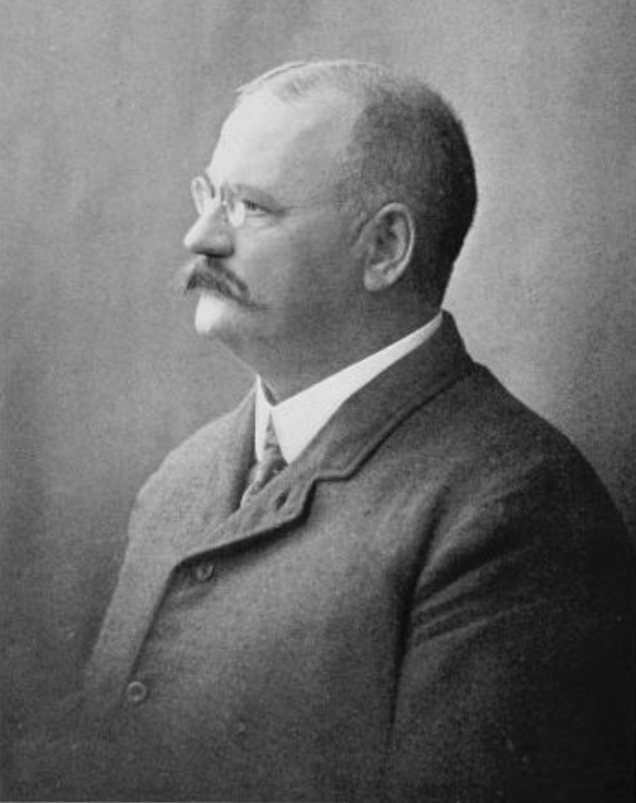

Mayor of Biddeford, Maine
- In office 1878, 1880

Personal details
- Born: August 25, 1851; Limerick, Maine
- Died: October 2, 1912 (aged 61); Biddeford, Maine
- Occupation: Paymaster, politician
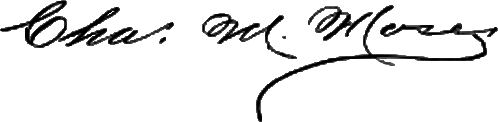
- Signature

Charles Malcolm Moses (August 25, 1851 – October 2, 1912) was an American paymaster and politician from Biddeford, Maine.

== Biography ==
Born in either Augusta, Maine, or Limerick, Maine, he was the paymaster of the Saco Water Power Company for approximately 25 years. He moved to Biddeford with his family as a child, where he attended public schools. He graduated from Biddeford High School.

He served as mayor of Biddeford in 1878 and 1880.

In 1898, he was appointed appraiser of the Port of Portland and a year later, in 1899, he was appointed to the lucrative position of Collector of the Port of Portland by Republican president William McKinley. His appointment was deemed "not satisfactory" by the Portland Evening Express newspaper, as it desired a Portland resident for the position. He was renominated in December 1903.

He died in Biddeford on October 2, 1912.

== See also ==
- List of mayors of Biddeford, Maine
