= George D. Varney Sr. =

American politician

Member of the Maine House of Representatives
- In office 1930–1932

Member of the Maine House of Representatives
- In office 1936–1942

Member of the Maine Senate
- In office 1942–1948

Personal details
- Born: June 28, 1903
- Died: September 7, 1982 (aged 79)
- Party: Republican

George D. Varney Sr. (June 28, 1903 – September 7, 1982) was an American politician from Maine. Varney, a Republican, served in the Maine Legislature from 1930 to 1932 and again from 1936 to 1948. Varney served in the Maine House of Representatives from 1930 to 1932 and from 1936 to 1942. During his final term, Varney served as Speaker of the Maine House of Representatives. He was elected to represent York County, Maine, including his residence in Kittery, Maine, in the Maine Senate from 1942 to 1948. He served as Senate President from 1945 to 1948. He was an unsuccessful candidate for Governor of Maine in 1948, losing the Republican primary to Frederick G. Payne.
