= Paulette Beaudoin =

American politician

Member of the Maine House of Representatives for the 135th District
- In office December 2006 – December 2014

Personal details
- Born: July 25, 1933 Biddeford, Maine
- Died: January 13, 2017 (aged 83) Scarborough, Maine
- Party: Democrat
- Spouse: Roger O. Beaudoin
- Education: St. Joseph's High School (Biddeford, ME)

Paulette G. Beaudoin (July 25, 1933 – January 13, 2017) was an American politician from Maine. A Democrat, Beaudoin was first elected to the Maine House of Representatives in 2006. She represented District 135, which includes a portion of Biddeford. She was re-elected in 2008, 2010 and 2012 and was unable to seek re-election in 2014 due to term limits. Among her political positions, She was known as a proponent of mandating helmets for motorcyclists. She unsuccessfully entered a bill to do so in 2009 and has entered another such bill in 2013.

== Personal ==
Beaudoin was born in 1933 in Biddeford, Maine to Joseph U. and Emilienne (Valliere) Bouchard. She graduated from St. Joseph's High School in 1951. She married Roger O. Beaudoin in Biddeford's St. Joseph Church on April 15, 1955.
