= Hockey East Best Defensive Defenseman =

Annual ice hockey award

- Sport: Ice hockey
- Awarded for: To the best defensive defenseman in the conference.

History
- First award: 1999
- Most recent: Eamon Powell

The Hockey East Best Defensive Defenseman is an annual award given out at the conclusion of the Hockey East regular season to the best defensive defenseman in the conference as voted by the head coaches of each Hockey East team.

The Best Defensive Defenseman was first bestowed in 1999 and every year thereafter.

Brian Dumoulin is the only defenseman to have won the award more than once, doing so in 2010–11 and 2011–12. The award has been shared once, in 2003–04 between Andrew Alberts of Boston College and Prestin Ryan of Maine.

== Award winners ==
Year	Winner	School	Ref
1998–99	Steve O'Brien	New Hampshire	
1999–00	Mike Mottau	Boston College	
2000–01	Bobby Allen	Boston College	
2001–02	Chris Dyment	Boston University	
2002–03	Cliff Loya	Maine	
2003–04	Andrew Alberts	Boston College	
2003–04	Prestin Ryan	Maine	
2004–05	Tim Judy	Northeastern	
2005–06	Peter Harrold	Boston College	
2006–07	Sean Sullivan	Boston University	
2007–08	Joe Charlebois	New Hampshire	
2008–09	Louis Liotti	Northeastern	
2009–10	Justin Braun	Massachusetts	
2010–11	Brian Dumoulin	Boston College	

Year	Winner	School	Ref
2011–12	Brian Dumoulin	Boston College	
2012–13	Patrick Wey	Boston College	
2013–14	Josh Manson	Northeastern	
2014–15	Mike Paliotta	Vermont	
2015–16	Steve Santini	Boston College	
2016–17	Dennis Gilbert	Notre Dame	
2017–18	Casey Fitzgerald	Boston College	
2018–19	Vincent Desharnais	Providence	
2019–20	Wyatt Newpower	Connecticut	
2020–21	Drew Helleson	Boston College	
2021–22	Jordan Harris	Northeastern	
2022–23	Hunter McDonald	Northeastern	
2023–24	Cade Webber	Boston University	
2024–25	Eamon Powell	Boston College	

=== Winners by school ===
School	Winners
Boston College	11
Northeastern	5
Boston University	3
Maine	2
New Hampshire	2
Connecticut	1
Massachusetts	1
Notre Dame	1
Providence	1
Vermont	1

== See also ==
- Hockey East Awards
