= Brian Dumoulin =

American ice hockey player (born 1991)

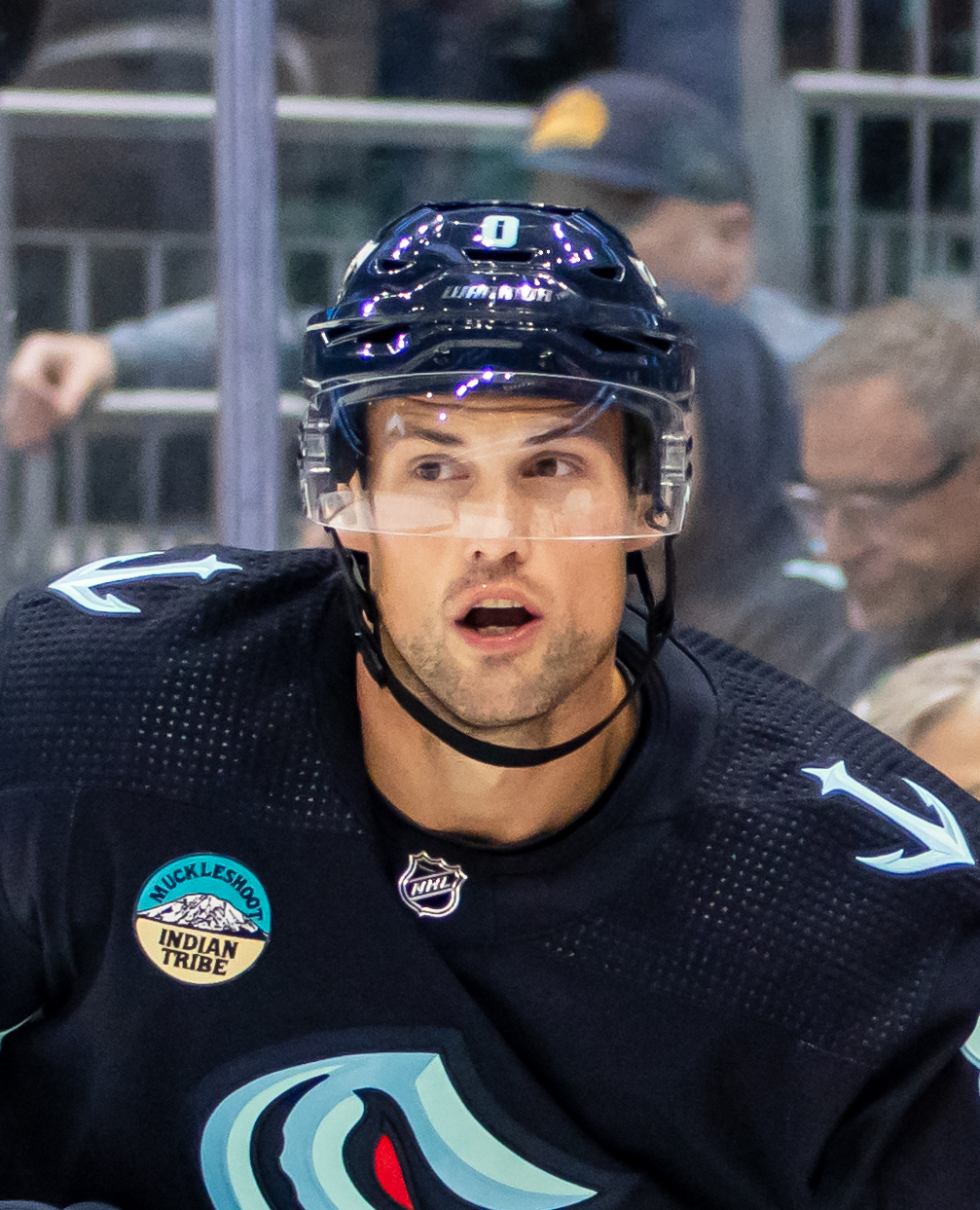
- Dumoulin with the Seattle Kraken in 2023
- Born: September 6, 1991 (age 35) Biddeford, Maine, U.S.
- Height: 6 ft 4 in (193 cm)
- Weight: 207 lb (94 kg; 14 st 11 lb)
- Position: Defense
- Shoots: Left
- NHL team Former teams: Los Angeles Kings; Pittsburgh Penguins; Seattle Kraken; Anaheim Ducks; New Jersey Devils
- NHL draft: 51st overall, 2009; Carolina Hurricanes
- Playing career: 2012–present

Brian Joseph Dumoulin (born September 6, 1991) is an American professional ice hockey player who is a defenseman for the Los Angeles Kings of the National Hockey League (NHL). Dumoulin was selected by the Carolina Hurricanes in the second round (51st overall) of the 2009 NHL entry draft, and previously played for the Pittsburgh Penguins, Seattle Kraken, Anaheim Ducks and New Jersey Devils.

Growing up in Maine, Dumoulin played hockey for the Biddeford High School Tigers where he helped them win back-to-back state championships. Following this, he played one season with the New Hampshire Junior Monarchs before starting his freshman season at Boston College. Throughout his three seasons at Boston College, Dumoulin accumulated numerous honors and awards including the Hockey East Best Defensive Defenseman, All-Hockey East First Team, and Rookie Team. During his time at Boston College, Dumoulin's playing rights were traded to the Penguins.

As an American citizen, Dumoulin has represented the United States men's national junior ice hockey team at the junior level in international tournaments. His first international tournament was at the 2008 Ivan Hlinka Memorial Tournament where Team USA placed seventh. In his second tournament at the international level, Dumoulin helped lead Team USA to a bronze medal at the 2011 World Junior Ice Hockey Championships.

== Early life ==
Dumoulin was born on September 6, 1991, in Biddeford, Maine, to parents Deb and Pete Dumoulin. After his mother roller skated while attending a nursing conference in California, she taught her two sons the sport upon returning to Maine. They began playing hockey in the driveway before being enrolled into the learn-to-skate program at the Biddeford Ice Arena. From there, Dumoulin played Atoms hockey before being forced to take a year off due to the birth of his little sister. He returned to Atoms at age seven and then joined the select travel team Maine Renegades. After spending a few years with the Renegades, Dumoulin returned to Biddeford intending to play on a hockey team with his friends. However, he was unable to qualify for the top tier Biddeford youth hockey team and as such, played pee wee and bantam in New Hampshire with the Seacoast Spartans. While playing in New Hampshire, Dumoulin skated alongside future NHL players Casey DeSmith and Garnet Hathaway. While growing up in Maine, Dumoulin's first job was washing dishes at a local restaurant called Huot's Seafood.

== Playing career ==
=== Amateur ===
Upon entering high school age, Dumoulin played hockey for the Biddeford High School (BHS) Tigers where he helped them win back-to-back state championships. During that time frame, he accumulated 107 points through 48 games. As a result of his successful play, he left BHS as a junior to play for the New Hampshire Junior Monarchs, a Tier III Junior A team. Part of the reason Dumoulin left BHS was that he felt playing junior hockey instead of high school hockey would lead to a better path to Division I collegiate hockey. Although he left, his brother John remained at BHS before retiring upon graduating. As a senior during the 2008–09 season, Dumoulin helped the team capture the regular-season championship and was named the EJHL’s Defensive Player of the Year. Due to his success on the ice, Dumoulin was courted by his home state university University of Maine, Providence College, Northeastern University, Harvard University, University of New Hampshire, and Boston College (BC). He chose to attend BC due to the school itself, the types of players who were going there, and its proximity to his hometown.

=== Collegiate ===
Prior to starting his freshman season at BC, Dumoulin was drafted in the second round, 51st overall, by the Carolina Hurricanes in the 2009 NHL entry draft. He had earned a final ranking of 61st amongst all North American skaters by the NHL Central Scouting Bureau. Following the draft, Dumoulin enrolled at BC's Carroll School of Management while playing for the Boston College Eagles men's ice hockey team which competed in the NCAA's Division I in the Hockey East conference. He had originally been on school visits to Providence College, Northeastern University, Harvard University, University of New Hampshire, Boston College, and the University of Maine before being offered a scholarship to BC. While playing with the Eagles, Dumoulin was surrounded with Pittsburgh Penguins prospects Carl Sneep, Philip Samuelsson, and Brian Gibbons. He was also trained to skate in a similar fashion as the Penguins by coach Jerry York.

In his freshman year, Dumoulin recorded 12 points and led the team with a plus-40 rating. He recorded his first collegiate goal on March 6, 2010, with 3.2 seconds remaining in the second period of a 3-2 home win over New Hampshire. On March 17, 2010, prior to the conclusion of the season, Dumoulin was named to the Hockey East Rookie Team. He also helped the Eagles qualify for the 2010 NCAA Frozen Four and was selected for the All-Tournament Team following their win.

Dumoulin returned to the Eagles for the 2010–11 season for his sophomore year. He began the season strong, recording 10 points through 16 games, before being selected for Team USA at the 2011 World Junior Ice Hockey Championships. He returned from the tournament with a bronze medal and continued to produce offensively. He finished the season with three goals and 30 assists for 33 points through 37 games. Due to his on-ice success, it was speculated that Dumoulin would conclude his collegiate career and turn professional. However, he announced his choice to return to BC for the 2011–12 season in March 2011 in order to improve his overall playing ability. He finished the season earning American Hockey Coaches Association (AHCA) All-Hockey East Teams First Team honors and earned both Hockey East Best Defensive Defenseman honor and the Bob Monahan Award as the top defenseman in New England.

During the 2011 offseason, Dumoulin attended the Hurricanes Conditioning Camp. Upon returning to the Eagles for the 2011–12 season, Dumoulin tallied seven goals and 28 points through 44 games as the Eagles qualified for the 2012 NCAA Frozen Four. During the Final against Ferris State, Dumoulin tallied a goal in the first period to help lead the team to a 4–1 win. Prior to the tournament, Dumoulin was named a finalist for the 2012 Hobey Baker Award as he led all Hockey East defensemen in scoring. Following the Eagles' NCAA win, Dumoulin was again selected for the All-Tournament Team alongside teammates Johnny Gaudreau and Parker Milner.

On April 10, 2012, the Hurricanes signed Dumoulin to an entry-level contract. However, a few months later on June 22, 2012, Dumoulin was traded to the Pittsburgh Penguins, along with Brandon Sutter and the 8th overall selection (Derrick Pouliot) in the 2012 NHL entry draft, for center Jordan Staal.

=== Professional ===
==== Pittsburgh Penguins ====
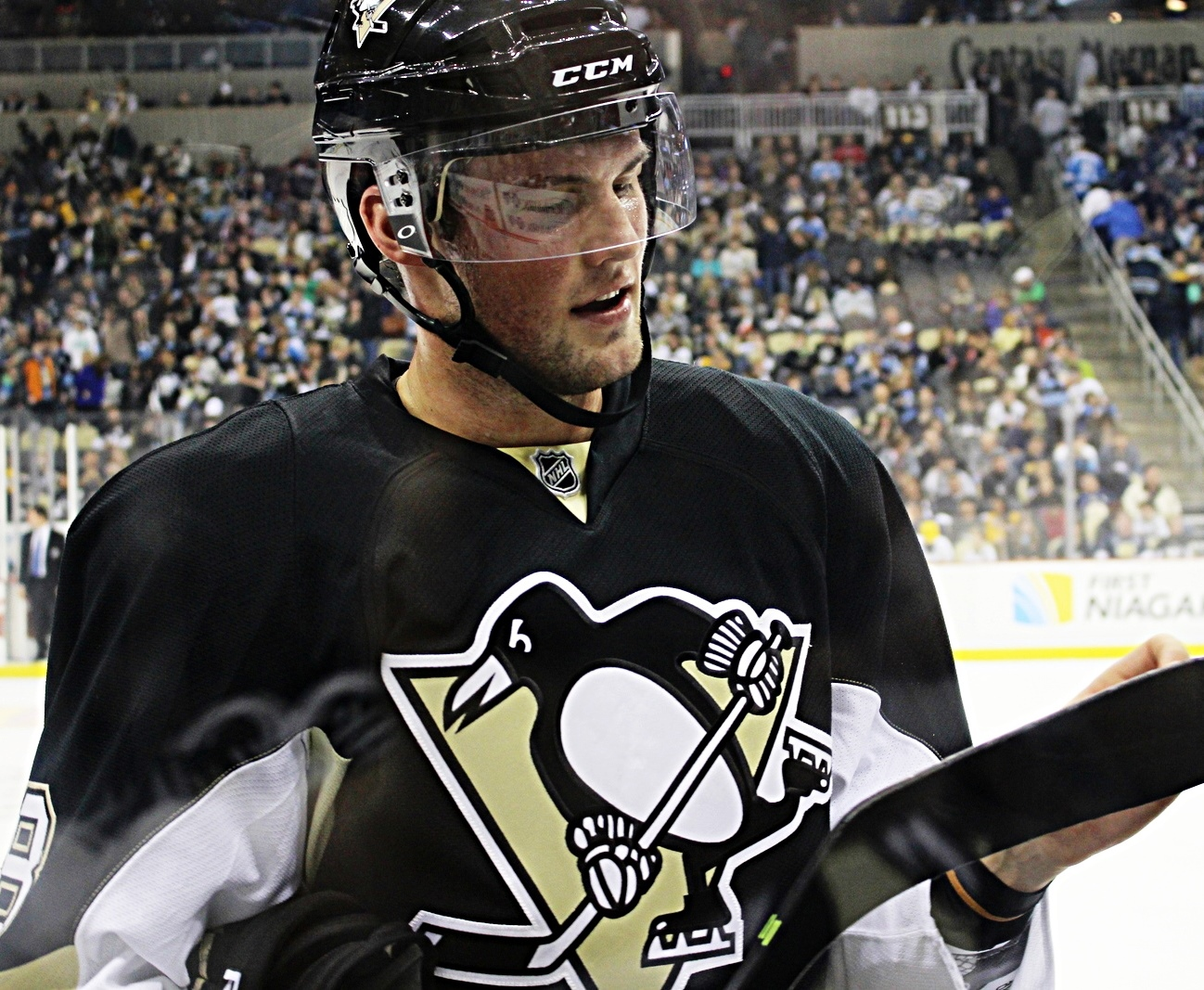
Dumoulin during a game against the Calgary Flames in 2013

Upon concluding his collegiate career, Dumoulin attended the Penguins' annual Development Camp. After attending the camp, Dumoulin was re-assigned to their American Hockey League (AHL) affiliate, the Wilkes-Barre/Scranton Penguins, to begin the 2012–13 season. In his first season with the WBS Penguins, Dumoulin tallied six goals and 18 assists for 24 points through 79 games.

The following season, Dumoulin again began with the WBS Penguins before being recalled on December 9, 2013. At the time, he had tallied six points in 22 games. He subsequently made his NHL debut in a December 14, game against the Detroit Red Wings. As a result of numerous penalties taken during the game, Dumoulin played 18:10 minutes of ice time. He scored his first NHL point, an assist on Chris Conner's goal, in a game two days later against netminder Jonathan Bernier of the Toronto Maple Leafs. He was re-assigned to the AHL after recording one assist in six games. Dumoulin rejoined the WBS Penguins for their 2014 Calder Cup playoffs run and recorded 12 points through 17 games.

After attending the Penguins training camp prior to the 2014–15 season, Dumoulin was re-assigned to the WBS Penguins. As a result of numerous injuries to the Penguins lineup, Dumoulin and Bryan Rust joined the teams' lineup in December. In his tenth NHL game, Dumoulin scored his first career NHL goal against Evgeni Nabokov of the Tampa Bay Lightning, on December 15, 2014. After Rust also scored his first NHL goal that night, the two became the first Penguins pair to reach this milestone at the same time since 2006. Upon rejoining the AHL, Dumoulin led all team defensemen in assists and points with 29 and 33. Due to his play, he earned another recall to the NHL level in April 2015. He competed with the Penguins during their first-round matchup against the New York Rangers, skating an average of 14:06 minutes a night through five postseason games. On July 9, 2015, Dumoulin signed a two-year one-way contract to remain with the Penguins organization.

During the 2015 offseason, Dumoulin remained in Boston with two of his former Eagles teammates to continue off-ice workouts under strength and conditioning coach Russ DeRosa. He also began skating with High End Hockey at the Breakaway Center. Once the 2015–16 season began, Dumoulin played alongside Ben Lovejoy and became the teams' most consistent defender. As such, the defensive pairing were tasked with the Penguins' top shutdown role. Dumoulin was eventually paired with Trevor Daley and continued as one of Pittsburgh's most consistent defensemen with 16 assists and a plus-11 rating by March. Once the postseason began, Dumoulin scored his first NHL playoff goal in game five of the Eastern Conference Final against the Tampa Bay Lightning. His goal, which came with 0.7 seconds left in the first period, helped lead the Penguins to an overtime loss. Despite this loss, he helped the Penguins push for game seven and played alongside veteran Kris Letang. Dumoulin's second post-season goal came during game six of the 2016 Stanley Cup Final against the San Jose Sharks to help the team win the Stanley Cup. With a 3–1 win over the San Jose Sharks, Biddeford-born Dumoulin became the first Maine-born NHL player to hoist the Stanley Cup.

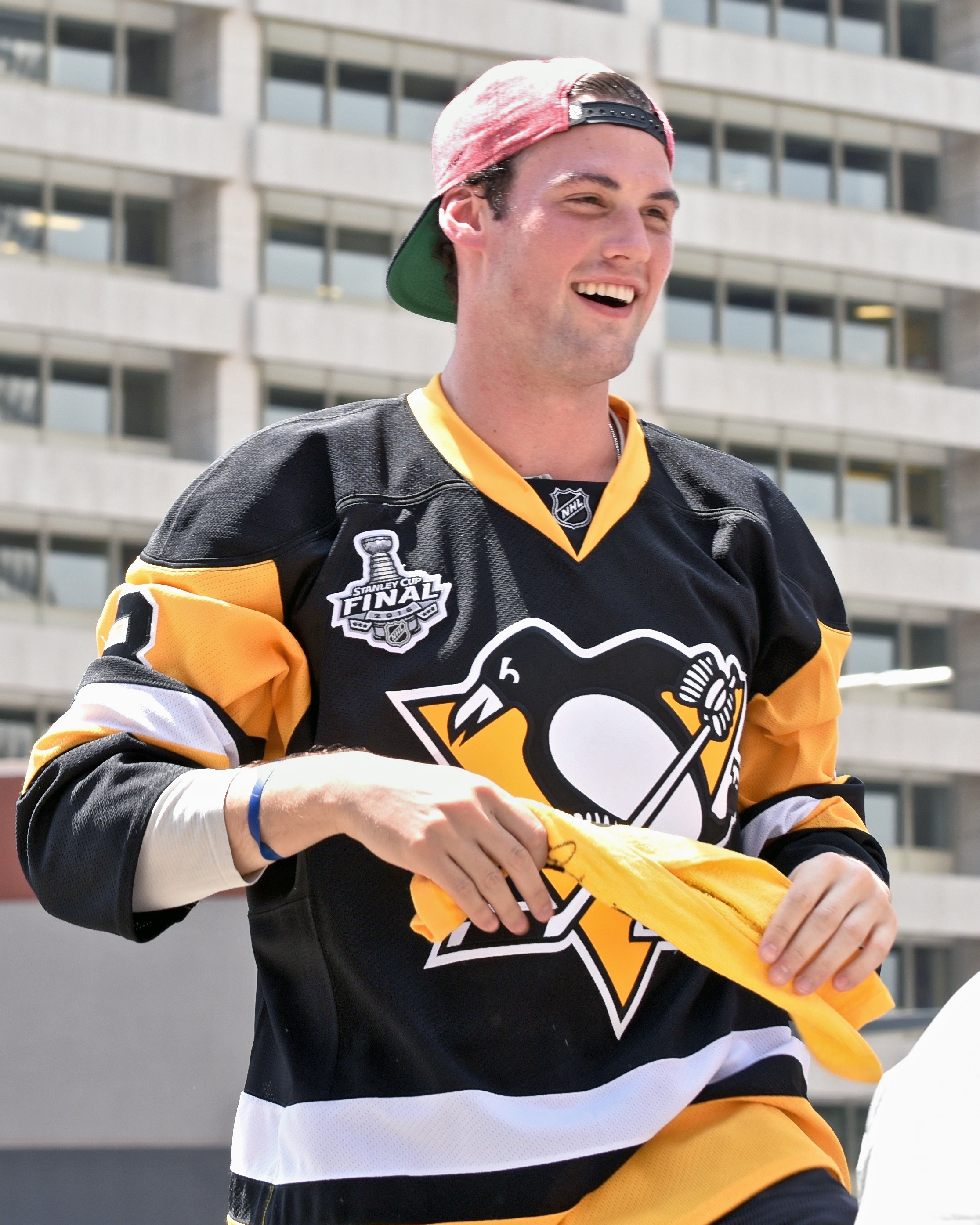
Dumoulin at the 2016 Stanley Cup Parade

Following the Stanley Cup win, Dumoulin returned to Boston and signed up for a summer course in order to finish his bachelor’s degree in marketing. Upon completing the class, he was one course away from graduating. Dumoulin returned to the Penguins lineup for the 2016–17 season with an expectation of assuming a bigger role. Dumoulin began the season tallying seven assists through 35 games before sustaining a broken jaw during a game against the New Jersey Devils in late December. As such, he was expected to miss four to six weeks in order to recover. He was activated off injured reserve on January 24, 2017, after missing 10 games and became the Penguins top defenceman following an injury to Kris Letang. He finished the regular season with one goal and 14 assists for 15 points through 70 games. His sole regular season goal came on April 4, 2017, after going 151 regular-season games without scoring, against the Columbus Blue Jackets in a 4–1 win. As the Penguins once again qualified for the Stanley Cup playoffs, Dumoulin helped the team win their second Stanley Cup on June 11, 2017. It was later revealed that Dumoulin had been playing through a hand injury that occurred after taking a slapshot off the hand in game five of the Eastern Conference quarterfinals. On July 24, 2017, the Penguins re-signed Dumoulin to a six-year, $24.6 million contract worth $4.1 million annually. The deal began during the 2017–18 season and runs through the 2022–23 season.

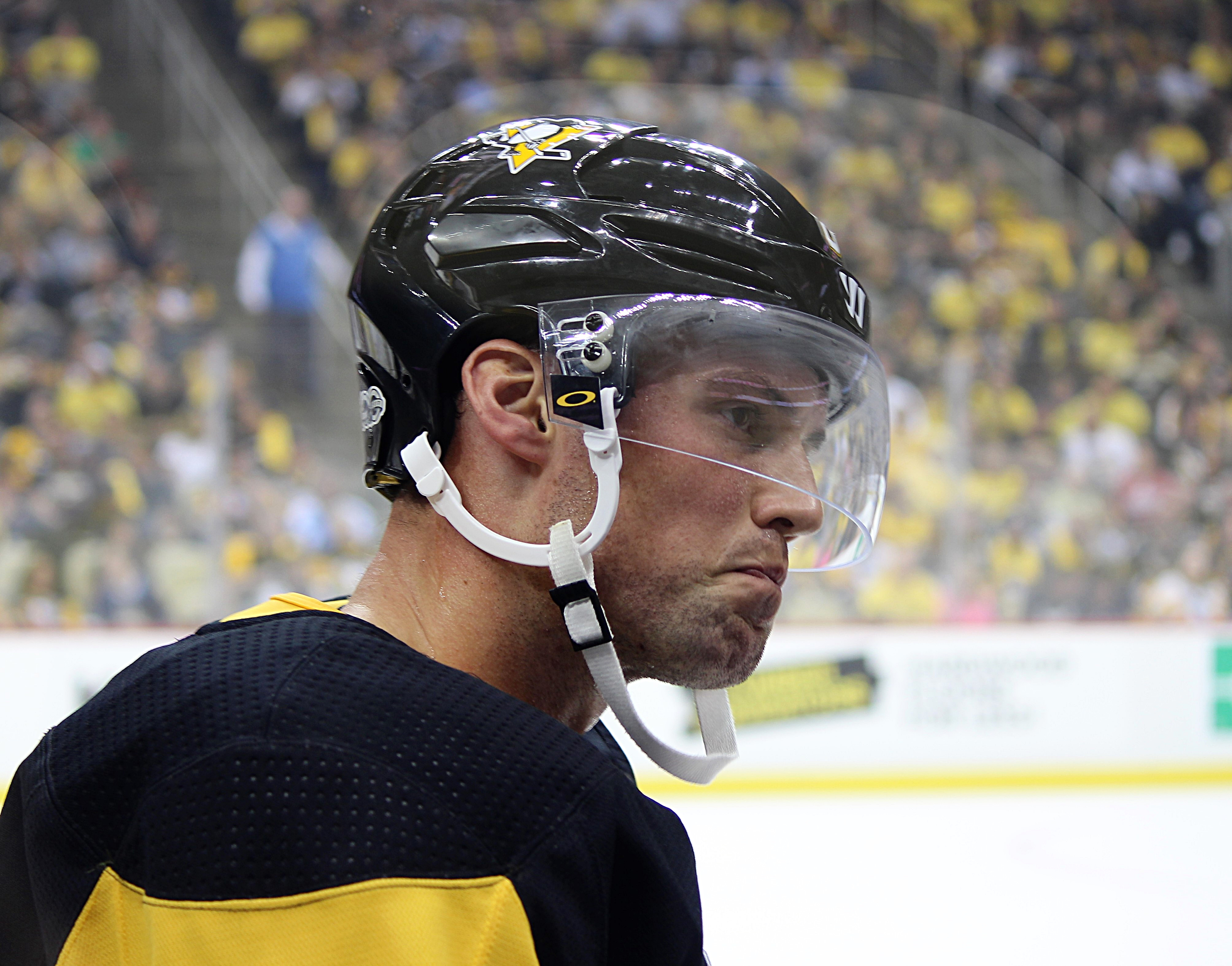
Dumoulin during the 2017–18 season

In the first year of his new contract, Dumoulin set career highs in goals, with five, and points, with 18, through 80 games. He had missed only two games during the season following a concussion. Following his return, Dumoulin also completed his bachelor's degree in marketing from BC. As the Penguins once again qualified for the Stanley Cup playoffs, they met with the Philadelphia Flyers in Round 1. Throughout the series, Dumolin continued to produce and recorded multiple points in the first two games. During game three, Dumoulin and Evgeni Malkin tied a post-season record for the fastest two goals scored by one team. His goal came five seconds after Malkin's one-timer from the right circle on a 4-on-3 power play. The Penguins eventually beat the Flyers in Game six to tie their franchise record with nine playoff series wins. Dumoulin returned to the lineup for Round 2 against the Washington Capitals but went through the NHL's concussion protocol following a hit in game two. The Penguins would end up falling to the Capitals in six games.

Dumoulin re-joined the Penguins for the 2018–19 pre-season but suffered an upper body injury during a game against the Columbus Blue Jackets. He missed a week before returning in a full-contact jersey at Penguins practice on October 3. He remained a consistent member of the Penguins lineup before being diagnosed with a concussion following their 2019 NHL Stadium Series matchup against the Flyers. He returned to the lineup after missing three games. As Letang, Olli Määttä, and Chad Ruhwedel remained out due to injuries, Dumoulin's time on ice increased and he logged over 20 minutes of ice time during a game against the Buffalo Sabres. Although he would miss the last three games of the regular season with a lower-body injury, Dumoulin recorded a career high 23 points through 76 games.

Upon finishing his career-best season, Dumoulin experienced an injury-ridden 2019–20 season. At the start of the season, he missed two games due to a lower-body injury after being a late scratch for their 3-0 loss to the Vegas Golden Knights. He returned to the Penguins lineup shortly thereafter and tallied one goal and six assists in 23 games before undergoing ankle surgery. Dumoulin subsequently missed 33 games before returning to Penguins practice on February 25, 2020.

After spending the majority of the previous season battling injuries, Dumoulin returned to the Penguins lineup to begin the 2020–21 season. Although he missed 15 games with a lower-body injury, Dumoulin improved the Penguins blueline who went 29-9-3 with him in the lineup. Dumoulin tallied four goals and 14 points in 41 games to rank fifth amongst goals scored by defencemen and fifth-most points. He finished the shortened 2020–21 season logging an average of 22 minutes, 21 seconds per game, including a team-best 2:45 on the penalty kill. Head coach Mike Sullivan praised Dumoulin's defensive abilities calling him "not just an ‘off-the-glass-and-out’ guy."

Prior to the start of the 2021–22 season, Dumoulin trained with John Marino in Boston. Together, they would skate before working out at the home gym in Dumoulin's garage in Charlestown. Once the season began, Dumoulin played eight games before being placed on the NHL's COVID-19 protocol list.

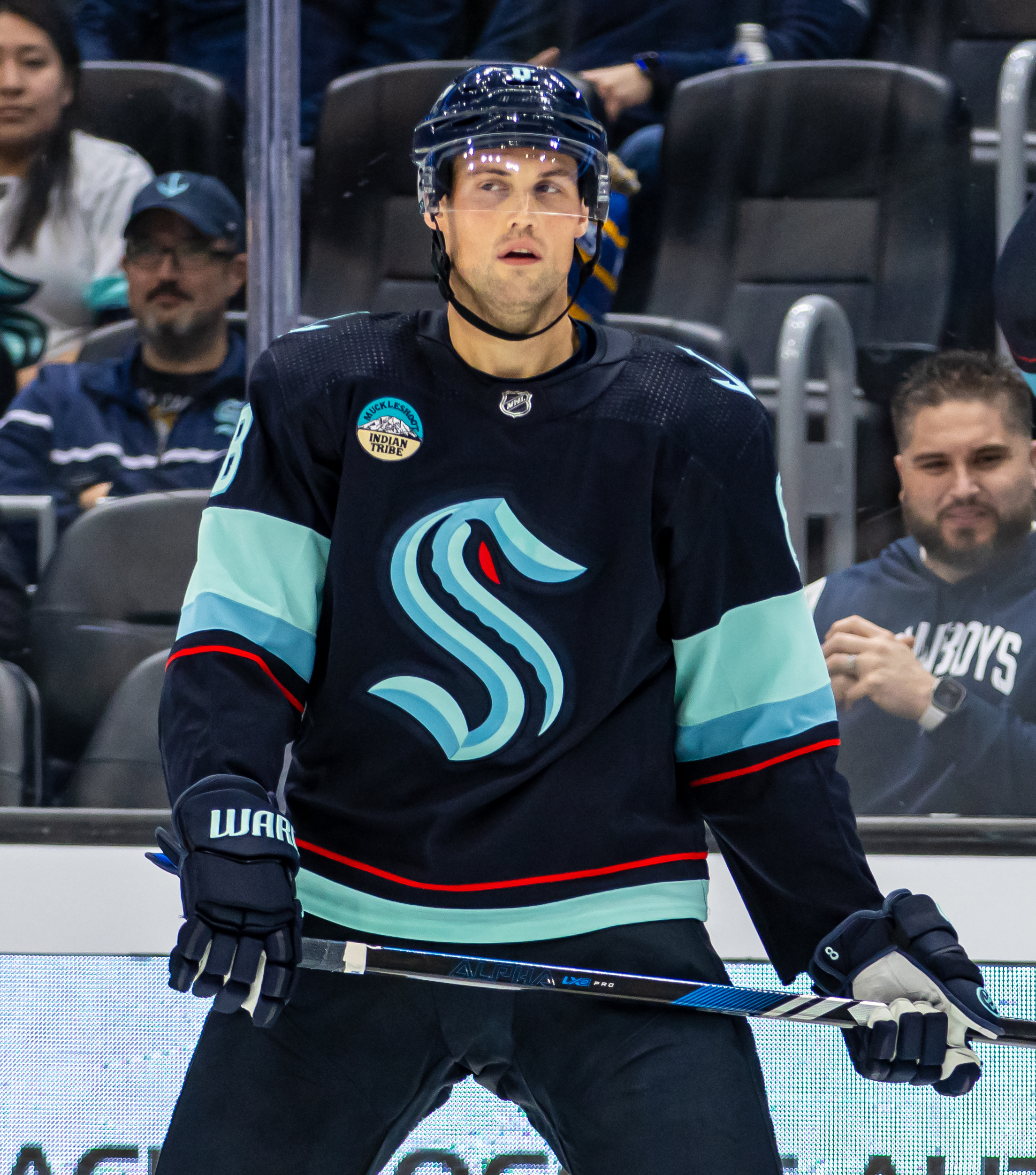
Dumoulin on the Seattle Kraken in January 2024

==== Seattle Kraken ====
On July 1, 2023, Dumoulin left the Penguins as a free agent after 10 seasons and was promptly signed to a two-year, $6.3 million contract with the Seattle Kraken. In the 2023–24 season with the Kraken, Dumoulin notched 6 goals and 10 assists for 16 points in 80 appearances from the blueline. He set a single-season career high in goals to rank third among Kraken defensemen.

==== Anaheim Ducks ====
With a year remaining on his contract, Dumoulin was traded after just one season with the Kraken to the Anaheim Ducks in exchange for a fourth round pick in 2026 on July 2, 2024.

==== New Jersey Devils ====
In the final year of his contract with Anaheim, Dumoulin was traded to the New Jersey Devils on March 6, 2025, in exchange for prospect Herman Träff and a 2025 2nd round draft pick. Dumoulin played out the remainder of the regular season for the playoff bound Devils in a second-pairing role, registering 1 goal and 6 points through 19 appearances. He went scoreless through 5 post-season games in a first-round defeat to the Carolina Hurricanes.

==== Los Angeles Kings ====
Having concluded his contract with the Devils, Dumoulin left as a free agent and was signed to a three-year, $12 million contract with the Los Angeles Kings on July 1, 2025.

== Playing style ==
As a youth, Dumoulin was described by Monarchs head coach Sean Tremblay as being similar to Ryan Whitney. He also praised Dumoulin's size and stick use. Upon signing an entry-level contract with the Hurricanes, Ron Francis described Dumoulin as a "big, puck-moving defenseman." Later, Dumoulin described himself as being "solid in my defensive zone." He credited much of his improvement since turning professional to former Wilkes-Barre/Scranton head coach John Hynes and assistant Alain Nasreddine.

== International play ==
Medal record

Representing United States

Ice hockey

World Junior Championships
Bronze medal – third place	2011 Buffalo	

As an American citizen, Dumoulin has represented the United States men's national junior ice hockey team at the junior level in international tournaments. His first international tournament was at the 2008 Ivan Hlinka Memorial Tournament where Team USA placed 7th. In his second tournament at the international level, Dumoulin helped lead Team USA to a bronze medal at the 2011 World Junior Ice Hockey Championships.

== Personal life ==
Dumoulin and his wife Kayla had their first child together in November 2019. Off the ice, Dumoulin was inspired by Anthony Bourdain to become serious about cooking. Prior to the chef's death, Dumoulin watched every episode of Anthony Bourdain: No Reservations and The Layover.

== Career statistics ==
=== Regular season and playoffs ===
			Regular season					Playoffs
Season	Team	League	GP	G	A	Pts	PIM	GP	G	A	Pts	PIM
2006–07	Biddeford High School	HS-ME	24	13	33	46		—	—	—	—	—
2007–08	Biddeford High School	HS-ME	24	13	48	61	10	—	—	—	—	—
2008–09	New Hampshire Jr. Monarchs	EJHL	41	7	23	30	30	—	—	—	—	—
2009–10	Boston College	HE	42	1	21	22	16	—	—	—	—	—
2010–11	Boston College	HE	37	3	30	33	6	—	—	—	—	—
2011–12	Boston College	HE	44	7	21	28	26	—	—	—	—	—
2012–13	Wilkes-Barre/Scranton Penguins	AHL	73	6	18	24	18	15	2	6	8	6
2013–14	Wilkes-Barre/Scranton Penguins	AHL	53	5	16	21	21	17	3	9	12	22
2013–14	Pittsburgh Penguins	NHL	6	0	1	1	4	—	—	—	—	—
2014–15	Wilkes-Barre/Scranton Penguins	AHL	62	4	29	33	18	6	0	3	3	0
2014–15	Pittsburgh Penguins	NHL	8	1	0	1	2	5	0	0	0	0
2015–16	Pittsburgh Penguins	NHL	79	0	16	16	14	24	2	6	8	2
2016–17	Pittsburgh Penguins	NHL	70	1	14	15	14	25	1	5	6	6
2017–18	Pittsburgh Penguins	NHL	80	5	13	18	30	12	1	6	7	2
2018–19	Pittsburgh Penguins	NHL	76	3	20	23	20	4	0	1	1	0
2019–20	Pittsburgh Penguins	NHL	28	1	7	8	10	4	0	1	1	4
2020–21	Pittsburgh Penguins	NHL	41	4	10	14	12	6	0	2	2	2
2021–22	Pittsburgh Penguins	NHL	76	3	15	18	24	1	0	0	0	0
2022–23	Pittsburgh Penguins	NHL	82	1	24	25	16	—	—	—	—	—
2023–24	Seattle Kraken	NHL	80	6	10	16	20	—	—	—	—	—
2024–25	Anaheim Ducks	NHL	61	2	14	16	10	—	—	—	—	—
2024–25	New Jersey Devils	NHL	19	1	5	6	4	5	0	0	0	0
2025–26	Los Angeles Kings	NHL	82	2	15	17	22	4	0	0	0	2
NHL totals			788	30	164	194	202	90	4	21	25	18

=== International ===
Year	Team	Event	Result	GP	G	A	Pts	PIM
2008	United States	HG18	7th	4	0	0	0	0
2011	United States	WJC	3rd place, bronze medalist(s)	6	0	2	2	2
Junior totals				6	0	2	2	2

== Awards and honors ==
Awards	Year	Ref
College
All-Hockey East Rookie Team	2009–10	
NCAA All-Tournament Team	2010, 2012	
All-Hockey East First Team	2010–11, 2011–12	
Hockey East Best Defensive Defenseman	2010–11	
NHL
Stanley Cup champion	2016, 2017	

Awards and achievements
Preceded by Justin Braun	Hockey East Best Defensive Defenseman; 2010–11 / 2011–12	Succeeded by Patrick Wey
