= Louis Lausier =

American politician

Louis B. Lausier
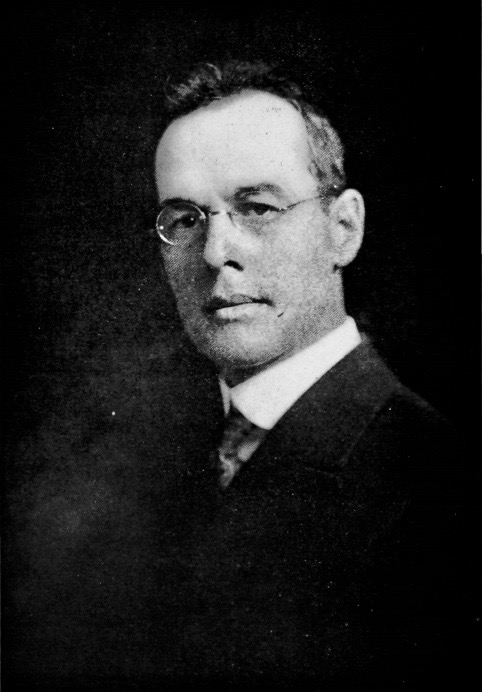

Member of the Maine House of Representatives
- In office 1919–1920

Member of the Maine House of Representatives
- In office 1924–1926

Mayor of Biddeford, Maine
- In office 1941–1955

Personal details
- Born: November 17, 1879 Biddeford, Maine
- Died: January 14, 1962 (aged 82) Biddeford, Maine
- Party: Democratic
- Occupation: Lawyer

Louis B. "Papa" Lausier (November 17, 1879 – January 14, 1962) was a Maine politician. Lausier was born in 1879 in Biddeford to Antoine and Aurilie (Cartier) Lausier. He studied at the Collège de Sainte-Anne-de-la-Pocatière in Quebec before returning to Biddeford to study law under Maine Supreme Judicial Court Justice George F. Haley. He passed the Maine bar in 1906 and entered Biddeford municipal government, holding the positions of city auditor, municipal judge and alderman. A Democrat, Lausier represented Biddeford, Maine in the Maine House of Representatives from 1919–20 and 1925–26. Lausier was a delegate to the Democratic National Convention in 1940 and 1948. In 1948, Lausier sought and received his party's nomination for Governor of Maine. He lost to Republican Frederick G. Payne, gaining 34% of the vote. Lausier served as mayor of Biddeford from 1941–55. While mayor, Lausier was fiscally conservative and refused for the city to obtain debt. While mayor, many criticized him for ignoring non Franco-Americans living in the town, especially because of the poor quality of the public schools. He was defeated in the Democratic primary for mayor in 1955 by Albert C. Lambert.

Lausier died in January 1962. Then Governor of Maine John H. Reed said of Lausier at the time of his death:

"Mayor Lausier will be remembered for steadfast devotion to his party ideals and the interest which he always maintained in furthering the progress of his city and state".

== See also ==
- List of mayors of Biddeford, Maine

Party political offices
Preceded by F. Davis Clark	Democratic nominee for Governor of Maine; 1948	Succeeded by Earle S. Grant
