= 1964 United States Senate election in Maine =

- November 3, 1964
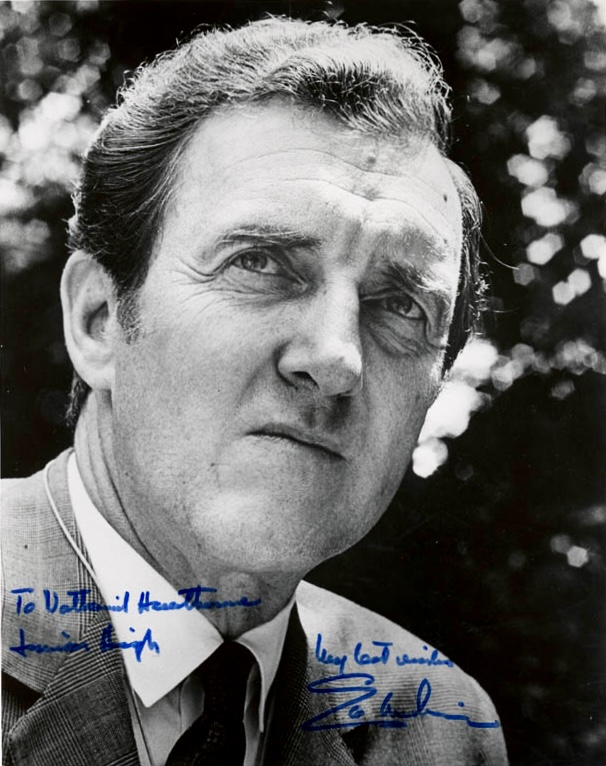

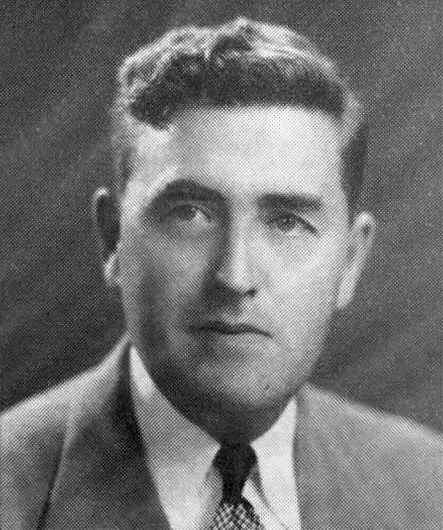
Nominee	Edmund Muskie	Clifford McIntire
Party	Democratic	Republican
Popular vote	253,511	127,040
Percentage	66.62%	33.38%
- Muskie: 50–60% 60–70% 70–80% 80–90% >90% McIntire: 50–60% 60–70% 70–80% 80–90% >90% Tie: 50%
U.S. senator before election
Edmund Muskie
Democratic
Elected U.S. Senator
Edmund Muskie
Democratic

The 1964 United States Senate election in Maine was held on November 3, 1964. Incumbent Democrat Edmund Muskie was re-elected to a second term in office over Republican U.S. Representative Clifford McIntire. This was the first senate race for this particular seat in which the election was held in November and not September. This was the first time ever that an incumbent Democratic Senator from Maine was re-elected to a second full term. This was also the only time when a Democrat won Maine in the presidential election and the Senate election in Maine in the same year.

== Democratic primary ==
=== Candidates ===
- Edmund Muskie, incumbent Senator since 1959

=== Results ===
Senator Muskie was unopposed for re-nomination.

1964 Democratic U.S. Senate primary
Party	Candidate	Votes	%
Democratic	Edmund Muskie (incumbent)	33,034	100.00%
Total votes		33,034	100.00%

== Republican primary ==
=== Candidates ===
- Clifford McIntire, U.S. Representative from Perham

=== Results ===
Representative McIntire was unopposed for the Republican nomination.

1964 Republican U.S. Senate primary
Party	Candidate	Votes	%
Republican	Clifford McIntire	65,905	100.00%
Total votes		65,905	100.00%

== General election ==
=== Candidates ===
- Clifford McIntire, Republican
- Edmund Muskie, Democratic

=== Results ===
1964 United States Senate election in Maine
Party	Candidate	Votes	%	±%
Democratic	Edmund Muskie (incumbent)	253,511	66.62%	▲5.86
Republican	Clifford McIntire	127,040	33.38%	▼5.86
Total votes		323,860	100.00%	N/A
Democratic hold				
