= Louis Liotti =

American ice hockey player (born 1985)

- Born: May 25, 1985 (age 40) Westbury, New York, U.S.
- Height: 6 ft 1 in (185 cm)
- Weight: 196 lb (89 kg; 14 st 0 lb)
- Position: Defense
- Shot: Right
- Played for: Worcester Sharks; Lake Erie Monsters; Bridgeport Sound Tigers; EfB Ishockey; WSV Sterzing Broncos; KS Cracovia
- NHL draft: Undrafted
- Playing career: 2009–2015

Louis Liotti (born May 25, 1985) is an American former professional ice hockey defenseman. He last played with KS Cracovia in the Polska Liga Hokejowa.

== Playing career ==
Liotti played junior hockey with the Sioux City Musketeers in the United States Hockey League.

Liotti attended the Northeastern University where he played four seasons (2005 – 2009) in NCAA's Hockey East conference with the Northeastern Huskies men's ice hockey team. In his senior year Liotti was recognized for his outstanding play when he was named the Hockey East Best Defensive Defenseman.

He subsequently signed a contract with the Worcester Sharks to make his professional debut in the American Hockey League during the 2009–10 season.

On July 9, 2012, Liotti opted to leave North America and sign his first European contract with Danish club, EfB Ishockey of the AL-Bank Ligaen. Liotti assumed a prominent role with Esbjerg scoring 19 points in 36 games from the blueline.

Prior to the 2013–14 season, Liotti returned to North America and attended the Utica Comets inaugural training camp. After his release he was signed to a one-year contract with Italian club, WSV Sterzing Broncos of the Elite.A on October 13, 2013.

== Career statistics ==
			Regular season					Playoffs
Season	Team	League	GP	G	A	Pts	PIM	GP	G	A	Pts	PIM
2002–03	New York Apple Core	EJHL	33	3	2	5	26	—	—	—	—	—
2003–04	Sioux City Musketeers	USHL	60	1	13	14	36	7	1	4	5	0
2004–05	Sioux City Musketeers	USHL	56	3	11	14	36	13	1	1	2	10
2005–06	Northeastern University	HE	34	1	5	6	61	—	—	—	—	—
2006–07	Northeastern University	HE	36	0	6	6	38	—	—	—	—	—
2007–08	Northeastern University	HE	36	1	4	5	26	—	—	—	—	—
2008–09	Northeastern University	HE	40	4	9	13	53	—	—	—	—	—
2009–10	Worcester Sharks	AHL	10	0	1	1	4	—	—	—	—	—
2009–10	Kalamazoo Wings	ECHL	52	1	12	13	43	5	0	0	0	2
2010–11	Reading Royals	ECHL	57	0	13	13	22	8	0	2	2	6
2010–11	Lake Erie Monsters	AHL	3	0	0	0	0	—	—	—	—	—
2010–11	Bridgeport Sound Tigers	AHL	1	0	0	0	0	—	—	—	—	—
2011–12	Reading Royals	ECHL	50	2	5	7	50	5	0	0	0	2
2012–13	EfB Ishockey	DEN	36	4	15	19	30	6	0	3	3	6
2013–14	WSV Sterzing Broncos	ITL	33	4	17	21	44	6	1	2	3	16
2014–15	KS Cracovia	PHL	43	3	18	21	34	2	0	0	0	4
AHL totals			14	0	1	1	4	—	—	—	—	—

== Awards and honors ==
Award	Year
Hockey East Best Defensive Defenseman	2008–09

Awards and achievements
Preceded by Joe Charlebois	Hockey East Best Defensive Defenseman; 2008–09	Succeeded by Justin Braun
