= Alan Casavant =

American politician

Mayor of Biddeford, Maine
- In office November 2011 – November 2023
- Preceded by: Joanne Twomey
- Succeeded by: Martin Grohman

Member of the Maine House of Representatives from the 137th district
- In office December 2006 – December 2014
- Preceded by: Stedman Seavey
- Succeeded by: Stedman Seavey

Personal details
- Born: July 26, 1952 (age 73)
- Party: Democratic
- Education: University of Maine; University of Southern Maine
- Profession: Teacher

Alan M. Casavant (born July 26, 1952) is an American politician from Maine. Casavant, a Democrat, represented District 137 in the Maine House of Representatives from 2006 to 2014. District 137 comprised portions of Biddeford and Kennebunk. Casavant was unable to seek re-election in 2014 due to term-limits. Casavant was the elected Mayor of Biddeford, holding that position from November 2011 when he defeated incumbent Mayor Joanne Twomey until 2023 when he was defeated by current Mayor Martin Grohman. Prior to that, His support grew during the 2017 election. He served as a Biddeford City Council member from 1976 to 1992. He retired as a teacher at Biddeford High School in 2012.

Casavant earned a B.S. (Bachelors's Degree of Science) in psychology from the University of Maine in 1974. In 2004, he earned a M.A. in American and New England Studies from the University of Southern Maine.

== See also ==
- List of mayors of Biddeford, Maine
