= Robert H. Reny =

American businessman

- Born: Robert Henry Reny; March 23, 1926
- Died: July 24, 2009 (aged 83); Damariscotta, Maine, U.S.
- Resting place: St. Patrick's Catholic Cemetery, Damariscotta, Maine, U.S.
- Spouse: Carolyn "Lynn" Denny (m. 1950–2009; his death)

Robert Henry Reny (commonly known as R. H. Reny; March 23, 1926 – July 24, 2009) was an American businessman. He established the Renys department store in 1949.

== Life and career ==
Reny was born in 1926, one of the five children of Edward Reny and Grace Reilly. He grew up in Biddeford, Maine, and graduated from Biddeford High School. He then enlisted in the United States Navy, who sent him to Dartmouth College on a four-year program. He completed it in two years.

Upon returning from service in World War II, he began working for R. H. White, a department store in Boston. Returning to Maine, he worked for Senter's department store in Damariscotta. He asked his manager for a raise, which was granted, but his manager was also his landlord, and he raised Reny's rent by the same amount. It was then that Reny decided to establish his own business, called Renys, across the street. It opened on October 6, 1949. After busy fall and Christmas seasons, the new year of 1950 saw business slow down. Reny began selling his goods door to door from the back of his Hudson.

In 1950, Reny married Carolyn "Lynn" Denny, with whom he had three sons, including John and Bob, who later became the president and vice-president, respectively, of Renys. John took over from his father in 2004; 47 years after he began working for him.

== Death ==
Reny died in Damariscotta in 2009, aged 83. He was interred in St. Patrick's Catholic Cemetery in Damariscotta. His widow, who survived him by seven years, was buried beside him upon her death in 2016, aged 91.

== Publications ==
- Guide to Bar Harbor, Maine (1890)
