= Charles A. Shaw =

American politician

Charles A. Shaw, circa 1889

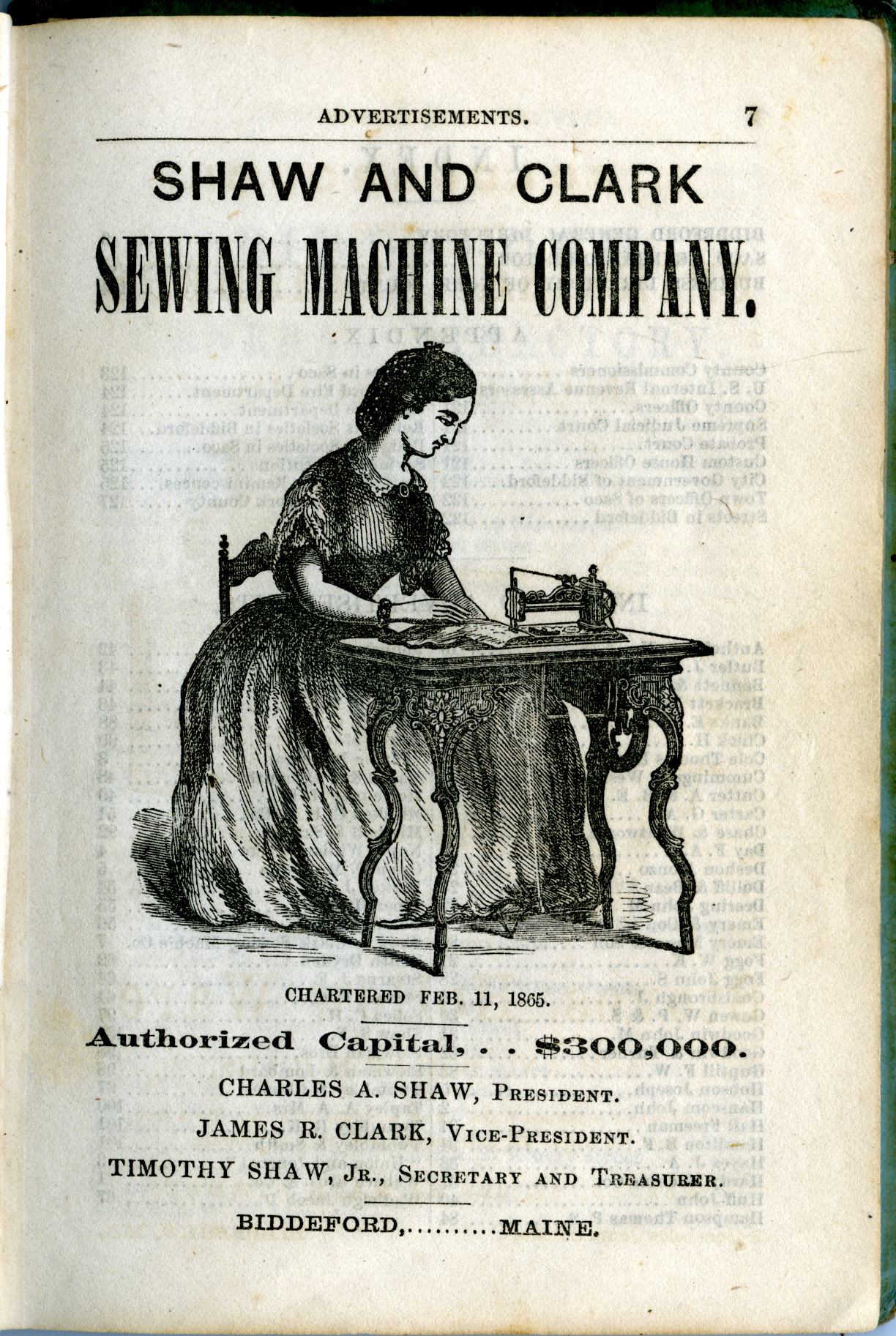
Shaw & Clark Sewing Machine Company advertisement, from the 1866 Biddeford City Directory, page 7

Charles Albert Shaw (1831–1909) was a 19th-century New England politician, inventor, and showman. He was born in Sanford, Maine, the son of Samuel Madison Shaw, and a great-grandson of General Timothy Shaw, of Shaw's Ridge, Sanford.

== Biography ==
He attended schools in Alfred, Maine, and by age 14 was teaching and had invented his first creation: a perpetual calendar about the size of a dollar. He then worked as a shop clerk and in a newspaper, before apprenticing as a jeweler and watchmaker. Upon completion of his apprenticeship in 1852, he moved to Biddeford, Maine and with John Clark set up the firm of Shaw & Clark-watchmakers and jewelers. He was married in Salem, Massachusetts on February 11, 1856, to Sophie Priest "both of Biddeford". Shaw & Clark were in business together 14 years, eventually moving up to manufacture small portable sewing machines, which were very popular in the Western U.S. Eventually they were among the largest sewing machines manufacturers in the country at the time, and they employed more than 6000 workers in five factories. He managed and then befriended both Artemus Ward and P.T. Barnum, both of whom visited and spoke frequently at Biddeford while Shaw resided there.

Shaw was mayor of Biddeford, Maine from 1865 to 1866 and was outspoken in his opinions about the Civil War- in the view that the question of slavery was not something with which the Northern States should involve themselves. In 1867 he spent year in Paris as the commissioner from Maine to the World's Fair. He moved to Boston in 1872 and became a half-owner of the Austin & Stone's Museum, a position he held until his death in 1909.

== Patents ==
- Churn (1856) #16193
- Apparatus for tanning skins (1858) #19211
- Pie crimper (1860) #30592
- Improvement in bobbins (1863) #40952
- Improved Loom Shuttle (1878) #210874
- Car-signal (1887) #373063
- (Boot and shoe) Last (1887) #375575
- Burner for illuminating gas (1894) #522088

== See also ==
- List of mayors of Biddeford, Maine
