= 1970 United States Senate election in Maine =

- November 3, 1970
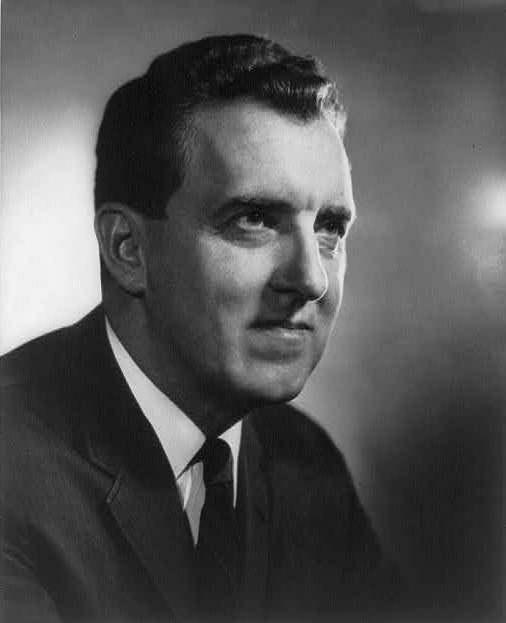

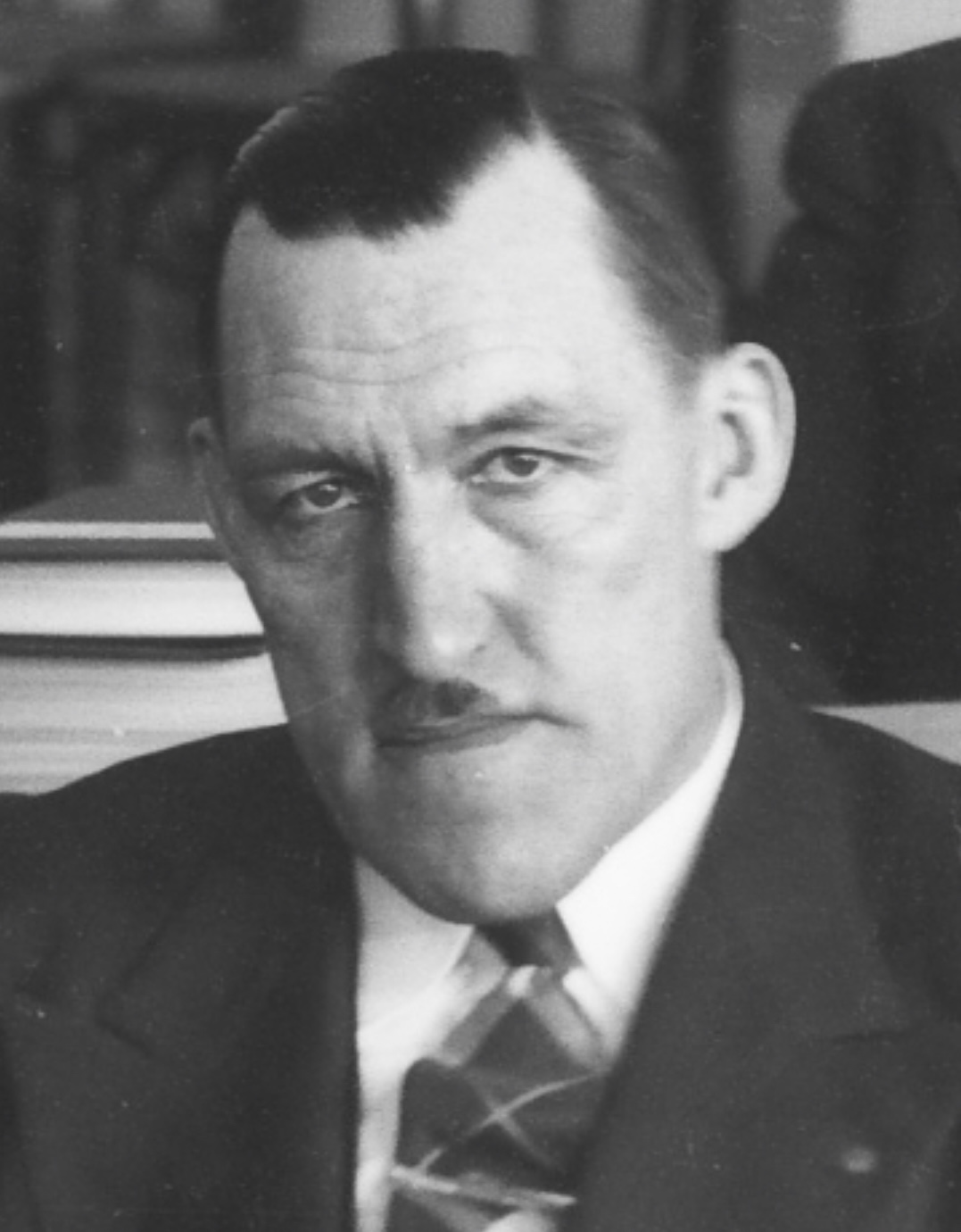
Nominee	Edmund Muskie	Neil S. Bishop
Party	Democratic	Republican
Popular vote	199,954	123,906
Percentage	61.74%	38.26%
- Muskie: 50–60% 60–70% 70–80% 80–90% >90% Bishop: 50–60% 60–70% 70–80% 80–90% Tie: 50%
U.S. senator before election
Edmund Muskie
Democratic
Elected U.S. Senator
Edmund Muskie
Democratic

The 1970 United States Senate election in Maine was held on November 3, 1970. Incumbent Democrat Edmund Muskie defeated Republican nominee Neil S. Bishop with 61.74% of the vote. It's believed Muskie's coattails helped Democratic Governor Kenneth Curtis narrowly win reelection in the concurrent gubernatorial election. Bishop had crossed party lines to support Muskie's first run for high office, becoming a prominent Republican endorser when Muskie ran for Governor of Maine in 1954.

== Primary elections ==
Primary elections were held on June 15, 1970.

=== Republican primary ===
==== Candidates ====
- Neil S. Bishop, former State Senator
- Abbott O. Greene

==== Results ====
Republican primary results
Party	Candidate	Votes	%
Republican	Neil S. Bishop	45,216	59.83
Republican	Abbott O. Greene	30,201	39.96
Total votes		75,577	100.00

== General election ==
=== Candidates ===
- Edmund Muskie, Democratic
- Neil S. Bishop, Republican

=== Results ===
1970 United States Senate election in Maine
Party	Candidate	Votes	%
Democratic	Edmund Muskie (incumbent)	199,954	61.74%
Republican	Neil S. Bishop	123,906	38.26%
Total votes		323,860	100.00%
Democratic hold			
