= 1958 United States Senate election in Maine =

- September 8, 1958
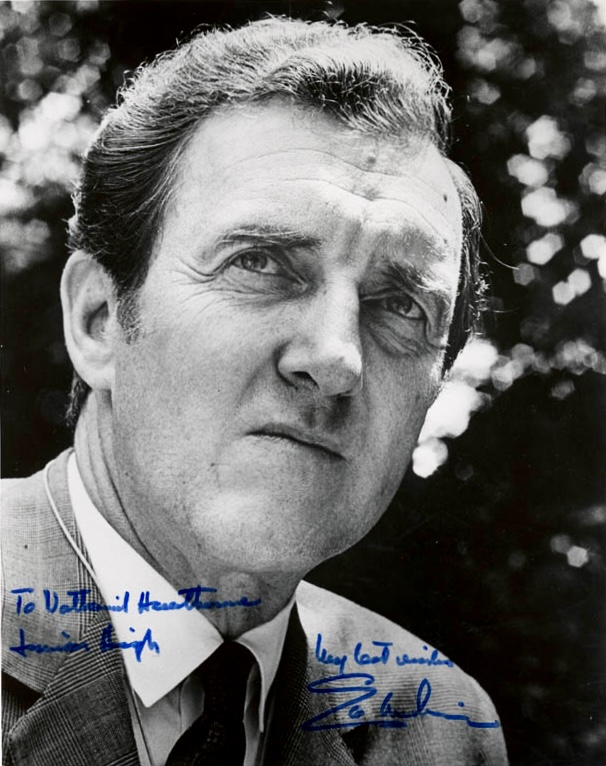

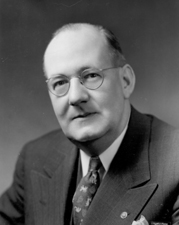
Nominee	Edmund Muskie	Frederick G. Payne
Party	Democratic	Republican
Popular vote	172,704	111,522
Percentage	60.76%	39.24%
- County results Muskie: 50–60% 60–70% Payne: 50–60%
U.S. senator before election
Frederick G. Payne
Republican
Elected U.S. Senator
Edmund Muskie
Democratic

The 1958 United States Senate election in Maine was held on September 8, 1958, to elect a United States senator. Incumbent Republican Senator Frederick G. Payne lost re-election to a second term, losing by a wide margin to Democrat Edmund Muskie, the popular incumbent Governor of Maine.

This was one of a record 15 seats Democrats gained from the Republican Party in the 1958 United States Senate elections. This was the first time Democrats won a Senate race in Maine since the 1910 election for this seat, thus this was the first time a Democrat was popularly elected to the Senate from Maine.

== Republican primary ==
=== Candidates ===
- Frederick G. Payne, incumbent Senator
- Herman D. Sahagian, former member of the Maine Republican Committee

=== Results ===
1958 Republican U.S. Senate primary
Party	Candidate	Votes	%
Republican	Frederick G. Payne (incumbent)	82,448	83.64%
Republican	Herman D. Sahagian	16,133	16.37%
Total votes		98,581	100.00%

== Democratic primary ==
=== Candidates ===
- Edmund Muskie, Governor of Maine

=== Results ===
Governor Muskie was unopposed for the Democratic nomination.

1958 Democratic U.S. Senate primary
Party	Candidate	Votes	%
Democratic	Edmund Muskie	39,202	100.00%
Total votes		39,202	100.00%

== General election ==
=== Results ===
General election results
Party	Candidate	Votes	%	±%
Democratic	Edmund Muskie	172,704	60.76%	▲25.90
Republican	Frederick G. Payne (incumbent)	111,522	39.24%	▼19.46
Total votes		284,226	100.00%	N/A
Democratic gain from Republican				

== See also ==
- 1958 United States Senate elections
