= 1948 Maine gubernatorial election =

- September 13, 1948
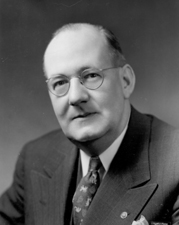

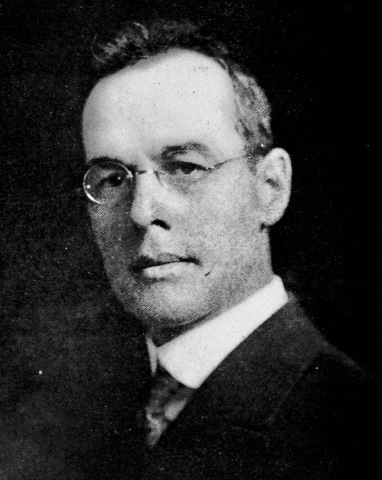
Nominee	Frederick G. Payne	Louis B. Lausier
Party	Republican	Democratic
Popular vote	145,956	76,544
Percentage	65.60%	34.40%
- County results Payne: 60–70% 70–80% 80–90% Lausier: 50–60%
Governor before election
Horace A. Hildreth
Republican
Elected Governor
Frederick G. Payne
Republican

The 1948 Maine gubernatorial election took place on September 13, 1948. Incumbent Republican Governor Horace A. Hildreth, was term limited and seeking election to the United States Senate (eventually losing the Republican primary to Margaret Chase Smith), thus did not run. Republican Frederick G. Payne, the former mayor of Augusta, faced off against Democratic challenger Louis B. Lausier, the mayor of Biddeford. Payne defeated Lausier in a landslide. Neil S. Bishop unsuccessfully ran for the Republican nomination

Payne dispatched four other Republicans in the GOP primary, including Bishop; his closest opponent was Maine Senate President George D. Varney. Lausier defeated former state senator Leland Currier in the Democratic primary.

== Republican primary ==
=== Candidates ===
- Neil S. Bishop, of Bowdoinham, state senator
- Roy L. Fernald, of Winterport, former state senator
- Frederick G. Payne, of Waldoboro, businessman and former mayor of Augusta
- George D. Varney, of Kittery, President of the Maine Senate, former Speaker of the Maine House of Representatives
- Robinson Verrill, of Portland, attorney

=== Results ===
Republican primary results
Party	Candidate	Votes	%
Republican	Frederick G. Payne	43,554	36.11
Republican	George D. Varney	35,882	29.75
Republican	Robinson Verrill	14,466	11.98
Republican	Roy L. Fernald	14,073	11.67
Republican	Neil S. Bishop	12,648	10.49
Total votes		120,623	100.00

== Democratic primary ==
=== Candidates ===
- Leland Currier, of Lewiston, former state senator
- Louis B. Lausier, of Biddeford, mayor of Biddeford

=== Results ===
Democratic primary results
Party	Candidate	Votes	%
Democratic	Louis B. Lausier	11,711	57.57
Democratic	Leland Currier	8,630	42.43
Total votes		20,341	100.00

== Results ==
1948 Gubernatorial Election, Maine
Party	Candidate	Votes	%	±%
Republican	Frederick G. Payne	145,956	65.60%	−
Democratic	Louis B. Lausier	76,544	34.40%	−
Majority		69,412	31.20%	

=== Counties that flipped from Republican to Democratic ===
- York (largest town: Biddeford)
