= 1952 United States Senate election in Maine =

- September 8, 1952
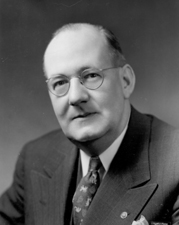

Nominee	Frederick G. Payne	Roger P. Dube	Earl S. Grant
Party	Republican	Democratic	Independent Democratic
Popular vote	139,205	82,665	15,294
Percentage	58.70%	34.86%	6.45%
- County results Payne: 40–50% 50–60% 60–70% 70–80% Dube: 40–50%
U.S. senator before election
Owen Brewster
Republican
Elected U.S. Senator
Frederick G. Payne
Democratic

The 1952 United States Senate election in Maine was held on September 8, 1952.

Incumbent Republican Senator Owen Brewster ran for re-election to a third term, but lost the Republican primary to Governor of Maine Frederick Payne. Payne easily won the general election against two Democratic opponents, party nominee Roger Dube and independent Democrat Earl Grant.

== Republican primary ==
=== Candidates ===
- Owen Brewster, incumbent Senator since 1941
- Frederick G. Payne, Governor of Maine

=== Campaign ===
Payne's campaign was encouraged and partly funded by billionaire Howard Hughes, who sought to end Brewster's political career over the investigation of Hughes's Trans World Airlines for war profiteering.

Payne's victory may also have been aided by Brewster's connections to McCarthyism.

=== Results ===
1952 Republican U.S. Senate primary
Party	Candidate	Votes	%
Republican	Frederick G. Payne	68,690	51.25%
Republican	Owen Brewster (inc.)	65,334	48.75%
Total votes		134,024	100.00%

== Democratic primary ==
=== Candidates ===
- Roger P. Dube
- Earl S. Grant

=== Results ===
1952 Democratic U.S. Senate primary
Party	Candidate	Votes	%
Democratic	Roger P. Dube	12,569	56.77%
Democratic	Earl S. Grant	9,572	43.23%
Total votes		22,141	100.00%

== General election ==
=== Results ===
General election results
Party	Candidate	Votes	%	±%
Republican	Frederick G. Payne	139,205	58.70%	▼4.85
Democratic	Roger P. Dube	82,665	34.86%	▼1.59
Independent Democrat	Earl S. Grant	15,294	6.45%	N/A
Total votes		237,164	100.00%	

== See also ==
- 1952 United States Senate elections
