= Biddeford High School =

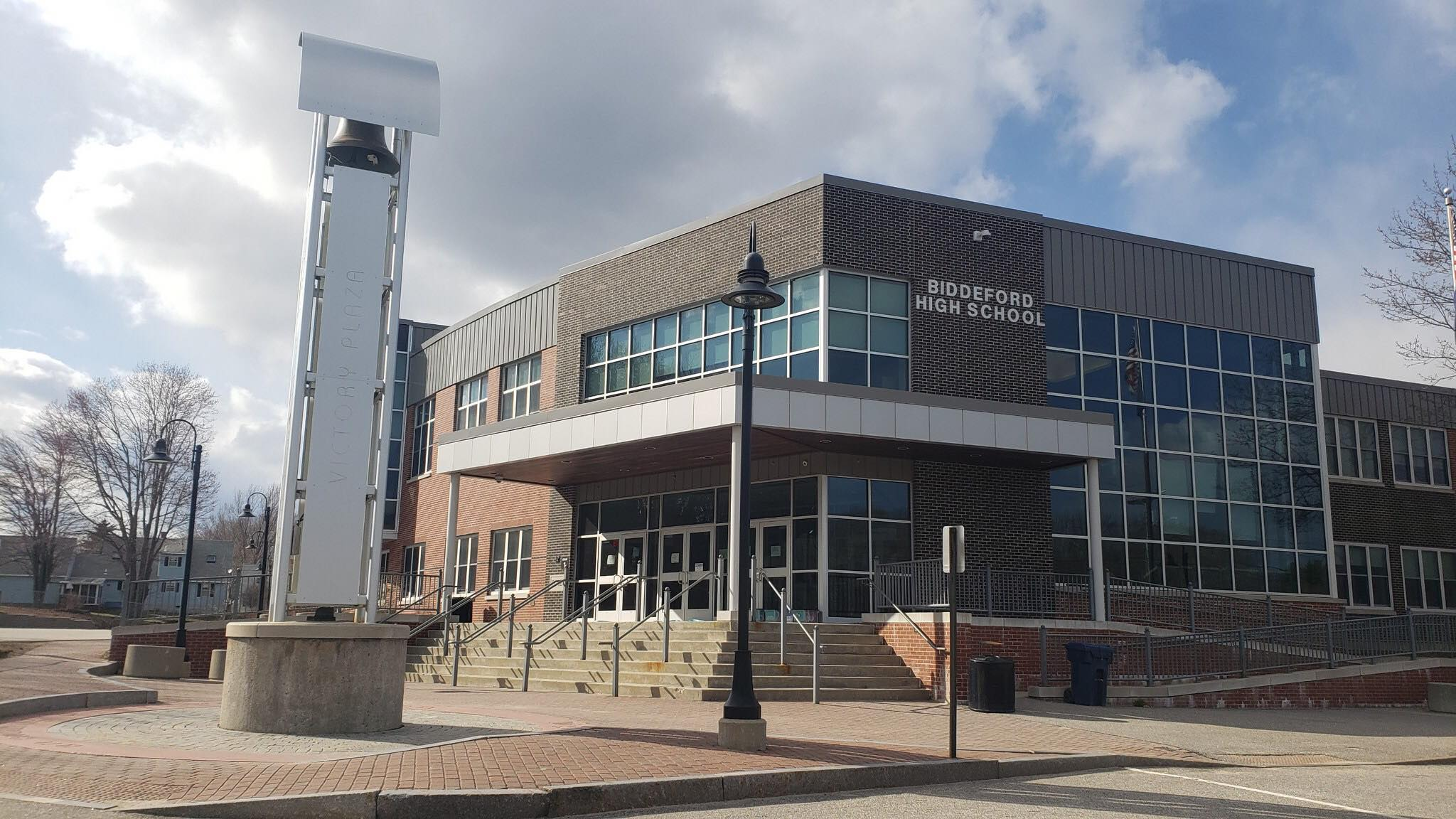

Location
- 20 Maplewood Avenue; Biddeford, Maine 04005; United States; 43°29′43″N 70°28′19″W

Information
- Type: Public
- Established: 1848
- School district: Biddeford Public Schools
- Superintendent: Jeremy Ray
- NCES School ID: 230315000072
- Principal: Martha Murray
- Teaching staff: 63.20 (on an FTE basis)
- Grades: 8–12
- Enrollment: 901 (2023-2024)
- Student to teacher ratio: 14.26
- Campus type: Suburban
- Colors: Orange and black
- Mascot: Tigers
- Accreditation: NEASC
- Newspaper: The Roar
- Website: www.biddefordschools.me/o/bhs-apc/

Biddeford High School (BHS) is a public high school in Biddeford, Maine, United States. It is the secondary school for Biddeford Public Schools, a school district which exclusively serves the city of Biddeford.

== History ==
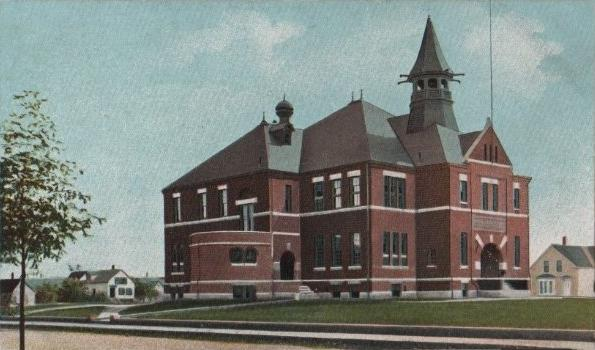
Alfred Street Building. Site of Biddeford High School between 1890 and the 1960s.

The first public high school in Biddeford was established in 1929 The building for the high school was erected on Washington Street close to the city's downtown. After a rise in Biddeford's population in the late 19th-century, a new high school was constructed in 1933 on a lot in close-by Alfred Street. The former high school building on Washington Street was then converted to a primary school before being demolished in the 1960s.

The high school moved to its new building in 1933 The Alfred Street building suffered a massive fire in 1993 and was promptly rebuilt. A rear annex and gymnasium were added in 1940.

The high school moved out of the Alfred Street building in the 1960s to its present location farther away from the Downtown core. This coincided with the establishment of the Biddeford Regional Center of Technology in 1969 located at the same location.

== Sports ==
Biddeford High School football has won 11 Class A state championships since 1950 (in 1965, 1966, 1967, 1971, 1980, 1983, 1984, 1990, 1991, 1993, and 1994). The school has a long-standing football rivalry with Saco's Thornton Academy dating to 1893 which is referred to as the "Battle of the Bridges" by residents of both communities. This is in reference to the multiple bridges which interconnect the two cities over the Saco River. After Biddeford High School was demoted to Class B in 2015, the two teams no longer compete with one another within the same Class.

In 1971, the boys and girls gymnastics teams won dual state championships. The boys' team repeated as state champions in 1972, while the girls' team would win the state championship again in 1979 and 2003. Biddeford High won the Class A competitive cheerleading state championships in 2002, 2008, 2009, 2010, 2014, 2019, and 2020, with the 2014 team capping off the season by winning the New England Championship in the coed division. Other Class A state championships include: ice hockey (in 2007, 2008, and 2010), softball (in 2006, 2016, and 2022), field hockey (in 1990 and 2018), baseball (in 1984 and 2025), girls' volleyball (in 2010 and 2022), boys' basketball (in 1924), boys' golf (in 1993 and 1994), boys' outdoor track (in 1995), and girls' outdoor track (in 1980, 1981, 1982, 1983, and 1998). In 1977, Biddeford High won the Class B boys' hockey state championship. The co-op team consisting of York, Biddeford, and Old Orchard Beach High Schools captured the Class B boys' hockey state championship in 2026.

The 1973-74 Biddeford High School Girls' basketball team finished their season with a perfect 15-0 record and captured the Big 8 Championship title. Following their perfect season, they were challenged by undefeated Androscoggin League Champion Lewiston High School to a game that would determine the “unofficial” state championship. The Tigers traveled to Lewiston and returned home with a 47-21 victory. The 1973-1974 season would be the final season for girls' basketball not to be recognized as “official” state champions by the Maine Principals Association, which sanctioned, and began naming female champions the following year in 1975, three years after the passage of Title IX.

== Academic Competitions ==
Biddeford students taking part in the 1971 Southern Maine Regional Science Fair held at Falmouth High School came home with five of the nine first-place awards. Altogether, Biddeford High School students earned 12 of the 22 total awards.

In 1972, Biddeford High students won the statewide first place Novice Trophy in debate at Brunswick High School.

Biddeford High School's Marching Band won first place in the Division 1 category at the 2024 New England Scholastic Band Association (NESBA) Championship.

In April 2025, Biddeford High’s Marching Arts program took top honors at the New England Scholastic Band Association (NESBA) Winter Percussion Finals. BlackOut Percussion earned first place, while Blizzard Winds secured a third-place finish.

Also in April 2025, Biddeford High School’s Performance and Technical Teams were named Maine Odyssey of the Mind State Champions and World Finalists during the State Finals Tournament.

At the New England Scholastic Band Association 2026 Winter Finals, Biddeford High School’s BlackOut Percussion, Blizzard Winds, and Blaze Color Guard all finished first place in their respective category.

== Notable alumni ==
- Fred Davis Jr., politician
- Brian Dumoulin, professional ice hockey player
- Ryan Fecteau, politician and the Speaker of the Maine House of Representatives
- Dennis Gadbois, former football wide receiver
- Robert H. Reny, founder of Renys department stores

=== Notable staff ===
- Alan Casavant, politician and teacher
