= List of mayors of Biddeford, Maine =

The following is a list of mayors of the city of Biddeford, Maine, United States.

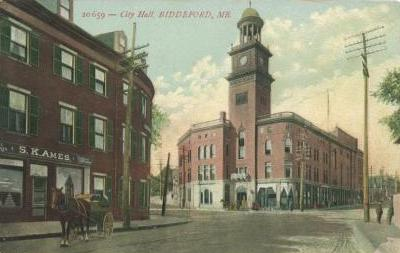
View of city hall building (right) in Biddeford, Maine, circa 1910s

- Daniel E. Somes, 1855-1856
- James Andrews, 1857
- Cyrus Gordon, 1858-1859
- Jonathan Tuck, 1860
- Esreff H. Banks, 1860
- Seth S. Fairfield, 1861-1862
- John Q. Adams, 1863-1864
- Charles A. Shaw, 1865-1866
- Ferguson Haines, 1867-1868
- James R. Clark, 1869
- E. W. Wedgewood, 1870-1871
- Francis G. Warren, 1872, 1874-1875
- James H. McMullan, 1873
- John H. Burnham, 1876
- Alfred Pierce, 1877
- Charles M. Moses, 1878, 1880
- James A. Strout, 1879
- Elisha E. Clark, 1881-1882
- E. W. Staples, 1883–1885, 1890-1893
- Samuel F. Parcher, 1886-1887
- C. E. Goodwin, 1888-1889
- Charles S. Hamilton, 1894-1895
- Carlos Heard, 1896-1897
- Levi W. Stone, 1898-1899
- Nathaniel B. Walker, 1900–1901, 1904-1905
- Joseph Gooch, 1902-1903
- Gilman P. Littlefield, 1906-1907
- Cornelius Horigan, 1908-1909
- Albert O. Marcille, 1910-1912
- James G. C. Smith, 1913-1915
- Leopold A. Girard, 1916
- Hartley C. Banks, 1917-1919
- Thomas F. Locke, 1920
- Ulysses E. Fosdick, 1921
- Edward H. Drapeau, 1922-1926
- George C. Precourt, ca.1926-1929
- Cornelius Horigan, ca.1930-1931
- Jerome A. Morin, ca.1932-1933
- George E. Beauchesne, ca.1934
- Arthur J. Remillard, ca.1935
- Frederick H. Mitchell, ca.1936
- Wilfred Landry, ca.1937-1940
- Louis B. Lausier, ca.1941-1944, 1953-1954
- Donna J. Dion, ca.2001-2003
- Wallace H. Nutting, 2003–2007
- Joanne Twomey, 2007–2011
- Alan Casavant, ca.2012
- Martin Grohman, ca.2024

== See also ==
- Biddeford history
