= Fred E. Davis Jr. =

American politician

Fred Davis Jr.

Member of the New Hampshire House of Representatives
- Incumbent
- Assumed office December 7, 2022
- Constituency: Hillsborough 3
- In office December 5, 2018 – December 4, 2020
- Constituency: Hillsborough 31

Personal details
- Party: Democratic
- Education: Biddeford High School

Military service
- Branch/service: United States Marine Corps

Fred E. Davis Jr. is a member of the New Hampshire House of Representatives.

== Education ==
Davis earned a high school diploma from Biddeford High School.

== Career ==
Davis served in the United States Marine Corps. Davis is a retired truck driver. Davis served as moderator for the 4th Ward of Nashua. On November 6, 2018, Davis was elected to the New Hampshire House of Representatives where he represented the Hillsborough 31 district. He assumed office on December 5, 2018. He is a Democrat. On September 8, 2020, Davis was defeated for re-election in the primary.

In 2022 was again elected to the House, now representing the Hillsborough 3 district.

== Personal life ==
Davis resides in Nashua, New Hampshire. Davis is divorced and has one child.
