= Justin Braun (ice hockey) =

American ice hockey player (born 1987)

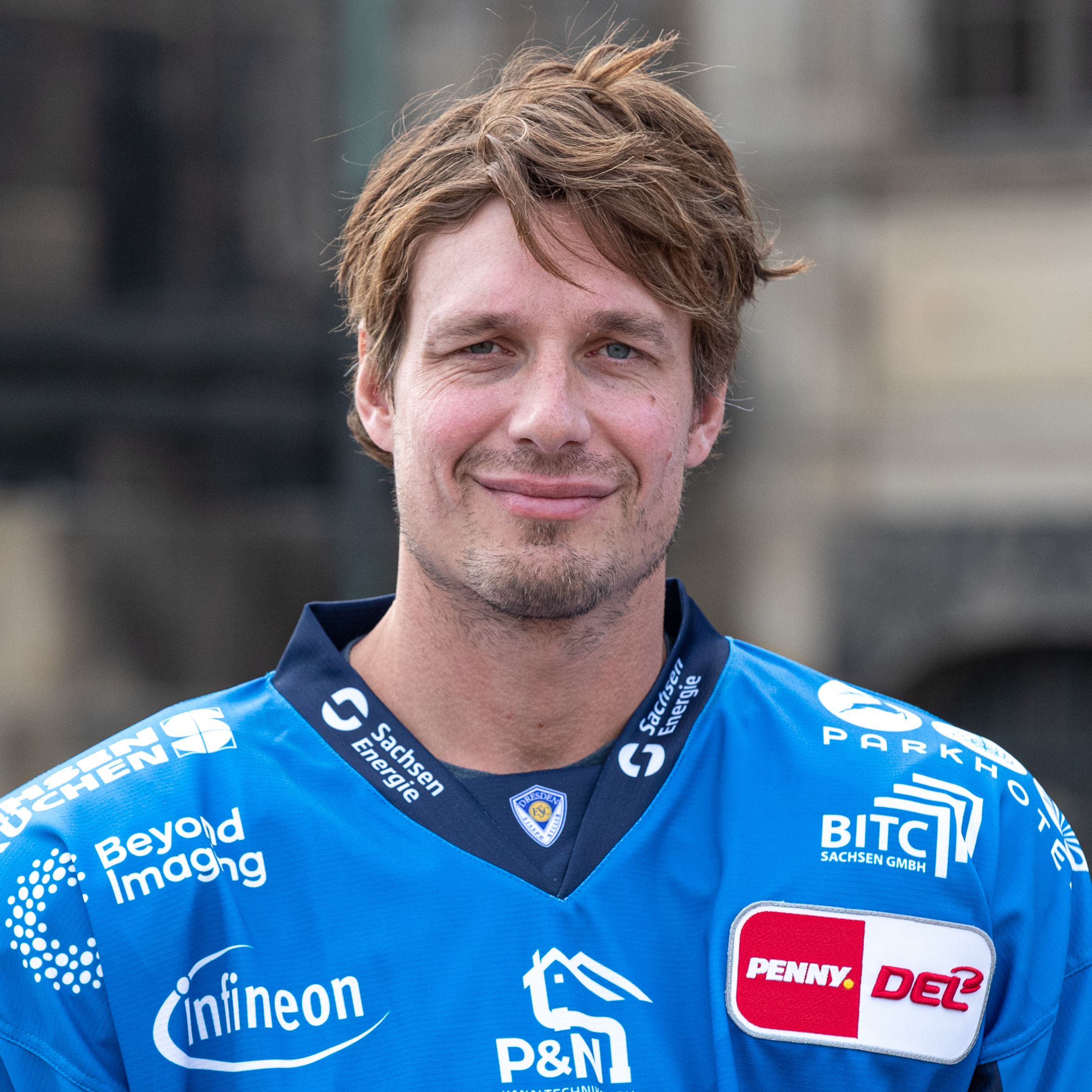
- Braun in 2025
- Born: February 10, 1987 (age 39) Vadnais Heights, Minnesota, U.S.
- Height: 6 ft 2 in (188 cm)
- Weight: 205 lb (93 kg; 14 st 9 lb)
- Position: Defense
- Shoots: Right
- DEL team Former teams: Straubing Tigers; San Jose Sharks; Tappara; Philadelphia Flyers; New York Rangers
- National team: United States
- NHL draft: 201st overall, 2007; San Jose Sharks
- Playing career: 2010–present

Justin Timothy Braun (born February 10, 1987) is an American professional ice hockey player currently under contract with the Straubing Tigers of the Deutsche Eishockey Liga (DEL). Braun was born in Saint Paul, Minnesota, and grew up nearby in White Bear Lake, Minnesota. He previously played for the San Jose Sharks, New York Rangers, and the Philadelphia Flyers of the National Hockey League (NHL).

== Playing career ==
=== Amateur ===
Braun was born in Vadnais Heights, Minnesota, and began playing ice hockey at the urging of his older brother, Eric. He attended White Bear Lake Area High School in White Bear Lake, Minnesota, making the varsity ice hockey team in his sophomore year. Braun helped lead White Bear to two state tournament appearances, including in 2005, when he served as team captain. After high school, he spent two seasons with the Green Bay Gamblers of the United States Hockey League (USHL), where he scored 13 points (two goals and 11 assists) across 69 games.

On May 24, 2006, the University of Massachusetts Amherst announced that Braun and five other players would join the UMass Minutemen ice hockey that fall. He scored his first college point on October 13, 2006, assisting Kevin Jarman in a 3–2 victory over the Sacred Heart Pioneers. His first collegiate goal came on January 27, against Boston University. At the end of the season, Braun was chosen as the Minutemen's Rookie of the Year, with four goals and seven assists, and was named to the Hockey East All-Rookie Team. Braun was selected in the seventh round, 201st overall, of the 2007 NHL entry draft by the San Jose Sharks of the National Hockey League (NHL).

=== Professional ===
In the 2010–11 season, Braun made his NHL debut November 26, 2010 against the Vancouver Canucks. His first point came the next night in a game against the Edmonton Oilers. His first NHL goal was in his fourth game, on December 2, 2010 against Pascal Leclaire of the Ottawa Senators. On October 4, 2013 against the Canucks, Braun scored his first goal since February 21, 2012, an 85-game stretch without a goal.

After completing his ninth season with San Jose in the 2018–19 season, on June 18, 2019, Braun was traded by the Sharks to the Philadelphia Flyers in exchange for a 2019 second round draft pick and 2020 third-round selection.

On October 5, 2020, Braun opted to forgo free agency, signing a two-year, $3.6 million contract extension with the Flyers.

During the 2021–22 season, with the Flyers out of playoff contention, Braun was traded to the New York Rangers in exchange for a 2023 third-round selection on March 21, 2022. Adding a dependable veteran presence to the blueline, Braun was a mainstay throughout the playoffs, registering 1 assist in 19 games to help the Rangers reach the Conference Finals.

A free agent from the Rangers, Braun returned to the Philadelphia Flyers, signing a one-year, $1 million contract on July 13, 2022. Braun initially announced his retirement from professional ice hockey on April 24, 2023. He appeared in 961 NHL games, recording 199 regular-season and 16 postseason points in the process.

After reconsidering his retirement, Braun opted to extend his playing career, signing a one-year contract with German club Straubing Tigers of the DEL on June 27, 2023.

== Personal life ==
Braun is married to Jessica Lysiak, a private chef, who is the daughter of former NHL All-star Tom Lysiak. She competed on Season 4 of the American version of the television show MasterChef in 2013, finishing in 3rd place. They have two daughters, Madison (born January 2016) and Summer Grace (born June 2021). He has two brothers, Eric and Bryan. His parents are Paul Braun and Carol Reamer.

== Career statistics ==
=== Regular season and playoffs ===
			Regular season					Playoffs
Season	Team	League	GP	G	A	Pts	PIM	GP	G	A	Pts	PIM
2003–04	White Bear Lake Area High School	HS-MN	—	—	—	—	—	—	—	—	—	—
2004–05	White Bear Lake Area High School	HS-MN	—	—	—	—	—	—	—	—	—	—
2004–05	Green Bay Gamblers	USHL	10	0	0	0	2	—	—	—	—	—
2005–06	Green Bay Gamblers	USHL	59	2	11	13	69	3	0	0	0	2
2006–07	UMass Minutemen	HE	39	4	10	14	20	—	—	—	—	—
2007–08	UMass Minutemen	HE	36	4	16	20	20	—	—	—	—	—
2008–09	UMass Minutemen	HE	39	7	16	23	50	—	—	—	—	—
2009–10	UMass Minutemen	HE	36	8	23	31	30	—	—	—	—	—
2009–10	Worcester Sharks	AHL	3	0	3	3	0	11	0	3	3	4
2010–11	Worcester Sharks	AHL	34	5	18	23	8	—	—	—	—	—
2010–11	San Jose Sharks	NHL	28	2	9	11	2	1	0	0	0	0
2011–12	Worcester Sharks	AHL	6	0	3	3	0	—	—	—	—	—
2011–12	San Jose Sharks	NHL	66	2	9	11	23	5	0	0	0	15
2012–13	Tappara	SM-l	6	0	3	3	2	—	—	—	—	—
2012–13	San Jose Sharks	NHL	41	0	7	7	6	11	0	1	1	0
2013–14	San Jose Sharks	NHL	82	4	13	17	20	7	1	1	2	7
2014–15	San Jose Sharks	NHL	70	1	22	23	48	—	—	—	—	—
2015–16	San Jose Sharks	NHL	80	4	19	23	36	24	2	5	7	6
2016–17	San Jose Sharks	NHL	81	4	9	13	28	6	0	1	1	0
2017–18	San Jose Sharks	NHL	81	5	28	33	28	10	0	1	1	4
2018–19	San Jose Sharks	NHL	78	2	14	16	35	20	0	1	1	8
2019–20	Philadelphia Flyers	NHL	62	3	16	19	18	16	0	2	2	2
2020–21	Philadelphia Flyers	NHL	53	1	5	6	18	—	—	—	—	—
2021–22	Philadelphia Flyers	NHL	61	5	11	16	36	—	—	—	—	—
2021–22	New York Rangers	NHL	8	1	1	2	0	19	0	1	1	6
2022–23	Philadelphia Flyers	NHL	51	0	2	2	19	—	—	—	—	—
2023–24	Straubing Tigers	DEL	52	7	19	26	12	8	1	0	1	0
2024–25	Straubing Tigers	DEL	51	3	15	18	14	7	0	3	3	2
NHL totals			842	34	165	199	317	119	3	13	16	48

=== International ===
Year	Team	Event	Result	GP	G	A	Pts	PIM
2012	United States	WC	7th	8	0	0	0	2
Senior totals				8	0	0	0	2

== Awards and honors ==
Award	Year
College
All-Hockey East Rookie Team	2006–07
All-Hockey East Second Team	2008–09
All-Hockey East First Team	2009–10
AHCA East Second-Team All-American	2009–10

Awards and achievements
Preceded by Louis Liotti	Hockey East Best Defensive Defenseman; 2009–10	Succeeded by Brian Dumoulin
