= 1950 Maine gubernatorial election =

- September 11, 1950
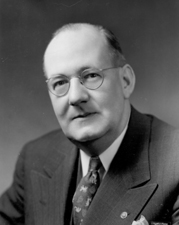

Nominee	Frederick G. Payne	Earl S. Grant
Party	Republican	Democratic
Popular vote	145,823	94,304
Percentage	60.73%	39.27%
- County results Payne: 50–60% 60–70% 70–80%
Governor before election
Frederick G. Payne
Republican
Elected Governor
Frederick G. Payne
Republican

The 1950 Maine gubernatorial election took place on September 11, 1950. Incumbent Republican Governor Frederick G. Payne was seeking a second term, and faced off against Democratic challenger Earl S. Grant and States Rights Democratic candidate Leland B. Currier, whom Grant had defeated in the regular Democratic primary. Payne went on to win re-election by a wide margin, while Currier received less than one percent of the vote.

== Republican primary ==
Payne was unopposed in the Republican primary.

== Democratic primary ==
=== Candidates ===
- Leland B. Currier, former state senator
- Earl S. Grant

=== Results ===
Democratic primary results
Party	Candidate	Votes	%
Democratic	Earl S. Grant	13,131	62.31
Democratic	Leland B. Currier	7,942	37.69
Total votes		21,073	100.00

== Results ==
1950 Gubernatorial Election, Maine
Party	Candidate	Votes	%	±%
Republican	Frederick G. Payne (incumbent)	145,823	60.73%	−
Democratic	Earl S. Grant	94,304	39.27%	−
States Rights Democratic	Leland B. Currier	1,050	0.43%	−
Majority		51,519	21.45%	

=== Counties that flipped from Democratic to Republican ===
- Androscoggin (largest city: Lewiston)
- York (largest town: Biddeford)
