= Wallace H. Nutting =

United States Army general (1928–2023)

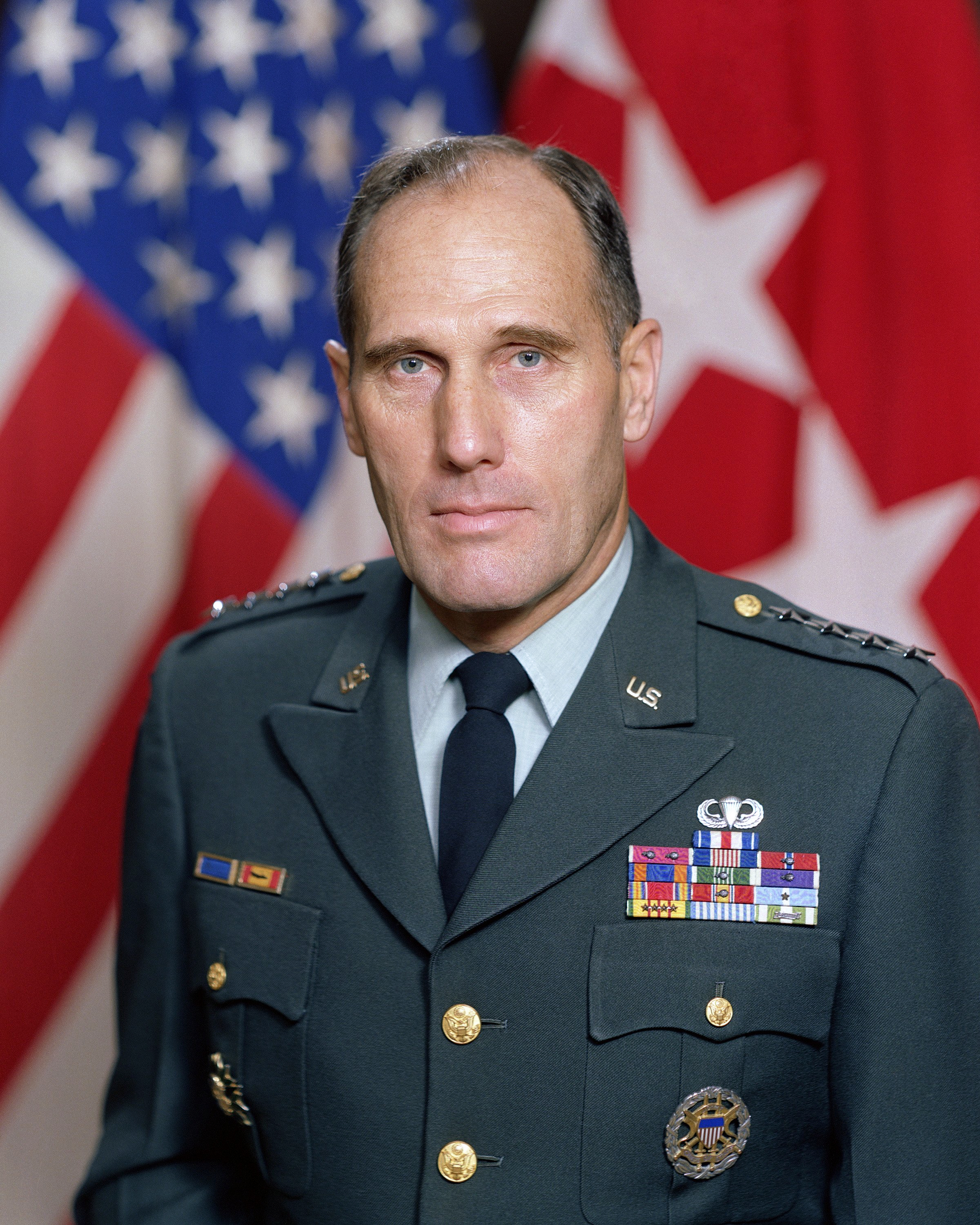
- Nutting in 1983
- Born: Wallace Hall Nutting; 3 June 1928; Newton, Massachusetts, U.S.
- Died: 17 August 2023 (aged 95); Saco, Maine, U.S.
- Military career
- Allegiance: United States of America
- Branch: United States Army
- Service years: 1950–1985
- Rank: General
- Commands: U.S. Readiness Command; U.S. Southern Command; 3rd Armored Division; 11th Armored Cavalry Regiment
- Conflicts: Korean War; Vietnam War
- Other work: Mayor of Biddeford, Maine

Wallace Hall Nutting (3 June 1928 – 17 August 2023) was a United States Army general who served as Commander in Chief, United States Southern Command (USCINCSOUTH) from 1979 to 1983 and as Commander in Chief, United States Readiness Command (USCINCRED) from 1983 to 1985.

== Early life ==
Nutting was born on 3 June 1928, in Newton, Massachusetts.

== Career ==
Nutting's military service began when he served in the Maine National Guard. After graduating from Phillips Exeter Academy in 1946, he received an appointment to the United States Military Academy, graduating in 1950 with a B.S. degree in military engineering. Nutting later received an M.A. degree in international affairs from George Washington University in 1963.

Nutting saw combat in the Korean War and served as a commander during two tours in the Vietnam War. He was awarded the Silver Star and the Soldier's Medal for his service in Korea, the latter for rescuing a wounded female Korean civilian from a minefield. Nutting also received two Purple Hearts for his service in Korea.

His commands include the 1st Squadron, 10th Cavalry, 4th Infantry Division in Vietnam; the 11th Armored Cavalry Regiment; the 3rd Armored Division; United States Southern Command from 1979 to 1983; and United States Readiness Command from 1983 to 1985.

== Later life ==
Nutting retired in 1985 and settled with his wife Jane in Biddeford, Maine, where he served as mayor from 2003 to 2007. Nutting has also served as a Senior Fellow at the Institute of Higher Defense Studies at the National Defense University and was an Associate Fellow at the Center for International Affairs at Harvard University. He was chairman of the University of Southern Maine's Senior College board.

On 28 May 2008, Nutting received the West Point Distinguished Graduate Award from the academy's Association of Graduates in a ceremony at West Point.

Wallace H. Nutting died in Saco, Maine, on 17 August 2023, at the age of 95.

== Controversies ==
In 1987 General Nutting denied Panamanian charges that, as CINCSOUTH, he had been complicit in the 1981 death of Manuel Noriega’s mentor General Omar Torrijos.

Nutting and two others were acquitted in 1993 after trial in the U. S. District Court in Tampa on charges Sooner Defense of Florida, Inc., had sold defective munitions for the Bradley fighting vehicle. He joined the company reluctantly, and was appointed its president two weeks before its bankruptcy. Six other codefendants were convicted. The charges had been brought in 1991.

== See also ==
- List of mayors of Biddeford, Maine
