= Saint Joseph's Church (Biddeford, Maine) =

Coordinates: 43°29′38″N 70°27′39″W

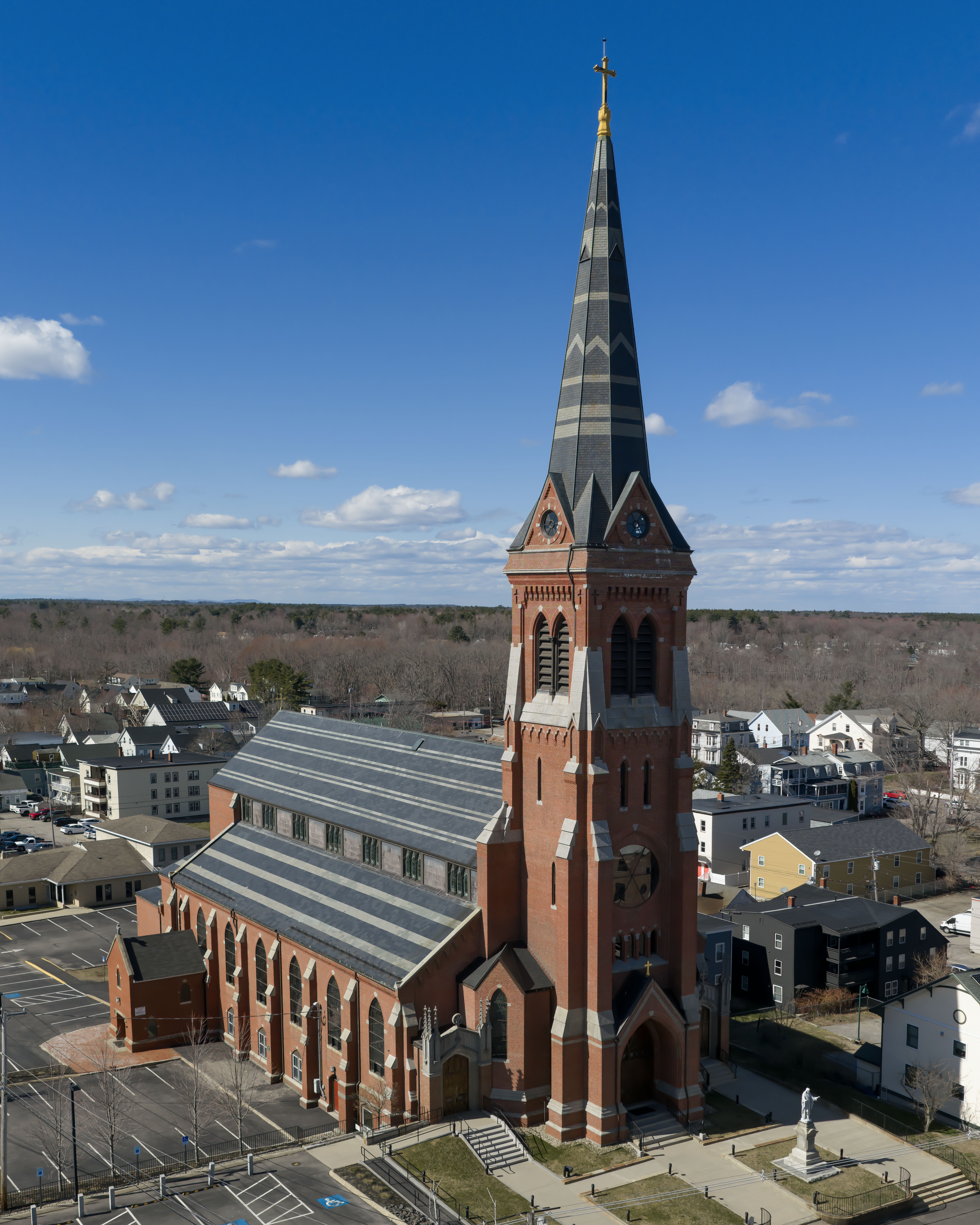
- Front view of the church
- Saint Joseph's Church
- Country: United States
- Denomination: Roman Catholic
- Website: www.goodshepherdparish.us

History
- Status: Church
- Founded: 13 May 1870
- Dedicated: 1883

Architecture
- Style: Neo-Gothic

Specifications
- Height: 235 feet (72 m)

Administration
- Diocese: Diocese of Portland
- Parish: Good Shepherd Parish

Clergy
- Bishop: Bishop James Ruggiere
- Priest(s): Fr. Timothy Nadeau (Pastor); Fr. Joseph Usunde; Fr. Felix Udulisa Lawir

Saint Joseph's Church is one of the 5 churches of Good Shepherd Parish located at 178 Elm Street in Biddeford, Maine. It is also the tallest building in Maine.

== History ==
The church was ordered from a decree from Bishop David W. Bacon of the Diocese of Portland to be made on May 13, 1870. The church was to be made for the influx of French-Canadian Roman Catholic immigrants coming from Quebec. The church was dedicated in 1883. The building is also known for its stained-glass windows, organ, art, and size. The church also had its own school, St. Joseph's School. The school was later merged, along with other schools, to the existing Saint James School, which is the only Catholic School under the Good Shepherd Parish.

== Description ==
The very entrance from the church begins with the narthex. In here, to the right and left are staircases to the choir loft. Immediately past this, there is a hallway to the right and a hallway to the left leading to the restrooms. Then, there is a set of doors into the nave. There is then 29 rows of pews. with four columns of each row (except the farthest on the left and right has only 24 rows). The ceiling and the walls next to the ceiling is adorned with 8 large murals depicting Jesus' life. The arches between the columns also contain patterns. The green carpet then leads into the sanctuary.

Immediately before the sanctuary, to the left, another staircase leads to the a side entrance and also Sainte Anne's Chapel in the basement. Before the sanctuary, to the right, is the choir section. Here, there are a: piano, a 3-manual Allen Organ console, and two rows of pews for choir members. The sanctuary, which is above the rest of the church, contains an altar, tabernacle, pulpit, lectern, and kneelers for lay readers and altar servers.

On the sides of the church are seven large stained-glass windows. Between each stained-glass window is two large stone sculpture attached to the wall, with each depicting a Station of the Cross.

The choir loft, which is above the narthex, houses an organ console, and also contains spare music, ladder to the belfry, and also all the pipes and reeds organ.

The organ was expanded and the pipes supplemented with digital voices in 2001, when the Allen Organ console was installed. The Church technically contains two organs, the console in the choir loft interfaces with the original pipes, including chimes. The Allen console contains both the electronic voices, with speakers located behind the tabernacle up front, as well as behind the pipes in the choir loft. The Allen console also interfaces with the pipe organ, allowing both organs to be played seamlessly.

== See also ==
- List of tallest buildings in Maine
