= Clifford McIntire =

American politician (1908–1974)

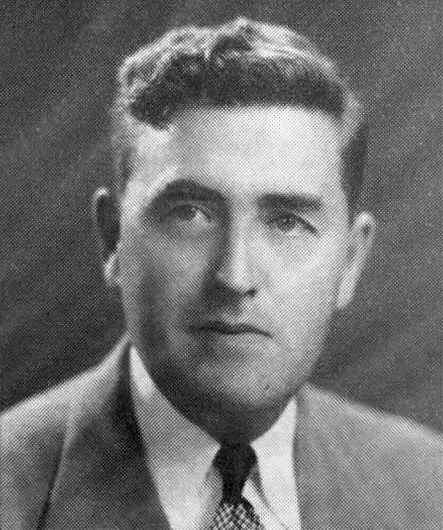

Member of the U.S. House of Representatives from Maine
- In office October 22, 1951 – January 3, 1965
- Preceded by: Frank Fellows
- Succeeded by: William Hathaway
- Constituency: 3rd district (1951-1963); 2nd district (1963-1965)

Personal details
- Born: May 4, 1908 Perham, Maine, U.S.
- Died: October 1, 1974 (aged 66) Bangor, Maine, U.S.
- Party: Republican

Clifford Guy McIntire (May 4, 1908 – October 1, 1974) was a member of the United States House of Representatives from Maine. He was born in Perham, Maine on May 4, 1908. After attending public schools, he was graduated from the University of Maine's College of Agriculture at Orono in 1930.

After graduating from college, he purchased a large farm, which he managed until 1952. McIntire worked in various roles for the Farm Credit Administration between 1933 and 1947, serving as an appraiser, supervisor, and regional manager. He became the assistant general manager of Maine Potato Growers, Inc., at Presque Isle, Maine from 1947 to 1951. McIntire was elected as a Republican to the Eighty-second Congress, by special election, October 22, 1951, to fill the vacancy caused by the death of Frank Fellows. He was reelected to the six succeeding Congresses and served from October 22, 1951, to January 3, 1965. McIntire voted in favor of the Civil Rights Acts of 1957, 1960, and 1964, as well as the 24th Amendment to the U.S. Constitution. He was not a candidate for reelection in 1964 but was instead an unsuccessful candidate for election to the Senate, losing to the popular Edmund Muskie by an overwhelming margin.

McIntire served as director of the American Farm Bureau Federation and was a member of Richard Nixon's Task Force on Rural Development between 1969 and 1970. He was appointed by President Gerald Ford in September 1974 to the newly created United States Railway Association. However, he died soon afterwards in Bangor, Maine, on October 1, 1974.

Party political offices
Preceded by Frederick G. Payne	Republican nominee for U.S. Senator from Maine (Class 1); 1964	Succeeded by Neil S. Bishop
U.S. House of Representatives
Preceded by Frank Fellows	Member of the U.S. House of Representatives from Maine's 3rd congressional district 1951–1963	Succeeded by District eliminated
Preceded by Stan Tupper	Member of the U.S. House of Representatives from Maine's 2nd congressional district 1963–1965	Succeeded by William Hathaway
