= Neil S. Bishop =

American dairy farmer, educator and politician (1903–1989)

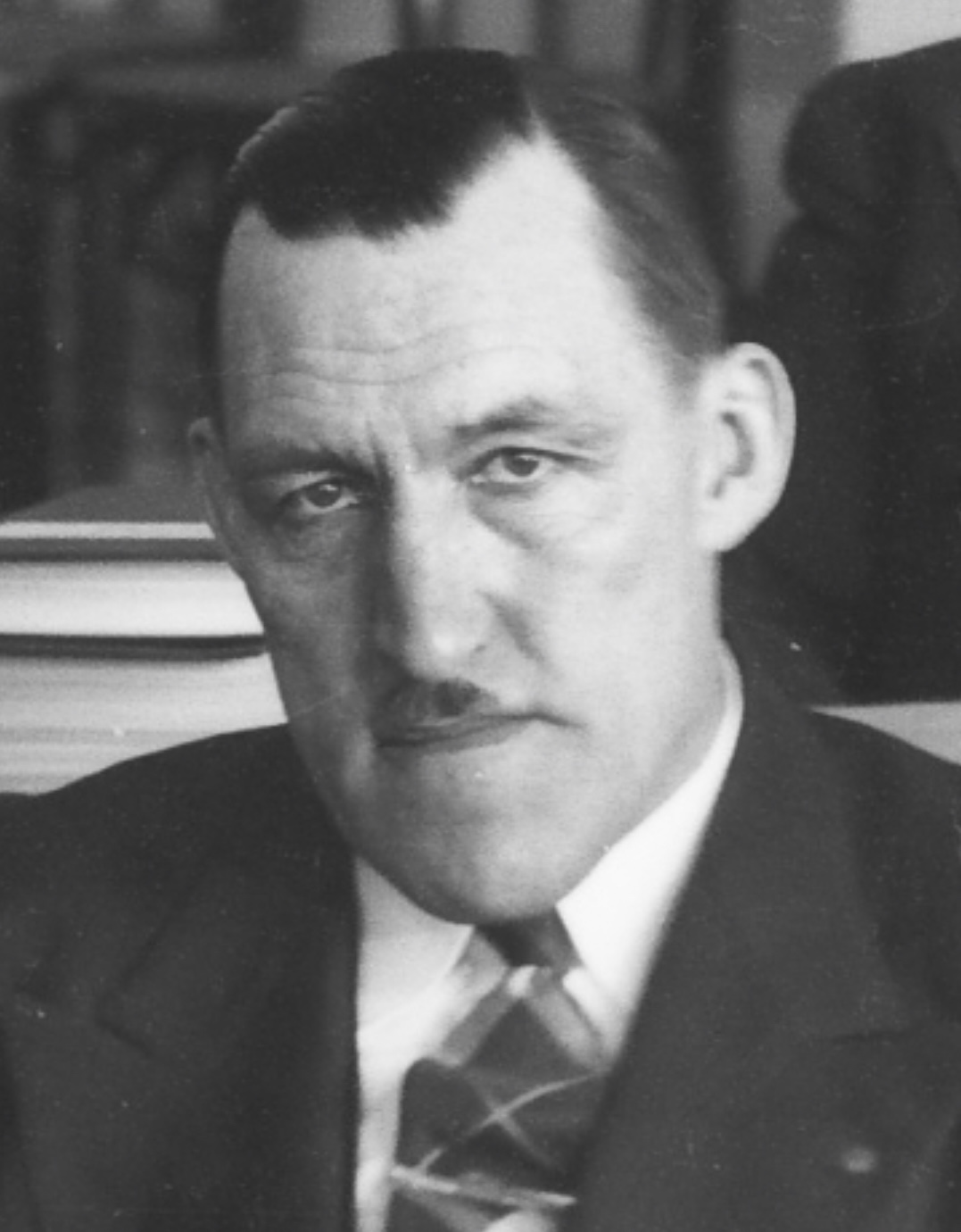
- Bishop in 1947

Member of the Maine Senate
- In office 1940–1948

Personal details
- Born: November 10, 1903 Presque Isle, Maine, U.S.
- Died: February 24, 1989 (aged 85) Beaufort, South Carolina, U.S.
- Party: Republican
- Occupation: dairy farmer, educator and politician

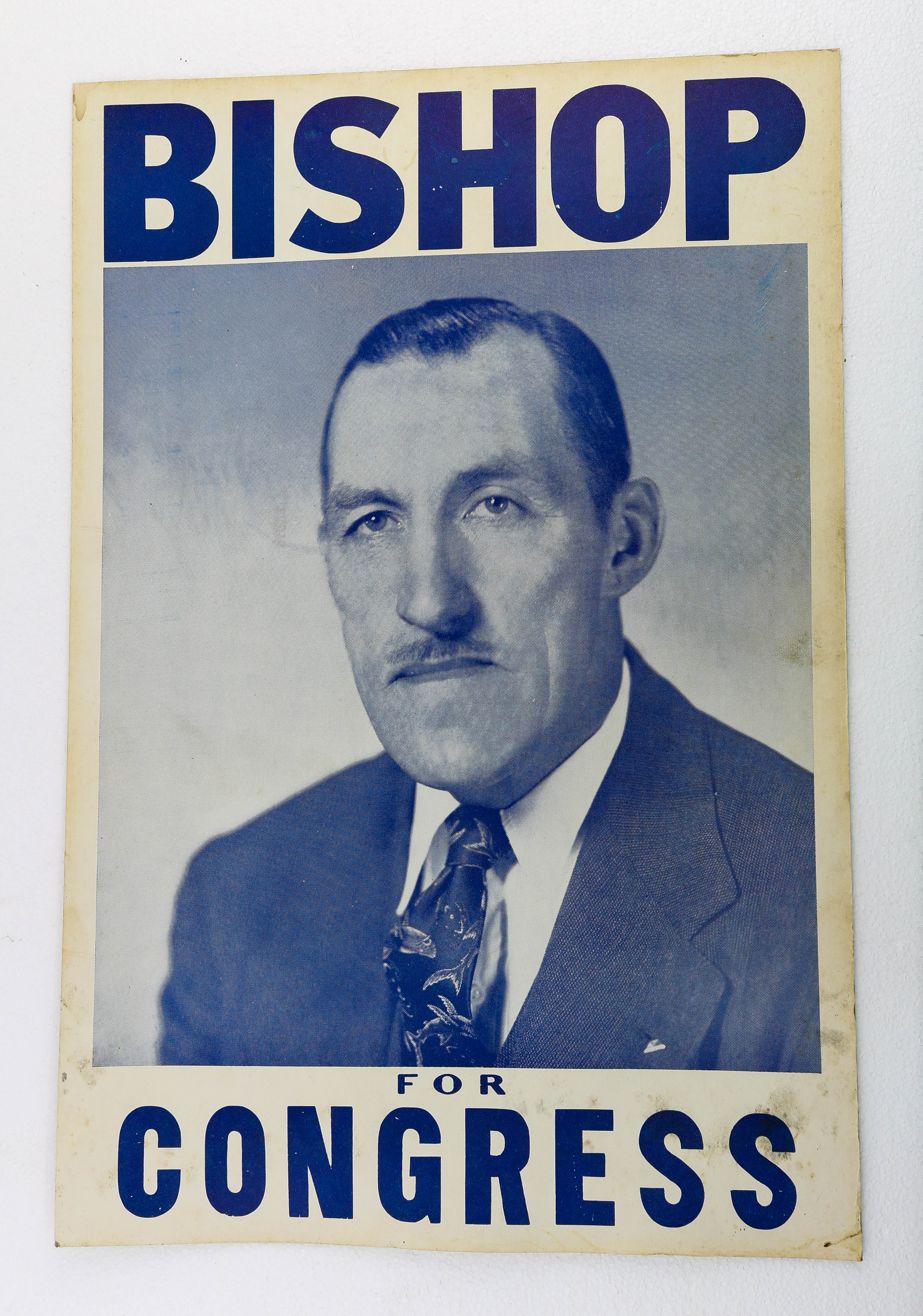

Neil S. Bishop (November 10, 1903 – February 24, 1989) was an American dairy farmer, educator and politician from Maine.

Bishop was born in Presque Isle, Maine, although his family moved when he was young to Bowdoinham, Maine. He served four terms (1940–1948) in the Maine Senate as a Republican while a resident of Bowdoinham. He unsuccessfully sought the Republican Party nomination for governor in 1948 and 1952. He contested the 1952 general election as an Independent Republican, but finished third with just 17% of the vote.

After moving to Stockton Springs, he won the nomination for Congress in the 2nd district in 1958, but lost to incumbent Democrat Frank M. Coffin. For several subsequent years, he taught at Augusta's Cony High School. In his final bid for public office, Bishop was his party's nominee for U.S. Senate in 1970, which he lost to incumbent Democrat Edmund Muskie. He had crossed party lines to support Muskie's longshot bid for The Blaine House in 1954.

Party political offices
Preceded by Clifford McIntire	Republican nominee for U.S. Senator from Maine (Class 1); 1970	Succeeded by Robert A. G. Monks
