= Renys =

Regional discount department store chain in Maine, United States

- Type: Private
- Industry: Retail
- Founded: October 6, 1949 (76 years ago)
- Founder: Robert H. Reny
- Headquarters: Newcastle, Maine, United States
- Number of locations: 19 (as of 2026)
- Key people: John Reny (president); Robert "Bob" Reny (vice-president); Faustine Reny; Adam Reny
- Products: Clothing, household goods, gifts, toys, food
- Number of employees: Over 600
- Website: renys.com

Renys is a family-owned department store chain operating in Maine, United States. The company was founded in 1949 by Robert H. Reny in Damariscotta and operates 19 locations throughout the state as of 2026. Renys specializes in selling closeout merchandise, production overruns and factory seconds from major brands at discounted prices.

== History ==
=== Founding and early years ===
Robert H. "R. H." Reny opened the first Renys store in Damariscotta, Maine, on October 6, 1949. The first winter proved challenging, with business so slow that R. H. had to sell merchandise door-to-door around the area using his old Hudson automobile to keep the store operational. This direct customer interaction helped him build relationships with local residents, who became loyal customers when they visited the store the following spring.

R. H.'s business philosophy centered on purchasing quality merchandise at discounted prices and passing those savings to customers at the lowest possible prices. This approach of buying production overruns, closeouts and factory seconds from major manufacturers became the company's defining business model.

=== Family succession ===
The company remained family-owned and operated through multiple generations. R. H.'s oldest son, John, joined the business in 1957 at age five, while his middle son, Bob, joined in 1959 at age seven. In 2004, the two sons officially took over operations of the chain.

The third generation of the family continued the tradition, with John's daughter Faustine joining the company in 2009 and Bob's son Adam joining in 2013. The family's involvement extends to spouses, with Mary Kate, Bob's wife, also participating in operations.

== Business model and operations ==
=== Merchandising strategy ===
Renys distinguishes itself through its purchasing strategy of acquiring small lots of high-quality brand merchandise at significant discounts. The company sources inventory through production overruns, closeouts, irregulars, and factory seconds from established manufacturers. This approach allows Renys to offer brand-name products including Carhartt, Columbia, Timberland, Smartwool, Chippewa, Bob's Red Mill and Lego at reduced prices.

The company maintained a pricing philosophy of offering consistent low prices without relying on promotional gimmicks such as coupons or frequent sales events. According to Mary Kate, this approach builds customer trust and avoids the confusion often associated with complex promotional pricing strategies.

=== Operations ===
Renys operates its headquarters and distribution center from Newcastle, Maine. The company's stores vary in size and layout, but maintain a consistent atmosphere and customer experience across locations. Each store is designed to provide what the company calls "A Maine Adventure," emphasizing the shopping experience as entertainment and discovery.

== Store locations ==
As of 2026, Renys operates 19 retail locations throughout Maine:

- Augusta
- Bangor (opened April 2024)
- Bath
- Belfast
- Bridgton
- Camden
- Damariscotta (two locations)
- Dexter
- Ellsworth
- Farmington
- Gardiner
- Madison
- Pittsfield
- Saco
- Topsham
- Waterville (opened April 2025)
- Wells
- Windham

=== Former locations ===
Renys previously operated a store in Fort Kent in Aroostook County, which served residents throughout the St. John Valley. The store, which had survived multiple floods from the St. John River and fire damage on two occasions, was permanently closed in September 1999 due to unsafe building conditions.

The company also operated a location in Portland between 2011 and 2025. In June 2025, Renys announced it would close the Portland location by the end of the year, citing post-pandemic sales decline and lease expiration as primary factors. The closure decision was also influenced by safety concerns related to increased incidents at the Congress Street location, as the area had experienced an uptick in drug use, loitering and other disturbances.

== Expansion ==
Despite challenges facing many retailers, Renys has pursued expansion in recent years. The company opened a new location in Bangor in April 2024, occupying a 31,000 square foot space in a former Christmas Tree Shops building. In April 2025, Renys opened its 18th store in Waterville in a former JCPenney location. Company president John Reny reported that the Bangor location was performing "exceptionally well" as of early 2025.

== Cultural impact ==
Renys has become deeply embedded in Maine culture, with its advertising slogan "Renys, a Maine Adventure" being widely recognized throughout the state. The company's jingle is familiar to most Maine residents, and the stores serve as community gathering places in many towns.

The company emphasizes the experiential aspect of shopping, with Mary Kate noting that customers frequently express love for the Renys experience in ways that distinguish it from larger retail chains. This emotional connection has helped the company maintain customer loyalty despite competition from national retailers.

== Media coverage and recognition ==
Renys received national attention in Fortune magazine's Small Business column as an example of a small retailer successfully competing against Walmart. The article highlighted how Renys management studied their larger competitor and identified clothing as an area where they could maintain a competitive advantage through their unique sourcing model.

The company has been featured in various Maine media outlets, including Down East magazine and the Portland Press Herald, often focusing on its role as a Maine institution and its family-owned business model.
