= St. Joseph's School (Biddeford, Maine) =

- U.S. National Register of Historic Places
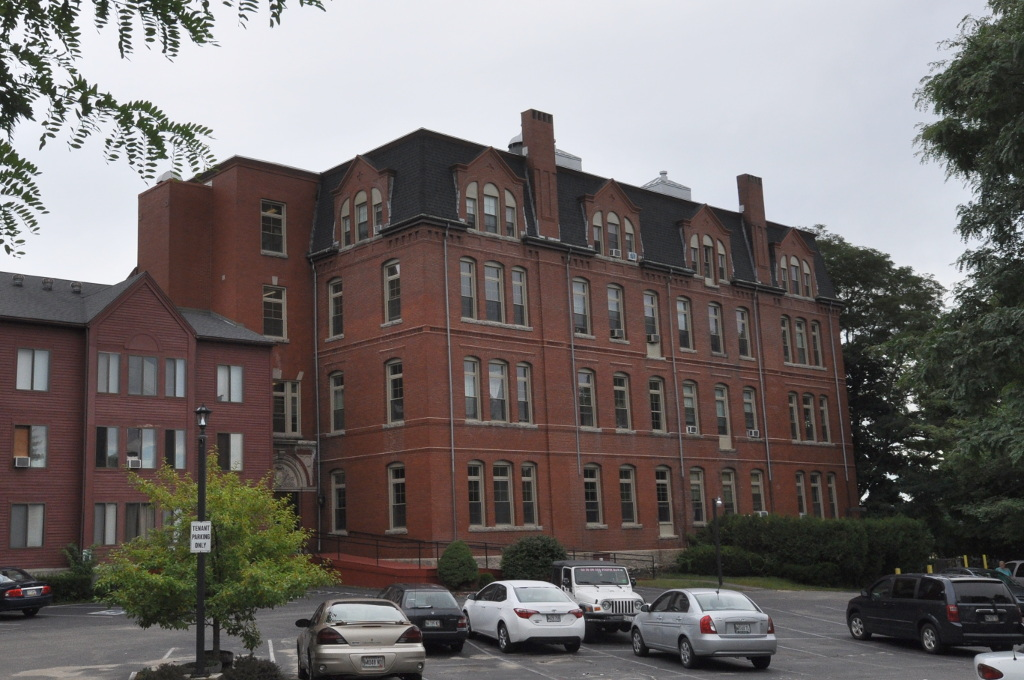

- Location within Maine Location within the United States
- Location: Birch St., Biddeford, Maine
- Coordinates: 43°29′25″N 70°27′31″W
- Area: 1 acre (0.40 ha)
- Built: 1887
- Architect: Bernier, Dr. Ferdinand
- Architectural style: Second Empire, Mansard
- NRHP reference No.: 83003708
- Added to NRHP: December 29, 1983

St. Joseph's School is a historic former school building on Birch Street in Biddeford, Maine. Built in 1887, it was one of the first large masonry schools to be built in the state, and became a focal point for the migration of French Canadians into the state. It was listed on the National Register of Historic Places in 1983. It has been converted to residential use.

== Description and history ==
The former St. Joseph's School is set in a residential area a few blocks south of Biddeford's central business district, on the north side of Birch Street, between Alfred and Graham Streets. It is a large 3-1/2 story brick building with a rectangular footprint and a full fourth story under a tall mansard roof. The roof is pierced by wall dormers featuring three-part round-arch windows topped by gablets. String courses separate the floors, and the window bays of the main (north-facing) facade are roughly grouped in threes. There is modest Romanesque brick corbelling at the eave. The main entrance is set in a 1916 brick stair tower at the northwestern end of the building.

Biddeford's textile mills saw an influx of both Irish and French Canadian migrants in the mid-19th century, resulting in the establishment first of the predominantly Irish Roman Catholic parish of St. Mary's, and then in 1870 of the establishment of St. Joseph's, which catered primarily to the French Canadian Catholic population. Parochial education first began in the basement of the St. Joseph's church, and the present school was built in 1888, to a design by Dr. Ferdinand Bernier, a parishioner. The school remained an anchor of the local French immigrant population well into the 1960s, with much of the curriculum taught in French. The building has been converted to residential use.

== See also ==
- National Register of Historic Places listings in York County, Maine
