= Frederick G. Payne =

American politician (1904–1978)

Frederick George Payne
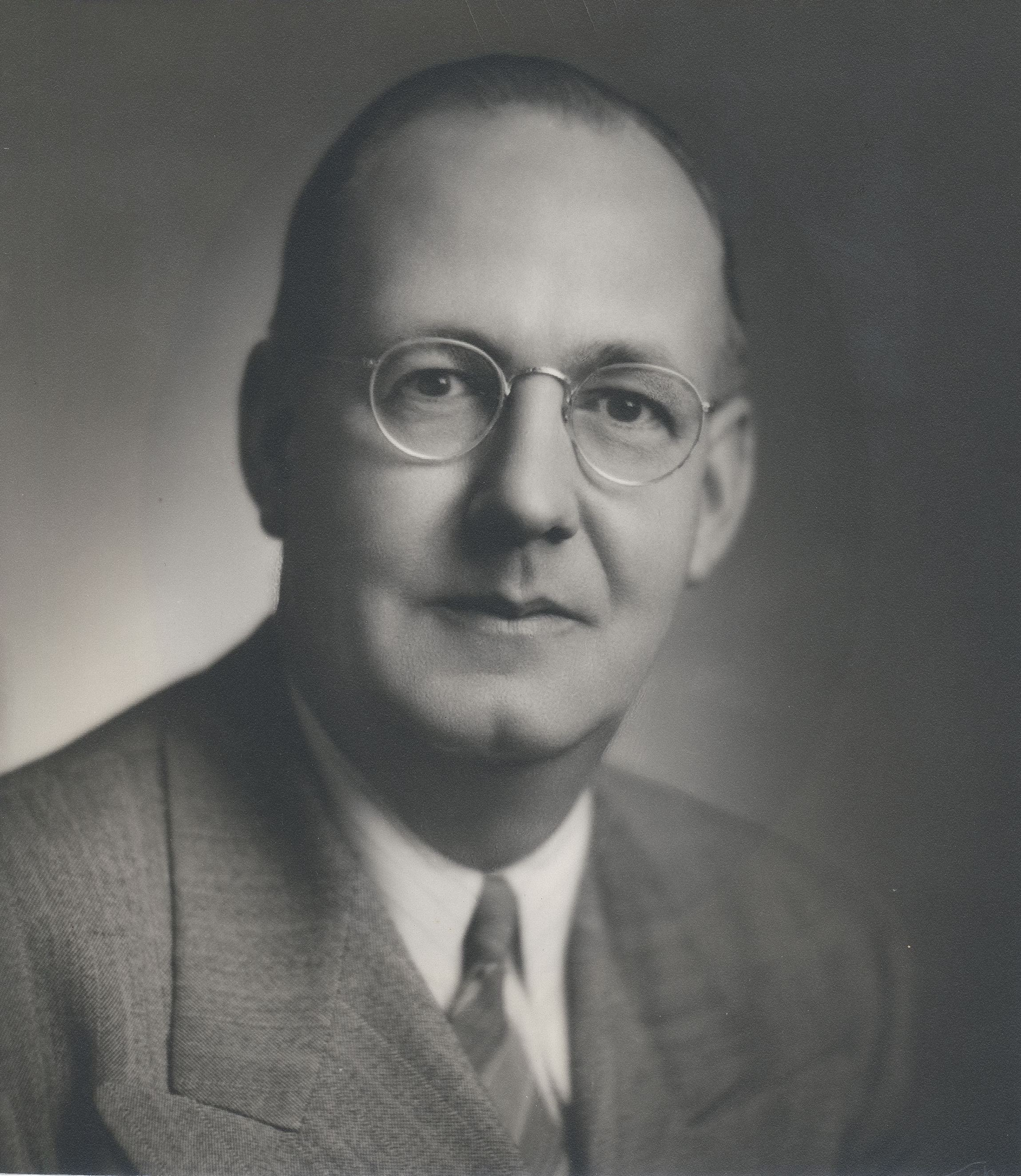
- Portrait of Payne, c. 1949 - 1952

United States Senator from Maine
- In office January 3, 1953 – January 3, 1959
- Preceded by: Owen Brewster
- Succeeded by: Edmund Muskie

60th Governor of Maine
- In office January 5, 1949 – December 24, 1952
- Preceded by: Horace Hildreth
- Succeeded by: Burton M. Cross

Personal details
- Born: July 24, 1904 Lewiston, Maine, U.S.
- Died: June 15, 1978 (aged 73) Waldoboro, Maine, U.S.
- Party: Republican
- Education: Bentley College

Military service
- Allegiance: United States
- Branch/service: United States Army Air Forces
- Years of service: 1942 – 1945
- Rank: Lieutenant Colonel
- Battles/wars: World War II

Frederick George Payne (July 24, 1904 – June 15, 1978) was an American businessman and politician. A member of the Republican Party, he served as a U.S. senator from Maine from 1953 to 1959. He previously served as the 60th governor of Maine from 1949 to 1952.

== Early life and education ==
Frederick Payne was born in Lewiston, Maine, to Frederick and Nellie (née Smart) Payne. He received his early education at public schools in his native city, graduating from Jordan High School. As a child, he worked as a newsboy, grocery clerk, theater usher, and dishwasher. He studied at the Bentley School of Accounting and Finance in Boston, Massachusetts, graduating in 1925.

== Early business and political career ==
Payne then worked as a financial manager and chief disbursing officer for the Maine & New Hampshire Theaters Company, which operated 132 movie theaters in New England. He began his political career as mayor of Augusta, serving from 1935 to 1941. In 1940, he unsuccessfully ran for the Republican nomination for Governor of Maine, losing to state senator Sumner Sewall. After Sewall was elected governor, he named Payne as the state finance commissioner and budget director. He resigned in 1942 in order to serve with the U.S. Air Force during World War II, reaching the rank of a lieutenant colonel. Following his military service, he worked as manager of Waldoboro Garage Company from 1945 to 1949.

== Governor of Maine ==
In 1948, Payne was elected the 60th governor of Maine after defeating his Democratic opponent, Biddeford mayor Louis Lausier, by a margin of 66%-34%. He was later re-elected in 1950, defeating Democrat Earl Grant by 61% to 39%. During his tenure, he created a two-percent sales tax, expanded the Maine Development Commission, and began a long-range highway modernization program financed by a $27 million bond issue.

During Payne's second term as governor, he was accused of accepting a bribe involving the state liquor industry. A wine bottler claimed he paid $12,000 to a Boston promotion man for the latter's supposed influence with Payne and the state liquor chairman. However, after testifying before a special investigating committee, Payne was cleared of all charges.

== United States Senator ==
In 1952, Payne was elected to the U.S. Senate. He defeated incumbent senator Owen Brewster in the Republican primary, and went on to defeat Democrat Roger P. Dube in the general election.

During the late 1950s, after a series of lurid magazine articles and Hollywood films helped to sensationalize youth gangs and violence, Payne supported legislation to ban automatic-opening or switchblade knives. During congressional hearings, Payne suggested that he believed immigrants to be the source of gang violence: "Isn't it true that this type of knife, switchblade knife, in its several different forms, was developed, actually, abroad, and was developed by the so-called scum, if you want to call it, or the group who are always involved in crime?" The ban on switchblade knives was eventually enacted into law as the Switchblade Knife Act of 1958. Senator Payne and other congressmen supporting the Switchblade Knife Act believed that by stopping the importation and interstate sales of automatic knives (effectively halting sales of new switchblades), the law would reduce youth gang violence by blocking access to what had become a symbolic weapon. However, while switchblade imports, domestic production, and sales to lawful owners soon ended, later legislative research demonstrated that youth gang violence rates had in fact rapidly increased, as gang members turned to firearms instead of knives. Payne did not vote on the Civil Rights Act of 1957.

Payne Lost re-election in 1958 to Democratic Governor Ed Muskie. by 61,182 votes

== Death ==
He died in 1978 in Waldoboro, Maine, aged 73. He is buried in Waldoboro's German Lutheran Cemetery.

== See also ==
- List of mayors of Augusta, Maine

Party political offices
Preceded by Horace Hildreth	Republican nominee for Governor of Maine; 1948, 1950	Succeeded by Burton M. Cross
Preceded by Owen Brewster	Republican nominee for U.S. Senator from Maine (Class 1); 1952, 1958	Succeeded by Clifford McIntire
Political offices
Preceded by Horace Hildreth	Governor of Maine; 1949–1952	Succeeded by Burton M. Cross
U.S. Senate
Preceded by Owen Brewster	U.S. senator (Class 1) from Maine; 1953–1959; Served alongside: Margaret Chase Smith	Succeeded by Edmund Muskie
