= Pascal P. Gilmore =

American politician (1845–1931)

Maine State Treasurer
- In office 1907–1911
- Preceded by: Ormandel Smith
- Succeeded by: James F. Singleton

Personal details
- Born: June 24, 1845 Dedham, Maine, U.S.
- Died: December 5, 1931 (aged 86) Bucksport, Maine, U.S.
- Resting place: Brookside Cemetery; Dedham, Maine, U.S.
- Party: Republican
- Spouse: Alma M. Hart (m. 1881)
- Relations: Raymond Fellows (son-in-law)
- Children: Madge (Gilmore) Fellows
- Occupation: Lumber inspector Farmer; Conveyancer; Bank president

Military service
- Branch/service: Union Army
- Years of service: 1864–1865
- Rank: Corporal
- Battles/wars: Hatcher's Run; White Oak Road; Five Forks

Pascal Pearl Gilmore (June 24, 1845 – December 5, 1931) was an American politician who was Maine State Treasurer from 1907 to 1911.

== Early life ==
Gilmore was born in Dedham, Maine, on June 24, 1845, to Tyrel and Mary W. (Pearl) Gilmore. He was educated in the local common schools and at the East Maine Conference Seminary.

== Military service ==
Gilmore served in the Union Army during the American Civil War. He enlisted in the 16th Maine Infantry Regiment on September 5, 1864. He was wounded during the Battle of Hatcher's Run, promoted for gallant and meritorious conduct in the battles White Oak Road and Five Forks, and was present during surrender of Robert E. Lee at Appomattox Court House.

== Business ==
From 1867 to 1871, Gilmore was a lumber inspector in Michigan. He then returned to Maine, where he worked as a farmer and conveyancer until 1891. He was president of Bucksport National Bank for sixteen years and a director for twenty-five.

== Politics ==
Gilmore was a chairman of the Dedham board of selectmen for ten years and was the town's superintendent of schools for fifteen years. He was a member of the Maine House of Representatives in 1875 and 1883 and the Maine Senate in 1891. In 1891, he was appointed to the state liquor commission by governor Edwin C. Burleigh.

From 1907 to 1911, Gilmore was Maine State Treasurer. On April 12, 1912, he was indicted on fifteen counts of embezzlement involving $10,573 of state funds. Later that month, he pleaded nolo contendere to one count and paid a fine of $1,025. The remaining charges were dismissed.

== Personal life and death ==
On October 25, 1881, Gilmore married Alma M. Hart in Holden, Maine. They had one daughter, Madge, who was the wife of Maine Attorney General Raymond Fellows.

Gilmore died on December 5, 1931 at his home in Bucksport, Maine.
