= Oscar F. Fellows =

Politician from Maine, United States

Member of the Maine House of Representatives
- In office 1901–1904

Personal details
- Born: Oscar Fowler Fellows; September 10, 1857 Bucksport, Maine, US
- Died: December 18, 1921 (aged 64) Bucksport, Maine, US
- Party: Republican
- Spouse: Eva Marie Fling (m. 1883; died 1921)
- Children: Raymond; Frank
- Profession: Attorney

Oscar Fowler Fellows (September 10, 1857 – December 18, 1921) was an American attorney and Republican politician from Bucksport, Maine. He served in the Maine House of Representatives from 1901 to 1904 and was elected speaker Speaker of the Maine House of Representatives during his second term.

== Early life and education ==
Oscar Fowler Fellows was born on September 10, 1857, in Bucksport, Maine.

Fellows studied law under Bucksport attorney Lewis Wells Fling, and was admitted to the Maine State Bar in 1881.

== Legal and political career ==
Fellows served two terms in the Maine House of Representatives from 1901 to 1904, representing the Republican Party. In 1903, he was elected Speaker of the House.

As an attorney, Fellows served as president of the Maine State Bar Association. He was associated with the Bangor law firm Fellows & Fellows. He also served as a member of the International Commission Pertaining to the St. John River.

== Personal life and death ==
Fellows married Eva Marie Fling, daughter of Lewis Wells Fling, under whom he had studied law, on May 24, 1883. Together they had two sons, Raymond Fellows and Frank Fellows. Raymond served as Maine Attorney General from 1925 to 1928 and later as chief justice of the Maine Supreme Judicial Court. Frank represented Maine's 3rd congressional district in the United States House of Representatives from 1941 until his death in 1951.

Fellows died on December 18, 1921, at the age of 64.
