= Alexander A. LaFleur =

American politician (1898–1980)

Maine Attorney General
- In office 1951–1955
- Preceded by: Ralph W. Farris
- Succeeded by: Frank F. Harding

Personal details
- Born: May 29, 1898 Marlborough, Massachusetts, U.S.
- Died: March 13, 1980 (aged 81) Chapel Hill, North Carolina, U.S.
- Resting place: Evergreen Cemetery; Portland, Maine, U.S.
- Party: Republican
- Spouse: Marjorie F. French
- Children: 2
- Education: Colby College; George Washington University Law School
- Occupation: Attorney

Alexander Arthur LaFleur (May 29, 1898 – March 13, 1980) was an American attorney and politician who was Maine Attorney General from 1951 to 1955.

== Early life ==
LaFleur was born in Marlborough, Massachusetts on May 29, 1898. He was the eighth child of a Baptist minister and grew up in Waterville, Maine.

LaFleur enlisted in the United States Army November 1917 and served with the 257th Aero Squadron during World War I. In March 1918, he was promoted to Sergeant first class. He served overseas from June 1918 until April 1919. He was discharged on April 17, 1919.

LaFleur graduated from Colby College in 1920 and George Washington University Law School in 1923. In 1925, he opened a law office in Portland, Maine.

== Early political career ==
LaFleur was secretary of the Maine Legislature committee on judiciary in 1935. In 1938, he was elected to the Maine House of Representatives. He was chairman of the military affairs committee and a member of the public utilities, inland fish and game, and legal affairs committees. He sponsored legislation to reactivate the Maine State Guard. He resigned in 1941 to become an assistant attorney general.

== World War II ==
LaFleur resigned in 1942 to rejoin the United States Army. He was commissioned a captain in the Judge Advocate General's Corps and was assigned to the 10th Armored Division. He was promoted to major in 1942, lieutenant colonel in 1943, and colonel in 1946. He served throughout Europe and was present with the Third United States Army at the Battle of the Bulge.

== Attorney general ==
In 1947, Lafleur was elected state commander of the American Legion. He pledged to not get involved in politics during his term as commander.

In 1949, LaFleur was a candidate for Maine Attorney General. He and John G. Marshall challenged incumbent Ralph W. Farris, who had broken precedent by seeking a third term. At the Republican legislative caucus, none of the candidates were able to obtain a majority on the first ballot (Farris had 67 votes, LaFleur had 64, and Marshall had 18), but Farris was able to secure victory on the second ballot, receiving 76 votes to LaFleur's 69 and Marshall's 3.

Farris and LaFleur faced off again in 1951. This time, LaFleur won 82 votes to 70. He went on to defeat Democrat F. Davis Clark 147 votes to 25. He was reelected in 1953. He won the Republican nomination in a three-way contest, receiving 93 votes to judge Alonzo Conant's 33 and senator Frank F. Harding's 30. He did not seek a third term in 1955, although he was open to be drafted.

== Gubernatorial campaign ==
On November 30, 1955, LaFleur announced his candidacy in the 1956 Maine gubernatorial election. His campaign was managed by retired brigadier general Frank Edward Lowe. He finished a distant third place in the Republican primary behind Speaker of the Maine House of Representatives Willis A. Trafton, Jr. and state senator Philip F. Chapman, Jr.

== Death ==
LaFleur spent his later years in Chapel Hill, North Carolina. He died on March 13, 1980 at North Carolina Memorial Hospital.
