= Clyde R. Chapman =

American attorney and politician (1874–1951)

Maine Attorney General
- In office 1933–1937
- Preceded by: Clement F. Robinson
- Succeeded by: Franz U. Burkett

Mayor of Belfast, Maine
- In office 1930–1933
- Preceded by: Foster C. Small
- Succeeded by: E. Copeland Lang

Personal details
- Born: July 23, 1889 Fairfield, Maine, U.S.
- Died: March 6, 1978 (aged 88) Belfast, Maine, U.S.
- Resting place: Maplewood Cemetery; Fairfield, Maine, U.S.
- Party: Republican
- Spouse: Eva May Humphrey (m. 1919)
- Children: 1
- Education: Bowdoin College; University of Maine School of Law
- Occupation: Attorney

Clyde Raymond Chapman (July 23, 1889 – March 6, 1978) was an American attorney and politician who was Maine Attorney General from 1933 to 1937.

== Early life ==
Chapman was born in Fairfield, Maine, on July 23, 1889, to George Mansur Chapman and Laura Evelyn (Keene) Chapman. He graduated from the Coburn Classical Institute, earned a bachelor's degree from Bowdoin College in 1912, and attained a bachelor of laws degree from the University of Maine School of Law in 1917. On February 24, 1919, he married Eva May Humphrey in Augusta, Maine. They had one son – Gordon C. Chapman.

== Career ==
Chapman was admitted to the bar in 1918 and worked for the firm of Williams, Burleigh, & McLean until 1919, when he started his own practice in Belfast, Maine.

From 1919 to 1933, Chapman was clerk of the Maine House of Representatives. In 1919, he was appointed judge of the Belfast municipal court by governor Carl Milliken. Chapman's term ended in 1923 and he was not reappointed by governor Percival P. Baxter. Chapman was Belfast's city solicitor in 1923. From 1925 to 1933, he was Waldo County attorney. From 1930 to 1933, he was mayor of Belfast.

In 1933, Chapman was elected Maine Attorney General. He defeated Hugh W. Hastings and Frank E. Southard for the Republican nomination and was elected by the Republican majority in the Maine Legislature. He was reelected in 1935, receiving 113 votes to Democratic nominee Joseph E. F. Connelly's 61. In 1936, he was the lead prosecutor in the trial of Reuben Brewer, who was charged with the murder of his wife, Dolda Medina Brewer. Brewer was found guilty and sentenced to life in prison after his request for a new trial was denied by the Maine Supreme Judicial Court.

Chapman did not run for reelection in 1937 and returned to his practice in Belfast. In 1938, he was co-counsel for Francis M. Carroll, an Oxford County deputy sheriff who was charged with murdering Dr. James G. Littlefield. Littlefield's body had been found in the car of Paul N. Dwyer, the 18-year old boyfriend of Carroll's daughter. Dwyer pleaded guilty to the crime and was serving a life sentence, but while in prison, contended that Carroll had actually committed the murder to cover up an insectuous relationship between him and his daughter. Carroll was found guilty and both he and Dwyer remained in prison for the same crime until 1950, when another attorney, Stanley M. Bird, was able to have Carroll released on a habeas corpus petition. In 1943, he was the attorney for Avies Clark, a Belfast woman who pleaded guilty to manslaughter in the death of her new born infant, who was found concealed in a bureau drawer in the Augusta State Hospital, where she was an employee.

== Death ==
Chapman died on March 6, 1978 in Belfast.
