= Attorney General Baker =

Attorney General Baker may refer to:

- Blake Baker, Attorney General of North Carolina
- John Baker (1488–1558), Attorney General for England and Wales
- Orville D. Baker (1847–1908), Attorney General of Maine
- Richard Chaffey Baker (1842–1911), Attorney-General of South Australia
- Thurbert Baker (born 1952), Attorney General of Georgia
