= Senator Burkett (disambiguation) =

Elmer Burkett (1867–1935) was a U.S. Senator from Nebraska from 1905 to 1911. Senator Burkett may also refer to:

- Franz U. Burkett (1887–1961), Maine State Senate
- Mike Burkett (politician) (born 1948), South Dakota State Senate

== See also ==
- Frank Burkitt (1843–1914), Mississippi State Senate
