= Frank I. Cowan =

American attorney and politician (1888–1948)

Maine Attorney General
- In office 1941–1945
- Preceded by: Franz U. Burkett
- Succeeded by: Ralph W. Farris

Personal details
- Born: May 20, 1888 Palmyra, Maine, U.S.
- Died: February 23, 1948 (aged 59) Portland, Maine, U.S.
- Resting place: Pine Grove Cemetery; Falmouth, Maine, U.S.
- Party: Republican
- Spouse: Helen Caspar (m. 1913)
- Children: 3
- Education: Bowdoin College; University of Maine School of Law
- Occupation: Teacher; Lawyer

Frank Irving Cowan (May 20, 1888 – February 23, 1948) was an American lawyer and politician who was Maine Attorney General from 1941 to 1945.

== Early life ==
Cowan was born in Palmyra, Maine, on May 20, 1888, to Lewville and Fannie (Woodworth) Cowan. He graduated from the Maine Central Institute and earned a bachelor's degree from Bowdoin College in 1913. He taught at Newton Technical High School in Newton, Massachusetts from 1913 to 1914 and the Calais Academy in Calais, Maine from 1914 to 1915. On October 11, 1913, he married Helen A. Caspar in Dover, New Hampshire. They had three sons.

== Legal career ==
In 1918, Cowan earned his bachelor of laws degree from the University of Maine School of Law. He was admitted to the bar that same year. He was associated with the firm of Woodman & Whitehouse until 1921. He then practiced alone until 1925, when he formed a partnership with his brother, Walter A. Cowan.

== Business career ==
From 1935 to 1940, Cowan was president of the State Mutual Fire Insurance Company. He was also a director of the Aroostook Mutual Fire Insurance Company.

== Politics ==
Cowan was a member of the Portland City Council from 1920 to 1921 and was council president in 1921. From 1926 to 1931, he was recorder of the Portland municipal court. In 1931, he was appointed by governor William Tudor Gardiner to investigate state trust funds. Cowan was able to have nearly $1 million returned to the state. From 1939 to 1941, Cowan was a member of the Maine House of Representatives.

== Attorney general ==
In 1941, Cowan was one of three candidates who challenged incumbent Franz U. Burkett for the Republican nomination for Maine Attorney General. Cowan led on the first ballot with 64 votes to Percy T. Clarke's 34, Frank A. Tirrell's 30, and Burkett's 24. He won the nomination on the next ballot with 93 votes to Clarke's 35, Tirrell's 19, and Burkett's 4. The Republicans had a majority in the Maine Legislature and elected Cowan over the Democratic nominee, F. Harold Dubord.

In 1941, Cowan prosecuted Merrill E. Joss for murder of his wife, Luverne. Joss was found guilty of the lesser charge of manslaughter. Later that year, Cowan prosecuted Fred G. Wheeler, a wealthy cattle dealer from Farmington, Maine, was accused of murdering Florence Buzzell, a woman thirty years his junior he was having an affair with. Wheeler's defense argued Buzzell's death was a suicide, not a murder. Wheeler was found not guilty. In 1943, he tried John F. Ingalls for the 1938 robbery and murder of Eben Kingsbury. Ingalls was found not guilty.

In 1944, Cowan issued a report critical of the conditions at the Augusta State Hospital following the death of a patient. The report led the state commissioner of institutions to hire a medical consultant to study the facility.

Cowan declined to seek a third term in 1945.

== Later life ==
Upon leaving office, Cowan formed a partnership with his son Caspar. He practiced law until his death on February 23, 1948.
