= Ralph W. Farris =

American lawyer and politician (1886–1968)

Maine Attorney General
- In office 1945–1951
- Preceded by: Frank I. Cowan
- Succeeded by: Alexander A. LaFleur

Mayor of Augusta, Maine
- In office January 4, 1943 – January 18, 1943
- Preceded by: Sanford L. Fogg Jr.
- Succeeded by: Levi T. Williams

Personal details
- Born: June 1, 1886 Rockland, Maine, U.S.
- Died: April 2, 1968 (aged 81) Augusta, Maine, U.S.
- Resting place: Forest Grove Cemetery; Augusta, Maine, U.S.
- Party: Republican
- Spouse: Lillian Essancy (m. 1917)
- Children: 3
- Education: Willamette University College of Law
- Occupation: Lawyer

Ralph Webster Farris Sr. (June 1, 1886 – April 2, 1968) was an American lawyer and politician who was Maine Attorney General from 1945 to 1951.

== Early life ==
Farris was born in Rockland, Maine, on June 1, 1886, to Henry and Alice (Webster) Farris. He earned his bachelor of laws from the Willamette University College of Law in 1914, then worked as a newspaper reporter in New York City. On March 1, 1917, he married Lillian Essancy in Augusta, Maine. They had two sons and a daughter. One son, Ralph Jr., was Kennebec County attorney.

== Career ==
Farris was admitted to the bar in 1917 and practiced with the office of Andrews & Nelson in Augusta until 1918, when he opened his own office. During World War I, he was a legal advisor to the Augusta Selective Service board.

Farris was a member of the Maine House of Representatives from 1929 to 1935 and was the Republican floor leader during his final term. In 1934, he was a candidate for the United States House of Representatives in Maine's 2nd congressional district. He finished second in the six-candidate Republican primary behind Zelma M. Dwinal. Farris was a member of the Maine Senate from 1941 to 1945 and was chairman of the legislative judiciary committee from 1942 to 1945.

Farris was the Republican nominee for mayor of Augusta in the 1942 election and was declared the winner by 25 votes. He was inaugurated on January 4, 1943, but a recount conducted under the supervision of judge Raymond Fellows found that Levi T. Williams had won the election by five votes. On January 12, Farris dropped his appeals and conceded the election to Williams. Williams was sworn in on January 18.

In 1945, Farris sought the office of Maine Attorney General – a position that is elected by the Maine Legislature. Farris won the Republican nomination over state senators Joseph E. Harvey and Oscar H. Dunbar and former Kennebec County Attorney William H. Niehoff after three ballots of voting and was elected to a two-year term by the Republican-majority legislator. He was reelected in 1947. He broke precedent by seeking a third term, which led to Alexander A. LaFleur and John G. Marshall challenging him for the Republican nomination. Farris was able to secure victory on the second ballot, receiving 76 votes to LaFleur's 69 and Marshall's 3. Farris and LaFleur faced off again in 1951. This time, LaFleur won 82 votes to 70.

== Death ==
Farris died on April 2, 1968, at his home in Augusta.
