= Clement F. Robinson =

American politician

38th Maine Attorney General
- In office 1929–1932
- Governor: William Tudor Gardiner
- Preceded by: Raymond Fellows
- Succeeded by: Clyde R. Chapman

Personal details
- Born: Clement F. Robinson; March 27, 1882 Brunswick, Maine
- Died: December 13, 1964 (aged 82) Brunswick, Maine
- Party: Republican
- Education: Bowdoin College (BA); Harvard Law School (LLB)

Clement F. Robinson (March 27, 1882 - December 13, 1964) was an American politician who served as the Maine Attorney General from 1931 to 1933.
