= 1956 Maine gubernatorial election =

- September 10, 1956
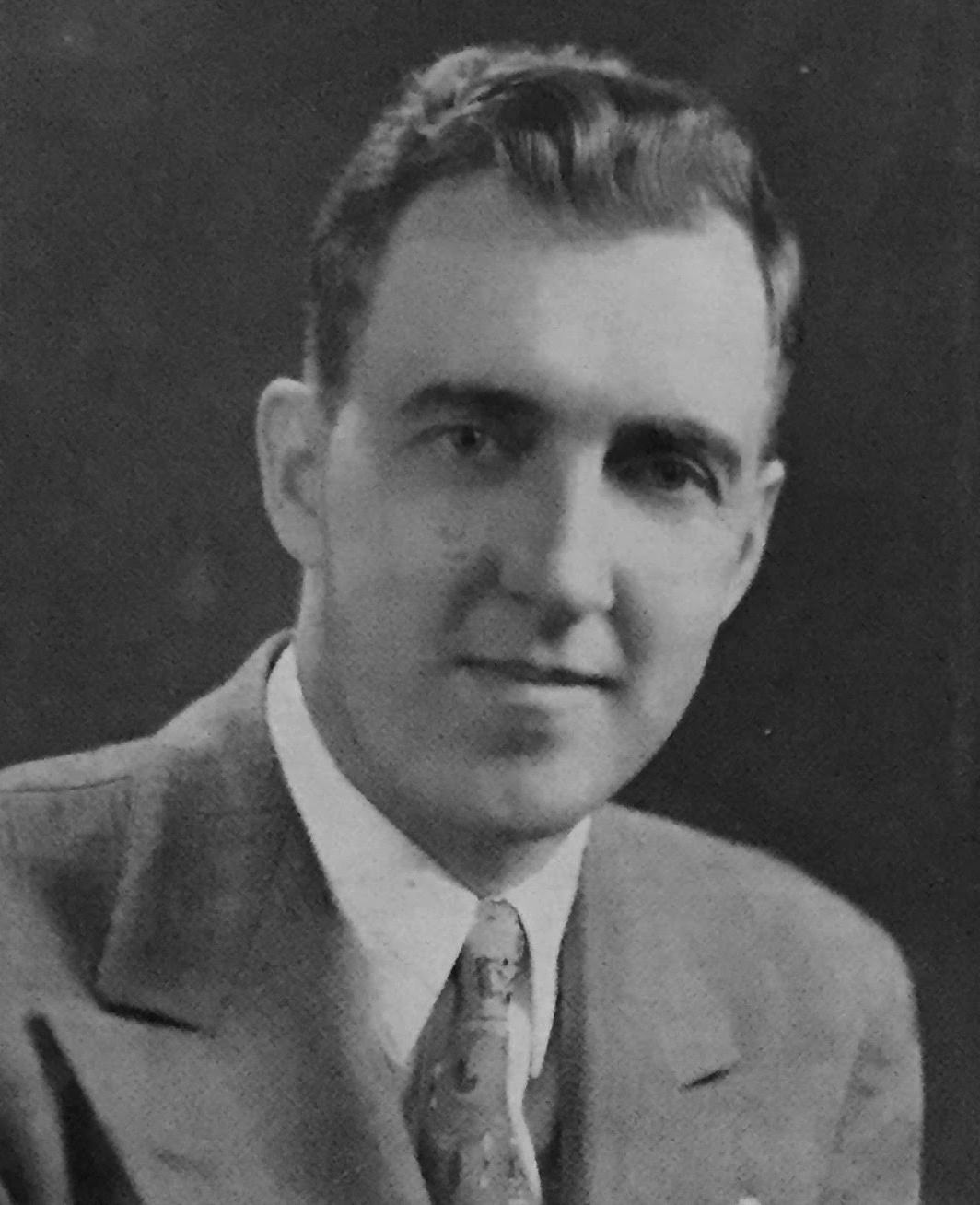

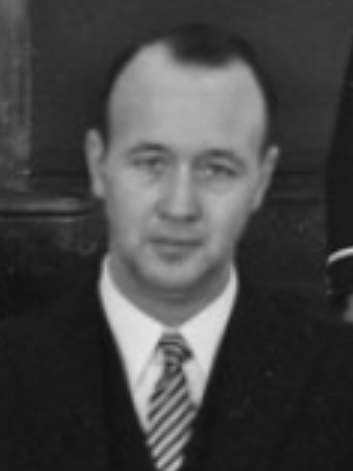
Nominee	Edmund Muskie	Willis A. Trafton Jr.
Party	Democratic	Republican
Popular vote	180,254	124,395
Percentage	59.17%	40.83%
- County results Muskie: 50–60% 60–70% Trafton: 50–60%
Governor before election
Edmund Muskie
Democratic
Elected Governor
Edmund Muskie
Democratic

The 1956 Maine gubernatorial election took place on September 10, 1956. Incumbent Democratic Governor Edmund Muskie was seeking re-election, and faced off against Republican Willis A. Trafton Jr. in the general election. Extremely popular, Muskie was able to easily win re-election, carrying every county in the state except the Republican strongholds of Hancock and Lincoln.

== Democratic primary ==
Muskie was unopposed in the Democratic primary.

== Republican primary ==
=== Candidates ===
- Philip F. Chapman Jr., state senator
- Alexander A. LaFleur, former Maine attorney general (1951–1954)
- Willis A. Trafton Jr., speaker of the Maine House of Representatives (1955–1956)

=== Results ===
Republican primary results
Party	Candidate	Votes	%
Republican	Willis A. Trafton, Jr.	42,901	50.85
Republican	Philip F. Chapman, Jr.	24,787	29.38
Republican	Alexander LaFleur	16,479	19.53
Republican	Edmund Muskie (write-in)	196	0.23
Republican	Others	6	0.00
Total votes		84,369	100.00

== Results ==
1956 gubernatorial election, Maine
Party	Candidate	Votes	%	±%
Democratic	Edmund Muskie (incumbent)	180,254	59.17%	−
Republican	Willis A. Trafton, Jr.	124,395	40.83%	−
Majority		55,859	18.34%	

=== Counties that flipped from Republican to Democratic ===
- Cumberland (largest city: Portland)
- Franklin (largest town: Farmington)
- Knox (largest municipality: Rockland)
