= Jed Prouty Tavern and Inn =

- U.S. National Register of Historic Places
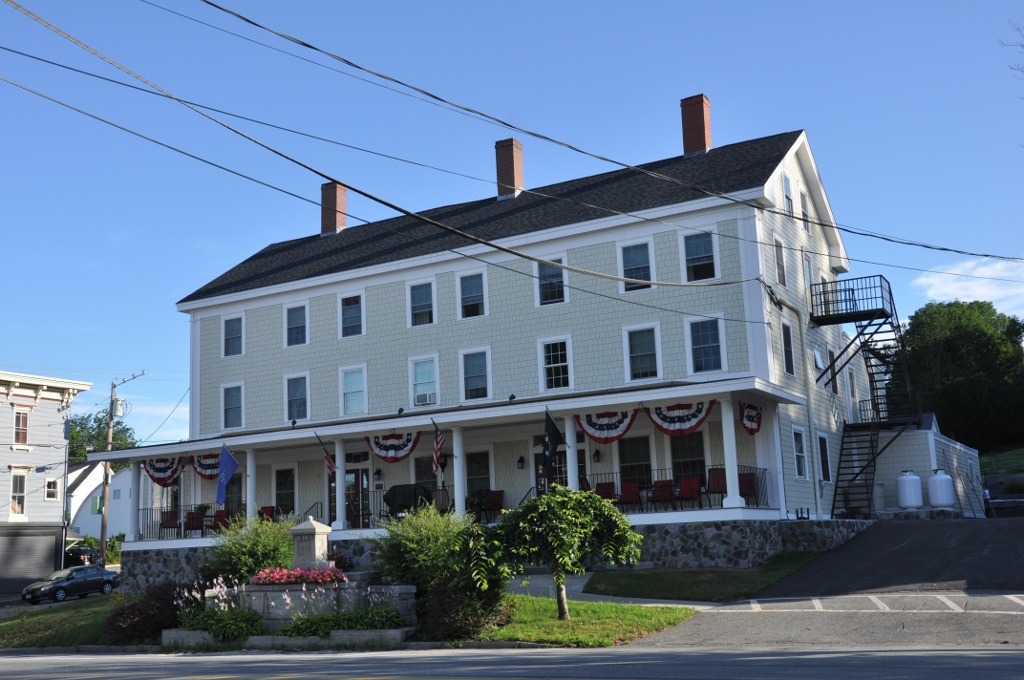

- Location within Maine Location within the United States
- Location: 57 Main Street, Bucksport, Maine
- Coordinates: 44°34′17″N 68°47′30″W
- Area: less than one acre
- Built: c. 1780
- NRHP reference No.: 86000074

The Jed Prouty Tavern and Inn is an historic building at 57 Main Street in downtown Bucksport, Hancock County, Maine. It was built around 1780 as a two family home and was converted into a tavern and inn around 1820. In this guise it hosted prominent national figures, including Daniel Webster and Presidents Martin Van Buren and William Henry Harrison. After standing largely vacant in the later 20th century, the building was converted an assisted living facility, and presently serves as a community senior center. it was listed on the National Register of Historic Places in 1986.

== Description and history ==
The tavern is set on the north side of Main Street in the center of Bucksport, between Central and Federal Streets. It is a large three-story wood-frame building, eight bays wide, with a side gable roof, clapboard siding, and three brick chimneys. The facade is symmetrically arranged, with two entrances under a full-width porch. The building has modest Greek Revival styling, including corner pilasters and doorway surrounds. A series of 20th-century additions extend the building to the rear.

The oldest portion of the tavern dates to about 1783, when Asa Peabody built a two-story frame house here. In 1820 this building was purchased by a man named Sparhawk and adapted it for use as an inn and tavern, serving travelers en route between Bangor and Castine. The name "Jed Prouty" was adopted for it in the early 19th century, based on a play in which the building was featured. In about 1850 the building was substantially enlarged, with the building extended westward and the third floor added. Its Greek Revival styling probably dates to this period. Its 19th-century guests include a number of prominent national politicians, including Daniel Webster, Martin Van Buren, William Henry Harrison, Jefferson Davis, Andrew Jackson, and John Tyler. The building was still serving as an inn at the time of its listing on the National Register of Historic Places in 1986.

In the 1990s, the building was significantly modernized, including the addition of a sprinkler system, elevators and other additions needed to turn it into an elder care facility. The building was sold at auction in 2011 and is currently the Jed Prouty Assisted Living Center.

== See also ==
- National Register of Historic Places listings in Hancock County, Maine
