= Bucksport station =

- Bucksport Railroad Station
- U.S. National Register of Historic Places
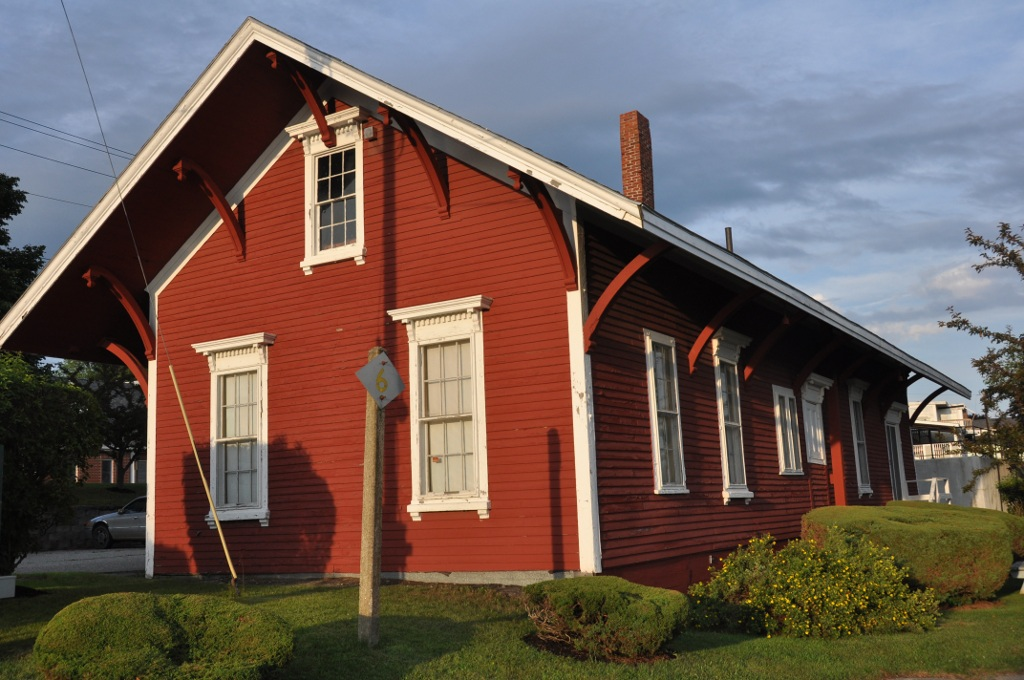

- Location within Maine Location within the United States
- Location: Main Street, Bucksport, Maine
- Coordinates: 44°34′19″N 68°47′50″W
- Area: 1 acre (0.40 ha)
- Built: 1874
- NRHP reference No.: 75000091
- Added to NRHP: April 28, 1975

The Bucksport Railroad Station is a historic railroad station on Main Street in Bucksport, Maine. The station was built in 1874 by the European and North American Railway, and is one of a small number of surviving rural railroad stations in Maine. It is now home to the Bucksport Historical Society Museum. It was listed on the National Register of Historic Places in 1975.

== Description and history ==
The station is a rectangular wood frame structure, 1-1/2 stories in height, with a gable roof that has extended eaves and gables supported by knee brackets. The exterior is sheathed in clapboards, and the building rests on a granite foundation. The long southern facade originally faced a railroad platform, and is organized into seven bays. The leftmost (western) bay provided a window for the ticket office, the next four bays housed windows and a door for the passenger waiting area, and the last two bays housed a window and a wide door for the freight area. The northern facade, facing Main Street, is similarly arranged, except the ticket office door is in the bay furthest west. The narrow ends of the building both have three windows, two in the first level and one in the half story.

The European and North American Railway (E&NR) was founded in 1851 with the objective of providing rail service between Portland, Maine and Canso, Nova Scotia as a means of shortening sea travel times between North America and Europe, and to facilitate the movement of goods between the various colonies of British North America (now Canada). The principal line intended to provide this service ran via Bangor, and the company in the early 1870s built a narrow-gauge spur line to Bucksport in response to a local petition. This station was built in 1874 to serve this line. The E&NR failed a few years later, and the route was locally operated until it was consolidated into the Maine Central Railroad in 1884. The station is now home to the Bucksport Historical Society, which has offices and a museum on the premises.

== See also ==
- National Register of Historic Places listings in Hancock County, Maine

Preceding station	Maine Central Railroad	Following station
Terminus	Bucksport – Bangor	Chipmans toward Bangor
