= William Pierce Stubbs =

American painter

William Pierce Stubbs (1842–1909) or W.P. Stubbs was a marine painter in the Boston, Massachusetts, area in the 19th century. He shared a Boston studio with fellow marine painter Wesley Webber. Examples of his work are in the Bostonian Society; Cape Ann Museum; and Peabody Essex Museum. He also lived in Bucksport, Maine.

== Images ==
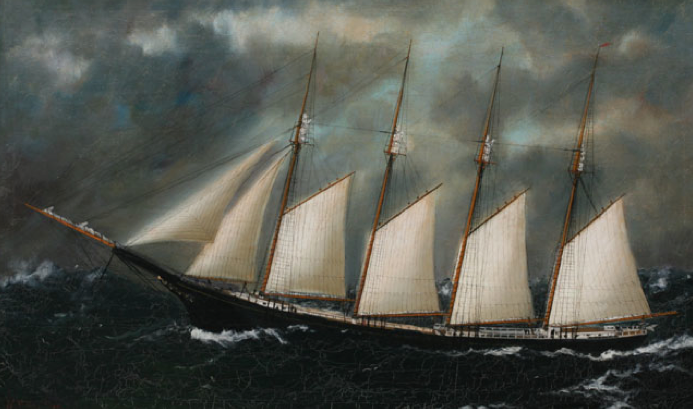
Schooner O. H. Brown

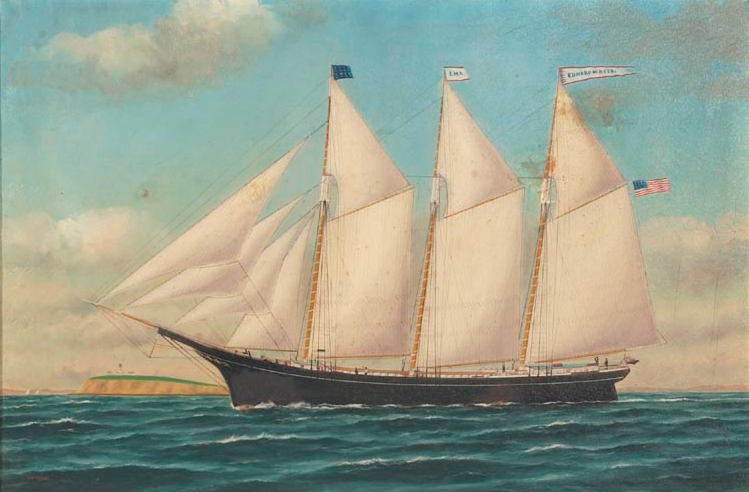
Schooner Edward M. Reed

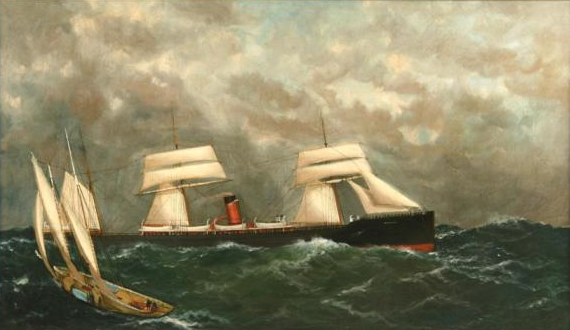
SS Cephalonia by William Pierce Stubbs, 1888

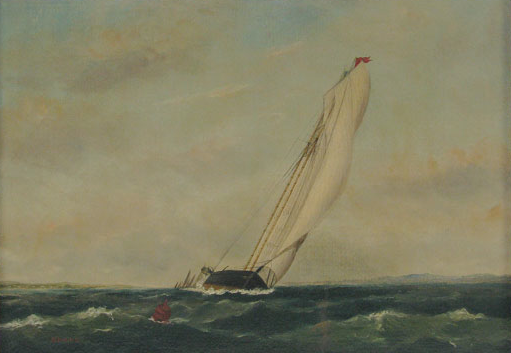
Yacht race around buoy

== See also ==
- American Painters
- Visual art of the United States
