= Bucksport High School =

Location
- 102 Broadway; Bucksport, Maine 04416; United States
- Coordinates: 44.5766°N 68.7821°W

Information
- Type: Public high school
- Motto: Empowering Students to Lead Enriching Lives in a Changing World
- Established: 1933; 93 years ago
- School district: Regional School Unit 25
- Superintendent: Joshua Tripp
- Principal: Aaron Ward
- Teaching staff: 27.60 (FTE)
- Grades: 9-12
- Enrollment: 361 (2024-2025)
- Student to teacher ratio: 13.08
- Campus type: Rural
- Colors: Purple and gold
- Athletics conference: Little Ten Conference
- Mascot: Golden Buck
- Nickname: Golden Bucks
- Yearbook: Hillcrest
- Communities served: Bucksport, Orland, Prospect, Verona Island
- Website: bhs.rsu25.org

Bucksport High School is a public high school in Bucksport, Maine, United States. It is part of Regional School Unit (RSU) 25. Between 350 and 400 students study at Bucksport High School. It also provides a satellite program on campus for Hancock County Technical Center.
