= Wesley Webber =

American painter (1841–1914)

- Born: Wesley Elbridge Webber; 1841; Gardiner, Maine, U.S.
- Died: November 4, 1914; Wollaston, Massachusetts, U.S.
- Education: Self-taught
- Known for: Painting, lithography
- Notable work: Appomattox Court House, Va. (1865)
- Movement: White Mountain art

Signature
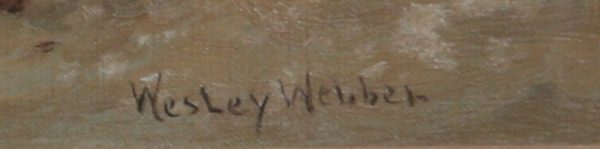

Wesley Elbridge Webber (1841 – November 4, 1914) was an American landscape and marine painter. Largely self-taught, he worked from studios in Boston and, after 1892, in New York City, mainly painting the harbors and shorelines of New England and the mountain scenery of Conway, New Hampshire.

Webber served with the 16th Maine Infantry Regiment during the American Civil War and made drawings at the Battle of Appomattox Court House in April 1865, one of which was published as a hand-colored lithograph by the Boston firm of J. H. Bufford & Sons. Civil War subjects, exhibited at the Boston Art Club, established his early reputation, after which he turned mainly to landscape and marine painting.

Webber exhibited at the Boston Art Club and the National Academy of Design, and his work is held by the Peabody Essex Museum, the Brooklyn Museum, the Boston Athenaeum and the Portland Museum of Art, among other institutions. He died in 1914; the following year, his family dispersed the contents of his studio, comprising more than 140 paintings, at auction in Boston.

== Early life and training ==
Webber was born in Gardiner, Maine, in 1841. While some sources cite his birth year as 1839, most records and museum entries indicate 1841.

About 1858, Webber moved to Boston, where he was apprenticed for roughly three years to J. C. Roberts, an ornamental sign and carriage painter with premises at Haymarket Square. He received no academic training and is consistently described as self-taught.

== Civil War service ==
Webber enlisted in Company B of the 16th Maine Infantry Regiment in 1862. The regiment served in the Army of the Potomac and, by the spring of 1865, formed part of the 2nd Brigade, 3rd Division, V Corps.

Two lithographs after Webber's wartime drawings survive in institutional collections. Camp Leavitt. Winter Quarters of the 16th. Maine Regiment, March 18th. 1865, printed by J. H. Bufford's lithography works, is a bird's-eye view of the regiment's encampment near Mitchell Station, Virginia, annotated with a key to brigade and regimental headquarters, officers' quarters and neighboring units. Appomattox Court House, Va., also issued by Bufford in 1865, is inscribed as having been "[d]rawn on the spot by W. Webber" at the headquarters of the 2nd Brigade, 3rd Division, V Corps, and is subtitled as the place where Lee surrendered the Army of Northern Virginia to Ulysses S. Grant. Rather than depicting the surrender itself, the print shows the village and its surroundings, with a numbered legend identifying the McLean House, the court house, Confederate artillery and ammunition, groups of Union and Confederate soldiers trading, and the Confederate camps beyond the town.

Webber's original sketches, together with finished Civil War illustrations, were shown at the Boston Art Club, and wood engravings after his work appeared in Harper's Weekly. He was discharged at Augusta, Maine, on June 15, 1865, and opened a studio in Gardiner.

== Career ==
=== Boston ===
Webber established himself in Boston, where he maintained a studio from about 1870 until the end of the 1880s. He worked for a period in Pemberton Square and later shared studio space with the marine painter William Pierce Stubbs. He was a member of the Boston Art Club and exhibited there regularly, as well as at the National Academy of Design in New York, the Brooklyn Art Association, the New England Manufacturers' and Mechanics' Institute, the Peabody Academy of Science in Salem and the Portland Society of Art.

=== White Mountains and coastal subjects ===
Webber spent summers painting around Conway, New Hampshire, where he worked alongside John Joseph Enneking, Frank Henry Shapleigh and others. His dated New Hampshire subjects fall largely between 1873 and 1876 and are drawn mainly from the Conway area, though titles such as Androscoggin River near Gorham, N.H. and Outlet of Winnipesaukee Lake indicate a wider range.

He also painted extensively along the coast, particularly at Gloucester and Manchester-by-the-Sea, and travelled to Nova Scotia and elsewhere in Canada.

=== New York ===
By 1892 Webber had moved his practice to New York City. From 1897 until 1914 he kept a studio at 11 East 14th Street, near Union Square, which became a gathering place for other painters working in the city.

== Later life and death ==
Webber was married twice. Biographical accounts attribute a decline in his later work, from about 1900, to alcoholism. In 1914 he left New York for the home of his daughter in the Wollaston neighborhood of Quincy, Massachusetts, where he died on November 4. He was buried in Gardiner.

In February 1915 Webber's family consigned the contents of his studio to the Boston auction house of C. F. Libbie and Company. The sale comprised more than 140 finished paintings, including marine and landscape subjects, animal studies, Civil War scenes and still lifes.

== Style and reception ==
Webber painted in a detailed realist manner, working from direct observation, and his landscapes have been described as recalling the Hudson River School in handling and composition. His association with Enneking and Shapleigh in New Hampshire is generally credited with shaping this approach.

His Appomattox lithograph has been discussed in the literature on Civil War popular prints as an example of the topographical, rather than commemorative, treatment of the surrender: it presents the village and its terrain in place of the meeting of the commanders that most contemporary printmakers chose to depict.

== Collections ==
Works by Webber are held by:

- Boston Athenaeum
- Brooklyn Museum
- Gilcrease Museum
- New-York Historical Society
- New York Public Library
- Peabody Essex Museum
- Portland Museum of Art
- Virginia Museum of Fine Arts (lithograph)
- William L. Clements Library, University of Michigan (lithograph)

== Selected works ==
- Appomattox Court House, Va. (1865), hand-colored lithograph printed by J. H. Bufford & Sons, Virginia Museum of Fine Arts
- Camp Leavitt. Winter Quarters of the 16th. Maine Regiment, March 18th. 1865 (c. 1865), lithograph, William L. Clements Library
- Kennebec River, Peabody Essex Museum
- Maine Boat Shop and Unidentified Vessels Ice-bound at Gloucester, Peabody Essex Museum

== Gallery ==
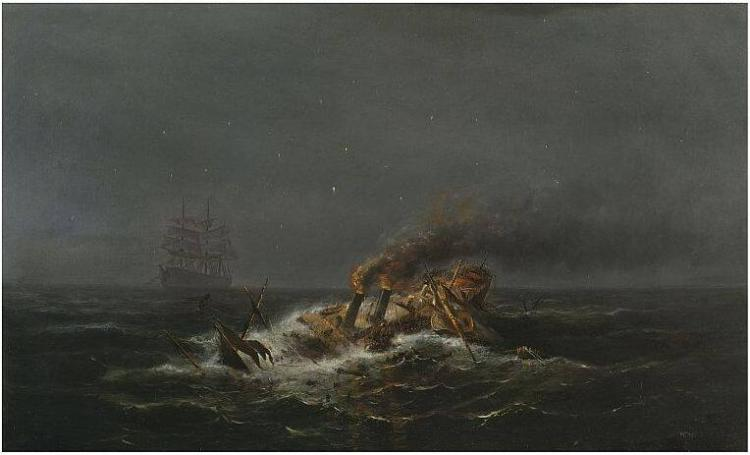
Sinking of the "Ville du Havre," November 22, 1873 (1874)

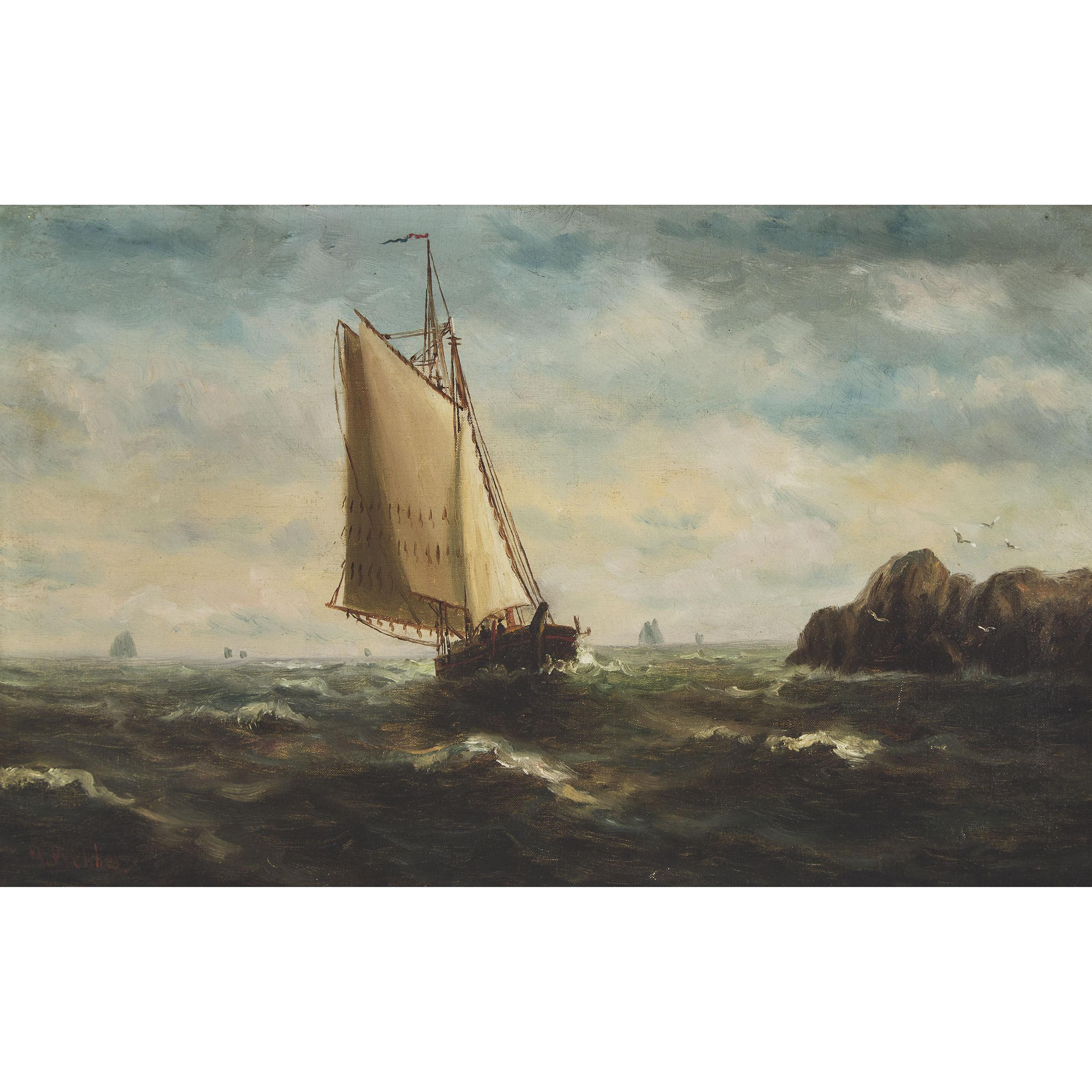
American Ships at Sea

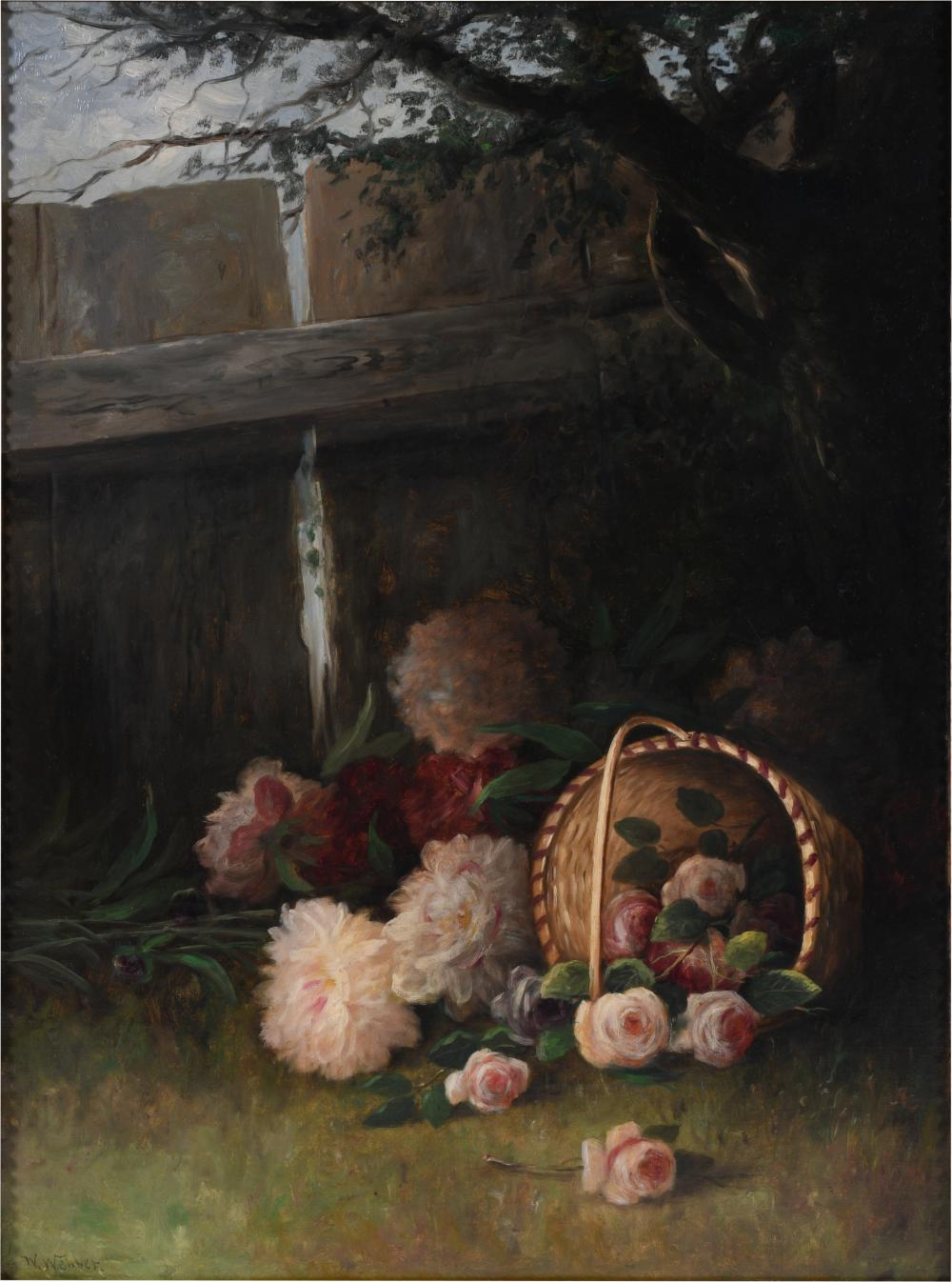
The Fallen Basket

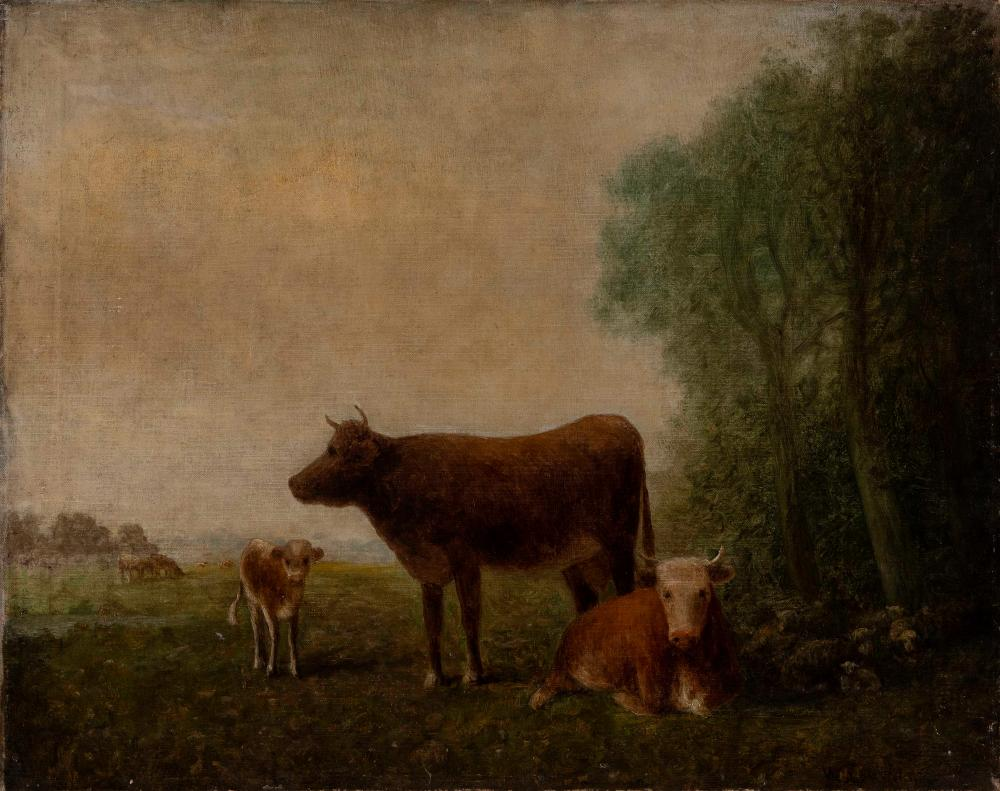
Cattle in a Field
