= Erastus Foote =

American lawyer and politician (1777–1856)

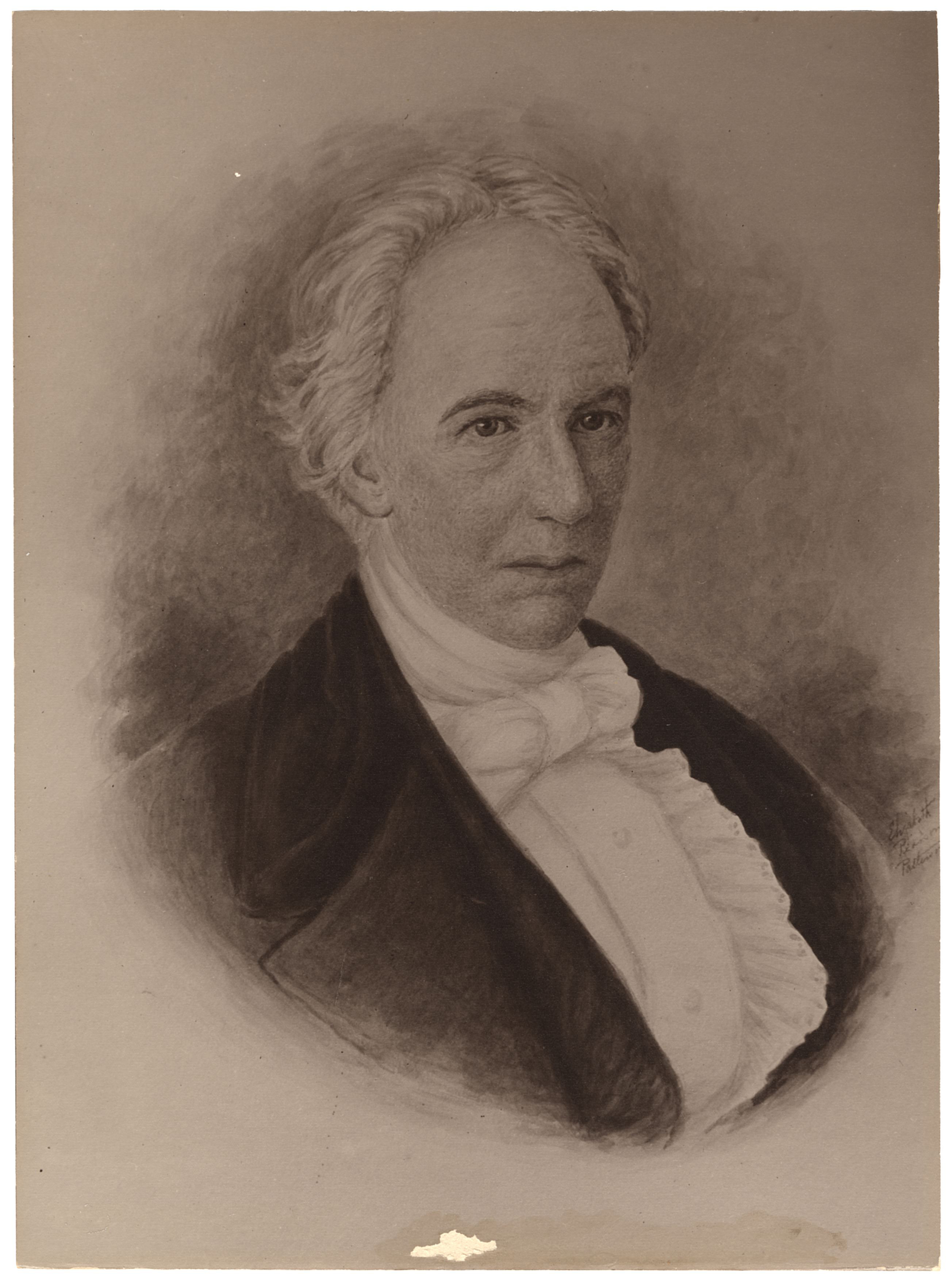

1st Attorney General of Maine
- In office 1820–1831
- Preceded by: inaugural officeholder
- Succeeded by: Jonathan P. Rogers

Member of the Maine House of Representatives
- In office 1840

Member of the Maine Senate
- In office 1820

Member of the Massachusetts House of Representatives
- In office 1819-1820

Member of the Massachusetts Senate
- In office 1812-1813

Personal details
- Born: September 19, 1777 Waterbury, Connecticut
- Died: July 14, 1856 (aged 78) Wiscasset, Maine
- Party: Democratic-Republican
- Spouse(s): Susan Carleton (m. 1812, died 1817); Eliza Carleton (m. 1820, his death 1856)
- Children: 5

Erastus Foote (September 19, 1777 – July 14, 1856) was an American lawyer and politician. He was a supporter of Maine statehood and served as the state's first Attorney General.

== Early life ==
Erastus Foote was born in Waterbury, Connecticut on September 19, 1777, the son of Obed and Mary Foote and the fifth of six children. He studied with Samuel Hiockley in Northampton, Massachusetts, and was admitted to the bar in 1800. He opened a law firm in Concord, Massachusetts, but moved to Camden, Maine, when it was still part of Massachusetts, later that year to work as a lawyer. In 1811, he was appointed County Attorney of Lincoln County. He remained in Camden during the War of 1812, and was a given the title of Colonel while serving in the Massachusetts militia.

== Political career ==
In 1812 he was elected to Massachusetts State Senate as a Jeffersonian Republican.

In 1816 he ran for the U.S. House of Representatives for Massachusetts' 16th district, but lost to Federalist Benjamin Orr.

In 1819 he was elected to the Massachusetts House. After Maine had achieved statehood, he was elected to the first Maine Senate in 1820, but was appointed to the position of Attorney General by Governor William King that same year. He would be appointed twice more and serve in that office until 1831. In 1840 he was elected to the Maine State House of Representatives.

== Later life ==
He had five children, one with his first wife Susan Carleton, and four with his second wife Eliza Carleton.

He died on July 14, 1856, at the age of 78 in Wiscasset, Maine.
