= Frank Fellows (politician) =

American politician (1889–1951)

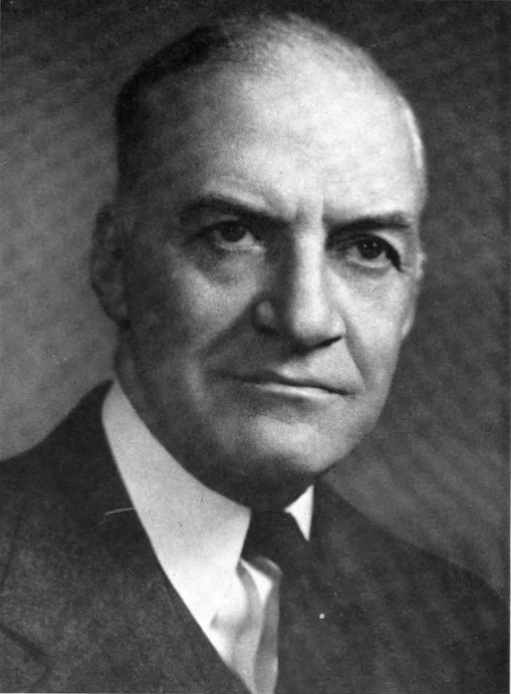

Member of the U.S. House of Representatives from Maine's 3rd district
- In office January 3, 1941 – August 27, 1951
- Preceded by: Ralph Owen Brewster
- Succeeded by: Clifford McIntire

Personal details
- Born: Frank Fellows; November 7, 1889 Bucksport, Maine, U.S.
- Died: August 27, 1951 (aged 61) Bangor, Maine, U.S.
- Party: Republican
- Spouse: Georgia Eleanor Maling (m. 1910; died 1951)
- Children: 5
- Education: University of Maine (BA); University of Maine (LLB)

Frank Fellows (November 7, 1889 – August 27, 1951) was a U.S. representative from Maine serving from 1941 until his death in Bangor, Maine in 1951.

== Early life and education ==
Frank Fellows was born on November 7, 1889 in Bucksport, Maine to parents Oscar Fowler Fellows and Eva Marie Fling Fellows (née Fling). He is the younger brother of Raymond Fellows, a Maine Supreme Judicial Court justice.

Fellows attended the public schools, East Maine Conference Seminary in Bucksport, Maine, and the University of Maine. Fellows graduated from the University of Maine College of Law, admitted to the bar in 1911, and commenced practice in Portland, Maine. He served as clerk of the United States District Court of Maine 1917–1920. He later moved his practice to Bangor, Maine.

== Political career ==
Fellows was elected as a Republican to the Seventy-seventh Congress and to the five succeeding Congresses and served from January 3, 1941, until his death in Bangor, August 27, 1951. He represented Bangor and Eastern Maine in the 3rd Congressional District, taking the seat of his political mentor, Owen Brewster, who had successfully run for the United States Senate.

Fellows began to make a national name for himself in 1948 with 'red-baiting' speeches, such as one in Baltimore in which he said "we need to spray and fumigate the State Dept. with DDT of 100% strength".

As Chairman of the House Sub-Committee on Immigration, he sponsored a House bill to admit over 200,000 "displaced persons" (European war refugees) into the United States, and fought as "blatently [sic] discriminatory" the Senate version of the same legislation which would have barred Jews and created preferences for northern Europeans. Even the Fellows Bill, however, left out Asians, and set a total quota only half as large as the one requested by President Truman.

== Personal life and death ==
Fellows married Georgia Eleanor Maling on June 27, 1910. Together they had five children, including two sons who became lawyers. Fellows died in office on August 27, 1951, following an illness. He is buried at Silver Lake Cemetery, Bucksport, Maine.

== See also ==
- List of members of the United States Congress who died in office (1950–1999)

U.S. House of Representatives
Preceded by Owen Brewster	Member of the U.S. House of Representatives from Maine's 3rd congressional district January 3, 1941 – August 27, 1951 (obsolete district)	Succeeded by Clifford McIntire
