= Charles E. Littlefield =

American lawyer and politician (1851–1915)

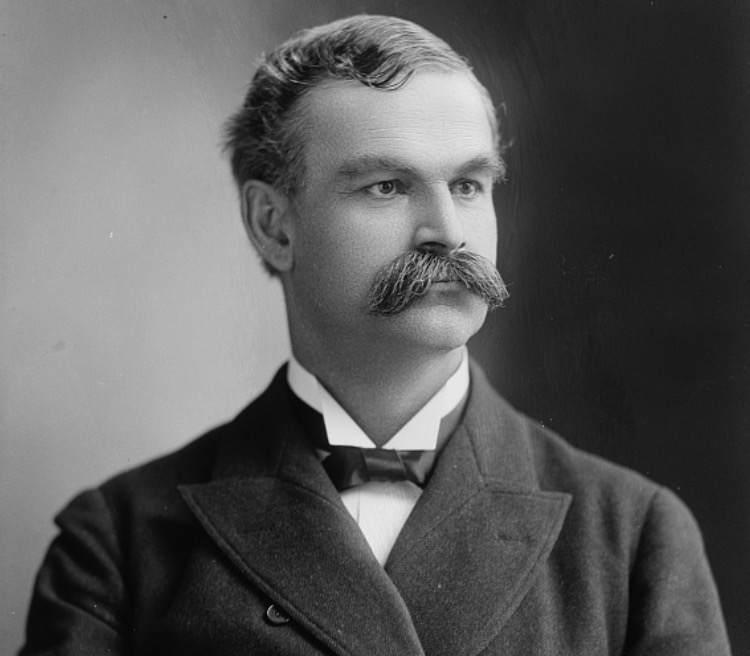
- Portrait of Littlefield by Charles Milton Bell

Member of the U.S. House of Representatives from Maine's 2nd district
- In office June 19, 1899 – September 30, 1908
- Preceded by: Nelson Dingley Jr.
- Succeeded by: John P. Swasey

Maine Attorney General
- In office 1889–1892
- Preceded by: Orville D. Baker
- Succeeded by: Frederick A. Powers

Member of the Maine House of Representatives
- In office 1885–1888

Speaker of the Maine House of Representatives
- In office 1888–1889
- Preceded by: Charles Hamlin
- Succeeded by: Fred Dow

Personal details
- Born: Charles Edgar Littlefield; June 21, 1851 Lebanon, Maine, US
- Died: May 2, 1915 (aged 63) New York City, US
- Occupation: Politician, lawyer

Charles Edgar Littlefield (June 21, 1851 – May 2, 1915) was an American lawyer and politician. A Republican, he was a member of the United States House of Representatives from Maine. He also served as Speaker of the Maine House of Representatives and Maine Attorney General.

== Early life ==
Littlefield was born on June 21, 1851, in Lebanon, Maine, to carpenter and Free Will Baptist minister William Hobbs Littlefield and Mary (née Stevens) Littlefield. He was third cousin twice removed to politician Nathaniel Littlefield. Educated at common schools, he attended Foxcroft Academy. He was admitted to the Maine State Bar Association in March 1876 at age 25, after which he practiced in Rockland. From 1889 to until his death, he was a fellow of Bates College.

== Career ==
Littlefield was a member of the Republican Party. He was a member of the Rockland Common Council, chairman of the Knox County Republican Party Committee, and a member of the Maine Republican Committee. He served in the Maine House of Representatives from 1885 to 1887, and from 1888 to 1889, was Speakers of the House. From 1889 to 1892, he served as Maine Attorney General, as which he brough upon the Supreme Court case State of Maine v. Grand Trunk Railway Company of Canada (1891). He was also a delegate to the 1892 and 1896 Republican National Conventions.

Following the death of Nelson Dingley Jr., Littlefield was elected to serve Maine's 2nd district in the United States House of Representatives to complete his unexpired tenure. He served from June 19, 1899, until his resignation on September 30, 1908. He resigned due to personal financial troubles. During his tenure, he was chairman of the Committee on Expenditures in the Department of Agriculture, as well as a member of the Committees on the Judiciary and on Merchant Marine and Fisheries.

Politically, Littlefield was uncompromising in his beliefs, even if opposed by his party. He was anti-union, with him citing, besides his financial troubles, the growth in pro-union policy in Congress as reason for his resignation; this belief made him an adversary of union leader Samuel Gompers during his 1906 re-election. He was non-interventionalist, opposed to the 1903 Cuban–American Treaty of Relations and the Payne–Aldrich Tariff Act. He campaigned in the guise of prohibitionism and supported the Webb–Kenyon Act, though was a drinker in private. He was uncompromising in his beliefs, with President Theodore Roosevelt calling him an "off ox" due to his unconventional record in Congress compared to the rest of his party. He was also a strong speaker, with newspaperman Amos J. Cummings calling him "the best orator in Congress".

== Later career and death ==
After resigning from Congress, Littlefield moved to New York City, where he resumed his practice of law. He head the legal branch of the Citizens' Alliance, an anti-union organization. He practiced alongside his son, Charles W. Littlefield. On February 18, 1878, he married Clara H. Ayer. He died on May 2, 1915, aged 63, in New York City, from an embolism. He was buried on May 7, at Achorn Cemetery, in Rockland.

Legal offices
Preceded by Orville D. Baker	Maine Attorney General; 1889–1892	Succeeded by Frederick A. Powers
U.S. House of Representatives
Preceded by Nelson Dingley, Jr.	Member of the U.S. House of Representatives from Maine's 2nd congressional district June 19, 1899 – September 30, 1908	Succeeded by John P. Swasey
