= Orville D. Baker =

American lawyer and politician

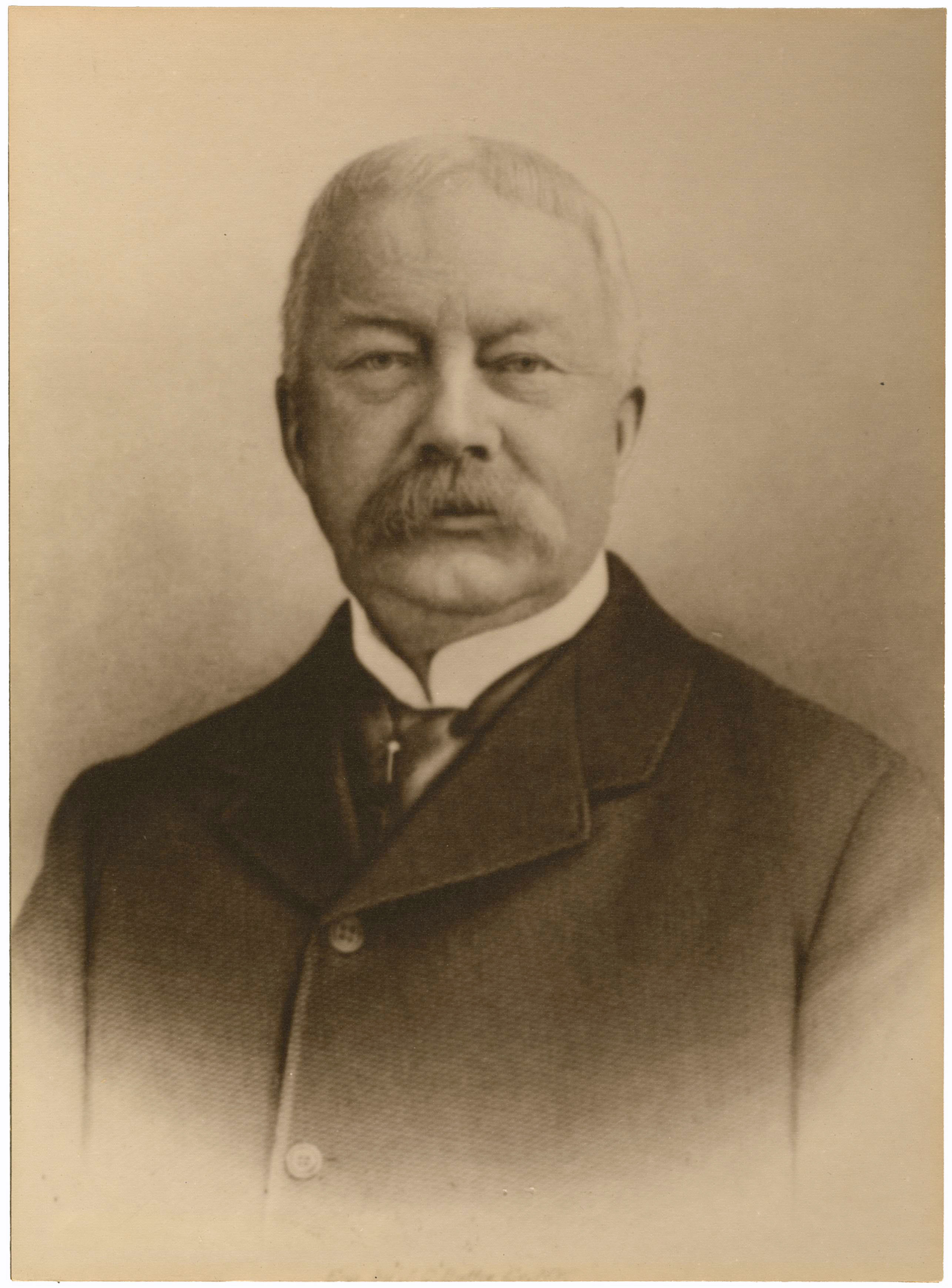

24th Attorney General of Maine
- In office January 8, 1885 – 1888
- Governor: Frederick Robie; Joseph R. Bodwell; Sebastian Streeter Marble
- Preceded by: Henry B. Cleaves
- Succeeded by: Charles E. Littlefield

Personal details
- Born: December 23, 1847
- Died: 1908
- Party: Republican Party
- Education: Bowdoin College; Harvard Law School

Orville Dewey Baker (23 December 1847 – 1908) was an American lawyer and politician who served as the 24th attorney general of Maine between 1885 and 1888.

Baker was the nephew of Maine's second attorney general, Jonathan P. Rogers, who was Baker's maternal uncle.

== Early life and education ==
Orville Baker was born to Joseph Baker and Frances Baker (née Gilman) on 23 December 1847 in Augusta, Maine. He attended Bowdoin College when he was aged 16 through 20, from 1864 to 1868. He was a member of Delta Kappa Epsilon fraternity and Phi Beta Kappa honor society. He was valedictorian of his graduating class. He spent two years thereafter traveling Europe before returning to the United States to read law in his father's firm.

In 1871 he completed a Master of Arts program at Bowdoin College. In 1872, he graduated from Harvard Law School. Despite receiving offers to teach at Southern University and his alma mater, Harvard Law School, Baker decided to immediately enter the legal profession. He was admitted to the Kennebec County bar in 1872.

Baker never married and had no known children.

== Legal career ==
Baker was admitted to the bar of the US Supreme Court in 1883, just a decade after his admittance to the bar in Maine. During this time, he represented clients such as Western Union Telegraph and Edwards Manufacturing.

He was elected by the Maine Legislature to serve as the state's attorney general on January 8, 1885. His term ended in January 1885.

Baker died in 1908. At the time of his death he was president of the Maine Bar Association. He is buried at Forest Grove Cemetery in Augusta, Maine.

Legal offices
Preceded by Henry B. Cleaves	Maine Attorney General; 1885–1888	Succeeded by Charles E. Littlefield
