= Willis A. Trafton Jr. =

American politician and lawyer

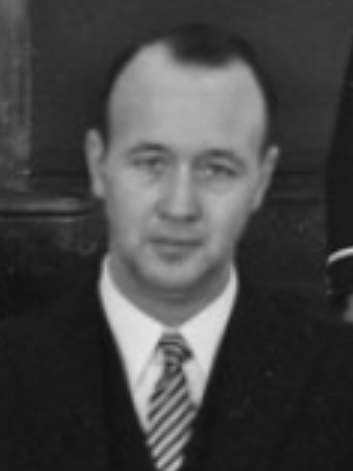

Speaker of the Maine House of Representatives
- In office 1955–1956
- Preceded by: Roswell P. Bates
- Succeeded by: Joseph T. Edgar

Personal details
- Born: November 13, 1918 Auburn, Maine, U.S.
- Died: April 3, 1994 (aged 75) Auburn, Maine, U.S.
- Party: Republican
- Spouse: Virginia Grier
- Children: five
- Education: Yale University, Harvard Law School
- Profession: Attorney

Willis Allen Trafton Jr. (November 13, 1918 – April 3, 1994) was an American politician and lawyer from Maine. A Republican from Auburn, Maine, Trafton served in the Maine House of Representatives and was its Speaker from 1955 to 1956. He was a lawyer, with degrees from Yale University and Harvard University (1947). He also was the Republican nominee for Governor of Maine in the 1956 Maine gubernatorial election.

Party political offices
Preceded by Burton M. Cross	Republican nominee for Governor of Maine; 1956	Succeeded by Horace Hildreth
