= 16th Maine Infantry Regiment =

- Active: August 14, 1862, to May 31, 1865
- Country: United States
- Allegiance: Union
- Branch: Infantry
- Engagements: Battle of South Mountain; Battle of Antietam; Battle of Fredericksburg; Battle of Chancellorsville; Battle of Gettysburg; Battle of the Wilderness; Battle of Spotsylvania Court House; Battle of Cold Harbor; Siege of Petersburg; Battle of the Weldon Railroad; Battle of New Market Heights; Battle of Hatcher's Run; Appomattox Campaign; Battle of Five Forks; Battle of Appomattox Court House

Commanders
- Colonel: Asa W. Wildes
- Colonel: Charles B. Merrill,

Insignia
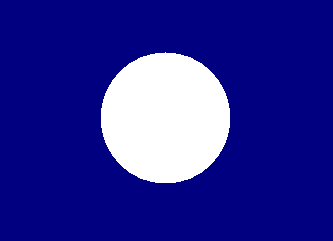
- 2nd Div, III Corps, AoV/I Corps, AoP - August, 1862-March, 1864

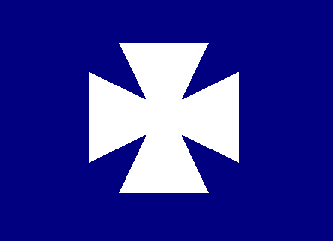
- 2nd Div, V Corps - March, 1864-June, 1864

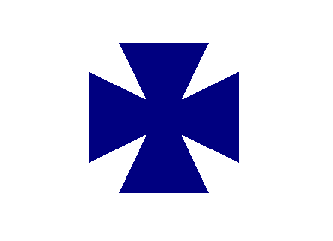
- 3rd Div, V Corps - August, 1864-June, 1865

The 16th Maine Infantry Regiment was an infantry regiment that served in the Union Army during the American Civil War. The regiment was one of five raised in answer to the July 2, 1862, call by Lincoln for 300,000 volunteers for three years. The state of Maine's quota was 9,609. It was particularly noted for its service during the 1863 Battle of Gettysburg.

== Organization and assignments ==
The 16th Maine was organized at Augusta, Maine, and mustered into Federal service for a three-year enlistment on August 14, 1862. It departed for Washington, D.C. in 1862. It was assigned to:

- 3rd Brigade, 2nd Division, III Corps, Army of Virginia (AoV), to September, 1862.
- 3rd Brigade, 2nd Division, I Corps, Army of the Potomac (AoP), to May, 1863.
- 1st Brigade, 2nd Division, I Corps, AoP, to March, 1864.
- 1st Brigade, 2nd Division, V Corps, AoP, to June, 1864.
- 1st Brigade, 3rd Division, V Corps, AoP, to August, 1864 or later.
- 2nd Brigade, 3rd Division, V Corps, AoP, by February 7, 1865, to April 9, 1865, or perhaps to June, 1865.

== 1862 ==
Served in the Maryland Campaign September to October.

To repel the invasion of Maryland by the Confederates, the Army of the Potomac moved northward from Washington with its front extending from near the Baltimore and Ohio Railroad to the Potomac River. On September 12, the First Corps bivouacked on the south side of the Monocacy near the crossing of the National Road (now called the Old National Road, old US 40). At the Battle of South Mountain on September 14, Joseph Hooker's I Corps attacked the Confederates holding Turner's Pass while preventing a potential flanking maneuver to its north.

The 16th Maine was detached as railroad guard during the Battle of Antietam on September 17, 1862, according to the Antietam Union order of battle. At Pleasant Valley / Sharpsburg until October 30.

Movement to Warrenton, thence to Falmouth, Virginia, October 30 to November 19. Fought at the Battle of Fredericksburg, Virginia, from December 12 to 15.

== 1863 ==
The regiment was part of the infamous "Mud March" January 20–24, 1863. At Falmouth and Belle Plain until April 27. Participated in the Chancellorsville Campaign April 27 to May 6. Operations at Pollock's Mill Creek April 29-May 2. Fitzhugh's Crossing April 29–30. Battle of Chancellorsville May 2–5. Gettysburg campaign June 11-July 24. Battle of Gettysburg July 1–3. Picket duty along the Rapidan until October --. Bristoe Campaign October 9–22. Advance to line of the Rappahanock November 7–8. Mine Run Campaign November 26-December 2.

=== Gettysburg ===
Around 11: 30 on the morning of July 1, 1863, two divisions of the 1st Corps, Army of the Potomac arrived to join a fight that had been raging all morning, as the Confederates advanced on Gettysburg from the west and from the north. Among them was the 16th Maine. The regiment, along with the rest of the army, had been marching since June 12 up from Virginia, through Maryland, and into southern Pennsylvania. They were headed toward an eventual clash with the Confederate Army that was fated to take place in and around the little market town of Gettysburg. The 16th Maine fought bitterly for approximately three hours in the fields north of the Chambersburg Pike; but by mid-afternoon, it was evident that, even with the addition of the rest of the 1st Corps and the entire 11th Corps, the position of the Union forces could not be held. They began to fall back toward the town of Gettysburg.

The 16th Maine was then ordered to withdraw to a new position to the east of where they had been fighting. "Take that position and hold it at any cost!" was the command. This meant that those of the 275 officers and men of the regiment who had not already become casualties had to sacrifice themselves to allow some 16,000 other men to retreat. This they valiantly did, but they were soon overwhelmed and forced to surrender to the Confederates. Historians say the 16th Maine fought valiantly, but its soldiers turned their attention to saving their beloved flags when they realized that defeat was inevitable. As the Southern troops bore down upon them, the men of the 16th Maine spontaneously began to tear up into little pieces their "colors."

Like other Union regiments, the 16th Maine carried an American flag and a regimental flag, known collectively as "the colors." "For a few last moments our little regiment defended angrily its hopeless challenge, but it was useless to fight longer," Abner Small of the 16th Maine wrote after the battle. "We looked at our colors, and our faces burned. We must not surrender those symbols of our pride and our faith." The regiment's color bearers "appealed to the colonel," Small wrote, "and with his consent they tore the flags from the staves and ripped the silk into shreds; and our officers and men that were near took each a shred." Each man hid his fragment of the flags inside his shirt or in a pocket. The Confederates were thus deprived of the chance to capture the flags as battle trophies. That was the 16th Maine's "greatest day," wrote Earl Hess, a history professor at Lincoln Memorial University in Tennessee, in an introduction to a collection of Small's Civil War letters published in 2000. Hess said that the 16th Maine's actions show that battle flags carried "very, very deep symbolism for Civil War soldiers, "representing the "esprit de corps" of a regiment and "a larger entity -- the country, the cause." Most of the 16th Maine survivors treasured these remnants for the rest of their lives and bequeathed them to their descendants, some of whom still possess them as family heirlooms to this day.

By sunset on July 1, 11 officers and men of the 16th Maine had been killed, 62 had been wounded, and 159 had been taken prisoner. Only 38 men of the Regiment managed to evade being captured and report for duty at 1st Corps headquarters. But the 16th Maine had bought precious time for the Union Army. Those whose retreat they had covered were able to establish a very strong position just east and south of the center of the town of Gettysburg along Cemetery Ridge. During the night and into July 2 the 1st and 11th Corps were reinforced by the rest of the Army of the Potomac. For the next two days they would withstand successive assaults by the Confederates until the final repulse of Pickett's Charge, on July 3.

== 1864 ==
Duty on the Orange & Alexandria Railroad until April, 1864. Demonstrations on the Rapidan February 6–7. Campaign from the Rapidan to the James May–June. Battle of the Wilderness May 5–7; Spottsylvania May 8–12; Spottsylvania Court House May 12–21. Assault on the Salient May 12. North Anna River May 23–26. Jericho Ford May 23. Line of the Pamunkey June 26–28. Totopotomoy May 28–31. Cold Harbor June 1–12. Bethesda Church June 1–3. White Oak Swamp June 13. Before Petersburg June 16–18. Siege of Petersburg June 16-July 14.

== 1865 ==
The regiment was discharged from service on June 5, 1865.

== Total strength and casualties ==
1,907 men served in the 16th Maine Infantry Regiment at one point or another during its service. It lost 181 enlisted men killed in action or died of wounds. 578 members of the regiment were wounded in action, 259 died of disease, and 76 died in Confederate prisons for a total of 511 fatalities from all causes, a rate of 57%.

== Armament ==
The 16th Maine was an 1862, Army of the Potomac, three-year regiment, that greatly increased the number of men under arms in the federal army. As with many of these volunteers, initially, there were not enough Model 1861 Springfield Rifles to go around so they were instead issued imported British Pattern 1853 rifles. (Note: While Maine's agents imported Enfields from Great Britain, it also purchased 1853 Enfields that had been manufactured by contract in 1855–1856 in Windsor, Vermont by the Robbins and Lawrence Armory (R&L). The company had sold gun making machinery (150 in all), to upgrade the new Enfield Armory in England prior to the Crimean War. The British also awarded a later contract during the Crimean War for 25,000 Enfield P1853 and P1856 rifles. The contract's stiff penalty clause for missing the production schedule caused R&L to go bankrupt in 1859. Eli Whitney bought some of the stock during the bankruptcy liquidation as well as leftover Enfield parts. Lamon, Goodnow and Yale (LG&Y) bought the factory to make sewing machines, but the onset of the war led them to continue producing the P1853, (as well as P1856 and licensed Sharps 1859s) for the duration of the war. The surrounding New England states and New York were eager customers for both Whitney and LG&Y.) These were the standard rifle for the British army having performed well in the Crimean War. The Enfield was a .577 calibre Minié-type muzzle-loading rifled musket. It was used by both armies and was the second most widely used infantry weapon in the Union forces.

=== Regimental ordance surveys ===
The regiment reported the following surveys for the Fredericksburg and Chancellorsville campaigns:

Fredericksburg

- A — 18 British Pattern 1853 rifles, (.58 and .577 Cal)
- B — Number unreported, British Pattern 1853 rifles, (.58 and .577 Cal)
- C — 34 British Pattern 1853 rifles, (.58 and .577 Cal)
- D — 34 British Pattern 1853 rifles, (.58 and .577 Cal)
- E — 35 British Pattern 1853 rifles, (.58 and .577 Cal)
- F — 38 British Pattern 1853 rifles, (.58 and .577 Cal)
- G — 57 British Pattern 1853 rifles, (.58 and .577 Cal)
- H — 50 British Pattern 1853 rifles, (.58 and .577 Cal)
- I — 32 British Pattern 1853 rifles, (.58 and .577 Cal)
- K — 58 British Pattern 1853 rifles, (.58 and .577 Cal)

Chancellorsville

- A — 52 British Pattern 1853 rifles, (.58 and .577 Cal)
- B — 51 British Pattern 1853 rifles, (.58 and .577 Cal)
- C — 43 British Pattern 1853 rifles, (.58 and .577 Cal)
- D — 55 British Pattern 1853 rifles, (.58 and .577 Cal)
- E — 44 British Pattern 1853 rifles, (.58 and .577 Cal)
- F — 58 British Pattern 1853 rifles, (.58 and .577 Cal)
- G — 67 British Pattern 1853 rifles, (.58 and .577 Cal)
- H — 57 British Pattern 1853 rifles, (.58 and .577 Cal)
- I — 50 British Pattern 1853 rifles, (.58 and .577 Cal)
- K — 53 British Pattern 1853 rifles, (.58 and .577 Cal)

Survey for Fourth Quarter, 31 December 1863

- A — 49 British Pattern 1853 rifles, (.58 and .577 Cal)
- B — Number unreported, British Pattern 1853 rifles, (.58 and .577 Cal)
- C — 58 British Pattern 1853 rifles, (.58 and .577 Cal)
- D — 54 British Pattern 1853 rifles, (.58 and .577 Cal)
- E — Number unreported, British Pattern 1853 rifles, (.58 and .577 Cal)
- F — 38 British Pattern 1853 rifles, (.58 and .577 Cal)
- G — 49 British Pattern 1853 rifles, (.58 and .577 Cal)
- H — 59 British Pattern 1853 rifles, (.58 and .577 Cal)
- I — 58 British Pattern 1853 rifles, (.58 and .577 Cal)
- K — 55 British Pattern 1853 rifles, (.58 and .577 Cal)

At siome point in 1864, the Ordnance Department had the 16th exchange their Enfieldarms for the standard muzzle-loading rifled musket of the Union Army, the Springfield Model 1861 Rifled Musket (Note: These Springfields were either National Armory (NA) or contact manufactured. In government records, National Armory refers to one of three United States Armory and Arsenals, the Springfield Armory, the Harpers Ferry Armory, and the Rock Island Arsenal. Rifle-muskets, muskets, and rifles were manufactured in Springfield and Harper's Ferry before the war. When the Rebels destroyed the Harpers Ferry Armory early in the American Civil War and stole the machinery for the Confederate central government-run Richmond Armory, the Springfield Armory was briefly the only government manufacturer of arms, until the Rock Island Arsenal was established in 1862. During this time production ramped up to unprecedented levels ever seen in American manufacturing up until that time, with only 9,601 rifles manufactured in 1860, rising to a peak of 276,200 by 1864. Any arms manufacturer awarded a contract had to follow strict guidelines to ensure interoperability between parts for both NA and commercially produced Springfields. awarded These advancements would not only give the Union a decisive technological advantage over the Confederacy during the war but served as a precursor to the mass production manufacturing that contributed to the post-war Second Industrial Revolution and 20th century machine manufacturing capabilities. American historian Merritt Roe Smith has drawn comparisons between the early assembly machining of the Springfield rifles and the later production of the Ford Model T, with the latter having considerably more parts, but producing a similar numbers of units in the earliest years of the 1913–1915 automobile assembly line, indirectly due to mass production manufacturing advancements pioneered by the armory 50 years earlier.). It fired a .58 inch Minie Ball. and came with a square socket bayonet. They would carry their Springfields until their end of service. They reported the following in survey

Survey for Fourth Quarter, 31 December 1864

- A — 78 Springfield Rifled Muskets, model 1855, 1861, NA and contract, (.58 Cal.)
- B — 38 Springfield Rifled Muskets, model 1855, 1861, NA and contract, (.58 Cal.}
- C — 50 Springfield Rifled Muskets, model 1855, 1861, NA and contract, (.58 Cal.)
- D — 55 Springfield Rifled Muskets, model 1855, 1861, NA and contract, (.58 Cal.); 2 P53 Enfield Rifled Muskets (.58 and .577 Cal.)
- E — 41 Springfield Rifled Muskets, model 1855, 1861, NA and contract, (.58 Cal.)
- F — 37 Springfield Rifled Muskets, model 1855, 1861, NA and contract, (.58 Cal.)
- G — 22 Springfield Rifled Muskets, model 1855, 1861, NA and contract, (.58 Cal.); 1 P53 Enfield Rifled Muskets (.58 and .577 Cal.)
- H — 34 Springfield Rifled Muskets, model 1855, 1861, NA and contract, (.58 Cal.)
- I — 44 Springfield Rifled Muskets, model 1855, 1861, NA and contract, (.58 Cal.)
- K — 26 Springfield Rifled Muskets, model 1855, 1861, NA and contract, (.58 Cal.); 3 P53 Enfield Rifled Muskets (.58 and .577 Cal.)
- Regimental stores - 89 Springfield Rifled Muskets, model 1855, 1861, NA and contract, (.58 Cal.)

=== Shoulder Arms Gallery ===
Issued weapons

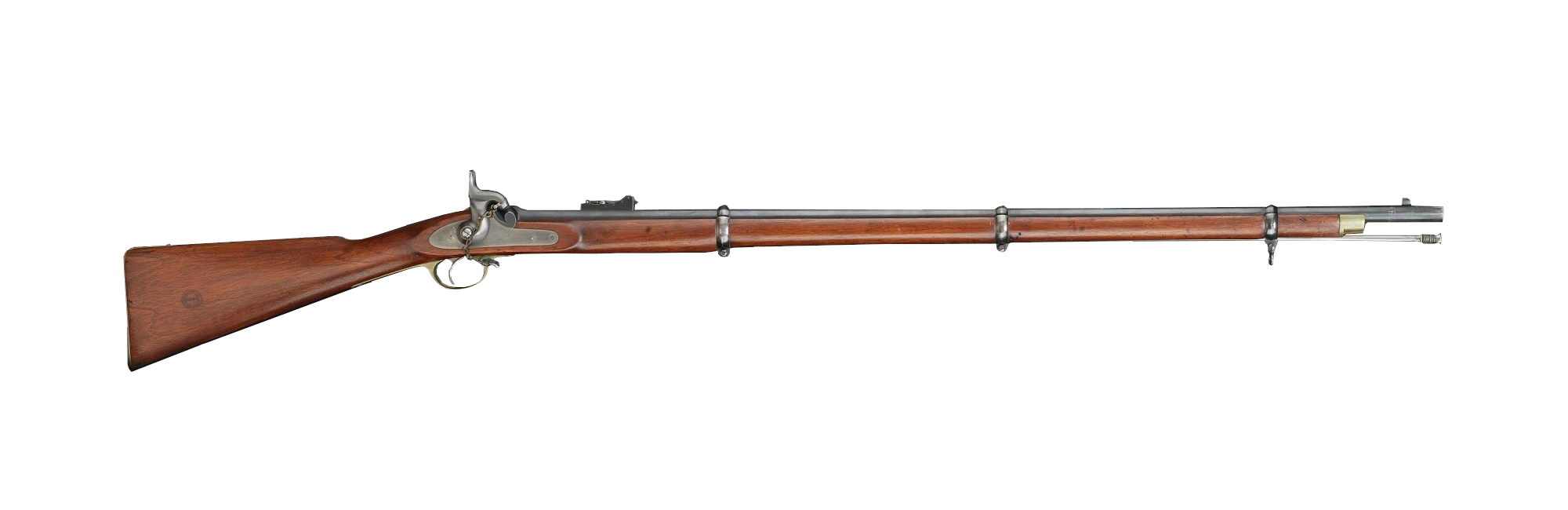
1853 Enfield rifle-musket

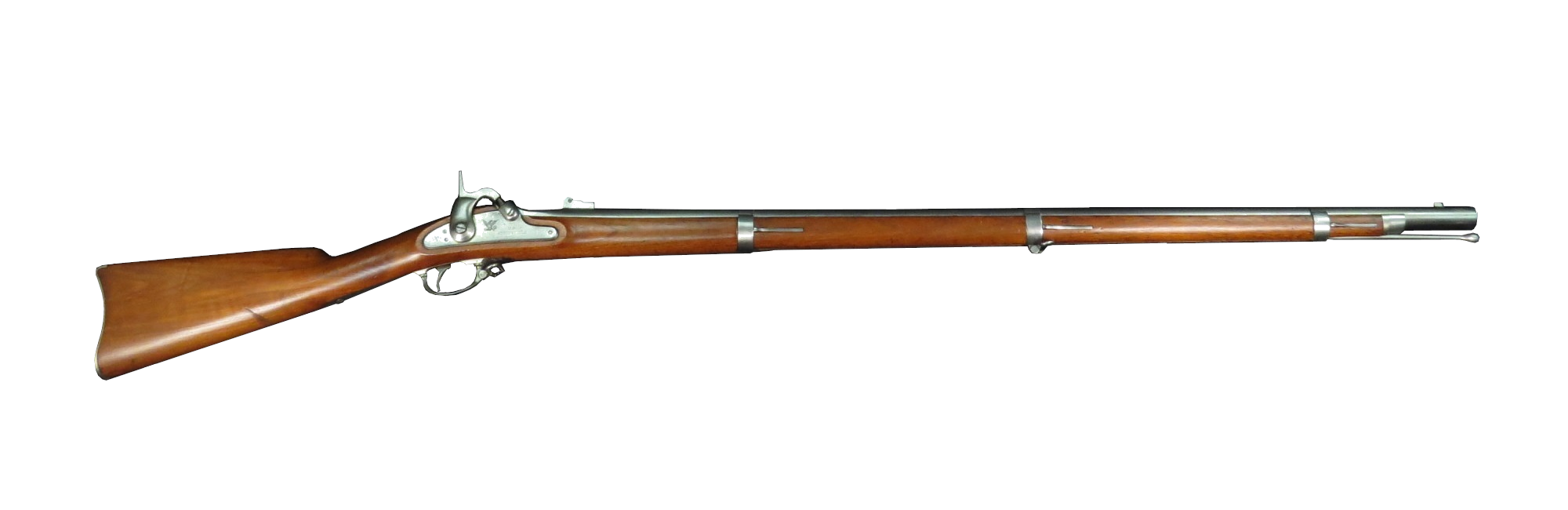
Springfield Model 1861

== Notable members ==
- Freeman Knowles (1846–1910), served as a corporal in the regiment; later became a U.S. Congressman from South Dakota, labor journalist, and activist.
- Wesley Webber (1841–1914), landscape and marine painter who sketched scenes of the war, including the surrender of Robert E. Lee at Appomattox Court House.

== See also ==
- List of Maine Civil War units
- Maine in the American Civil War
