= Raymond Fellows =

American judge (1885–1957)

Chief Justice of the Maine Supreme Judicial Court
- In office 1954–1956
- Appointed by: Burton M. Cross

Associate Justice of the Maine Supreme Judicial Court
- In office 1946–1954
- Appointed by: Horace Hildreth

Maine Attorney General
- In office 1925–1928
- Governor: Owen Brewster

Personal details
- Born: Raymond Fellows; October 17, 1885 Bucksport, Maine, U.S.
- Died: September 3, 1957 (aged 71) Bangor, Maine, U.S.
- Party: Republican
- Spouse: Madge Gilmore (m. 1909; died 1957)
- Children: 3
- Education: University of Maine College of Law (LLB)

Raymond Fellows (October 17, 1885 – September 3, 1957) was an American attorney, Republican politician, and jurist from Bucksport, Maine. He served as justice of the Maine Supreme Judicial Court from 1946 to 1956, including as chief justice from 1954 to 1956.

== Early life and education ==
Raymond Fellows was born on October 17, 1885, in Bucksport, Maine, to parents Oscar Fowler Fellows and Eva Marie Fling Fellows (née Fling). His father, Oscar, was an attorney and a Republican politician who served as speaker of the Maine House of Representatives from 1903 to 1904. His younger brother, Frank Fellows, served in the United States House of Representatives from 1941 until his death in 1954.

Fellows graduated from the University of Maine College of Law, earning a Bachelor of Laws (LL.B) in 1909.

== Legal and political career ==
Fellows served as Maine Attorney General from 1925 to 1928 during the administration of Governor Owen Brewster. In 1932, he chaired the Maine Republican State Committee in 1932.

In 1946, Governor Horace Hildreth appointed Fellows to the Maine Supreme Judicial Court. He served as an associate justice until 1954, when Governor Burton M. Cross elevated him to chief justice. Fellows held that position until 1956.

== Personal life and death ==
Fellows married Madge Gilmore, the daughter of Maine State Treasurer Pascal P. Gilmore, on April 11, 1909. Together they had two daughters and a son.

Fellows died on September 3, 1957, at a hospital in Bangor, Maine, aged 71.

Political offices
Preceded by Harry Manser	Justice of the Maine Supreme Judicial Court; 1946–1954	Succeeded by Walter M. Tapley
Preceded by Edward F. Merrill	Chief Justice of the Maine Supreme Judicial Court; 1954–1956	Succeeded by Robert B. Williamson
