= Bucksport, Maine =

Town in Maine, United States

- Town
- Bucksport from the south, 2026

- Seal

- Location within Maine Location within the United States
- Coordinates: 44°37′30″N 68°46′34″W
- Country: United States
- State: Maine
- County: Hancock
- Incorporated: 1792
- Villages: Bucksport; Bucksport Center; East Bucksport; Millvale; North Bucksport

Area
  - Total: 56.53 sq mi (146.41 km^{2})
  - Land: 51.54 sq mi (133.49 km^{2})
  - Water: 4.99 sq mi (12.92 km^{2})
- Elevation: 210 ft (64 m)

Population (2020)
  - Total: 4,944
  - Density: 96/sq mi (37/km^{2})
- Time zone: UTC-5 (Eastern (EST))
  - Summer (DST): UTC-4 (EDT)
- ZIP code: 04416
- Area code: 207
- GNIS feature ID: 582377
- Website: Town website

Bucksport is a historical town in Hancock County, Maine, United States. The population was 4,944 at the 2020 census. Bucksport is across the Penobscot River estuary from Fort Knox and the Penobscot Narrows Bridge, which replaced the Waldo–Hancock Bridge.

== History ==
The first inhabitants of Bucksport were a 5,000-year-old prehistoric culture known as the Red Paint People, that would later be referred to as the Maritime Archaic. They were thought to be a highly advanced native fishing culture that buried red paint in their graves along with stone tools and weapons. The first archaeological dig in the state of Maine, if not the entire United States, was initiated by Professor Charles Willoughby in 1891 on Indian Point, on a site where the present-day mill is located.

Once territory of the Tarrantine (now called Penobscot) Abenaki people, it was one of six townships granted by the Massachusetts General Court to Deacon David Marsh of Haverhill, Massachusetts, and 351 others. Colonel Jonathan Buck and a number of the grantees arrived in 1762 to survey the land, then returned to Haverhill. In June 1763, Buck came back to settle permanently what was known as Plantation No. 1, building a sawmill on Mill Creek, as well as a house and store. By 1775 the plantation had 21 families. Legend has it that Buck burned his mistress for being a witch, and that she promised to return and seek vengeance on the town. It is believed to be her foot and leg that appears on his tombstone, reappearing each time it has been replaced.

During the Revolutionary War, the British military built Fort George at Castine. On April 14, 1779, the stronghold became the site of a major American naval defeat called the Penobscot Expedition. The following day, when most of Plantation No. 1 was deserted, the 16-gun Royal Navy sloop HMS Nautilus anchored at the harbor. Its crew burned the town, sparing only those remaining inhabitants who swore allegiance to the Crown. But following the peace treaty of 1783, the town was resettled and called Buckstown Plantation after its founder. Incorporated on June 27, 1792, as Buckstown, it was renamed Bucksport in 1817. The town was occupied by the British during the War of 1812. In 1851, the East Maine Conference Seminary was opened by the Methodist Church as a preparatory school, but closed in 1933 when Bucksport opened its first public secondary school.

In 1780, the Jed Prouty Tavern and Inn was built in downtown Bucksport. It was expanded to a 17-room hotel around 1820. It is now being turned into a nursing home for the elderly.

Bucksport is also well known for its bizarre and fantastic stories. In 1892, a circus elephant named Charlie broke loose and roamed the town a free animal. He was finally captured, with the help of a pit bull, who cornered the elephant so his handlers could secure him.

On the evening of October 13, 1876, a triple homicide took place, leaving an old man named Robert Trim, his 32-year-old daughter Melissa Thayer, and Thayer's 4-year-old daughter Josie murdered and their family farm burned to the ground. The authorities soon arrested a sea captain despite the lack of witnesses, evidence or motive, and his trial was one of the biggest the young state had ever seen. The captain was found guilty and sentenced to life in Thomaston Prison.

In 1898, another notorious murder took place. A woman named Sarah Ware went missing on the evening of September 17, and her beheaded and badly decomposed body was discovered by a search party two weeks later near Miles Lane. A man named William Treworgy was eventually tried for the murder but was acquitted, and the case was never solved.

Bucksport is depicted in the 1960s ABC television series Dark Shadows, as located near the fictional town of Collinsport. Bucksport's history and reputation were rumored to be the predominant inspirations for the fictional Collinsport several years before the writers of the serial incorporated Bucksport into the storyline.

The town's terrain is uneven, riven with ponds and streams. Farmers grew hay and potatoes. Shipbuilding, however, would become the principal occupation. Many worked at fisheries, sailing to the Grand Banks for their catch. Other industries produced lumber, ships' pumps, blocks, plugs, wedges and wheels, boats, barrels, carriages, leather, boots and shoes and stone work. In 1874, the Bucksport and Bangor Railroad was completed. It provided Bangor with shipping access to Penobscot Bay during winter months when the Penobscot River froze.

The Maine Seaboard Paper Company in 1930 opened the Bucksport Mill, a paper mill with two machines which manufactured 300 tons of newsprint per day. Until 2014 it was owned successively by Time, Inc., St. Regis Paper Company, Champion International, International Paper, and Verso Paper. It held 4 machines with a capacity to manufacture 482,800 tons annually. On October 1, 2014, it was announced by Verso that they would be closing the mill, effective on December 1, laying off 570 workers.

On February 22, 2018, Whole Oceans Aquaculture announced their intent to purchase the site of the former Verso paper mill and convert it into a 400 million gallon recirculating aquaculture system facility for land-based Atlantic Salmon production. The facility is expected to cost an initial 75 million dollars and bring up to 250 million dollars in investment to the area. Up to 200 full-time workers are expected to be employed. Whole Oceans expects to break ground in Fall of 2018 and reach a capacity of 25,000 tons of salmon within fifteen years.

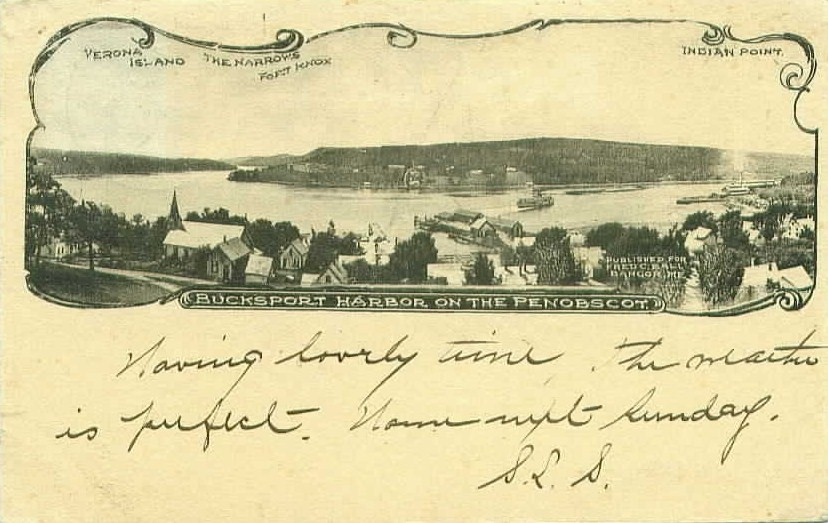
Bucksport Harbor in 1905

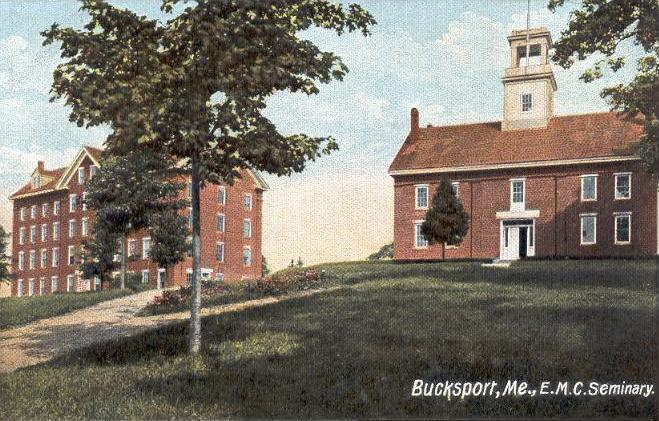
E. M. C. Seminary c. 1907

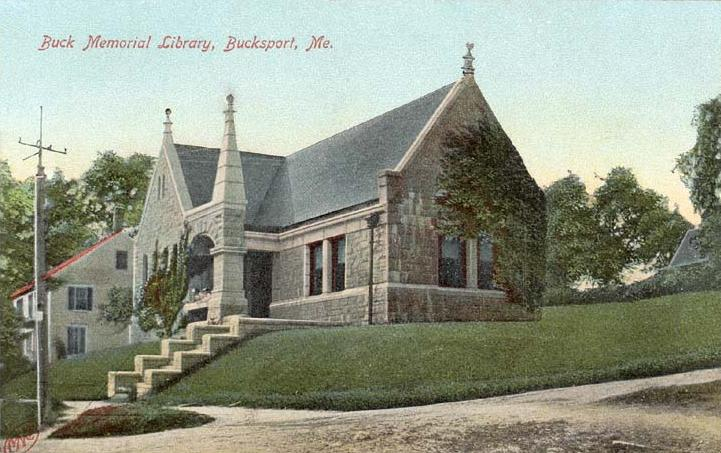
Buck Mem. Library c. 1908

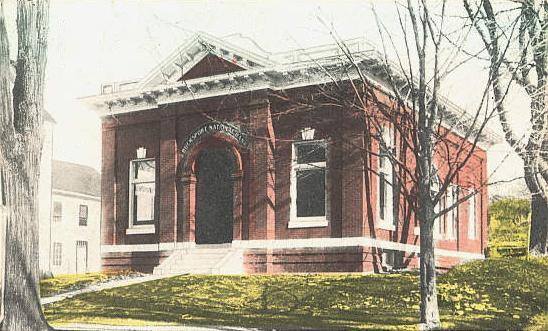
Bucksport Bank c. 1910

== Geography ==
According to the United States Census Bureau, the town has a total area of 56.53 square miles (146.41 km^{2}), of which 51.54 square miles (133.49 km^{2}) is land and 4.99 square miles (12.92 km^{2}) is water. Located at the head of Penobscot Bay, Bucksport is drained by the Penobscot River. It includes Silver Lake, a recreation, fishing and birdwatching site.

The town is crossed by U. S. Route 1 and state routes 3, 15 and 46. It borders the towns of Orrington and Holden to the north, Dedham and Orland to the east, and (separated by the Penobscot River) Verona to the south, and Prospect, Frankfort and Winterport to the west.

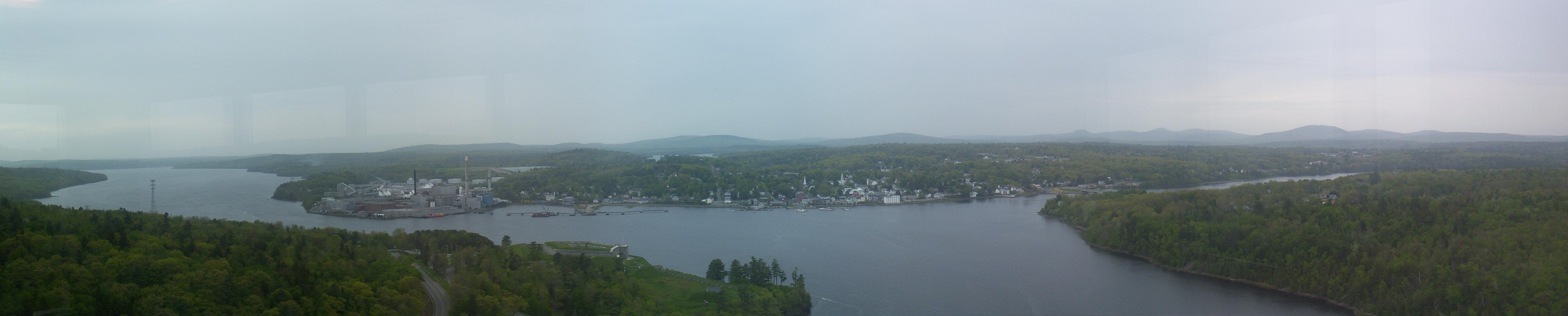
Bucksport from the top of the Penobscot Narrows Bridge

== Demographics ==
Historical population
Census	Pop.	Note	%±
1800	624		—
1810	1,403		124.8%
1820	1,658		18.2%
1830	2,237		34.9%
1840	3,015		34.8%
1850	3,381		12.1%
1860	3,554		5.1%
1870	3,433		−3.4%
1880	3,047		−11.2%
1890	2,921		−4.1%
1900	2,339		−19.9%
1910	2,216		−5.3%
1920	1,906		−14.0%
1930	2,135		12.0%
1940	2,927		37.1%
1950	3,102		6.0%
1960	3,466		11.7%
1970	3,756		8.4%
1980	4,345		15.7%
1990	4,825		11.0%
2000	4,908		1.7%
2010	4,924		0.3%
2020	4,944		0.4%
U.S. Decennial Census

See also Bucksport (CDP), Maine.

=== 2010 census ===
As of the census of 2010, there were 4,924 people, 2,135 households, and 1,363 families living in the town. The population density was 95.5 inhabitants per square mile (36.9/km^{2}). There were 2,551 housing units at an average density of 49.5 per square mile (19.1/km^{2}). The racial makeup of the town was 97.2% White, 0.5% African American, 0.3% Native American, 0.3% Asian, 0.3% from other races, and 1.3% from two or more races. Hispanic or Latino of any race were 1.3% of the population.

There were 2,135 households, of which 27.7% had children under the age of 18 living with them, 49.7% were married couples living together, 10.3% had a female householder with no husband present, 3.9% had a male householder with no wife present, and 36.2% were non-families. 30.0% of all households were made up of individuals, and 11.6% had someone living alone who was 65 years of age or older. The average household size was 2.30 and the average family size was 2.83.

The median age in the town was 43.3 years. 20.7% of residents were under the age of 18; 7% were between the ages of 18 and 24; 24.2% were from 25 to 44; 33% were from 45 to 64; and 14.9% were 65 years of age or older. The gender makeup of the town was 48.4% male and 51.6% female.

=== 2000 census ===
As of the census of 2000, there were 4,908 people, 2,049 households, and 1,360 families living in the town. The population density was 95.2 inhabitants per square mile (36.8/km^{2}). There were 2,282 housing units at an average density of 44.3 per square mile (17.1/km^{2}). The racial makeup of the town was 98.06% White, 0.08% Black or African American, 0.31% Native American, 0.16% Asian, 0.06% Pacific Islander, 0.14% from other races, and 1.18% from two or more races. Hispanic or Latino of any race were 0.88% of the population.

There were 2,049 households, out of which 32.0% had children under the age of 18 living with them, 52.6% were married couples living together, 9.8% had a female householder with no husband present, and 33.6% were non-families. 27.3% of all households were made up of individuals, and 11.9% had someone living alone who was 65 years of age or older. The average household size was 2.38 and the average family size was 2.87.

In the town, the population was spread out, with 25.0% under the age of 18, 7.4% from 18 to 24, 29.3% from 25 to 44, 24.7% from 45 to 64, and 13.5% who were 65 years of age or older. The median age was 38 years. For every 100 females, there were 92.9 males. For every 100 females age 18 and over, there were 86.1 males.

The median income for a household in the town was $34,812, and the median income for a family was $41,818. Males had a median income of $35,067 versus $22,739 for females. The per capita income for the town was $17,587. About 9.4% of families and 10.8% of the population were below the poverty line, including 12.8% of those under age 18 and 9.1% of those age 65 or over.

== Sites of interest ==
- Bucksport High School
- Bucksport Railroad Station (now Bucksport Historical Society Museum)
- The Alamo Theater and Northeast Historic Film study center and film archive

== Notable people ==
- Carl Darling Buck, philologist
- Dustin Farnum, actor
- William Farnum, actor
- Frank Fellows, US congressman
- Edward Winslow Hinks, Civil War era general
- Molly Kool, America's first registered female ship captain
- Kimberley Rosen, state representative
- Richard Rosen, state senator
- Edward Vernon Sparhawk, writer and newspaper editor
- William Pierce Stubbs, artist
- Dora Wiley, singer
