= Franz U. Burkett =

American lawyer and politician (1887–1961)

Franz Upham Burkett (October 24, 1887 – January 23, 1961) was an American lawyer and politician from Maine. A Republican from Portland, he served five terms in the Maine Legislature, including four in the Maine House of Representatives (1929 – 1934; 1951 – 1952} and one in the Maine Senate (1935 – 1936). During the 1933 – 1934 session, he was elected Speaker of the Maine House of Representatives. From 1937 – 1940, he served as Maine Attorney General.

Burkett was born in Union, Maine as the son of Fred E. Burkett and Lina M. Upham Burkett. His father was a member of the Maine House of Representatives. He attended Maine Wesleyan Seminary and graduated from Bowdoin College in 1911. He then worked as a teacher at Union High School before studying at the University of Maine School of Law. There he earned a Bachelor of Laws in 1916. After graduation, he served as a lieutenant in the First World War. After returning from the war, Burkett practiced law in Cumberland County. In 1929, both he and his father were elected to the House of Representatives, which was the first time a father and son had served concurrently.
