= Maine Attorney General =

American state official

- Flag of the State of Maine
- Incumbent; Aaron Frey since January 2, 2019
- Style: Mr. Attorney General (informal); The Honorable (formal)
- Seat: Burton M. Cross Building; Augusta, Maine
- Appointer: State legislature
- Term length: 2 years
- Formation: March 15, 1820
- First holder: Erastus Foote
- Deputy: Deputy Attorney General
- Salary: $143,499
- Website: www.maine.gov/ag/

The Maine attorney general is the chief legal advisor and prosecutor of the state of Maine. The constitutional basis of the office is Article IX, Section 11 of the Maine Constitution, and the holder of the position is chosen biennially by the Maine Legislature in joint session. Maine is the only state to select its attorney general in such a manner; in 2023 a group of state Republicans called for the attorney general to be selected by popular vote, though no action was taken on the proposal.

The powers of the attorney general are derived from the Maine Revised Statues Annotated, Title 5, Chapter 9. These include representing the state in civil actions, investigating and prosecuting homicides, advising district attorneys, and providing written opinions on matters of law at the request of the governor or the legislature. The attorney general is empowered to appoint deputy and assistant attorneys general, who serve at the attorney general's pleasure.

== List of Maine attorneys general ==
| No. | Image | Name | Hometown | Took office | Left office | Party |
|---|---|---|---|---|---|---|
| 1 | | Erastus Foote | Wiscasset | 1820 | 1831 | Democratic-Republican |
| 2 | | Jonathan P. Rogers | Bangor | 1832 | 1833 | Democratic |
| 3 | | Nathan Clifford | Newfield | 1834 | 1837 | Democratic |
| 4 | | Daniel Goodenow | Alfred | 1838 | 1838 | Democratic |
| 5 | | Stephen Emery | Paris | 1839 | 1840 | Democratic |
| 6 | | Daniel Goodenow | Alfred | 1841 | 1841 | Democratic |
| 7 | | Otis L. Bridges | Calais | 1842 | 1843 | Democratic |
| 8 | | Wyman B. S. Moor | Waterville | 1844 | 1847 | Democratic |
| 9 | | Samuel H. Blake | Bangor | 1848 | 1848 | Democratic |
| 10 | | Henry Tallman | Bath | 1849 | 1852 | Democratic |
| 11 | | George Evans | Portland | 1853 | 1854 | Whig |
| 12 | | John S. Abbott | Norridgewock | 1855 | 1855 | Republican |
| 13 | | George Evans | Portland | 1856 | 1856 | Whig |
| 14 | | Nathan D. Appleton | Alfred | 1857 | 1859 | |
| 15 | | G.W. Ingersoll | Bangor | 1860 | 1860 | |
| 16 | | Josiah Hayden Drummond | Portland | 1860 | 1863 | Republican |
| 17 | | John A. Peters | Bangor | 1864 | 1866 | Republican |
| 18 | | William P. Frye | Lewiston | 1867 | 1869 | Republican |
| 19 | | Thomas Brackett Reed | Portland | 1870 | 1872 | Republican |
| 20 | | Harris M. Plaisted | Bangor | 1873 | 1875 | Republican |
| 21 | | Lucilius A. Emery | Ellsworth | 1876 | 1878 | Republican |
| 22 | | William H. McLellan | Belfast | 1879 | 1879 | Democratic |
| 23 | | Henry B. Cleaves | Portland | 1880 | 1884 | Republican |
| 24 | | Orville D. Baker | Augusta | 1885 | 1888 | Republican |
| 25 | | Charles E. Littlefield | Rockland | 1889 | 1892 | Republican |
| 26 | | Frederick A. Powers | Houlton | 1893 | 1896 | Republican |
| 27 | | William T. Haines | Waterville | 1897 | 1900 | Republican |
| 28 | | George M. Seiders | Portland | 1901 | 1904 | Republican |
| 29 | | Hannibal Emery Hamlin | Ellsworth | 1905 | 1908 | Republican |
| 30 | | Warren C. Philbrook | Waterville | 1909 | 1910 | Republican |
| 31 | | Cyrus R. Tupper | Boothbay Harbor | 1911 | 1911 | Democratic |
| 32 | | William Robinson Pattangall | Waterville | 1911 | 1912 | Democratic |
| 33 | | Scott Wilson | Portland | 1913 | 1914 | Republican |
| 34 | | William Robinson Pattangall | Waterville | 1915 | 1916 | Democratic |
| 35 | | Guy H. Sturgis | Portland | 1917 | 1920 | Republican |
| 36 | | Ransford W. Shaw | Houlton | 1921 | 1924 | Republican |
| 37 | | Raymond Fellows | Bangor | 1925 | 1928 | Republican |
| 38 | | Clement F. Robinson | Portland | 1929 | 1932 | Republican |
| 39 | | Clyde R. Chapman | Belfast | 1933 | 1936 | Republican |
| 40 | | Franz U. Burkett | Portland | 1937 | 1940 | Republican |
| 41 | | Frank I. Cowan | Portland | 1941 | 1944 | Republican |
| 42 | | Ralph W. Farris | Augusta | 1945 | 1950 | Republican |
| 43 | | Alexander A. LaFleur | Portland | 1951 | 1954 | Republican |
| 44 | | Frank F. Harding | Rockland | 1955 | 1958 | Republican |
| 45 | | Frank E. Hancock | York | 1959 | 1964 | Republican |
| 46 | | Richard J. Dubord | Waterville | 1965 | 1966 | Democratic |
| 47 | | James S. Erwin | York | 1967 | 1971 | Republican |
| 48 | | Jon A. Lund | Augusta | 1972 | 1975 | Republican |
| 49 | | Joseph E. Brennan | Portland | 1975 | 1979 | Democratic |
| 50 | | Richard S. Cohen | Augusta | 1979 | 1981 | Republican |
| 51 | | James E. Tierney | Lisbon Falls | 1981 | 1991 | Democratic |
| 52 | | Michael E. Carpenter | Houlton | 1991 | 1995 | Democratic |
| 53 | | Andrew Ketterer | Madison | 1995 | 2001 | Democratic |
| 54 | | G. Steven Rowe | Portland | 2001 | 2009 | Democratic |
| 55 | | Janet Mills | Farmington | 2009 | 2011 | Democratic |
| 56 | | William Schneider | Durham | 2011 | 2013 | Republican |
| 57 | | Janet Mills | Farmington | 2013 | 2019 | Democratic |
| 58 | | Aaron Frey | Bangor | 2019 | present | Democratic |
