= List of justices of the Maine Supreme Judicial Court =

The following tables list the terms of all Maine Supreme Judicial Court justices in their order of appointment to serve on the Court.

== Chief justices ==
#	Judge	Lifespan	Residence	Began service	Ended service	Reason for termination	Appointed by	Re-appointed by
1	Prentiss Mellen	1764–1840	Portland	July 1, 1820	October 11, 1834	mandatory retirement	William King	
2	Nathan Weston	1782–1872	Augusta	October 22, 1834	October 22, 1841	term expired	Robert P. Dunlap	
3	Ezekiel Whitman	1776–1866	Portland	December 10, 1841	October 23, 1848	resigned	Edward Kent	
4	Ether Shepley	1789–1877	Saco	October 23, 1848	October 22, 1855	term expired	John W. Dana	
5	John S. Tenney	1793–1869	Norridgewock	October 23, 1855	October 23, 1862	term expired	Anson Morrill	
6	John Appleton	1804–1891	Bangor	October 24, 1862	September 19, 1883	term expired	Israel Washburn Jr.	Joshua Chamberlain; Seldon Connor
7	John A. Peters	1822–1904	Bangor	September 20, 1883	January 1, 1900	resignation	Frederick Robie	Edwin C. Burleigh; Llewellyn Powers
8	Andrew P. Wiswell	1852–1906	Ellsworth	January 2, 1900	December 4, 1906	death	Llewellyn Powers	
9	Lucilius A. Emery	1840–1920	Ellsworth	December 14, 1906	July 26, 1911	resignation	William T. Cobb	
10	William Penn Whitehouse	1842–1922	Augusta	July 26, 1911	April 8, 1913	resignation	Frederick W. Plaisted	
11	Albert R. Savage	1847–1917	Auburn	April 9, 1913	June 14, 1917	death	William T. Haines	
12	Leslie C. Cornish	1854–1925	Augusta	June 25, 1917	March 1, 1925	resignation	Carl Milliken	Percival P. Baxter
13	Scott Wilson	1870–1942	Portland	March 1, 1925	October 7, 1929	elevation to the 1st Cir.	Owen Brewster	
14	Luere B. Deasy	1859–1940	Bar Harbor	October 12, 1929	February 7, 1930	resignation	William Tudor Gardiner	
15	William Robinson Pattangall	1865–1942	Augusta	February 7, 1930	July 16, 1935	resignation	William Tudor Gardiner	
16	Charles J. Dunn	1872–1939	Orono	July 18, 1935	November 10, 1939	death	Louis J. Brann	
17	Charles P. Barnes	1869–1951	Houlton	November 21, 1939	July 31, 1940	resignation	Lewis O. Barrows	
18	Guy H. Sturgis	1877–1951	Portland	August 8, 1940	March 8, 1949	retirement	Lewis O. Barrows	Horace Hildreth
19	Harold H. Murchie	1888–1953	Calais	March 8, 1949	March 7, 1953	death	Frederick G. Payne	
20	Edward F. Merrill	1883–1962	Skowhegan	March 18, 1953	April 7, 1954	resignation	Nathaniel M. Haskell	
21	Raymond Fellows	1885–1957	Bangor	April 7, 1954	September 15, 1956	resignation	Burton M. Cross	
22	Robert B. Williamson	1899–1976	Augusta	October 4, 1956	August 21, 1970	resignation	Edmund Muskie	John H. Reed
23	Armand A. Dufresne Jr.	1909–1994	Lewiston	September 3, 1970	September 3, 1977	term expired	Kenneth M. Curtis	
24	Vincent L. McKusick	1921–2014	Cape Elizabeth	September 16, 1977	February 28, 1992	resignation	James B. Longley	Joseph E. Brennan
25	Daniel Wathen	1939–	Augusta	March 20, 1992	October 4, 2001	resignation	John R. McKernan Jr.	Angus King
26	Leigh Saufley	1954–	Portland	December 6, 2001	April 14, 2020	retirement	Angus King	John Baldacci; Paul LePage
27	Valerie Stanfill	1957/58–	Wayne	June 8, 2021	–	–	Janet Mills	–

== Associate justices ==
#	Judge	Lifespan	Residence	Began service	Ended service	Reason for termination	Appointed by	Re-appointed by
1	William Pitt Preble	1783–1857	Portland	July 1, 1820	June 18, 1828	resignation	William King	
2	Nathan Weston	1782–1872	Augusta	July 1, 1820	October 22, 1834	elevation to Chief Justice	William King	
3	Albion Parris	1788–1857	Portland	June 25, 1828	August 20, 1836	resignation	Enoch Lincoln	
4	Nicholas Emery	1776–1861	Portland	October 22, 1834	October 21, 1841	term expired	Robert P. Dunlap	
5	Ether Shepley	1789–1877	Saco	September 23, 1836	October 23, 1848	elevation to Chief Justice	Robert P. Dunlap	Edward Kavanagh
6	John S. Tenney	1793–1869	Norridgewock	October 23, 1841	October 23, 1855	elevation to Chief Justice	Edward Kent	John W. Dana
7	Samuel Wells	1801–1868	Portland	September 28, 1847	March 31, 1854	resignation	John W. Dana	
8	Joseph Howard	1800–1877	Portland	October 23, 1848	October 22, 1855	term expired	John W. Dana	
9	Richard D. Rice	1810–1882	Augusta	May 11, 1852	December 1, 1863	resignation	John Hubbard	Lot M. Morrill
10	John Appleton	1804–1891	Bangor	May 11, 1852	October 24, 1862	elevation to Chief Justice	John Hubbard	Lot M. Morrill
11	Joshua W. Hathaway	1797–1862	Bangor	May 11, 1852	May 10, 1859	term expired	John Hubbard	
12	Jonas Cutting	1800–1876	Bangor	April 20, 1854	April 20, 1875	term expired	William G. Crosby	Israel Washburn Jr. Joshua Chamberlain
13	Seth May	1802–1881	Winthrop	May 6, 1855	May 7, 1862	term expired	Anson Morrill	
14	Woodbury Davis	1818–1871	Portland	October 10, 1855; February 25, 1857	April 11, 1856; December 12, 1865	removal by address resignation	Anson Morrill; Hannibal Hamlin	Samuel Cony
15	Daniel Goodenow	1793–1863	Alfred	October 10, 1855	October 10, 1862	term expired	Anson Morrill	
16	Edward Kent	1802–1877	Bangor	May 11, 1859	May 11, 1873	term expired	Lot M. Morrill	Samuel Cony
17	Charles W. Walton	1819–1900	Deering	May 14, 1862	May 14, 1897	term expired	Israel Washburn Jr.	Joshua Chamberlain; Seldon Connor; Frederick Robie; Edwin C. Burleigh
18	Jonathan G. Dickerson	1811–1878	Belfast	October 24, 1862	September 1, 1878	death	Israel Washburn Jr.	Joshua Chamberlain; Seldon Connor
19	Edward Fox	1815–1881	Portland	October 24, 1862	March 27, 1863	resignation	Israel Washburn Jr.	
20	William G. Barrows	1821–1886	Brunswick	March 27, 1863	March 24, 1884	term expired	Abner Coburn	Joshua Chamberlain; Seldon Connor
21	Charles Danforth	1815–1890	Gardiner	January 5, 1864	March 30, 1890	death	Samuel Cony	Sidney Perham; Seldon Connor; Frederick Robie
22	Rufus P. Tapley	1823–1893	Saco	December 21, 1865	December 21, 1872	term expired	Samuel Cony	
23	William Wirt Virgin	1823–1893	Portland	December 26, 1872	January 23, 1893	death	Sidney Perham	Alonzo Garcelon; Frederick Robie
24	John A. Peters	1822–1904	Bangor	May 20, 1873	September 20, 1883	elevation to Chief Justice	Sidney Perham	Seldon Connor
25	Artemas Libbey	1823–1894	Augusta	April 24, 1875; January 11, 1883	April 23, 1882; March 15, 1894	term expired death	Nelson Dingley Jr. Frederick Robie	Edwin C. Burleigh
26	Joseph W. Symonds	1840–1918	Portland	October 16, 1878	March 31, 1884	resignation	Seldon Connor	
27	Lucilius A. Emery	1840–1920	Ellsworth	October 5, 1883	December 14, 1906	elevation to Chief Justice	Frederick Robie	Edwin C. Burleigh; Llewellyn Powers; John Fremont Hill
28	Enoch Foster	1839–1913	Bethel	March 24, 1884	March 24, 1898	term expired	Frederick Robie	Edwin C. Burleigh
29	Thomas H. Haskell	1842–1900	Portland	March 31, 1884	September 24, 1900	death	Frederick Robie	Edwin C. Burleigh; Llewellyn Powers
30	William Penn Whitehouse	1842–1922	Augusta	April 15, 1890	July 26, 1911	elevation to Chief Justice	Edwin C. Burleigh	Llewellyn Powers; John Fremont Hill; Frederick W. Plaisted
31	Andrew P. Wiswell	1852–1906	Ellsworth	April 10, 1893	January 2, 1900	elevation to Chief Justice	Henry B. Cleaves	
32	Sewall C. Strout	1827–1914	Portland	April 12, 1894	April 12, 1908	term expired	Henry B. Cleaves	John Fremont Hill
33	Albert R. Savage	1847–1913	Auburn	May 15, 1897	April 9, 1913	elevation to Chief Justice	Llewellyn Powers	John Fremont Hill; Frederick W. Plaisted
34	William H. Fogler	1837–1902	Rockland	March 25, 1898	February 18, 1902	death	Llewellyn Powers	
35	Frederick A. Powers	1855–1824	Houlton	January 2, 1900	March 31, 1907	resignation	Llewellyn Powers	William T. Cobb
36	Henry C. Peabody	1838–1911	Portland	November 29, 1900	March 29, 1911	death	Llewellyn Powers	William T. Cobb
37	Albert Spear	1852–1929	Gardiner	March 1, 1902; June 25, 1917	March 1, 1916; June 25, 1923	term expired term expired	John Fremont Hill; Carl Milliken	Bert M. Fernald
38	Charles F. Woodard	1848–1907	Bangor	December 14, 1906	June 17, 1907	death	William T. Cobb	
39	Leslie C. Cornish	1854–1925	Augusta	March 31, 1907	June 25, 1917	elevation to Chief Justice	William T. Cobb	William T. Haines
40	Arno W. King	1855–1918	Ellsworth	June 28, 1907	July 21, 1918	death	William T. Cobb	William T. Haines
41	George E. Bird	1847–1926	Portland	April 13, 1908	August 29, 1918	retirement	William T. Cobb	Oakley C. Curtis
42	George F. Haley	1856–1918	Biddeford	April 12, 1911	February 19, 1918	death	Frederick W. Plaisted	
43	George M. Hanson	1856–1924	Calais	July 26, 1911	April 4, 1924	death	Frederick W. Plaisted	Carl Milliken
44	Warren C. Philbrook	1857–1933	Waterville	April 9, 1913	November 29, 1928	retirement	William T. Haines	Carl Milliken; Owen Brewster
45	John B. Madigan	1863–1918	Houlton	March 1, 1916	January 19, 1918	death	Oakley C. Curtis	
46	Charles J. Dunn	1872–1939	Orono	February 6, 1918	July 18, 1935	elevation to Chief Justice	Carl Milliken	Owen Brewster; William Tudor Gardiner
47	John A. Morrill	1855–1945	Auburn	March 5, 1918	May 31, 1926	retirement	Carl Milliken	Owen Brewster
48	Scott Wilson	1870–1942	Portland	August 17, 1918	March 1, 1925	elevation to Chief Justice	Carl Milliken	
49	Luere B. Deasy	1859–1940	Bar Harbor	September 25, 1918	October 12, 1929	elevation to Chief Justice	Carl Milliken	Owen Brewster
50	Guy H. Sturgis	1877–1951	Portland	August 13, 1923	August 8, 1940	elevation to Chief Justice	Percival P. Baxter	William Tudor Gardiner; Lewis O. Barrows
51	Charles P. Barnes	1869–1951	Houlton	April 17, 1924	November 21, 1939	elevation to Chief Justice	Percival P. Baxter	William Tudor Gardiner; Lewis O. Barrows
52	Norman L. Bassett	1869–1931	Augusta	March 26, 1925	September 9, 1930	resignation	Owen Brewster	
53	William Robinson Pattangall	1865–1942	Augusta	July 2, 1926	February 7, 1930	elevation to Chief Justice	Owen Brewster	
54	Frank G. Farrington	1872–1933	Augusta	November 16, 1928	September 3, 1933	death	Owen Brewster	
55	Sidney St. Felix Thaxter	1883–1958	Portland	September 16, 1930	February 28, 1954	retirement	William Tudor Gardiner	Lewis O. Barrows; Sumner Sewall; Frederick G. Payne
56	James H. Hudson	1878–1947	Guilford	November 20, 1933	August 21, 1947	death	Louis J. Brann	Lewis O. Barrows
57	Harry Manser	1874–1955	Auburn	July 18, 1935	March 20, 1946	retirement	Louis J. Brann	Sumner Sewall
58	George H. Worster	1871–1965	Bangor	December 21, 1939	July 31, 1942	resignation	Lewis O. Barrows	
59	Harold H. Murchie	1888–1953	Calais	August 8, 1940	March 3, 1949	elevation to Chief Justice	Lewis O. Barrows	Horace Hildreth
60	Arthur Chapman	1873–1959	Portland	November 4, 1942	July 27, 1945	retirement	Sumner Sewall	
61	Nathaniel Tompkins	1879–1949	Houlton	July 27, 1945	April 22, 1949	death	Horace Hildreth	
62	Raymond Fellows	1885–1957	Bangor	May 1, 1946	April 7, 1954	elevation to Chief Justice	Horace Hildreth	Burton M. Cross
63	Edward P. Murray	1876–1966	Bangor	September 18, 1947	April 6, 1948	retirement	Horace Hildreth	
64	Edward F. Merrill	1883–1962	Skowhegan	June 2, 1948	March 18, 1953	elevation to Chief Justice	Horace Hildreth	
65	William B. Nulty	1888–1953	Portland	March 16, 1949	September 11, 1953	death	Frederick G. Payne	
66	Robert B. Williamson	1899–1976	Augusta	May 5, 1949	October 4, 1956	elevation to Chief Justice	Frederick G. Payne	Edmund Muskie
67	Frank A. Tirrell	1893–1955	Camden	March 18, 1953	June 4, 1955	death	Burton M. Cross	
68	Donald W. Webber	1906–1995	Auburn	October 8, 1953	July 31, 1973	resignation	Burton M. Cross	John H. Reed; Kenneth M. Curtis
69	Albert Beliveau	1887–1971	Rumford	March 3, 1954	March 25, 1958	resignation	Burton M. Cross	
70	Walter M. Tapley	1898–1971	Portland	May 5, 1954	June 30, 1969	resignation	Burton M. Cross	John H. Reed; Kenneth M. Curtis
71	Percy T. Clarke	1885–1957	Ellsworth	June 30, 1955	June 15, 1956	retirement	Edmund Muskie	
72	F. Harold Dubord	1891–1964	Waterville	October 4, 1956	December 10, 1962	resignation	Edmund Muskie	
73	Francis W. Sullivan	1894–1967	Portland	October 4, 1956	July 10, 1965	resignation	Edmund Muskie	John H. Reed
74	Cecil J. Siddall	1894–1986	Sanford	May 7, 1958	February 27, 1965	resignation	Edmund Muskie	
75	Harold C. Marden	1900–1994	Waterville	December 19, 1962	November 15, 1970	resignation	John H. Reed	Kenneth M. Curtis
76	Abraham M. Rudman	1896–1970	Bangor	March 30, 1965	December 14, 1966	resignation	John H. Reed	
77	Armand A. Dufresne Jr.	1909–1994	Lewiston	August 25, 1965	September 3, 1970	elevation to Chief Justice	John H. Reed	
78	Randolph Weatherbee	1907–1976	Bangor	December 21, 1966	May 20, 1976	death	John H. Reed	Kenneth M. Curtis
79	Charles A. Pomeroy	1914–1993	Windham	July 21, 1969	January 1, 1980	resignation	Kenneth M. Curtis	James B. Longley
80	Sidney W. Wernick	1913–1995	Portland	September 30, 1970	August 24, 1981	retirement	Kenneth M. Curtis	James B. Longley
81	James Archibald	1912–2006	Houlton	January 27, 1971	January 1, 1980	retirement	Kenneth M. Curtis	James B. Longley
82	Thomas E. Delahanty	1914–1985	Lewiston	September 5, 1973	August 31, 1983	retirement	Kenneth M. Curtis	Joseph E. Brennan
83	Edward S. Godfrey	1913–2005	Portland	September 1, 1976	September 1, 1983	term expired	James B. Longley	
84	David A. Nichols	1917–1997	Lincolnville	May 24, 1977	May 31, 1988	resignation	James B. Longley	Joseph E. Brennan
85	Harry P. Glassman	1928–1981	Portland	August 31, 1979	May 15, 1981	death	Joseph E. Brennan	
86	David G. Roberts	1928–1999	Bangor	January 11, 1980	August 31, 1998	retirement	Joseph E. Brennan	John R. McKernan Jr. (x2)
87	Gene Carter	1935–2021	Bangor	September 15, 1980	July 5, 1983	elevation to the D. Me.	Joseph E. Brennan	
88	Elmer H. Violette	1921–2000	Van Buren	August 31, 1981	August 1, 1986	retirement	Joseph E. Brennan	
89	Daniel Wathen	1939–	Augusta	August 31, 1981	March 20, 1992	elevation to Chief Justice	Joseph E. Brennan	John R. McKernan Jr.
90	Caroline Duby Glassman	1922–2013	Portland	August 30, 1983	August 29, 1997	term expired	Joseph E. Brennan	John R. McKernan Jr.
91	Louis Scolnik	1923–2024	Lewiston	September 7, 1983	August 1, 1988	resignation	Joseph E. Brennan	
92	Robert W. Clifford	1937–	Lewiston	August 1, 1986	August 31, 2009	retirement	Joseph E. Brennan	John R. McKernan Jr. Angus King; John Baldacci
93	D. Brock Hornby	1944–	Cape Elizabeth	June 10, 1988	May 7, 1990	elevation to the D. Me.	John R. McKernan Jr.	
94	Samuel Collins	1923–2012	Rockland	September 16, 1988	April 15, 1994	retirement	John R. McKernan Jr.	
95	Morton A. Brody	1933–2000	Waterville	June 6, 1990	August 8, 1991	elevation to the D. Me.	John R. McKernan Jr.	
96	Paul L. Rudman	1935–2024	Bangor	June 5, 1992	July 1, 2005	resignation	John R. McKernan Jr.	Angus King
97	Howard H. Dana Jr.	1940–	Cape Elizabeth	March 4, 1993	March 2, 2007	term expired	John R. McKernan Jr.	Angus King
98	Kermit Lipez	1941–	South Portland	May 12, 1994	June 30, 1998	elevation to the 1st Cir.	John R. McKernan Jr.	
99	Leigh Saufley	1954–	Portland	October 20, 1997	December 6, 2001	elevation to Chief Justice	Angus King	
100	Donald G. Alexander	1942–	Winthrop	September 2, 1998	January 31, 2020	retirement	Angus King	John Baldacci; Paul LePage
101	Susan W. Calkins	1942–	Portland	September 2, 1998	October 1, 2007	resignation	Angus King	John Baldacci
102	Jon D. Levy	1954–	Portland	March 7, 2002	May 5, 2014	elevation to the D. Me.	Angus King	John Baldacci
103	Warren Silver	1948–	Bangor	July 29, 2005	December 31, 2014	resignation	John Baldacci	Paul LePage
104	Andrew Mead	1952–	Bangor	March 22, 2007	present		John Baldacci	Paul LePage; Janet Mills
105	Ellen Gorman	1955–	Falmouth	October 1, 2007	March 18, 2022	retirement	John Baldacci	Paul LePage
106	Joseph Jabar	1946–	Waterville	September 1, 2009	January 31, 2024	resignation	John Baldacci	Paul LePage
107	Jeffrey Hjelm	1955–	Camden	August 1, 2014	December 2019	retirement	Paul LePage	
108	Thomas E. Humphrey	1945–	Sanford	June 9, 2015	May 31, 2022	retirement	Paul LePage	
109	Andrew M. Horton	1949–	Falmouth	February 4, 2020	unknown	retirement	Janet Mills	
110	Catherine Connors	1959–	Kennebunk	February 4, 2020	present		Janet Mills	
111	Rick E. Lawrence	1955–	Portland	May 4, 2022	present		Janet Mills	
112	Wayne R. Douglas	1951/52–	Old Orchard Beach	March 10, 2023	present		Janet Mills	
112	Julia M. Lipez	1980–	Cape Elizabeth	March 28, 2025	present		Janet Mills	
113	Chris Taub	1968/69–		April 6, 2026	present		Janet Mills	

== Active retired justices ==
Retired justices who have been reappointed to enable them to continue to take part in Supreme Judicial Court proceedings.

Judge	Lifespan	Residence	Began service	Ended service	Reason for termination	Appointed by	Re-appointed by
George E. Bird	1847–1926	Portland	October 23, 1923	January 19, 1926	death	Percival P. Baxter	
Albert Spear	1852–1929	Gardiner	July 24, 1923	January 31, 1929	death	Percival P. Baxter	
John A. Morrill	1855–1945	Auburn	June 4, 1926	June 4, 1933	term expired	Owen Brewster	
Warren C. Philbrook	1857–1933	Waterville	November 29, 1928	May 31, 1933	death	Owen Brewster	
Arthur Chapman	1873–1959	Portland	July 27, 1945	August 8, 1952	term expired	Horace Hildreth	
Harry Manser	1874–1955	Auburn	March 30, 1946	February 20, 1955	death	Horace Hildreth	Burton M. Cross
Edward P. Murray	1876–1966	Bangor	November 1948	November 1962	term expired	Horace Hildreth	Burton M. Cross
Guy H. Sturgis	1877–1951	Portland	March 8, 1949	January 18, 1951	death	Frederick G. Payne	
Sidney St. Felix Thaxter	1883–1958	Portland	March 3, 1954	June 30, 1958	death	Burton M. Cross	
Percy T. Clarke	1885–1957	Ellsworth	June 19, 1956	August 1957	retirement	Edmund Muskie	
Armand A. Dufresne Jr.	1909–1994	Lewiston	September 16, 1977	March 16, 1985	retirement	James B. Longley	Joseph E. Brennan
Thomas E. Delahanty	1914–1985	Lewiston	August 31, 1979	February 4, 1985	death	Joseph E. Brennan	
James Archibald	1912–2006	Houlton	October 24, 1981	May 28, 2006	death	Joseph E. Brennan	John R. McKernan Jr. Angus King (x2)
Sidney W. Wernick	1913–1995	Portland	July 11, 1984	September 22, 1995	death	Joseph E. Brennan	John R. McKernan Jr.
Elmer H. Violette	1921–2000	Van Buren	August 1, 1986	February 1, 1994	retirement	Joseph E. Brennan	John R. McKernan Jr.
Samuel Collins	1923–2012	Rockland	May 12, 1994	March 22, 2012	death	John R. McKernan Jr.	Angus King; John Baldacci
David G. Roberts	1928–1999	Bangor	September 2, 1998	January 26, 1999	death	Angus King	
Robert W. Clifford	1937–	Lewiston	September 1, 2009	October 2024	term expired	John Baldacci	Paul LePage
Jeffrey Hjelm	1956–	Camden	January 6, 2020	present		Janet Mills	
Thomas E. Humphrey	1945–	Sanford	June 2022	present		Janet Mills	
Andrew M. Horton	1949–	Falmouth	unknown (confirmed November 14, 2025	present		Janet Mills	

== See also ==
- Maine Supreme Judicial Court
