= Charles P. Barnes =

American judge and politician from Maine

The Honorable Charles P. Barnes

17th Chief Justice of the Maine Supreme Judicial Court
- In office November 21, 1939 – July 31, 1940
- Nominated by: Lewis Barrows
- Preceded by: Charles J. Dunn
- Succeeded by: Guy H. Sturgis

Associate Justice of the Maine Supreme Judicial Court
- In office April 17, 1924 – November 21, 1939
- Nominated by: Percival Baxter
- Preceded by: George M. Hanson
- Succeeded by: George H. Worster

67th Speaker of the Maine House of Representatives
- In office 1921-1922
- Preceded by: Frank G. Farrington
- Succeeded by: Frank H. Holley

Member of the Maine House of Representatives from the 7th District
- In office 1917–1922
- Preceded by: Leonard A. Pierce
- Succeeded by: Bernard Archibald

Personal details
- Born: October 12, 1869 Houlton, Maine, U.S.
- Died: December 14, 1951 (aged 82) Houlton, Maine, U.S.
- Party: Republican
- Children: 6, including George

Charles Putnam Barnes (October 12, 1869 – December 14, 1951) was a judge and politician from Maine who served as speaker of the Maine House of Representatives from 1921 to 1922, and as justice of the Maine Supreme Judicial Court from April 17, 1924, to July 31, 1940. From 1939 to 1940, Barnes was Chief Justice of the court.

== Early life and education ==
Charles Putnam Barnes was born in Houlton, Maine, on October 12, 1869, to Francis, a Deacon at a local Baptist Church, and Isa (née Putnam) Barnes.

Barnes spent most of his life in Houlton, attending the local private Ricker Classical Institute for his secondary education. Following his graduation from the Ricker Classical Institute in 1888, Barnes attended Colby College, a private liberal arts school in Waterville, Maine. He received a B.A. and M.A. from the school in 1892 and 1893, respectively. Barnes later earned an honorary master's degree from the University of Michigan in 1923 and a Doctorate in Law from Colby in 1927.

== Career ==
After graduating from Colby College, Barnes served as principal of schools in Norway and Lisbon Falls, Maine, and Attleboro, Massachusetts, before becoming the superintendent of the Norway school district. Barnes ended his 8-year career in education in 1900, and instead began studying law under Maine Supreme Judicial Court justice Joseph W. Symonds.

Shortly after moving with his family once again to Norway, Barnes was admitted to the Oxford County Bar Association in 1900 and began practicing law. He was the Oxford County attorney for five years from 1904 to 1909, and then an Assistant Attorney General of Maine for two years from 1909 to 1911. As Assistant Attorney General, and later as State Representative, Barnes had a focus on cases of medicine, public health, and education.

Following his stint as Assistant Attorney General, Barnes decided to give up the position in favor of returning to Houlton with his family to pursue a private law career. During this time, Barnes became a trustee of his alma maters, Colby College and the Ricker Classical Institute, as well as the Houlton Public Library and the now-defunct Houlton Savings Bank. During World War I, Barnes served as Food Administrator in Aroostook County.

In 1917, Barnes was elected as a Republican to represent Maine's 7th District in Maine's lower house. As a member of the Maine House of Representatives, Barnes served on the following committees:

- Judiciary Committee
- Joint-Select Committee on Elections
- Joint-Select Committee on Gubernatorial Vote
- Joint-Select Committee on Reference of Bills
- Joint-Select Committee on Resolutions Relative to the Death of Ex-President Roosevelt

Following Barnes' success as a Representative in Maine's lower house, Governor Percival Baxter appointed him to Maine's Supreme Judicial Court as Associate Justice on April 17, 1924, to fill the seat left by George M. Hanson's death. Barnes served on the court for over 15 years before Governor Lewis Barrows promoted him to Chief Justice following the death of Chief Justice Charles J. Dunn on November 10, 1939.

== Personal life and death ==
Prior to his appointment to the Maine Supreme Judicial Court by Governor Baxter, Barnes had befriended Baxter. Together they traveled to the area around Mount Katahdin in hopes of promoting a future state park.

Starting in 1913, Barnes served as the president of the Aroostook Colby Club. He also served as the Vice President of the Maine Society of the National Society of the Sons of the American Revolution starting in 1931. He was a brother of the Delta Kappa Epsilon fraternity and the Masons. Barnes served in politics as a member of the Republican Party.

Barnes and his wife, Annie, had 5 children together; four sons and one daughter. One of their sons, George B. Barnes, was Speaker of the Maine House of Representatives from 1945 to 1946, 23 years after Charles Barnes left office. George Barnes later served in the Maine Senate from 1947 to 1953.

Charles P. Barnes died at the age of 82 on December 14, 1951, in Houlton, roughly two months after his wife died. He is buried with his wife, Annie, and his parents Francis and Isa in Houlton, Maine. Barnes was a Baptist.

Maine House of Representatives
Preceded by Leonard A. Pierce	Member of the Maine House of Representatives from the 7th District; 1917-1922	Succeeded by Bernard Archibald
Preceded by Frank G. Farrington	Speaker of the Maine House of Representatives; 1921-1922	Succeeded by Frank H. Holley
Legal offices
Preceded by George M. Hanson	Associate Justice of the Maine Supreme Judicial Court; 1924-1939	Succeeded by George H. Worster
Preceded by Charles J. Dunn	Chief Justice of the Maine Supreme Judicial Court; 1939–1940	Succeeded by Guy H. Sturgis
