= John B. Madigan =

American judge (1863–1918)

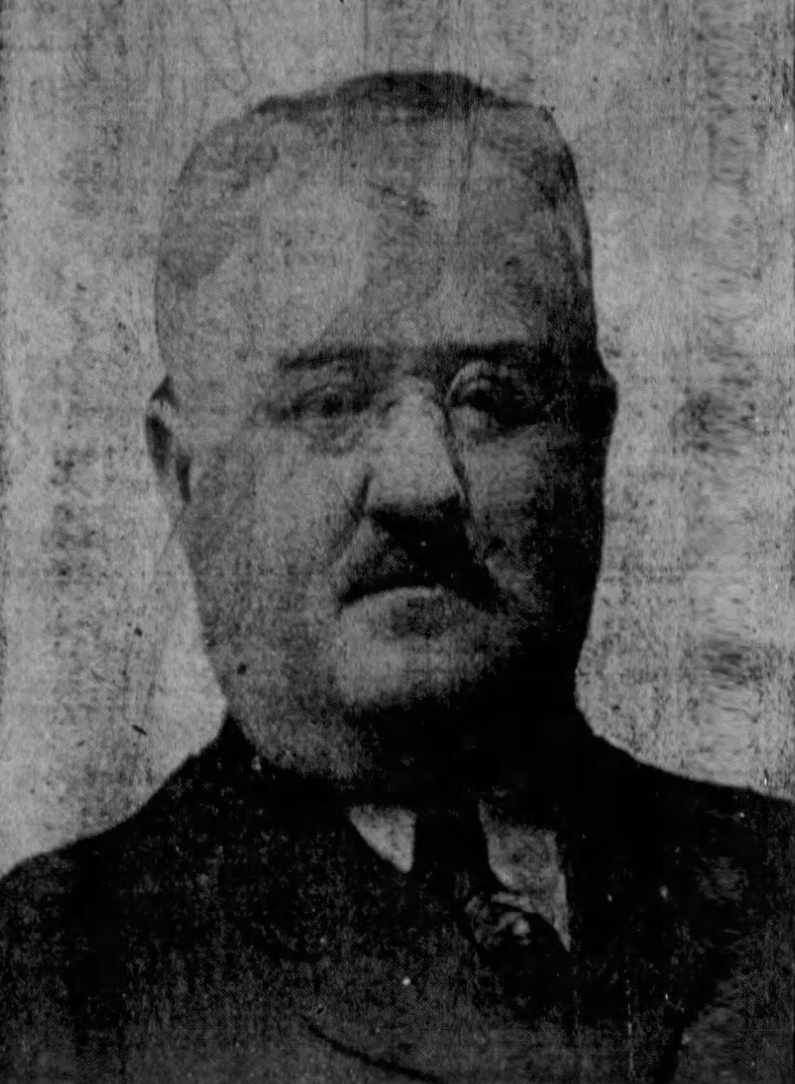
Justice John B. Madigan

John Bernard Madigan (January 4, 1863 – January 19, 1918), of Houlton, Maine, was a Maine attorney, politician, and judge who served as a justice of the Maine Supreme Judicial Court from March 1, 1916 to January 19, 1918.

== Early life, education, and career ==
Born in Houlton, Maine, to James C. and Mary Anna (Whittier) Madigan, he attended the village schools and prepared for college at the Ricker Classical Institute. Madigan received an A.B. from Georgetown University in 1883 and was admitted to the Bar of Aroostook county in 1885, thereafter entering the practice of law. He received an LL.B. from the Boston University School of Law in 1886. He received an A.M. from Georgetown in 1889.

For many years he was associated with his brother, Albert Madigan, under the firm title of Madigan and Madigan. After Albert's death, Leonard A, Pierce, a nephew, was admitted to the firm, which became Madigan and Pierce.

== Political and judicial activities ==
Madigan was elected to the Maine House of Representatives in 1889, at the age of 26 years, becoming the first Democrat to be elected to the seat representing the towns of Houlton and Hodgdon. He was a member of the committee on legal affairs in that session. He twice ran unsuccessfully for a seat in the state senate, and was for four years a member of the Democratic state committee, always being prominent at the party conventions.

He was appointed a member of the state board of legal examiners by Justice John A. Peters when that board was created in 1899, and served about 12 years. He was a member of the school board of Houlton for about 15 years, serving as chairman for much of that time. For over 20 years he was on the advisory board of Ricker Classical Institute, also a trustee of the Cary Library, of the Houlton Agricultural Society, director of the First National Bank, and interested in many other local institute.

In 1912, Madigan was a candidate for Congress in the 1912 Democratic primaries, where he was defeated by a small margin, by Charles W. Mullen, the mayor of Bangor. He continued to engage in the practice of law until his appointment to the state supreme court in 1916.

On January 16, 1916, Madigan was appointed by Governor Oakley C. Curtis, to succeed Albert Spear as an associate justice on the state supreme court, and took office March 1, 1916, serving thereafter until his death, which contributed to a substantial transformation of the membership of the court in that period.

== Personal life and death ==
He married Lucia Rose, with whom he had a son, James, and a daughter, Alice.

Madigan was largely instrumental in the equipping of the Madigan Memorial Hospital, a gift from his late brother to the Catholic diocese of Maine, and contributed liberally to its support.

He was taken violently ill after returning home from term of court in Somerset county in his usual good health. The attack appeared to be acute indigestion but further diagnosis and consultation determined it was a more serious condition, for which operations performed Thursday and again Friday failed to relieve.

Madigan died in the Madigan Memorial Hospital, and funeral services were designated be held in St. Mary's church in Houlton.

Political offices
Preceded by Albert Spear	Justice of the Maine Supreme Judicial Court; 1916–1918	Succeeded by Charles J. Dunn
