= Harry Manser =

American judge (1874–1955)

The Honorable Harry Manser

Justice of the Maine Supreme Judicial Court
- In office July 18, 1935 – March 20, 1946
- Appointed by: Louis J. Brann
- Preceded by: Charles J. Dunn
- Succeeded by: Raymond Fellows

Personal details
- Born: April 20, 1874 Hever, Kent, England
- Died: February 20, 1955 (aged 80) Auburn, Maine, U.S.
- Spouse: Gladys M. Stover
- Children: 3
- Education: Lewiston High School
- Profession: Judge, Lawyer

Harry Manser (April 20, 1874 – February 20, 1955), of Auburn, Maine, was a justice of the Maine Supreme Judicial Court from July 18, 1935, until his retirement on March 20, 1946, remaining in active senior service until his death in 1955.

== Early life, education, and career ==
Born Hever, Kent, England to William and Eliza (Canham) Manser, Manser received his early education in London until the age of thirteen, when his mother brought him and his two sisters to the United States. He thereafter attended the public schools in Maine, graduating from Lewiston High School in 1893.

Due to his "experience in the art of shorthand", Manser was hired by the Lewiston firm of Frye, Cotton & White, where he read law. Manser was naturalized as a U.S. citizen on his 21st birthday, and gained admission to the bar in Androscoggin County, Maine, the following year, in September 1896. He then served as Lewiston City Solicitor beginning in 1897, though sources vary as to when that service ended. He "opened his own legal practice in Lewiston" in 1903, also serving as "a part-time judge in Auburn Municipal Court from 1903 to 1911 and from 1918 to 1926", and as Auburn City Solicitor from 1911 to 1912.

== Judicial service ==
On April 1, 1928, Governor Ralph Owen Brewster appointed Manser to the Maine Superior Court, and on July 18, 1935, Democratic Governor Louis J. Brann appointed the Republican Manser as an Associate Justice of the Maine Supreme Judicial Court.

In 1937 Manser was at "the center of a wide controversy for jailing seven labor leaders during a shoe strike". Manser granted a motion seeking a temporary injunction against the strike, sentencing the union leaders to six months in jail for contempt when the strike continued. Organized labor advocates criticized the sentences as "deliberate violations of the rights of free speech and assembly", while Manser countered that "the penalty must be such as to promulgate and endeavor to teach respect for the law". The union leaders were released after two months, and brought their cases went to the full court, which overruled Manser.

== Personal life and death ==
Manser married Gladys M. Stover, with whom he had three daughters. Gladys died shortly before Manser.

Manser died at his home in Auburn, Maine, at the age of 80, following a lengthy illness.

Political offices
Preceded by Charles J. Dunn	Justice of the Maine Supreme Judicial Court; 1935–1946	Succeeded by Raymond Fellows
