= George H. Worster =

American judge (1871–1965)

George Henry Worster (September 5, 1871 – February 26, 1965) was a justice of the Maine Supreme Judicial Court from December 21, 1939 to July 31, 1942.

== Early life, education, and career ==
Born in Bangor, Maine, to George W. and Margaret Nason Worster, Worster graduated from Kenduskeag Free High School and attended Hamlin Academy for a year. In 1893, Worster "worked as a messenger at the Penobscot County Courthouse and read law at the office of Charles A. Bailey and former Governor Davis".

Worster later attended the University of Maine, and in what is described as "an unusual set of circumstances", he "began teaching at the University of Maine School of Law in 1903", from which he received an LL.B. in 1905 and an LL.M. in 1906. He was admitted to the bar in 1905 and again taught at the University of Maine Law School for several years. He also engaged in the private practice of law in Bangor.

== Judicial service ==
On November 10, 1924, Governor Percival P. Baxter nominated Worster to a seat on the Superior Court of Penobscot County vacated by the death of Judge Bertram L. Smith.

In 1939, Governor Lewis O. Barrows elevated Worster to a seat as an associate justice of the Maine Supreme Judicial Court, vacated by the elevation to chief justice of Justice Charles P. Barnes, following the death of the previous chief justice, Charles J. Dunn. Worster remained on the high court for less than three years, until his resignation in 1942.

== Personal life and death ==
He married Carrie E. Rich, with whom he had one son. His wife died in 1958. Worster remained in Bangor, where he died in 1965, at the age of 93.

Political offices
Preceded by Charles P. Barnes	Justice of the Maine Supreme Judicial Court; 1939–1942	Succeeded by Arthur Chapman
