= William B. Nulty =

American judge

William Bridgham Nulty (January 28, 1888 – September 11, 1953) was an American jurist who served as an associate justice of the Supreme Judicial Court of Maine. Appointed a Maine Supreme Court justice by Maine Governor Frederick G. Payne (R) in 1949, McNulty died in office on September 11, 1953.

A graduate of Bowdoin College, McNulty subsequently attended Columbia Law School. Prior to being appointed to the Maine Supreme Court, Nulty served for 12 years as Assistant United States Attorney for the District of Maine and, then, later, as a Maine Superior Court Judge.

Political offices
| Preceded by Harold H. Murchie | Justice of the Maine Supreme Judicial Court; 1949–1953 | Succeeded by Donald W. Webber |
