= William H. Fogler =

American judge (1837–1902)

William Henry Fogler (August 10, 1837 – February 18, 1902), of Rockland, Maine, was a justice of the Maine Supreme Judicial Court from March 25, 1898, to February 18, 1902.

Born in Lincolnville, Maine, Folger attended Waterville College (later called Colby College) in 1859 and 1860, and read law to gain admission to the Waldo Bar in 1862. He was a Colonel in the 19th Maine Volunteers during the American Civil War. He moved to Rockland in 1890, and was appointed as an associate justice on March 25, 1898, serving in that capacity until his death.

Political offices
Preceded by Enoch Foster	Justice of the Maine Supreme Judicial Court; 1898–1902	Succeeded by Albert Spear
