= Arthur Chapman (judge) =

American state court judge (1873–1959)

United States Attorney for the District of Maine
- In office 1904–1915

Justice of the Maine Supreme Judicial Court
- In office November 4, 1942 – July 27, 1945
- Appointed by: Sumner Sewall

Personal details
- Born: Arthur Chapman; August 6, 1873 Portland, Maine
- Died: January 5, 1959 (aged 84)
- Education: Bowdoin College

Arthur Chapman (August 6, 1873 – January 5, 1959), was a justice of the Maine Supreme Judicial Court from November 4, 1942 until his resignation on July 27, 1945.

Chapman was born on August 6, 1873 in Portland, Maine. He attended Deering High School, and graduated from Bowdoin College in 1894. Prior to his legal career, Chapman was a teacher in Michigan and Connecticut, and was the first football coach of Portland High School.

Chapman was the United States Attorney for the District of Maine from 1904 to 1915, when he was appointed a United States Commissioner. On March 12, 1925, Governor Ralph Owen Brewster appointed Chapman to the Maine Superior Court, where he served until November 4, 1942, when Governor Sumner Sewall elevated Chapman to the state supreme court.

Chapman died at a Portland hospital at the age of 85, about four weeks after falling and fracturing his skull in his home.

Political offices
Preceded by George H. Worster	Justice of the Maine Supreme Judicial Court; 1942–1945	Succeeded by Nathaniel Tompkins
