= Jonathan G. Dickerson =

American judge (1811–1878)

Jonathan Garland Dickerson (November 5, 1811 – September 1, 1878), of Belfast, Maine, was a justice of the Maine Supreme Judicial Court from October 24, 1862, to September 1, 1878.

Born in Manchester, New Hampshire, Dickerson received a B.A. from Waterville College (now Colby College) in 1836, and a M.A. from the same institution in 1839, and taught in Bath, Maine, while reading law to gain admission to the bar, also in 1839. A resident of West Prospect now Searsport, Dickerson served in the Maine House of Representatives in 1842, and later as Waldo County Attorney. On October 24, 1862, Governor Israel Washburn Jr. appointed Dickerson to a seat as an associate justice of the state supreme court, where he served thereafter until his death.

Political offices
Preceded by John Appleton	Justice of the Maine Supreme Judicial Court; 1862–1878	Succeeded by Joseph W. Symonds
