= Edward F. Merrill =

American judge (1883–1962)

Edward Folsom Merrill (April 11, 1883 – January 31, 1962) was a justice of the Maine Supreme Judicial Court from June 2, 1948, to April 7, 1954, serving as chief justice from March 18, 1953, to April 7, 1954.

Born in Skowhegan, Maine, Merrill was educated at the local schools. He received a Bachelor of Arts from Bowdoin College in 1903 and a Juris Doctor from Harvard Law School in 1906. From 1933 until 1935, Merrill was President of the Maine State Bar Association.

On February 1, 1945, Governor Horace Hildreth appointed Merrill was to a seat on the Maine Superior Court. On June 2, 1948, Governor Hildreth appointed Merrill to a seat on the Maine Supreme Judicial Court vacated by Edward P. Murray. On March 18, 1953, Governor Burton M. Cross elevated Merrill to chief justice. Merrill retired from the Court on April 7, 1954, and thereafter "served as a legislative consultant for many years for Central Maine Power Company".

Merrill died in his home, in Skowhegan.

Political offices
Preceded by Edward P. Murray	Justice of the Maine Supreme Judicial Court; 1948–1953	Succeeded by Frank A. Tirrell
Preceded by Harold H. Murchie	Chief Justice of the Maine Supreme Judicial Court; 1953–1954	Succeeded by Raymond Fellows
