= Harold C. Marden =

American judge (1900–1994)

Harold Chesterfield Marden (July 28, 1900 – September 30, 1994) was a Maine lawyer and judge who served as a justice of the Maine Supreme Judicial Court from December 19, 1962 to November 15, 1970.

== Early life, education, and military service ==
Born in East Vassalboro, Maine, Marden graduated from Oak Grove Seminary in 1917, and served in the United States Army in World War I. He received his undergraduate degree from Colby College in 1921, and his J.D. from Harvard Law School in 1924.

His military service continued during this time, and in 1925, he was named a 2nd Lieutenant in Company G, 103rd Infantry Regiment stationed at Waterville, Maine.

Marden also served as city solicitor for Waterville, and as county attorney for Kennebec County, Maine, and as a member of the Maine Senate.

He returned to active military service in World War II, completing his service in 1946 at the rank of colonel.

== Judicial service ==
On March 3, 1953, Governor Burton M. Cross appointed Martin to a seven year term on the Maine Superior Court, to which Marden was re-appointed by Governor John H. Reed in 1960.

On November 14, 1962, Governor Reed nominated Marden to a seat on the state Supreme Court vacated by the retirement of Justice F. Harold Dubord. The appointment was confirmed by the Executive Council one week later, and Marden was sworn in as a justice on December 19, 1962.

Marden announced his retirement from the court on November 11, 1970, having held judicial offices in the state for 18 years.

== Personal life and death ==
In 1923, Marden married Dorothy Evelyn Harlow, with whom he had a daughter and three sons. One of his sons, Robert A. Marden, also served as Kennebec County Attorney and a member of the Maine Senate.

Marden remained with Dorothy until her death in 1987. He died in Boothbay Harbor, Maine, at the age of 94.

Political offices
Preceded by F. Harold Dubord	Justice of the Maine Supreme Judicial Court; 1962–1970	Succeeded by James Archibald
