= Senator Holley =

Senator Holley may refer to:

- Frank H. Holley (1880–1949), Maine State Senate
- Jimmy Holley (1944–2024), Alabama State Senate
