= Justice Danforth =

Justice Danforth may refer to:

- Charles Danforth (judge) (1815–1890), associate justice of the Maine Supreme Judicial Court
- George F. Danforth (1819–1899), judge of the New York Court of Appeals
