= Frederick A. Powers =

American judge (1855–1923)

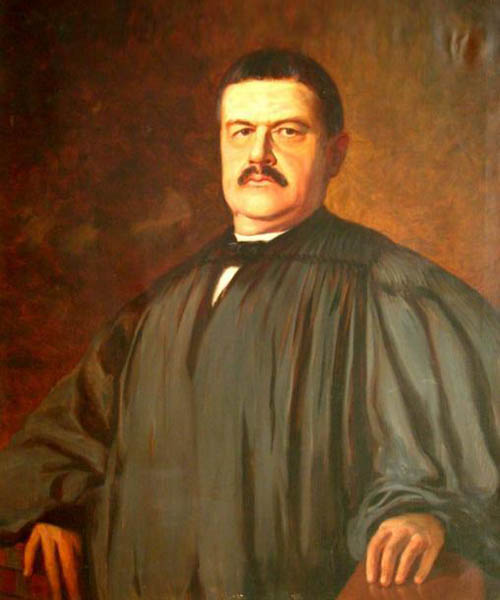
- Portrait of Powers, c. 1900

Maine Attorney General
- In office 1893–1897
- Preceded by: Charles E. Littlefield
- Succeeded by: William T. Haines

Associate Justice of the Maine Supreme Judicial Court
- In office January 2, 1900 – March 21, 1907
- Preceded by: Andrew P. Wiswell
- Succeeded by: Leslie C. Cornish

Member of the Maine House of Representatives
- In office 1885–1888

Member of the Maine Senate
- In office 1891–1892

Personal details
- Born: Frederick Alton Powers; June 19, 1855 Pittsfield, Maine, US
- Died: February 13, 1923 (aged 67) St. Petersburg, Florida, US
- Relations: Llewellyn Powers (brother)
- Children: 2, including Paul
- Occupation: Politician, lawyer, judge

Frederick Alton Powers (June 19, 1855 – February 13, 1923) was an American politician, lawyer, and judge. He was the Maine Attorney General from 1893 to 1897 and a Justice of the Maine Supreme Judicial Court from 1900 to 1907.

== Biography ==
Powers was born on June 19, 1855, in Pittsfield, Maine, to Arba Powers and Naomi (née Mathews) Powers. He was the youngest of eight brothers, five of whom were lawyers and politicians, including his brother Llewellyn. He graduated from Maine Central Institute and Bowdoin College, in 1871 and 1875, respectively. He read law under his brother Llewellyn and was admitted to the bar in September 1876.

Powers was a member of the Republican Party, and was a delegate to the 1888 Republican National Convention. For six years, he was a member of the Maine Republican Committee. He served in the Maine House of Representatives from 1885 to 1888, serving as Chairman of the Committee on the Judiciary during his second term. From 1891 to 1892, he was a member of the Maine Senate. Llewellyn appointed him an Associate Justice of the Maine Supreme Judicial Court on January 2, 1900. He resigned on March 21, 1907, after which he was succeeded by Leslie C. Cornish. In 1910, he unsuccessfully ran for the United States Senate.

On January 6, 1879, Powers married May Hussey. Hussey died in 1901, after which he married Virginia H. Hewes. He had two children, including politician Paul H. Powers. He lived in Houlton and owned approximately 60,000 acres of land and was one of the largest landowners of Maine woodlands.

Powers died on February 13, 1923, aged 67, at his winter home in St. Petersburg, Florida. He is buried at Evergreen Cemetery, in Houlton, with a cenotaph of him located at Tilton Corner Cemetery, in Pittsfield. In 1932, a court case regarding his estate was settled. A special collection with Powers' papers is held by the Maine State Archives.

Legal offices
Preceded by Charles E. Littlefield	Maine Attorney General; 1889–1892	Succeeded by William T. Haines
