= Justice Emery =

Justice Emery may refer to:

- Lucilius A. Emery (1840–1920), associate justice of the Maine Supreme Judicial Court
- Nicholas Emery (1776–1861), associate justice of the Maine Supreme Judicial Court
