= John A. Morrill =

American judge

Personal details
- Born: June 3, 1855 Auburn, Maine, U.S.
- Died: August 24, 1945 (aged 90) Auburn, Maine, U.S.
- Education: Bowdoin College

John Adams Morrill (June 3, 1855 – August 24, 1945), of Auburn, Maine, USA, was a justice of the Maine Supreme Judicial Court from March 5, 1918, to June 4, 1926.

Born in Auburn, Morrill graduated from Bowdoin College in 1876 and read law to be admitted to the bar in 1880. He served on the commission to revise statutes in 1903 and 1916, and was a probate judge from 1913 until he was appointed as an associate justice on February 25, 1918, to a seat vacated by the death of George F. Haley. He resigned from the Court on May 31, 1926, entering active retired justice status on June 4, 1926. Following his retirement, he was an overseer of his alma mater, Bowdoin College.

Morrill died in Auburn at the age of 90.

Political offices
Preceded by George F. Haley	Justice of the Maine Supreme Judicial Court; 1918–1926	Succeeded by William Robinson Pattangall
