= John F. Appleton =

American lawyer & colonel (1838–1870)

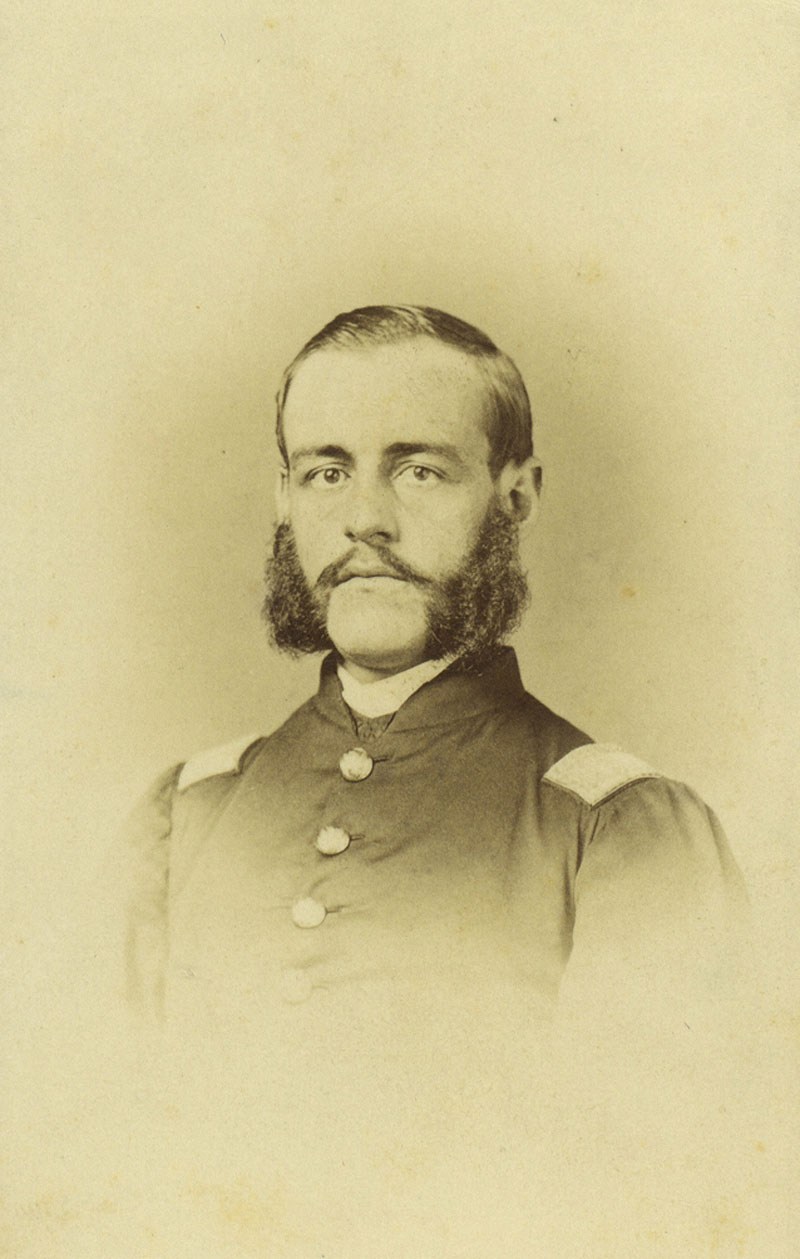
- John Francis Appleton
- Born: August 29, 1838; Bangor, Maine
- Died: August 31, 1870 (aged 32)
- Parent(s): John Appleton; Sarah Newcomb Appleton
- Relatives: Appleton family

John Francis Appleton (August 29, 1838 – August 31, 1870) was a lawyer and Union colonel in the American Civil War from the state of Maine who was awarded the honorary grade of brevet brigadier general, United States Volunteers.

== Early life ==
Born in Bangor, Maine, the oldest son of Maine Supreme Judicial Court Chief Justice John Appleton, he was a graduate of Bangor High School and Bowdoin College.

== American Civil War service ==
When the Civil War began the year after his college graduation, Appleton raised and commanded a company for the 12th Maine Volunteer Infantry Regiment, which saw action in Louisiana and Virginia. At the Battle of Port Hudson, according to a published account by a fellow officer, "Capt. Appleton alone, among ten thousand men who fought that day, mounted the Rebel parapet and stood there facing the whole Rebel Army, a mark for a thousand rifles . . . A Confederate officer told me, after the surrender, that as he saw that young man standing there so calm and brave, he could not bear to see him die, and he told his men not to fire upon him." For this and similar acts Appleton was promoted to colonel and eventually, on May 18, 1866, brevetted as a brigadier general of volunteers (back dated to March 13, 1865).

Appleton subsequently accepted command of a free black regiment (the 81st Regiment Infantry U.S. Colored Troops), as did another Union general from Bangor serving in Louisiana, Cyrus Hamlin, the son of Vice President Hannibal Hamlin, who had strongly urged the arming of freed slaves.

== Postbellum ==
On May 18, 1866, the U.S. Senate confirmed the award to Colonel Appleton of the honorary grade of brevet brigadier general, U.S. Volunteers, to rank from March 13, 1865 for faithful and meritorious services.

During Southern Reconstruction, Appleton was offered the position of U.S. District Judge for the Eastern District of Texas, but declined due to ill-health. He practiced law in Bangor and died there in 1870. He is buried in the city's Mount Hope Cemetery.
