= Joseph W. Symonds =

American judge (1840–1918)

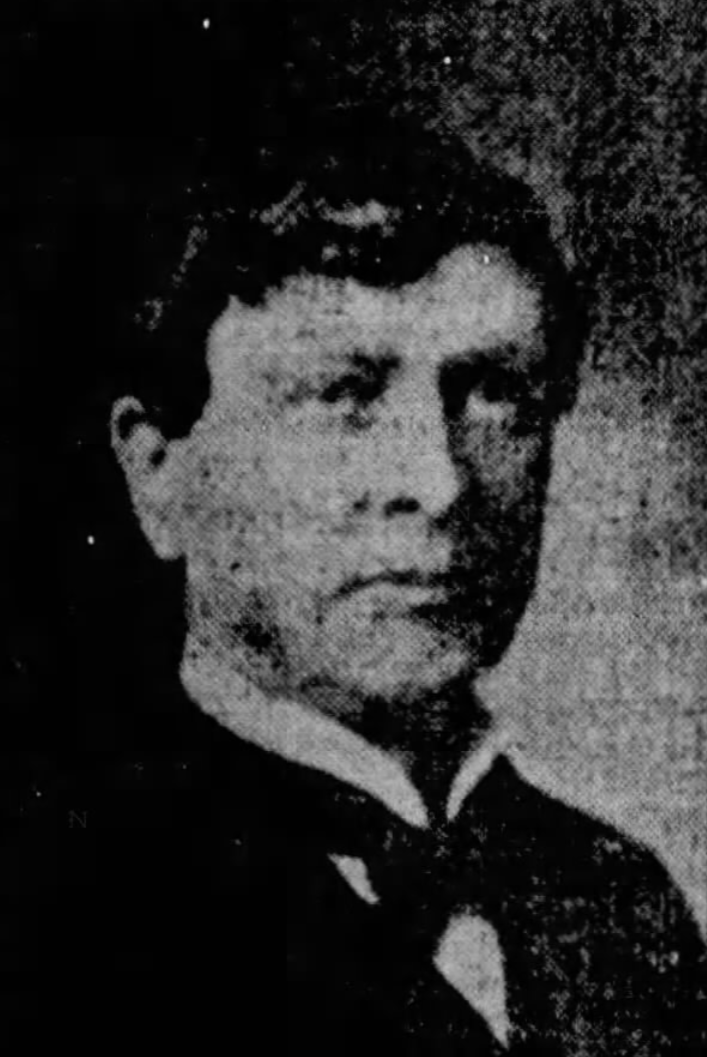
Maine Supreme Judicial Court Justice Joseph W. Symonds

Joseph White Symonds (September 2, 1840 – September 28, 1918), of Portland, Maine, was a justice of the Maine Supreme Judicial Court from October 16, 1878, to March 31, 1884.

== Early life ==
Born in Raymond, Maine, Symonods graduated from Bowdoin College in 1860, and read law to gain admission to the bar in 1863.

== Career ==
He was appointed as a Judge of the Superior Court of Cumberland County in 1872, and as an associate justice of the Maine Supreme Judicial Court on October 16, 1878, serving until his resignation on March 31, 1884. Scott Wilson and Charles P. Barnes, who would both go on to become justices of the same court, studied law under the tutelage of Symonds. Following his service on the court, Symonds served for periods as overseer of Bowdoin College, and as director of the Maine Central Railroad Company.

== Personal life ==
In 1884, Symonds married Mary Campbell Stuart of Huntington, New York. Symonds died while vacationing in Bethlehem, New Hampshire, at the age of 78.

Political offices
Preceded by Jonathan G. Dickerson	Justice of the Maine Supreme Judicial Court; 1878–1884	Succeeded by Thomas H. Haskell
