= Arno W. King =

American judge (1855–1918)

Arno Warren King (August 2, 1855 – July 21, 1918), of Ellsworth, Maine, was a justice of the Maine Supreme Judicial Court from June 28, 1907, to July 21, 1918.

Born in Lamoine, Maine, King graduated from Colby College in 1883, and from Boston University School of Law the same year. He was appointed an Associate Justice on June 28, 1907, and served until his death.

Political offices
Preceded by Charles F. Woodard	Justice of the Maine Supreme Judicial Court; 1907–1918	Succeeded by Scott Wilson
