= Charles Danforth (judge) =

American judge (1815–1890)

Justice Charles Danforth

Charles Danforth (August 1, 1815 – March 30, 1890), of Gardiner, Maine, was a justice of the Maine Supreme Judicial Court from January 5, 1864, to March 30, 1890.

== Early life, education, and career ==
Born in Norridgewock, Maine, the son of Israel Danforth, a farmer and saddler, and Sally Wait, he attended schools in Norridgewock and academies in Farmington and Bloomfield before studying law in the office of John S. Tenney. He was admitted to the Somerset County bar in 1838 and began practicing law in Gorham.

Danforth moved to Gardiner in 1841, where he formed a law partnership with Noah Woods. The partnership continued until Woods retired from legal practice in 1854. Danforth represented Gardiner in the Maine House of Representatives from 1850 to 1852 and again in 1857. He served on the Judiciary Committee and chaired the committee on the Insane Hospital. He was a member of the Executive Council of Governor Anson P. Morrill in 1855. He was subsequently elected Kennebec County attorney twice, serving until his appointment to the state supreme court.

== Judicial service ==
Danforth was appointed an associate justice of the Maine Supreme Judicial Court on January 5, 1864. He was reappointed in 1871, 1877, and 1884, and remained on the court until his death.

== Personal life and death ==
Danforth married Julia S. Dinsmore in 1845. He contracted pneumonia while attending court in Skowhegan, and died at his home in Gardiner, at the age of 74. He was buried in Norridgewock.

Political offices
Preceded by Richard D. Rice	Justice of the Maine Supreme Judicial Court; 1864–1890	Succeeded by William Penn Whitehouse
