= Albert R. Savage =

American politician and judge (1847–1917)

Albert Russell Savage (December 8, 1847 – June 14, 1917) was an American attorney and politician from Maine. Representing Auburn, Maine, he served in the Maine House of Representatives from 1891 to 1897. In 1893–94, Savage was elected Speaker of the House. In 1897, he resigned from office and was appointed Justice of the Maine Supreme Judicial Court, where he served from May 15, 1897, until his death on June 14, 1917.

Born in Ryegate, Vermont, Savage graduated from Dartmouth College in 1871, and read law to be admitted to the bar in April 1875. He was the Speaker of the Maine House of Representatives in 1893. Appointed Associate Justice on May 15, 1897, he became chief justice on April 9, 1913, and served in that capacity until his death, in Auburn.

Political offices
Preceded by Charles W. Walton	Justice of the Maine Supreme Judicial Court; 1897–1917	Succeeded by Leslie C. Cornish
