= William Robinson Pattangall =

American judge (1865–1942)

The Honorable William R. Pattangall
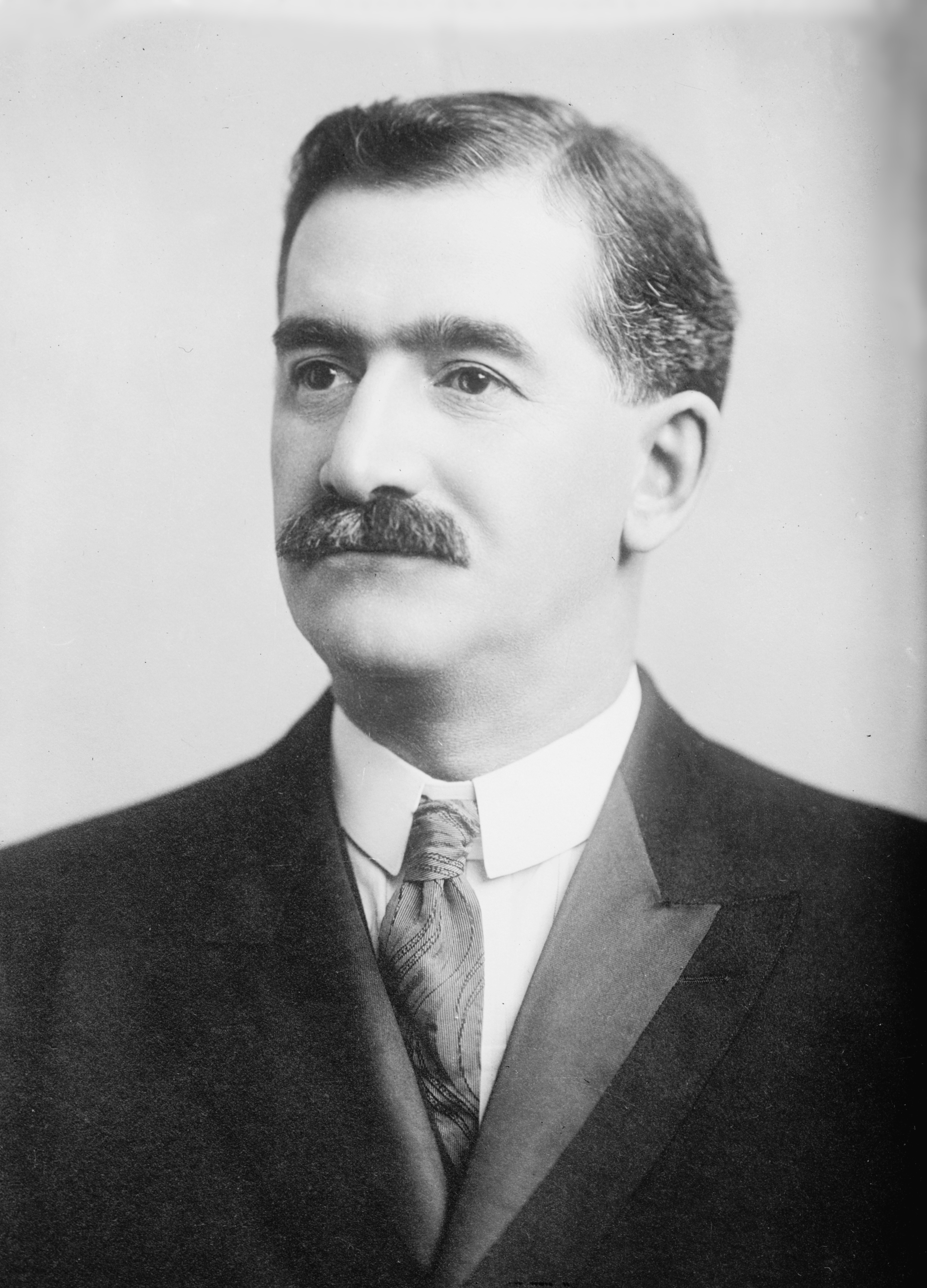

15th Chief Justice of the Maine Supreme Judicial Court
- In office February 7, 1930 – July 16, 1935
- Appointed by: William Tudor Gardiner
- Preceded by: Luere B. Deasy
- Succeeded by: Charles J. Dunn

Associate Justice of the Maine Supreme Judicial Court
- In office July 2, 1926 – February 7, 1930
- Appointed by: Owen Brewster
- Preceded by: Scott Wilson
- Succeeded by: Sidney St. Felix Thaxter

32nd and 34th Maine Attorney General
- In office 1915–1917
- Governor: Oakley C. Curtis
- Preceded by: Scott Wilson
- Succeeded by: Guy H. Sturgis
- In office 1911–1913
- Governor: Frederick W. Plaisted
- Preceded by: Cyrus R. Tupper
- Succeeded by: Scott Wilson

17th Mayor of Waterville, Maine
- In office 1911–1913
- Preceded by: Norman K. Fuller
- Succeeded by: Louis E. Hilliard

Personal details
- Born: June 29, 1865 Pembroke, Maine, U.S.
- Died: October 21, 1942 (aged 77) Augusta, Maine, U.S.
- Party: Democratic; Republican
- Spouses: Jean Mary Johnson (m. 1884; died 1887); Gertrude Helen McKenzie (m. 1892)
- Occupation: Lawyer; politician

William Robinson Pattangall (June 29, 1865 – October 21, 1942) was an American politician from Maine. He was particularly known for his support of public schools and opposition to the Ku Klux Klan. He was later the Chief Justice of the Maine Supreme Judicial Court retiring on July 16, 1935.

== Early political career ==
He was born on June 29, 1865, in Pembroke, Maine, a coastal town in Washington County. Pattangall married Jean M. Johnson in 1884 and later Gertrude Helen McKenzie (1874–1950) in 1892. Pattangall was elected as both a Republican and Democrat. He became Mayor of Waterville, a member of the Maine House of Representatives (1897–1898; 1901-1902; 1909–1912), and then Maine's Attorney General (1911–1913). Pattangall was a supporter of Woodrow Wilson and a proponent of civil rights.

As a state legislator, Pattangall fought for a provision from 1909 to 1911 doubling the amount of state tax money dedicated to Maine schools. Passed in 1911, the law was then brought before the Maine Supreme Judicial Court as unconstitutional. Pattangall, now Attorney General, argued in its favor and prevailed.

== Opposition to the Ku Klux Klan ==
Pattangall was the Democratic candidate for Governor of Maine in 1922 and 1924 but lost both times. The second race was against Republican Owen Brewster, who was supported by the Ku Klux Klan. Pattangall made Brewster's Klan support the centerpiece of the campaign. Although this was not a winning strategy, it helped set the stage for a split within the Maine Republican Party around the issue of Klan support, resulting in the election of anti-Klan (and anti-Brewster) Republican Senator Arthur R. Gould in 1926.

Pattangall also fought the Klan element in his own party. As a delegate to the Democratic National Convention of 1924, in New York, he proposed inserting an anti-Klan plank into the party platform, despite the presence of an estimated 300 Klansmen in the hall. The attempt caused the "hissing and booing of Klansmen along with fist fights, chair tossing, and destruction of convention decorations". Opposed by William Jennings Bryan and other party leaders, the plank was voted down, and with it the potential presidential candidacy of Catholic Al Smith. Smith's supporters would be more successful at the subsequent Democratic convention, however, by which time the Klan had seriously weakened as a political force.

Pattangall was a gifted and entertaining orator, well known for his caustic wit. This is exemplified in his volume "Meddybemps Letters" that included a "Hall of Fame" with bitterly satiric biographies of the leading Republicans of the time. Pattangall was never elected to national office, however, due to what he characterized as "Democratic treachery."

== Judgeship and Defection to the Republican Party ==
Pattangall was appointed Associate Justice of the Maine Supreme Judicial Court (by the Republican administration) in 1926, but only broke with his party over President Franklin Roosevelt's New Deal, to which he became bitterly opposed. He ultimately joined the Republican Party and soon after was appointed Chief Justice (1930–35). He died on October 21, 1942, in Augusta, Maine.

Party political offices
Preceded by Bertrand G. McIntire	Democratic nominee for Governor of Maine; 1922, 1924	Succeeded by Ernest L. McLean
Political offices
Preceded by Luere B. Deasy	Chief Justice of the Maine Supreme Judicial Court; February 7, 1930–July 16, 1935	Succeeded by Charles J. Dunn, Jr.
Preceded by Scott Wilson	Associate Justice of the Maine Supreme Judicial Court; July 2, 1926–February 7, 1930	Succeeded by Sidney St. Felix Thaxter
Preceded by Cyrus R. Tupper	Maine Attorney General; 1911–1912	Succeeded by Scott Wilson
Preceded by Scott Wilson	Maine Attorney General; 1915–1916	Succeeded by Guy H. Sturgis
Preceded by Norman K. Fuller	17th Mayor of Waterville, Maine; 1911–1913	Succeeded by Louis E. Hilliard
