= William Penn Whitehouse =

American judge (1842–1922)

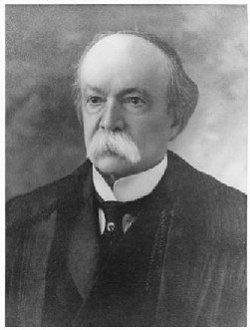

William Penn Whitehouse (April 9, 1842 – October 10, 1922) was a justice of the Maine Supreme Judicial Court from April 15, 1890, to April 8, 1913.

Born in Vassalboro, Maine, Whitehouse was elected to the Maine House of Representatives as a Republican in 1861. Serving just one single-year term, he graduated from Waterville College in 1863 and read law to gain admission to the bar in 1865. He was appointed as a justice of the Superior Court of Kennebec County, Maine, in 1878, and as an associate justice of the Supreme Judicial Court on April 15, 1890. He became chief justice on July 26, 1911, serving in that capacity until his resignation, on April 8, 1913.

Political offices
Preceded by Charles Danforth	Justice of the Maine Supreme Judicial Court; 1890–1913	Succeeded by Warren C. Philbrook
