= Nicholas Emery =

American judge (1776–1861)

Nicholas Emery (September 4, 1776 – August 24, 1861) was an American lawyer, politician, and judge who served as an associate justice of the Maine Supreme Judicial Court from October 22, 1834, to October 21, 1841.

== Early life and education ==
Emery was born in Exeter, New Hampshire, the third child of Noah Emery and Jane Hale. He attended Phillips Exeter Academy starting at the age of twelve in 1788 and in 1795 graduated from Dartmouth College. He read law with Edward St. Loe Livermore to gain admission to the bar.

== Career ==
Emery taught at Phillips Exeter for a year in 1797, with Daniel Webster being one of his students, before beginning his legal practice in Parsonsfield, Maine. In 1807, he moved to Portland. In 1816, Emery attended the Brunswick Convention that voted to separate the state of Maine from Massachusetts; three years later he would serve as a delegate to the 1819 Maine Constitutional Convention for Cumberland County, though he did not sign the constitution. He represented Portland in the newly created Maine House of Representatives for three years starting in 1820.

During a border dispute that would lead to the Aroostook War between the United States and the United Kingdom, Emery played a role in the arbitrations. King William I of the Netherlands had, as a neutral arbiter, drawn a border line between the two countries. In order to ease negotiations between the two countries, the government of Maine proposed to yield all territory north of the Saint John River and east of Saint Francis River to the federal government, in return for one million acres (4,000 km^{2}) of land in the Michigan Territory. Emery, along with Judge William Pitt Preble and Maine Legislator Reuel Williams, was sent as a delegate to negotiate the deal with the federal government, though the plan was ultimately rejected.

On October 22, 1834, Governor Robert P. Dunlap appointed him as an associate justice of the Maine Supreme Judicial Court to replace Nathan Weston, who was being elevated to the position of Chief Justice, and he served until October 21, 1841. He was succeeded by John S. Tenney.

== Personal life ==
Emery married the daughter of New Hampshire Governor John Taylor Gilman, Nancy Taylor, with whom he had six children. He died on August 24, 1861.

Political offices
Preceded by Nathan Weston	Justice of the Maine Supreme Judicial Court; 1834–1841	Succeeded by John S. Tenney
