= Donald W. Webber =

American judge (1906–1995)

Donald Wedgewood Webber (November 19, 1906 – November 15, 1995) of Auburn, Maine, was a justice of the Maine Supreme Judicial Court from October 8, 1953 to July 31, 1973.

He went to public schools in Auburn before graduating from Bowdoin College in 1927 and Harvard Law School in 1931. During World War II, he was an officer in the United States Naval Reserve.

On September 1, 1948, he was appointed a judge on the Maine Superior Court by Governor Horace Hildreth. On October 8, 1953, he was appointed an associate judge on the Maine Supreme Court by Governor Burton M. Cross. In 1973, Weber retired from the court and returned to private practice, continuing to hear Superior Court cases by referral until 1990.

== Personal life and death ==
In 1929, Webber married Lucy Nourse. He died in Auburn, at the age of 88.

Political offices
Preceded by William B. Nulty	Justice of the Maine Supreme Judicial Court; 1953–1973	Succeeded by Thomas E. Delahanty
