= Fogler =

Fogler is a surname that arose from Vogler, that being a type of "bird-catcher".

People having this surname include:

- Raymond H. Fogler (1892–1996), United States Assistant Secretary of the Navy
- Dan Fogler (born 1976), American actor, comedian and writer
- Eddie Fogler (born 1948), American retired college basketball player and coach
- Bartłomiej Fogler (born 1985), Polish footballer
- William H. Fogler (1837–1902), Justice of the Maine Supreme Judicial Court

== See also ==
- Raymond H. Fogler Library, academic library at the University of Maine
