= 1924 Maine gubernatorial election =

- September 8, 1924
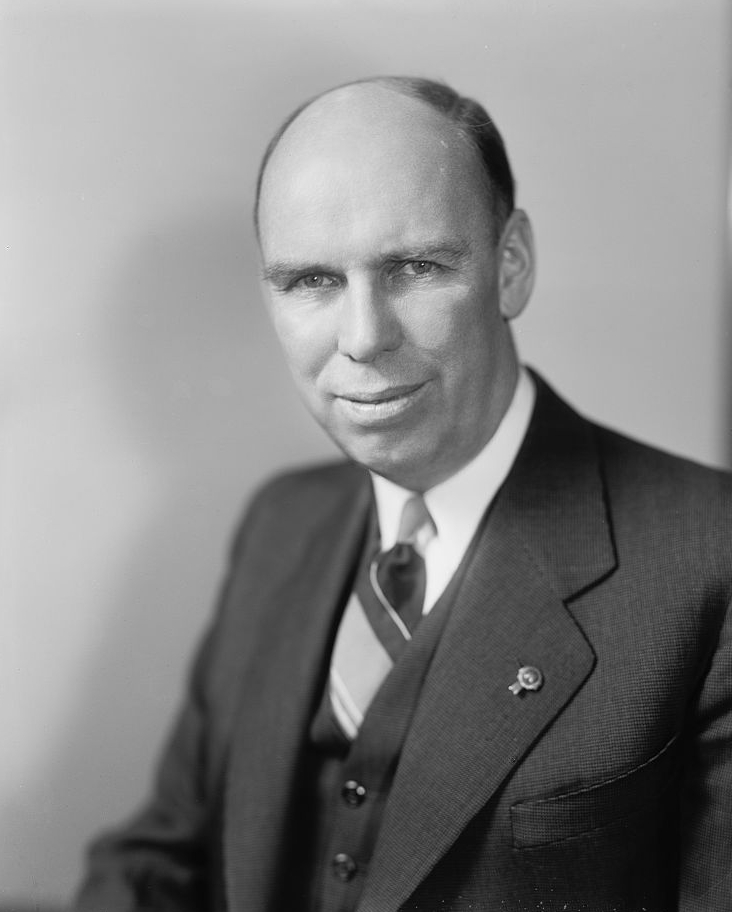

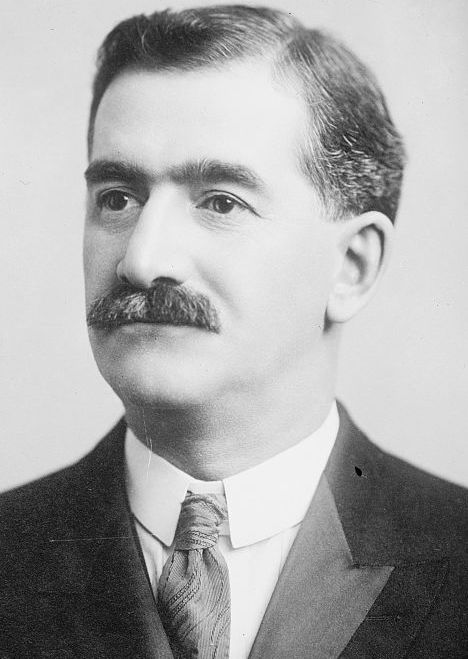
Nominee	Ralph Owen Brewster	William Robinson Pattangall
Party	Republican	Democratic
Popular vote	145,281	108,626
Percentage	57.22%	42.78%
- County results Brewster: 50–60% 60–70% Pattangall: 50–60%
Governor before election
Percival P. Baxter
Republican
Elected Governor
Ralph Owen Brewster
Republican

The 1924 Maine gubernatorial election took place on September 8, 1924.

Incumbent Governor Percival P. Baxter did not seek re-election. Republican candidate Ralph Owen Brewster defeated Democratic candidate William Robinson Pattangall. Frank G. Farrington unsuccessfully ran for the Republican nomination.

== Results ==
1924 Maine gubernatorial election (Note: Some sources give Brewster's vote as 145,251.)
Party	Candidate	Votes	%	±%
Republican	Ralph Owen Brewster	145,281	57.22%	
Democratic	William Robinson Pattangall	108,626	42.78%	
Majority		36,655	14.44%	
Turnout		253,907	100.00%	
Republican hold		Swing		
