= John Morrill =

John Morrill may refer to:

- John Morrill (baseball), American first baseman and manager in Major League Baseball
- John Morrill (historian), British historian and academic
- John Morrill (Wisconsin pioneer) (1826–1907), Wisconsin state legislator
- John A. Morrill, American state court judge in Maine
