= Judge Tenney =

Judge Tenney

- Asa Wentworth Tenney (1833–1897), judge of the United States District Court for the Eastern District of New York
- Charles Henry Tenney (1911–1994), judge of the United States District Court for the Southern District of New York

== See also ==
- John S. Tenney (1793–1869), justice of the Maine Supreme Judicial Court
