= Thomas H. Haskell =

American judge

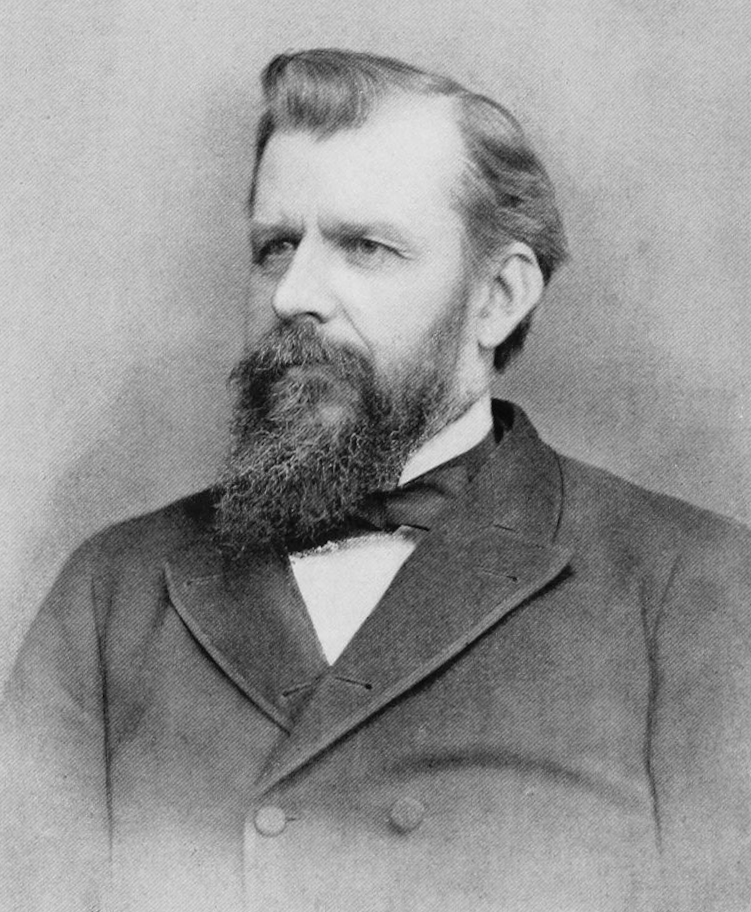
Judge Thomas H. Haskell

Thomas Hawes Haskell (May 18, 1842 – September 24, 1900), of Portland, Maine, was a justice of the Maine Supreme Judicial Court from March 31, 1884 to September 24, 1900.

== Early life, military service, and career ==
Born in New Gloucester, Maine, Haskell was the youngest son of Peter and Betsey (Hawes) Haskell, and was reared as a farmer's boy. His paternal ancestors were Welshmen: two brothers of whom immigrated to Cape Ann from Wales. Some of their descendants settled in New Gloucester before the American Revolution.

Haskell was accepted to enter Bowdoin College in 1862, but instead served as a soldier in the American Civil War, entering the 25th Maine Regiment of Infantry, Colonel Francis Fessenden, and served as a non-commissioned officer with his regiment in Virginia. It was a nine months' regiment, and after his discharge, in the summer of 1863, he entered the office of Judge Morrill, of Auburn, Androscoggin County, as a student at law. He read law to gain admission to the bar, being admitted in 1865. He remained with Morrill until 1866, when he moved to Portland, Maine in 1866.

== Public service ==
He served as a member of the Portland City Council, and as county attorney for a part of a term, in 1870, being appointed by the court to fill a vacancy, and again in 1878. He was again appointed to the office by the Governor in 1879, serving until the expiration of the term. He was also a commissioner of the Circuit Court of the United States. He was for a time the law partner of the late Judge Goddard of the Superior Court for Cumberland County, of former Minister to Sweden W. W. Thomas Jr., and of Nathan Webb at the time Webb was appointed United States District Judge for Maine in 1882.

In 1881 Haskell was appointed by Governor Plaisted to a commission to investigate abuses in the Reform School, and wrote and secured the passage of a law approved March 15, 1883 to govern that institution. The law established regulations for the prevention of abuses, established a mechanical school, and provided for a woman visitor and a letter-box for boys to deposit letters without scrutiny of the officers of the school.

On March 31, 1884, Haskell was appointed as an associate justice to the state supreme court. He served in that capacity until his death, at the age of 58.

== Publications ==
- The New Gloucester Centennial (1875)

Political offices
Preceded by Joseph W. Symonds	Justice of the Maine Supreme Judicial Court; 1884–1900	Succeeded by Henry C. Peabody
