= Guy H. Sturgis =

American judge (1877–1951)

Sturgis in 1919

Guy Hayden Sturgis (March 3, 1877 – January 18, 1951) of Portland, Maine, was a long-serving Justice of the Maine Supreme Judicial Court from August 13, 1923, to March 8, 1949, serving as Chief Justice after August 8, 1940.

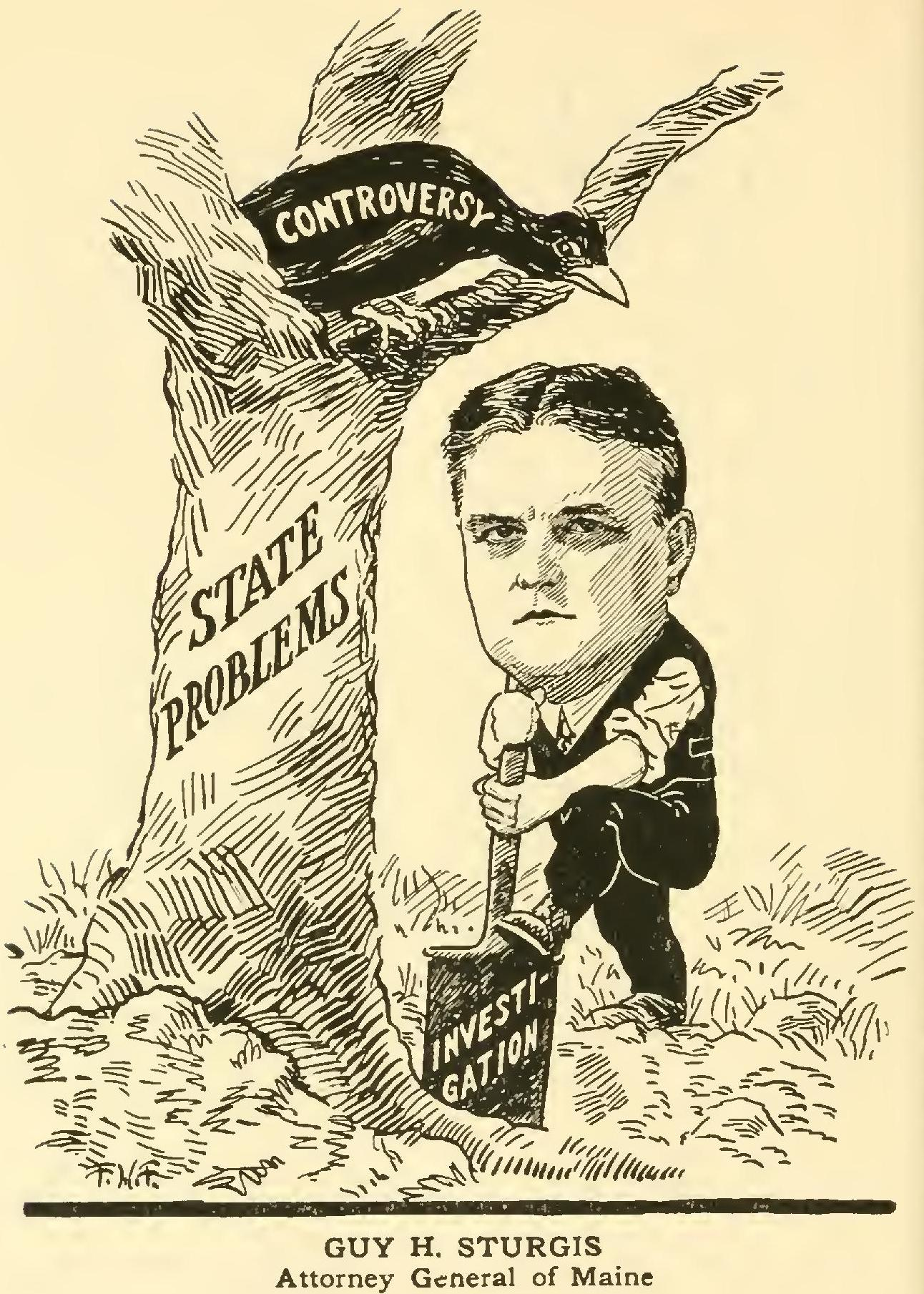
Guy H. Sturgis, Attorney General of Maine, 1918 art from book, Mother Goose Comes to Portland

Born in New Gloucester, Maine, Sturgis was educated in the town's common schools, and graduated from Bowdoin College in 1898. He received a law degree from Columbia University Law School in 1899, and studied law at the office of Thomas Brackett Reed. Sturgis served as Maine Attorney General from 1917 to 1920 and was succeeded by Ransford W. Shaw.

Political offices
| Preceded by Albert Spear | Justice of the Maine Supreme Judicial Court; 1923–1949 | Succeeded by Harold H. Murchie |
