= Senator Farrington =

Senator Farrington may refer to:

- Frank G. Farrington (1872–1933), Maine State Senate
- James Farrington (1791–1859), New Hampshire State Senate
- Joseph R. Farrington (1897–1954), Hawaii Territorial Senate
