= Enoch Foster =

American judge (1839–1913)

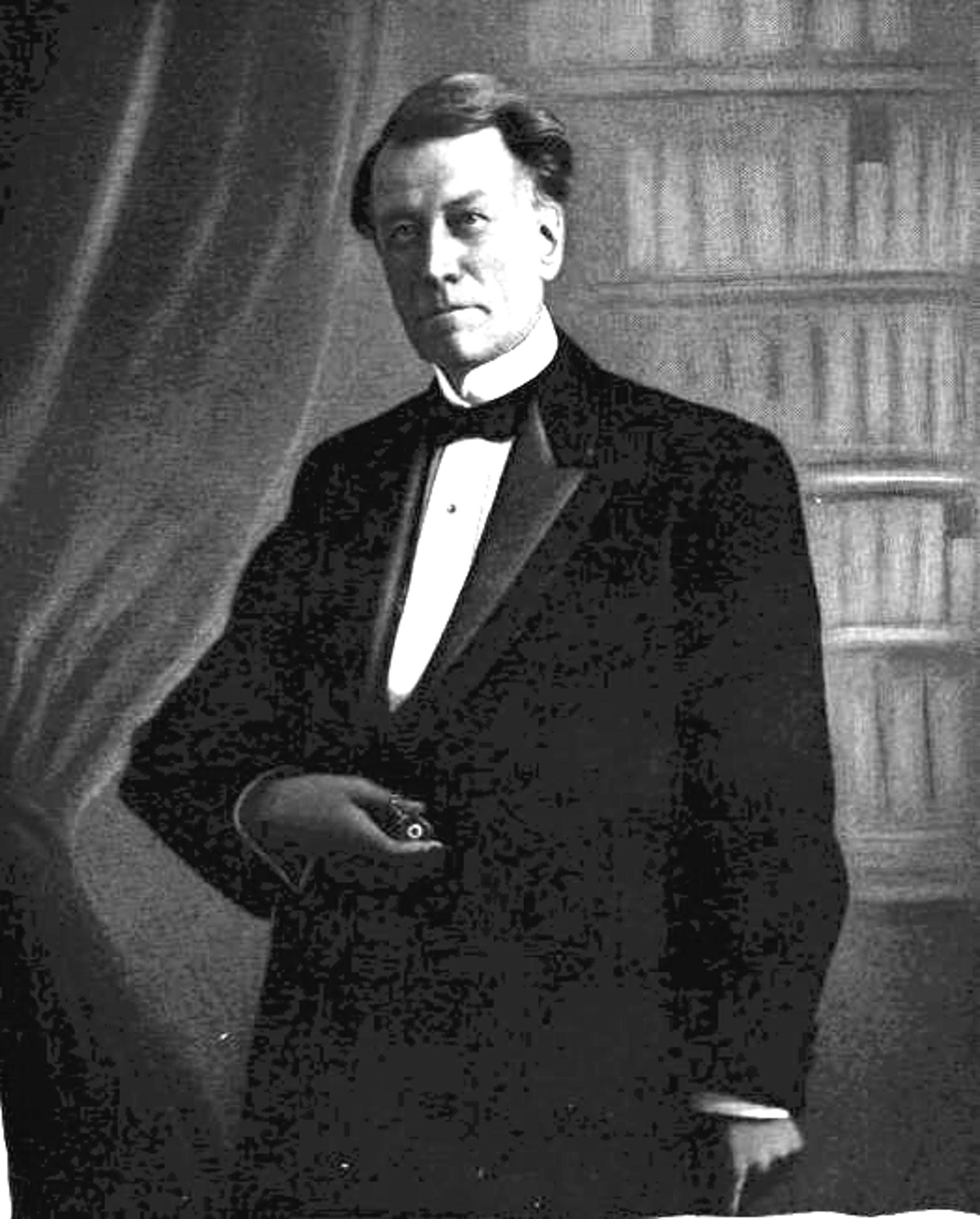
Enoch Foster, Justice of the Maine Supreme Judicial Court

Enoch Foster (May 10, 1839 – November 15, 1913) was a justice of the Supreme Judicial Court of Maine.

== Biography ==
Enoch Foster was born in Newry, Maine, on May 10, 1839, and was of Puritan Yankee ancestry. He attended Bates College (then called the Maine State Seminary), graduating in 1860. He enrolled in Bowdoin College in 1860 and graduated four years later after receiving credit for serving in the 13th Regiment of the Maine Volunteer Infantry during the American Civil War with his second degree. After returning from the war, Foster studied law at Albany Law School and studied under his cousin, a lawyer named Reuben Foster. He passed the bar exam in New York and Maine. Governor Frederick Robie appointed Foster to the Maine Supreme Judicial Court in 1884, a positioned in which he had been re-appointed in 1891.

He married Adeline Lowe in 1864. They had a son who died, which led Lowe to suicide via morphine overdose in 1872. Foster married Sarah Chapman in 1873 after Lowe's death in 1872. Chapman came from a prominent family in Bethel. He and Chapman had one son.

In 1894, Hiram Perkins established his own barber shop a few blocks away from Foster's house. In 1896, he met a 15-year-old E. L. Perkins, the shopowner's daughter. Sarah had tried to persuade him to stay away from the girl. William Penn Whitehouse tried to get Foster to stop, but Foster ignored his and Sarah's pleas.

Being a member of the local Congregational Church, the Rev. Israel Jordon decided to confront him. Knowing that this would cause a lot of controversy, he resigned before confronting him. In February of 1896, Foster was observed twice at E. L. Perkins' home. Jordon demanded he stay away from the girl and her home, which led Foster to stand before the congregation and apologize for his sins. On Easter, he was seen with Perkins again, this time at the Falmouth Hotel. The church invited him to explain himself again, and Foster refused, leading the Church to excommunicate him. The Women's Christian Temperance Union had been documenting his behavior, including hotel stays with her when she was 15. At this point, she was older and had moved to study music in Baltimore. The WCTU demanded he leave the bench and delivered several warnings about telling Governor Llewellyn Powers of his behavior, Foster continued his predatory behavior, leading the Union to involve the governor, writing:

…after careful deliberation we are forced to the painful conclusion, based upon reliable evidence, voluntarily brought to our attention, that the conduct of Judge Enoch Foster . . . in spite of the warnings of friends and expulsion from the church still continues to be so grossly immoral and notoriously scandalous as to demand the most public remonstration from all thoughtful and responsible citizens against his reappointment.

— Women's Christian Temperance Union, Kennebec Journal, December 29, 1897.

At the end of his second term, Governor Powers decided to not reappoint Foster, and Foster retired.

After stepping down from the Supreme Court, Foster co-founded the law firm of Foster and Hersey with Oscar Hersey, representing a major role in several important cases, and remained active in the Republican Party, the Freemasons, Grand Army of the Republic and Odd Fellows.

Enoch Foster died in Portland, Maine, on November 15, 1913, and was buried at Evergreen Cemetery.
