= Nathan Weston =

American judge (1782–1872)

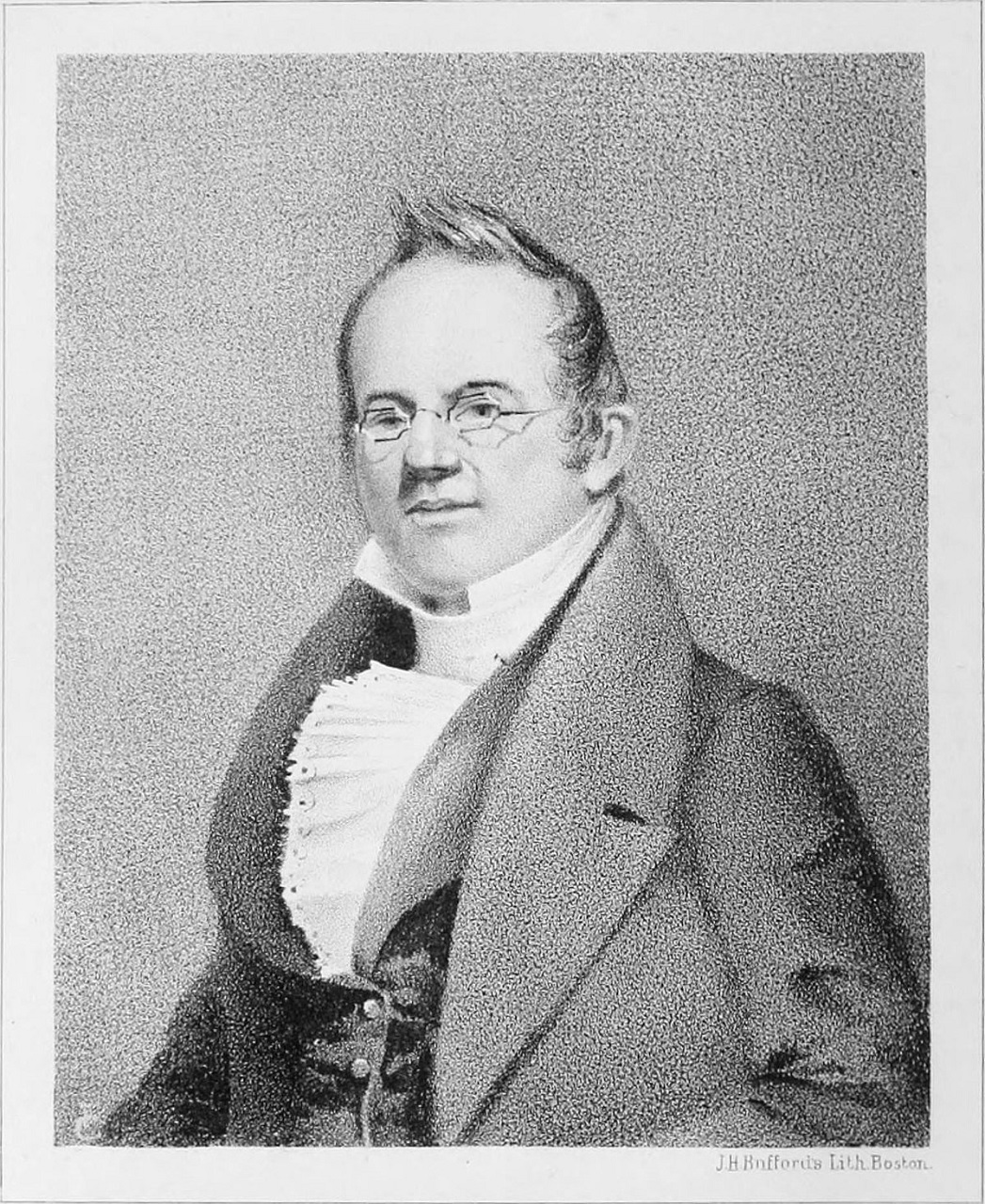

Nathan Weston (July 1782 – 1872) was an American judge who was justice of the Maine Supreme Judicial Court from July 1, 1820, to October 21, 1841, serving as chief justice from October 22, 1834, to October 21, 1841.

== Biography ==
Born in Augusta, Weston graduated from Dartmouth College in 1803 and read law to gain admission to the bar in Boston, Massachusetts, in July 1806. He was appointed Chief Justice of the 2nd Circuit Court of the District of Maine in 1811, and then Associate Justice Supreme Judicial Court July 1, 1820, becoming chief justice on October 22, 1834, and serving in that capacity until October 21, 1841. He died in Augusta.

In 1827, he purchased what is now known as the Fuller-Weston House. His grandson, Melville Weston Fuller, was the eighth Chief Justice of the United States from 1888 to 1910.

Political offices
Preceded by Prentiss Mellen	Justice of the Maine Supreme Judicial Court; 1820–1841	Succeeded by Ezekiel Whitman
