= George B. Barnes =

American politician (1904–1979)

Speaker of the Maine House of Representatives
- In office 1945–1947
- Preceded by: F. Ardine Richardson
- Succeeded by: John F. Ward

Personal details
- Born: October 17, 1904 Norway, Maine, U.S.
- Died: August 8, 1979 (aged 74) Houlton, Maine, U.S.
- Resting place: Evergreen Cemetery; Houlton, Maine, U.S.
- Party: Republican
- Relations: Charles P. Barnes (father)
- Education: Colby College; Harvard Law School
- Occupation: Lawyer

George Butler Barnes (October 17, 1904 – August 8, 1979) was an American politician who was the Speaker of the Maine House of Representatives from 1945 to 1947.

== Early life ==
Barnes was born in Norway, Maine on October 17, 1904. He was the fourth of six children born to Charles P. and Annie Maude (Richardson) Barnes. The family moved to Houlton, Maine in 1911. Barnes graduated from the Ricker Classical Institute in 1922, Colby College in 1926, and Harvard Law School in 1929.

== Career ==
Barnes began practicing law in Houlton in 1929. He served as town's attorney, was chairman of its planning board, and a member of its school committee. From 1933 to 1939, he was Aroostook County Attorney. From 1941 to 1946, he was an officer in the Maine State Guard, retiring with the rank of Captain.

Barnes was a member of the Maine House of Representatives from 1943 to 1946. In 1945, he defeated he defeated Leslie E. Jacobs and James B. Perkins to become speaker of the house, a position his father once held.

Rather than seek reelection, Barnes ran for the Maine Senate in 1946. He served three terms in the Senate and served as chairman of the judiciary committee during the latter two. He sought the Senate presidency in 1949, but lost to Burton M. Cross. Barnes did not seek reelection in 1952.

In 1954, Barnes was appointed to the Maine Judicial Council by Governor Burton M. Cross. The council, which was responsible for studying the state's judicial system, had been created by a 1935 law, but the law had not been invoked until 1954. Barnes was reappointed in 1958 by Governor Edmund Muskie.

== Death ==
Garnes died on August 8, 1979, at a nursing home in Houlton.
