= Calais Middle/High School =

Location
- 34 Blue Devil Hill; Calais, Maine 04619; United States; 45°09′51″N 67°14′30″W

Information
- Former names: Calais Academy; Calais High School
- Type: Public
- School district: Calais Public Schools
- Superintendent: Mary Anne Spearin
- Chair: Nicholas Barnett
- Principal: Chris Johnson
- Teaching staff: 24.00 (FTE)
- Grades: 7-12
- Enrollment: 300 (2023–2024)
- Student to teacher ratio: 12.50
- Language: English
- Campus type: Rural
- Colors: Blue; White
- Mascot: Blue Devil
- Nickname: Blue Devils
- Accreditation: New England Association of Schools and Colleges
- Yearbook: Broadcast
- Communities served: Calais; Robbinston
- Website: www.calaisschools.org/o/cmshs

Calais Middle/High School (Calais or CMHS) is a public middle school and high school in Calais, Maine. The high school is located in Calais Education Park, near Washington County Community College and the St. Croix Regional Technical Center.

== Athletics ==
CMHS has various varsity sports teams, including Baseball, Basketball, Cheering, Cross country, Golf, Soccer, Softball, Tennis, Track and field, Volleyball, and Wrestling.

== Extracurriculars ==
CMHS has several extracurriculars, including Student Council, Drama, Yearbook Committee, a Civil Rights Team, United States Academic Decathlon, Skills USA, Skatepark Committee, School Climate Committee, Jobs For Maine's Graduates, Band, Jazz Band, Chorus, National Honor Society, and a Math Team.

== Notable alumni ==
- Lyn Mikel Brown, academic, author, and activist
- Vinton Cassidy, politician
- George M. Hanson, judge
- Harold H. Murchie, judge and politician
- Andrea Gibson, American poet and activist

== Notable staff ==
- Franklin W. Johnson, 15th president of Colby College and former principal
