= Scott Wilson (judge) =

American judge (1870–1942)

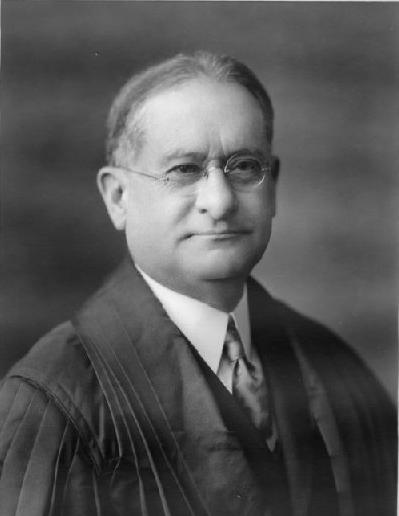

Senior Judge of the United States Court of Appeals for the First Circuit
- In office March 31, 1940 – October 22, 1942

Judge of the United States Court of Appeals for the First Circuit
- In office October 2, 1929 – March 31, 1940
- Appointed by: Herbert Hoover
- Preceded by: Charles Fletcher Johnson
- Succeeded by: Peter Woodbury

Chief Justice of the Maine Supreme Judicial Court
- In office March 1, 1925 – October 7, 1929
- Appointed by: Owen Brewster
- Preceded by: Leslie C. Cornish
- Succeeded by: Luere B. Deasy

Associate Justice of the Maine Supreme Judicial Court
- In office August 17, 1918 – March 1, 1925
- Appointed by: Carl Milliken

Attorney General of Maine
- In office 1913–1914
- Governor: William T. Haines
- Preceded by: William Robinson Pattangall
- Succeeded by: William Robinson Pattangall

Personal details
- Born: January 11, 1870 Falmouth, Maine
- Died: October 22, 1942 (aged 72) Portland, Maine
- Education: University of Pennsylvania; Bates College (AB) read law

Scott Wilson (January 11, 1870 – October 22, 1942) was a United States circuit judge of the United States Court of Appeals for the First Circuit.

== Education and career ==
Born on January 11, 1870, in Falmouth, Maine, Wilson attended the University of Pennsylvania and then received an Artium Baccalaureus degree in 1892 from Bates College. He read law in 1895, under the supervision of Joseph W. Symonds, and entered private practice in Portland, Maine from 1895 to 1918. He was city solicitor of Deering, Maine in 1899. He was an assistant county attorney of Cumberland County, Maine from 1900 to 1902. He was city solicitor of Portland from 1902 to 1905. He was the Attorney General of Maine from 1913 to 1914. He was a justice of the Maine Supreme Judicial Court from 1918 to 1929, serving as chief justice from 1925 to 1929.

== Federal judicial service ==
Wilson was nominated by President Herbert Hoover on September 9, 1929, to a seat on the United States Court of Appeals for the First Circuit vacated by Judge Charles Fletcher Johnson. He was confirmed by the United States Senate on October 2, 1929, and received his commission the same day. He was a member of the Conference of Senior Circuit Judges (now the Judicial Conference of the United States) in 1939. He assumed senior status on March 31, 1940. His service terminated on October 22, 1942, due to his death in Portland.

== See also ==
- List of Bates College people
- Herbert Hoover judicial appointments

== Sources ==
Legal offices
Preceded by William Robinson Pattangall	Attorney General of Maine; 1913–1914	Succeeded by William Robinson Pattangall
Preceded by Arno W. King	Chief Justice of the Maine Supreme Judicial Court; 1925–1929	Succeeded by Luere B. Deasy
Preceded by Charles Fletcher Johnson	Judge of the United States Court of Appeals for the First Circuit; 1929–1940	Succeeded by Peter Woodbury
