= Leslie C. Cornish =

American judge (1854–1925)

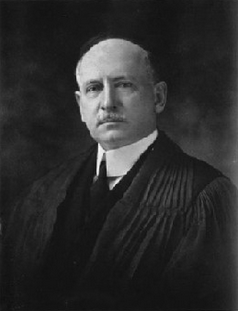

12th Chief Justice of the Maine Supreme Judicial Court
- In office June 25, 1917 – March 1, 1925
- Appointed by: Carl E. Milliken
- Preceded by: Albert R. Savage
- Succeeded by: Scott Wilson

41st Associate Justice of the Maine Supreme Judicial Court
- In office March 31, 1907 – June 25, 1917
- Nominated by: William T. Cobb
- Preceded by: Albert R. Savage
- Succeeded by: Albert M. Spear

Personal details
- Born: October 8, 1854 Winslow, Maine, U.S.
- Died: June 24, 1925 (aged 70)
- Spouse: Fannie Holmes (m. 1883)
- Education: Colby College

Leslie Colby Cornish (October 8, 1854 – June 24, 1925) was an American jurist who served as the chief justice of the Maine Supreme Judicial Court from 1917 to 1925.

== Personal ==
Cornish was born on October 8, 1854, in Winslow, Maine, to Colby Coombs Cornish and Pauline Bailey (Simpson) Cornish. He was educated first at the Winslow public schools, then at the Coburn Classical Institute. Cornish graduated from Colby College with high honors in 1875.

== Career ==
After Colby, Cornish began a career in education, serving as both teacher and principal of Petersborough High School in New Hampshire. He read law at the firm of Baker & Baker in Augusta for one year before entering Harvard Law School. He attended Harvard Law for only one year before returning to Maine, and was admitted to the Kennebec Bar in November 1880.

In 1878, Cornish was elected by the Town of Winslow to a single term in the Maine House of Representatives. He also served on the Common Council and Board of Aldermen for the City of Augusta. He served as the Chair of the Colby College Board of Trustees from 1907 to 1926.

On March 31, 1907, Cornish was appointed an associate justice of the Maine Supreme Judicial Court by Governor William T. Cobb. He served until June 25, 1917, when he was appointed Chief Justice by Governor Carl E. Milliken. In 1922, Cornish was selected to join United States Supreme Court Chief Justice of the United States William Howard Taft on a Committee for the American Bar Association to draft a code of judicial ethics. Cornish resigned from the Court on March 1, 1925, due to ill health. Cornish died on June 24, 1925, at the age of 71.
