= 1922 Maine gubernatorial election =

- September 11, 1922
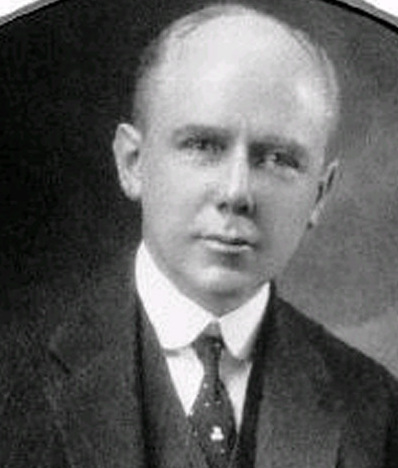

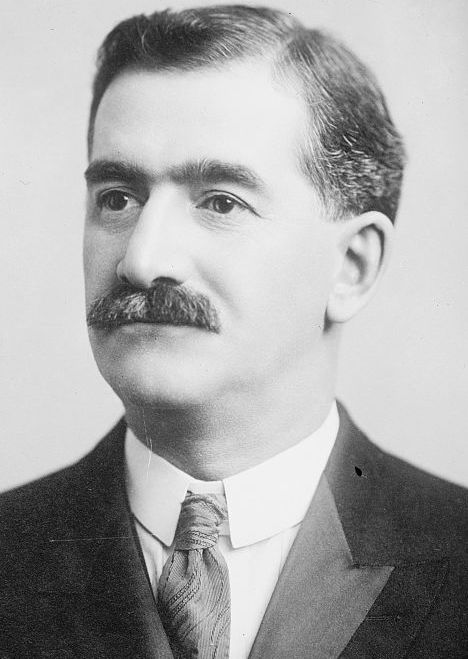
Nominee	Percival P. Baxter	William Robinson Pattangall
Party	Republican	Democratic
Popular vote	103,713	75,256
Percentage	57.95%	42.05%
- County results Baxter: 50–60% 60–70%
Governor before election
Percival P. Baxter
Republican
Elected Governor
Percival P. Baxter
Republican

The 1922 Maine gubernatorial election took place on September 11, 1922.

Incumbent Republican Governor Percival P. Baxter succeeded to the Governorship in 1921 when his predecessor Frederic Hale Parkhurst died just 26 days into his term. Baxter was re-elected to a second term in office, defeating Democratic candidate William Robinson Pattangall.

== Results ==
1922 Maine gubernatorial election (Note: Some sources give Pattangall's vote as 75,226.)
Party	Candidate	Votes	%	±%
Republican	Percival P. Baxter (incumbent)	103,713	57.95%	
Democratic	William Robinson Pattangall	75,256	42.05%	
Majority		28,457	15.90%	
Turnout		178,969	100.00%	
Republican hold		Swing		
