= Jonas Cutting =

American judge (1800–1876)

Jonas Cutting (November 3, 1800 – August 19, 1876), of Bangor, Maine, was a justice of the Maine Supreme Judicial Court from April 20, 1854, to April 20, 1875.

Born in Croydon, New Hampshire, Cutting graduated from Dartmouth College in 1823, and read law to gain admission to the bar in 1826. He settled in Bangor, Maine, in 1831, and was appointed as an associate justice on April 20, 1854, by Governor William G. Crosby, serving in that capacity until his retirement on April 20, 1875. He died in Bangor.

Political offices
Preceded by Samuel Wells	Justice of the Maine Supreme Judicial Court; 1854–1875	Succeeded by Artemas Libbey
