= John Appleton (judge) =

American judge (1804–1891)

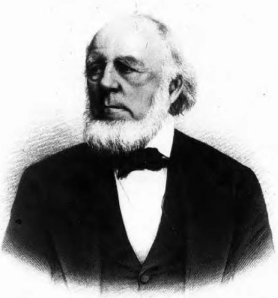

6th Chief Justice of Maine
- In office October 24, 1862 – September 20, 1883
- Appointed by: Governor Israel Washburn Jr.
- Preceded by: John S. Tenney
- Succeeded by: John A. Peters

Associate Justice of the Maine Supreme Judicial Court
- In office May 11, 1852 – October 24, 1862
- Appointed by: Governor John Hubbard

Personal details
- Born: December 7, 1804 New Ipswich, New Hampshire, U.S.
- Died: February 7, 1891 (aged 86) Bangor, Maine, U.S.
- Resting place: Mt. Hope Cemetery, Bangor, Maine
- Party: Republican
- Spouse: Sarah Newcomb Appleton (née Allen) (m. 1834; died 1874) Annie V. Appleton (née Greely) (m. 1876)
- Children: John • Frederic • Sarah • Henry • Edward
- Parent(s): John Appleton, Sr. Elizabeth Appleton (née Peabody)
- Education: Bowdoin College (B.A.)(M.A.)

John Appleton (July 12, 1804 – February 7, 1891) was a prominent American legal reformer, jurist, and scholar in the fields of constitutional economics and classical liberalism.

Appleton is known for his jurisprudence in rules of evidence and individual rights, and was one of the first proponents of laissez-faire constitutionalism, decades before the doctrine was mainstreamed across the United States under the Lochner Court. Appleton corresponded regularly with famous British philosopher John Stuart Mill and was considered very influential on his work.

Appleton served as Chief Justice of the Maine Supreme Judicial Court from May 11, 1852, to September 19, 1883. While on the bench, Appleton led the court to strike down a number of post-Civil War economic subsidies passed by the Maine Legislature and local governments. Appleton famously argued that state and local authorities had little to no authority in encouraging the movement of capital to stimulate economic growth. Amongst his contemporaries, Appleton was also unusually sympathetic towards African-American equality.

== Early life and education ==
John Appleton was born on July 12, 1804, to John and Elizabeth Appleton in New Ipswich, New Hampshire. Appleton's mother Elizabeth died when he was the age of four, and he was subsequently raised by an aunt. He received his primary education in his hometown at New Ipswich Academy.

He was sent away at fourteen to live with his uncle, Jesse Appleton, who was at the time president of Bowdoin College in Brunswick, Maine. Jesse Appleton's daughter, Jane Pierce, would go on to be the First Lady of the United States. Jesse Appleton allowed John to matriculate in the college despite his age. Unusually, Appleton was able to complete courses and graduate from Bowdoin in the usual four years at the age of just eighteen. Unable to afford the fees associated with legal education at such a young age, Appleton taught for a year. He was initially an assistant teacher at Dummer Academy in Byfield, Massachusetts, before becoming a full-time teacher in Watertown. There, one of Appleton's students was Benjamin Robbins Curtis, who would go on to be one of only two Associate Justice of the US Supreme Court to dissent in Dred Scott v. Sandford.

Later that same year, Appleton moved to Groton, Massachusetts, where he read law under the direction of George F. Farley. Shortly thereafter, he moved back to Maine to study under his relative Nathan Dane Appleton, who owned a law practice in Alfred in York County. In 1825 he received a Master of Arts from Bowdoin College. He was admitted to the bar in 1826 in Amherst, New Hampshire.

== Legal career ==
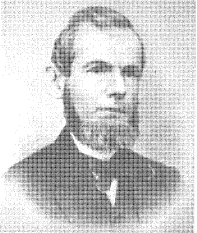
John Appleton in 1852

In 1826, the same year he was admitted to the bar, Appleton moved to Dixmont, Maine to start his own legal practice, before moving the practice shortly thereafter to Sebec in Piscataquis County. Appleton spent several years in Sebec before moving himself to the coast to settle in Bangor in 1832, where he would maintain residence until his death.

In Bangor, Appleton established a new law firm with Elisha Hunt Allen named Appleton & Allen. The firm would continue for eight years until Allen was elected to Congress in 1840. Appleton's connections through Allen allowed the former to rapidly move up in Maine politics. In the same year that Allen took up his seat in Washington, Appleton was appointed to be the Reporter of Decisions for the Maine Supreme Judicial Court.

Appleton continued to practice law during his employment to Maine's highest court. He entered into a partnership with John B. Hill of Bangor, and thereafter with his cousin Moses L. Appleton. His various practices achieved considerable success and gave Appleton a size-able wealth.

In 1850 Appleton chaired a commission appointed by the Maine Legislature to study modernizing the state's court system. Appleton's final report to the legislature on behalf of the commission recommended sweeping revisions to the structure of the judicial system. These included increasing the number of Supreme Judicial Court justices, expanding its jurisdiction to virtually every type of case on appeal, and removing the ability for Maine judges to hear appeals from lower court decisions they also presided over. His recommendation was adopted as the Court Reorganization Act of 1852.

== Judicial career ==
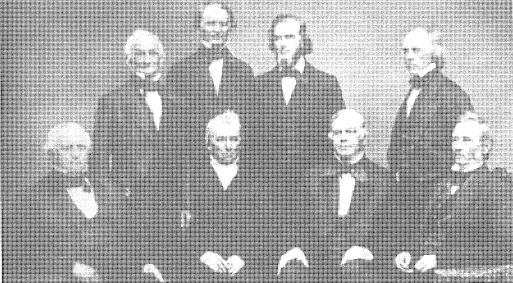
Photo of the Supreme Judicial Court in 1859 under Chief Justice John S. Tenney. John Appleton is pictured standing on the right.

=== Overview of service ===
12 years after being appointed Reporter of Decisions, Appleton was appointed by Governor John Hubbard on May 11, 1852, to serve on the Maine Supreme Judicial Court as an associate justice to fill one of the seats created by Appleton's own recommendation to the legislature.

Appleton received national recognition at the time for his efforts to reform rules of evidence. Appleton was an opponent of the prevailing legal philosophy of the time that assumed juries could not rationally discern between reliable and unreliable testimony and evidence. He advocated for the removal of rules that excluded the personal testimony of parties and other personal witnesses in civil suits. Appleton argued that juries should be presented with all relevant evidence and be examiners of fact over evidence as much as they were over criminal culpability. Appleton strongly advocated for the right of a criminal defendant to testify on their own behalf. In 1856 Maine became one of the first states in the country to permit the testimony of parties or personal witnesses in civil and criminal trials. In 1860, Appleton published his collected essays and articles laying out reforms to rules of evidence. This collection was widely circulated and helped to advance rules on testimony across the United States.

On October 24, 1862, a little more than a decade after first being called to the bench and in the wake of his national recognition in legal reform, Appleton was appointed to serve as the Chief Justice of Maine by Governor Israel Washburn.

In 1864, while Appleton was chief justice, the court ruled that judges were prohibited from commenting on the failure of a defendant to testify under their right to silence.

In 1875, the legislature asked Appleton to arrange an updated and streamlined constitution. Appleton's report was adopted by the legislature in 1876.

=== Legal philosophy ===
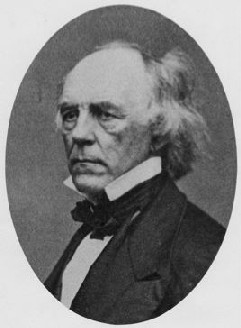
John Appleton while Chief Justice

Appleton was a known proponent of the 19th-century conception of responsible individualism, which he applied to his judicial decisions. Appleton was an avid classical liberal and argued that the constitution mandated a strong bias towards a laissez-faire capitalist economy. Appleton supported establishing a legal framework that was conducive to economic growth. Appleton was a philosophical adherent to utilitarianism, especially the works of Jeremy Bentham.

Appleton was also a proponent of legal recognition for racial minorities, advocating publicly against state laws at the time which prohibited African-Americans and Native Americans from testifying against a white person in court. Appleton corresponded regularly with John Stuart Mill, a prominent British philosopher, about racial integration and the rights of minorities in the aftermath of the Civil War. Appleton helped Mill by editing and reviewing an advance copy of the latter's The Contest in America.

Appleton was also an advocate of religious equality and separation of church and state. A universalist himself, Appleton argued in favor of removing restrictions in many states which prohibited universalists and atheists from testifying in court. In an essay published in two New England journals, Appleton wrote: “Government has no right to interfere with the religions of its citizens—it is entirely a question between them and their God”.

== Personal life ==
Appleton married Sarah Newcomb Allen, sister of his then law partner and future congressman, Elisha Hunt Allen, in 1834. He had five children, John, Frederic, Sarah, Henry, and Edward. His oldest, also named John, was a Brigadier General in the Union Army who led a significant detachment of men at the Siege of Port Hudson. Sarah died on August 12, 1874. Appleton remarried under two years later to Annie V. Greeley on March 30, 1876. Annie and John had no known children. Appleton was a member of the Unitarian Church.

In addition to his legal career, Appleton amassed a sizeable income from his land tradings in Maine timberland. He also unsuccessfully ventured in railroad and banking enterprises.

Although Appleton was not too involved in politics, he general held Jacksonian democratic political positions. He was involved in supporting the Whig Party during his time in private practice. In 1845 he was a delegate-at-large to the Penobscot County Whig convention. In later life he was a supporter of the Republican Party.

He died from heart failure at his home in Bangor on February 7, 1891.

Political offices
Preceded by John S. Tenney	Chief Justice of the Maine Supreme Judicial Court; 1862–1883	Succeeded by John A. Peters
