= Seth May =

American judge (1802–1881)

Seth May (July 2, 1802 – September 20, 1881), was a Maine attorney who served as a justice of the Maine Supreme Judicial Court from May 6, 1855 to May 7, 1862.

Born in Winthrop, Maine, May attended the Monmouth Academy and the Hallowell Academy, and "began his career as an accountant", but was unhappy with his employment, and therefore read law to gain admission to the bar in 1831. May entered the practice of law in Winthrop that year, and remained in private practice until 1855.

On May 6, 1855, May was appointed by Governor Anson Morrill as an associate justice of the state supreme court, to a seat newly created by the legislature in the previous session. In 1861, May coauthored a ruling on fugitive slaves, holding that the Fugitive Slave Act of 1850 was unconstitutional, and that the state of Maine had the right to protect alleged fugitive slaves through its own personal liberty laws. He retired from the bench on May 6, 1862, and returned to private practice, also serving as a Referee in Bankruptcy from 1867 to 1873.

He died at Auburn, Maine, at the age of 79.

Political offices
Preceded by Newly established seat	Justice of the Maine Supreme Judicial Court; 1855–1862	Succeeded by Charles W. Walton
