= Nathaniel Tompkins =

American judge and politician (1879–1949)

Justice of the Maine Supreme Judicial Court
- In office July 27, 1945 – April 22, 1949

Member of the Maine Senate
- In office 1939–1941

Member of the Maine House of Representatives
- In office 1931–1936

Personal details
- Born: May 17, 1879 Bridgewater, Maine, US
- Died: April 22, 1949 (aged 69) Houlton, Maine, US
- Party: Republican
- Education: Colby College; Harvard Law School
- Profession: Attorney

Nathaniel Tompkins (May 17, 1879 – April 22, 1949) was an American politician and jurist from Maine. He served in the Maine Senate and Maine House of Representatives. He was also a justice of the Maine Supreme Judicial Court.

== Early life ==
Tompkins was born in Bridgewater, Maine on May 17, 1879. His parents were Emma F. (née Sargent) and Nathaniel Tompkins.

Tompkins studied at the Ricker Classical Institute. He graduated from Colby College and Harvard Law School. While at Colby, he was a member of Delta Kappa Epsilon.

== Career ==
Tompkins established a private law practice in Houlton, Maine. He was president of the Houlton Savings Bank. He served on the Houlton's board of selectment from 1912 to 1913.

As a Republican, Tompkins was elected to five terms in the Maine Legislature, including three in the Maine House of Representatives and two in the Maine Senate. During his tenure in the House, he served as House Speaker from 1935 to 1936. In 1938, he was elected to the Maine Senate. After being re-elected in 1940, Tompkins elected senate president for 1941.

Governor Sumner Sewall appointed Tompkins to superior court on September 2, 1941, mid-way through his term as senate president. Four years later, on July 27, 1945, Governor Horace Hildreth appointed Tompkins to the Maine Supreme Judicial Court. Tompkins served in that position until he died in 1949.

== Personal life ==
Tompkins married Ragnhild L. Iversen on June 17, 1913. They were the parents of daughter Sigrid E. Tompkins, who also became a lawyer. Tompkins was a Freemanson.

Tompkins died on April 22, 1949 in the Aroostook County Courthouse in Houlton, Maine, at the age of 69.
