= Warren C. Philbrook =

American judge (1857–1933)

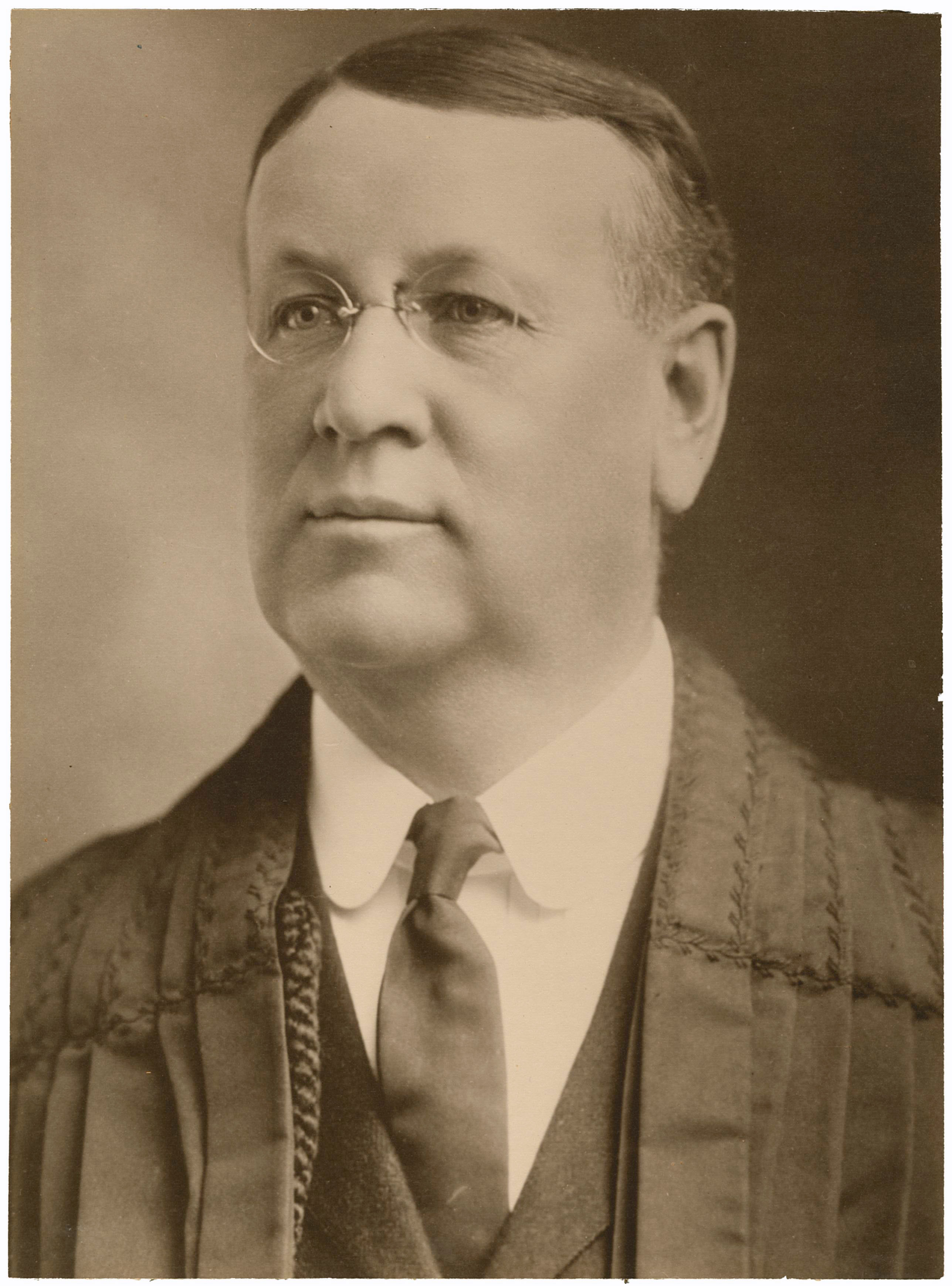

Justice of the Maine Supreme Judicial Court
- In office April 9, 1913 – November 29, 1928
- Appointed by: William T. Haines

Mayor of Waterville, Maine
- In office 1899–1901

30th Attorney General of Maine
- In office 1909–1911

Personal details
- Born: November 30, 1857 Sedgwick, Maine
- Died: May 31, 1933 (aged 75) Waterville, Maine
- Party: Republican
- Spouse: Ada M. Foster (m. 1882)
- Parents: Luther Groves Philbrook (father); Angelica Philbrook (née Coffin) (mother)
- Education: Coburn Classical Institute; Colby College
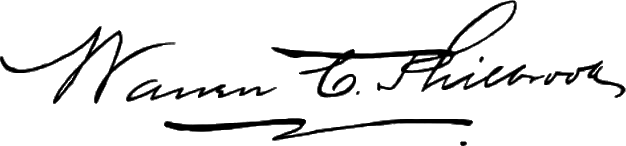
- Signature

Warren Coffin Philbrook (November 30, 1857 – May 31, 1933) was a justice of the Maine Supreme Judicial Court and Attorney General of Maine. A Republican, Philbrook served in a variety of political, legal, and judicial roles throughout the U.S. State of Maine throughout his career. Philbrook was a Freemason and a member of the Knights of Pythias, where he served as Chancellor Commander of Maine.

== Early life and education ==
Philbrook was born in 1857 in Sedgwick, Maine in Hancock County, but moved to nearby Castine, Maine after birth. He was the son of Luther Groves Philbrook and Angelia Philbrook. Philbrook attended public schools in Calais, Maine, near to his hometown. During secondary school, he attended the Coburn Classical Institute, a college preparatory school in Waterville, Maine. After high school, he attended Colby College between 1881 and 1882, and thereafter Eastern State Normal School until 1883. He married his wife, Ada M. Foster, in 1882.

Philbrook read law and was admitted to the bar of Kennebec County on October 21, 1884. He also became the principal of Waterville High School during this year. Philbook resigned from Waterville High School in 1887 to form a law firm with O.G. Hall.

== Career ==
On September 19, 1897, Philbrook became Judge of the Waterville Municipal Court. In 1899, Philbrook ran for and successfully won an election to become Mayor of Waterville. He successfully ran for a second term in 1900. Shortly thereafter he ran for and won a seat in the Maine House of Representatives. There, he served two terms, both of which on the Judiciary Committee, the second term as chairman. During his tenure he was chairman of the Republican State Committee. He also served as president of the state Board of Trade and Board of Education.

In July 1905, he was appointed to be the assistant attorney general of Maine, the first holder of that office since its creation by the legislature. In January 1909, the legislature elected Philbrook as attorney general for the state.

On April 9, 1913 he was appointed as a justice of the Maine Supreme Judicial Court by Republican governor William Haines. He served until November 9, 1928, where he retired into active retired judge status. He died on May 31, 1933.

Legal offices
Preceded by Hannibal Emery Hamlin	Maine Attorney General; 1909–1910	Succeeded by Cyrus R. Tupper
