= James Archibald =

American judge (1912–2006)

Justice of the Maine Supreme Judicial Court
- In office January 27, 1971 – January 1, 1980

Personal details
- Born: James Putnam Archibald; May 17, 1912 Houlton, Maine, U.S.
- Died: May 28, 2006 (aged 94)
- Education: Bowdoin College; Boston University
- Profession: Lawyer, judge

Military service
- Allegiance: United States
- Battles/wars: World War II

James Putnam Archibald (May 17, 1912 – May 28, 2006) was a judge of the Maine Supreme Judicial Court.

The son of a lawyer, Archibald attended Bowdoin College and law school at Boston University before returning to Houlton in 1937. He worked in his father's firm and in 1941 was elected Aroostook County attorney. After military service during World War II he was re-elected to the post.

As a special assistant attorney general, he was called to investigate the double murder of a doctor and his wife, and in 1954 led a probe into allegations of payoffs by a Maine wine distributor to the state liquor commission.

He was appointed to the Superior Court in 1957 by Governor Edmund Muskie. In 1971, Governor Kenneth M. Curtis appointed him to the Maine Supreme Judicial Court in 1971. He became an active retired justice in 1981.

Archibald was highly respected and well liked by lawyers and fellow judges. Former Maine Chief Justice Vincent L. McKusick eulogized him as "the grand old man of the supreme judiciary".
