= George M. Hanson =

American judge (1856–1924)

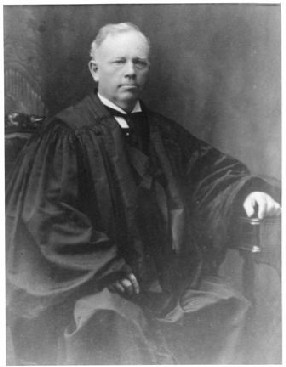

Justice of the Maine Supreme Judicial Court
- In office July 26, 1911 – April 4, 1924
- Appointed by: Frederick W. Plaisted

Personal details
- Born: August 28, 1856 Elmsville, New Brunswick
- Died: April 4, 1924 (aged 67) Portland, Maine
- Party: Democratic Party
- Education: Calais Academy, Calais, Maine

George McKay Hanson (August 28, 1856 – April 4, 1924) was a justice of the Maine Supreme Judicial Court. Born in New Brunswick, he moved to the United States in 1858. He read law and was admitted to the bar at the age of 21.

== Early life and education ==
Hanson was born on August 28, 1856 in Elmsville, New Brunswick. Hanson immigrated to the United States when he was two years old in 1858 with his parents. His family settled in Calais, Maine, just 20 miles from Elmsville across the US-Canada border. He graduated from Calais Academy, the predecessor to what is today Calais High School, at the age of 19

Hanson read law at the law office of Archibald MacNichol. He was admitted to the bar of Washington County in 1877, at the age of 21.

== Political career ==
Hanson ran for, and was elected to be, Mayor of Calais in 1885, and again in 1905. He also served concurrently from 1895 until his appointment to the bench as Collector of Customs for the federal government within the Passamaquoddy District, today known as the Passamaquoddy Indian Township Reservation. Hanson was appointed to this role by President Grover Cleveland.

He made four unsuccessful attempts to run for the US House of Representatives to represent Maine's 4th Congressional District. The first election, in 1906, he was defeated by Republican incumbent Llewellyn Powers. After Powers's death, Hanson lost again in a special election to fill the seat on September 14, 1908, to Republican Frank E. Guernsey. He again lost to Guernsey in the regular election in November of that year, and a fourth time in 1910.

Hanson was one of Maine's delegates to the Democratic National Convention in 1904.

== Judicial career ==
Hanson was appointed to the Maine Supreme Judicial Court on July 26, 1911, by Democratic Governor Frederick W. Plaisted. He was the second appointment to Maine's highest court under Plaisted's tenure, the other being George F. Haley.

He was reappointed on July 26, 1918, by Governor Carl Milliken, serving thereafter until his death on April 4, 1924.
