= Frank G. Farrington =

American judge (1872–1933)

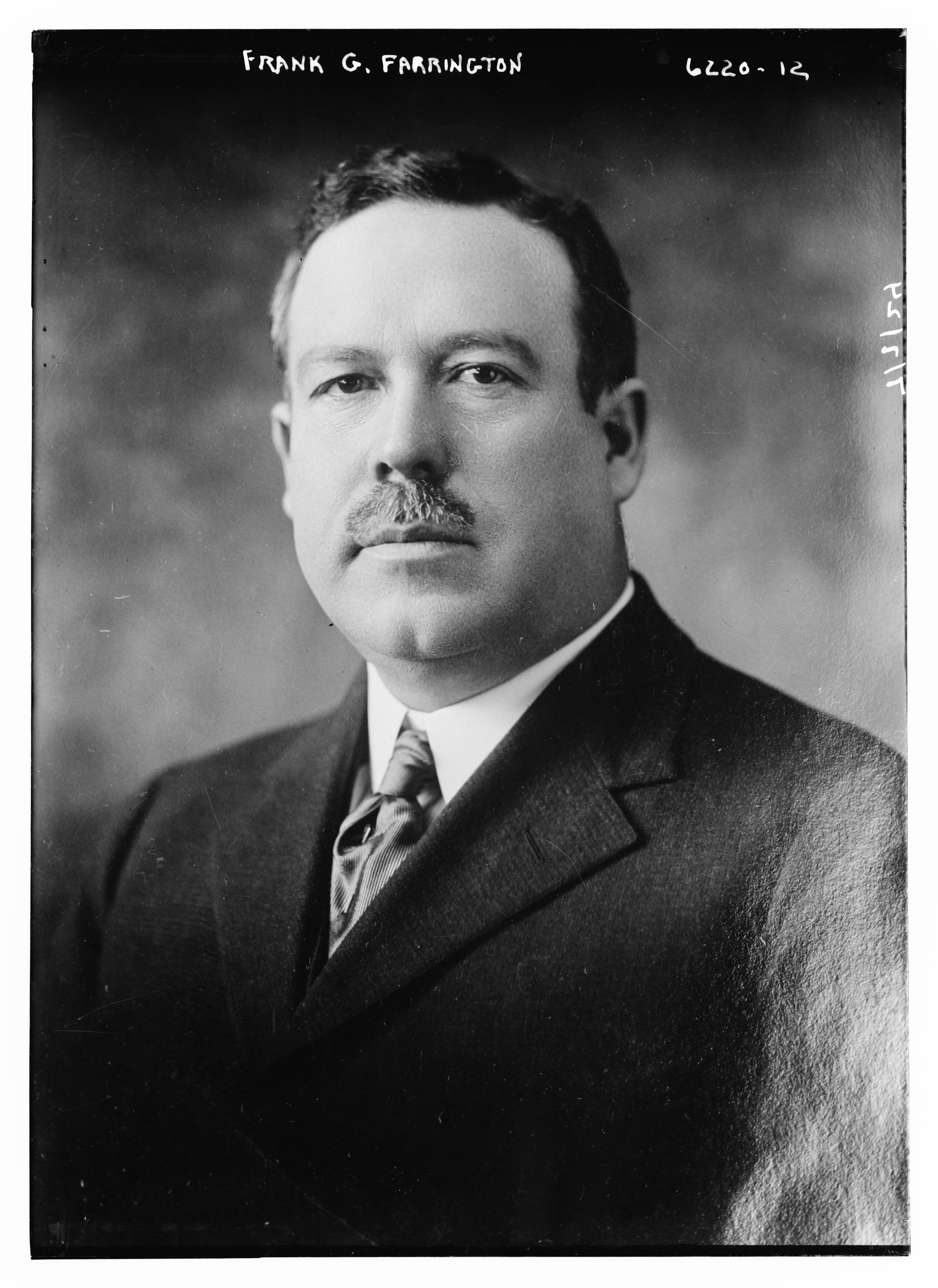
- Frank G. Farrington in 1924

Member of the Maine House of Representatives
- In office 1916–1920

Member of the Maine Senate
- In office 1920–1924

Associate Justice, Maine Supreme Judicial Court
- In office November 16, 1928 – September 3, 1933
- Preceded by: Warren C. Philbrook
- Succeeded by: James H. Hudson

Personal details
- Born: September 11, 1872
- Died: September 3, 1933 (aged 60) Augusta, Maine, U.S.
- Party: Republican
- Education: Bowdoin College; Harvard Law School
- Profession: Attorney

Frank George Farrington (September 11, 1872 – September 3, 1933) was an American lawyer and politician from Maine. Farrington, a Republican from Augusta, severed four terms in the Maine Legislature, including two in the Maine House of Representatives and two in the Maine Senate. He lost the Republican gubernatorial primary in 1924 to Ku Klux Klan-backed Ralph Owen Brewster by just 581 votes.

== Political career ==
Farrington was a graduate of Bowdoin College (1894) and Harvard Law School. Prominent in Augusta politics, he was a member of the city's Board of Education for nine years prior to running for the Legislature, including two years as chairman. He was first elected to the House in 1916, and was re-elected in 1918. During his second term, he was chosen Speaker of the Maine House of Representatives. In 1920, he successfully sought a seat in the Senate. On January 31, 1921, Governor Frederic Hale Parkhurst died after just 26 days in office and was replaced by Senate President Percival P. Baxter. Farrington was then elected Senate President pro tempore. Re-elected in 1922, he was re-elected Senate President, this time under Governor Baxter.

=== Gubernatorial primary ===
In 1924, Farrington sought the Republican nomination for Governor. He initially won the June primary by 320 votes. During the recount, Governor Baxter declared that fraud had taken place in Portland's fourth ward, which was primarily composed of Irish-American voters opposed to the Ku Klux Klan-backed opponent of Farrington, Ralph O. Brewster. In early August, his opponent, State Senator Ralph Owen Brewster, was named the nominee by a margin of just 581 votes.

=== Post electoral political career ===
Farrington was active in Augusta affairs after leaving public office in 1924. He sought to build a YMCA in the city and was a trustee of the Lithgow Public Library. He was appointed as an Associated Justice of the Maine Supreme Judicial Court by his former primary opponent Ralph Brewster on November 16, 1928 and served in that role until his death. Ill since 1928, Farrington died on September 3, 1933, at age 60.
