= Frank H. Holley =

American politician

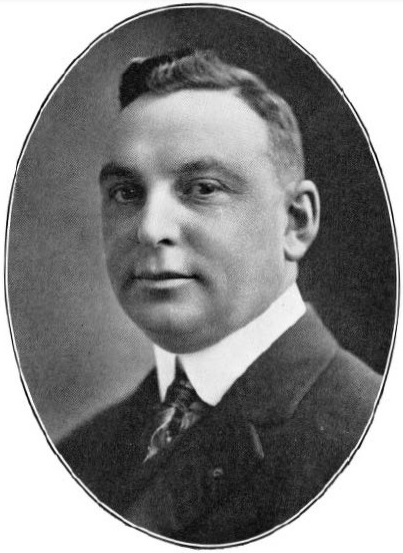
- From 1927's Maine State Legislature: Eighty-third Legislature

Member of the Maine Senate from the Somerset County district
- In office 1924–1928

Personal details
- Party: Republican

Frank H. Holley (May 19, 1880 – October 9, 1949) was an American politician from Maine. Holley, a Republican from Anson, Maine, was first elected to the Maine House of Representatives in 1916. Re-elected in 1918, 1920 and 1922, he was chosen as Speaker of the Maine House of Representatives in 1923. In 1924, he was elected to represent Somerset County in the Maine Senate. Re-elected for a second term in the Senate in 1926, Holley was elected Senate President.
