= Harold H. Murchie =

American judge (1888–1953)

Member of the Maine House of Representatives
- In office 1918–1922

Member of the Maine Senate
- In office 1928–1934

Chief Justice, Maine Supreme Judicial Court
- In office March 8, 1949 – March 7, 1953

Personal details
- Born: March 8, 1888
- Died: March 7, 1953 (aged 64)
- Party: Republican
- Education: Dartmouth College
- Profession: Attorney

Harold Hale Murchie (March 8, 1888 – March 7, 1953) was an American politician and judge from Maine. Murchie, a Republican from Calais, Maine, served for 10 years in the Maine Legislature, including two terms in the Maine House of Representatives (1918-1922) and three terms in the Maine Senate (1928-1934). He was elected Senate President for his final term in 1933–1934.

He was appointed to the Maine Supreme Judicial Court on March 8, 1949, which was Murchie's 61st birthday. He died in office almost exactly 4 years later, on March 7, 1953.

== Early life ==
Murchie was born and raised in Calais and graduated in 1905 from Calais High School. He earned a Bachelor of Arts at Dartmouth College, a Bachelor of Laws at Harvard University and a Doctor of Laws at Boston University. Murchie's grand daughter, Jessie Briggs Gunther, was the youngest person to serve as judge in Maine when she was appointed at the age of 28 in 1976. She was also the second woman to enter Maine's judiciary branch.
