= John S. Tenney =

American judge (1793–1869)

John Searle Tenney (January 21, 1793 – August 23, 1869), of Norridgewock, Maine, was a justice of the Maine Supreme Judicial Court from October 23, 1841, to October 23, 1862, serving as chief justice from October 23, 1855, to October 23, 1862.

Born at Rowley, Massachusetts, Tenney graduated from Bowdoin College in 1816 and read law to gain admission to the bar in 1820. He died in Norridgewock, Maine.

Political offices
Preceded by Nicholas Emery	Justice of the Maine Supreme Judicial Court; 1841–1855	Succeeded by Joseph Howard
Preceded by Ether Shepley	Chief Justice of the Maine Supreme Judicial Court; 1855–1862	Succeeded by John Appleton
