= Albert Spear =

American judge

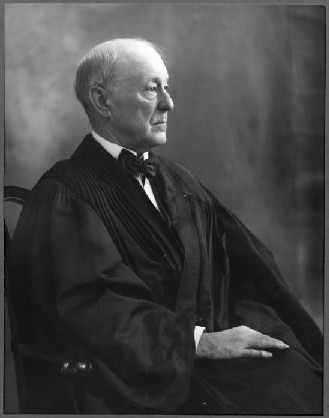
Albert Spear, Justice of the Maine Supreme Court

Albert Moore Spear (March 17, 1852 – January 31, 1929) was the Chief Justice of the Maine Supreme Judicial Court and President of the Maine Senate.

Spear was born in Madison, Maine in 1852. He graduated from Bates College in Lewiston, Maine in 1875. Spear then studied law and was admitted to the Maine bar in 1878. Spear went on to practice law and served as a city solicitor, mayor and state senator. From 1893 to 1894 he served as President of the Maine State Senate. In 1902 he was appointed to the Maine Supreme Judicial Court and he retired in 1923 but continued to hear cases as an active retired justice. Spear died in 1929 in Augusta, Maine.
