= Charles J. Dunn =

American judge (1872–1939)

Charles John Dunn

Chief Justice of the Maine Supreme Judicial Court
- In office 1935–1939

Personal details
- Born: July 14, 1872 Houghton County, Michigan, U.S.
- Died: November 10, 1939 (aged 67) Maine, U.S.
- Party: Republican
- Education: Blue Hill Academy
- Occupation: Jurist, lawyer, politician

Charles John Dunn (July 14, 1872 – November 10, 1939) was an American jurist, lawyer, and politician.

== Biography ==
Born in Houghton County, Michigan, Dunn lived in Blue Hill, Maine and graduated from Blue Hill Academy. Dunn was admitted to the Maine bar and practiced law in Orono, Penobscot County, Maine. He resided in the Nathaniel Treat House, which is now listed on the National Register of Historic Places. Dunn was involved with the Merrill Trust and Orono Trust Companies. He was also treasurer of the University of Maine. He served in the Maine House of Representatives from 1901 to 1911 and was a Republican. Dunn was appointed to the Maine Supreme Judicial Court in 1913 and served until his death in 1939. In 1935, he was appointed chief justice of the court and served until his death.
