= Maine Supreme Judicial Court =

Highest court in the U.S. state of Maine

- Seal of Maine
- Interactive map of Maine Supreme Judicial Court
- 43.659245°N 70.253701°W
- Established: 1820
- Jurisdiction: Maine
- Location: Varies; primarily Portland, Maine
- Coordinates: 43.659245°N 70.253701°W
- Authorised by: Maine Constitution
- Appeals to: Supreme Court of the United States
- Number of positions: 7
- Website: https://www.courts.maine.gov/courts/sjc/index.html

Chief Justice
- Currently: Valerie Stanfill
- Since: June 8, 2021

The Maine Supreme Judicial Court (or "Maine SJC") is the highest court in the state of Maine's judicial system. It is composed of seven justices, who are appointed by the governor and confirmed by the Maine Senate. Between 1820 and 1839, justices served lifetime appointments with a mandatory retirement age of 70. Starting in 1839, justices have been appointed for seven-year terms, with no limit on the number of terms that they may serve nor a mandatory retirement age.

Known as the Law Court when sitting as an appellate court, the Supreme Court's other functions include hearing appeals of sentences longer than one year of incarceration, overseeing admission to the bar and the conduct of its members, and promulgating rules for all the state's courts.

The Maine Supreme Judicial Court is one of the few state supreme courts in the United States authorized to issue advisory opinions, which it does upon request by the governor or legislature, as set out in the Maine Constitution.

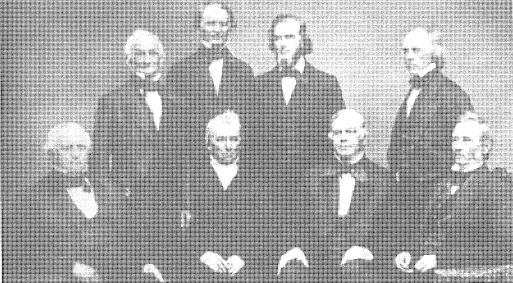
Justices from 1859-1862. Standing, from left to right: Daniel Goodenow, Richmond D. Rice, Woodbury Davis, and John Appleton. Sitting, from left to right: Edward Kent, Seth May, Chief Justice John S. Tenney, and Jonas Cutting.

It is also unusual for a state's highest appellate court in that its primary location is not that of the state's capital city, Augusta, partially because the Kennebec County Courthouse did not have a courtroom large enough for the Supreme Court's proceedings. The court did meet there from 1830 until 1970, when it permanently moved to the Cumberland County Courthouse. The renovation of the Kennebec County Courthouse in 2015, which included expansion of the bench in its largest courtroom to permit all seven justices to sit there at the same time, has allowed the court to meet there at least twice a year. It will also continue to meet in Portland, Bangor, and at high schools around the state. The new Judicial Center in Biddeford, scheduled to be completed in early 2023, will also contain a courtroom large enough to permit the court to sit there.

The Maine SJC is also authorized to rule on the fitness of the governor of Maine to serve in office, which it does upon the secretary of state certifying to the court that the governor is temporarily unable to carry out the duties of that office. The court must then hold a hearing and, if it agrees that the governor is unfit, declare the office of governor temporarily vacant and transfer its duties to the president of the Maine Senate, who would serve as acting governor. If the secretary of state later certifies to the Supreme Court that the governor is fit to resume office, the court would then decide whether it agrees.

== Current justices ==
Name	Born	Start	Term ends	Appointer	Law School
Valerie Stanfill, Chief Justice	1957 or 1958 (age 68–69)	June 8, 2021	June 8, 2028	Janet Mills (D)	Maine
Andrew Mead	1952 (age 73–74)	March 22, 2007	March 22, 2028	John Baldacci (D)	NYLS
Catherine Connors	January 26, 1959 (age 67)	February 4, 2020	February 3, 2027	Janet Mills (D)	Northwestern
Rick E. Lawrence	November 4, 1955 (age 70)	May 4, 2022	May 4, 2029	Janet Mills (D)	Harvard
Wayne R. Douglas	1951 or 1952 (age 73–74)	March 10, 2023	March 10, 2030	Janet Mills (D)	Maine
Julia M. Lipez	1980 (age 45–46)	March 28, 2025	March 28, 2032	Janet Mills (D)	Stanford
Christopher Taub	1967 or 1968 (age 58–59)	April 6, 2026	April 6, 2033	Janet Mills (D)	BU

=== Senior status ===
There are three active retired justices.

Name	Born	Service Start	Service End	Active Retirement	Appointer	Law School
Jeffrey Hjelm	September 30, 1955 (age 71)	August 1, 2014	December 2019	February 2020	Paul LePage (R)	Case Western
Thomas E. Humphrey	November 19, 1945 (age 80)	June 9, 2015	March 7, 2022	March 7, 2022	Paul LePage (R)	BC
Andrew M. Horton	August 28, 1949 (age 77)	February 4, 2020	November 14, 2025	November 14, 2025	Janet Mills (D)	Georgetown

== See also ==
- Courts of Maine
