= Swanson v. Roman Catholic Bishop of Portland =

1997 Maine Supreme Judicial Court case

- Court: Maine Supreme Judicial Court
- Full case name: Albert Swanson, et al. v. Roman Catholic Bishop of Portland, et al.
- Argued: November 5, 1996
- Decided: April 4, 1997
- Citation: 692 A.2d 441

Court membership
- Chief justice: Daniel Wathen
- Associate justices: David G. Roberts; Robert W. Clifford; Paul L. Rudman; Howard H. Dana Jr.; Kermit Lipez

Case opinions
- Majority: Wathen, joined by Roberts, Clifford, Rudman
- Dissent: Lipez, joined by Dana

Swanson v. Roman Catholic Bishop of Portland, 692 A.2d 441 (Me. 1997), was a decision of the Maine Supreme Judicial Court (Law Court) in which the court held that the First Amendment to the United States Constitution bars negligent supervision claims against a church. Albert and Ruth Swanson alleged that, while undergoing religious marital counselling with Father Maurice Morin of the Diocese of Portland, Morin had an affair with Ruth, leading to a contentious divorce. They sued Morin, the diocese, and the bishop for, among other things, negligent supervision.

The church moved to dismiss the claims against it, arguing that investigating the relationship between the church and its priests would require the court to make decisions of ecclesiastical law, in violation of the Maine Constitution and the Free Exercise Clause of the First Amendment to the United States Constitution. The Swansons responded that the claim could be resolved based on neutral principles of law, and did not pose any constitutional problems. At the time, Maine courts had not decided whether negligent supervision was even a cause of action under Maine law in the first place.

The Law Court dismissed the claims, agreeing with the church; the majority did not decide whether negligent supervision claims can be sustained under Maine law. However, the court held that even if the cause of action did exist, this particular claim would be barred by the First Amendment. Justice Kermit Lipez wrote for himself and the other dissenting justice that the court had decided the case prematurely, arguing that the case should have proceeded through trial and that the question of whether negligent supervision claims exist should have been decided before reaching a constitutional question. Most legal scholars and courts in other jurisdictions have disagreed with the Law Court's holding in Swanson. The Law Court, after sidestepping the question of negligent supervision in several subsequent cases, eventually held that the cause of action does exist in 2005.

== Background ==
=== Facts ===
The facts alleged in the lawsuit are as follows: Albert and Ruth Swanson, of Cumberland, Maine, were going through a difficult time in their marriage and considering a wedding vow renewal ceremony. They began counseling with Father Maurice Morin, a priest of the Portland Diocese of the Catholic Church, in early 1990. Morin had been ordained since 1964. Morin advised Ruth – who had been individually seeking his advice frequently – to postpone the ceremony, showing an interest in her; the two began an affair in August 1991.

According to the lawsuit, Albert then approached Morin for advice on his marriage, worrying that Ruth was attracted to another man. Morin assured Albert he would help, but when Albert later told Morin that he worried Ruth was attracted to Morin, the priest acknowledged the situation and claimed he was handling it professionally. Albert subsequently discovered the affair, at which point it ended. Ruth also met with another priest several times about her situation with Morin, ostensibly for counseling; according to the couple, the purpose of the meeting was to manipulate Ruth into accepting full responsibility for the affair. Morin advised Ruth to file for divorce, which she did that October. The proceedings turned acrimonious, and in that time, the Swanson's son Richard committed suicide, leading to their reconciliation. Citing the above, the Swansons sued the Diocese and its current bishop (the church) for negligent supervision, training, and selection, as well as fraud and breach of fiduciary duty; they also sued Morin for intentional and negligent infliction of emotional distress and negligent pastoral counseling. The fraud and fiduciary counts were dismissed by agreement.

=== Law ===
When states designate negligent supervision to be a cause of action, they generally do so under tort law, agency law, or both. The Restatement (Second) of Torts imposes a duty on an employer to exercise reasonable care to control an employee acting outside the scope of employment under certain circumstances. The Restatement (Second) of Agency, by contrast, imposes liability on employer for any harm stemming from negligence or recklessness in supervision of employees. Maine courts had not, at the time, decided whether or not to include negligent supervision as an independent cause of action.

Both the Constitution of Maine and the Free Exercise Clause of the First Amendment to the United States Constitution prevent the government of Maine from interfering with freedom of religion. The Maine Supreme Judicial Court (Law Court) laid out a balancing test in Blount v. Department of Education and Cultural Services (1988); it held that a substantial burden on the free exercise of religion can only be counterbalanced by a compelling state interest. The United States Supreme Court had held that the federal Free Exercise Clause somewhat limits the ability of courts to investigate churches. However, the Supreme Court also specified that courts are free to act where decisions can be made based on non-religious "neutral principles"; it is interpretation and application of religious doctrine that is forbidden. The Supreme Court had previously endorsed decisions of other courts relying on documentation of a church's structure and organization, finding those facts to be neutral as long as they are analyzed secularly. Prior to Swanson, many state courts had ruled that the Free Exercise Clause does not bar negligent supervision claims against churches and other religious organizations.

== Legal proceedings ==
=== Lower court ===
The lawsuit was filed in the Maine Superior Court, Cumberland County. After both sides engaged in some discovery, the church filed a motion to dismiss, arguing that they were protected from the claims against them by the First Amendment. In December 1995, the Superior Court granted the motion in part, dismissing the negligent selection and training claims but holding that the negligent supervision claim could proceed. The court examined whether each claim could be decided without "excessive entanglement in religious doctrine or polity"; selection and training, the court held, "ha[ve] been, and should remain, the sole dominion of religious organizations". But the court found that a careful, limited investigation of the church's supervision of Morin would not constitute excessive entanglement, holding that it would be based on secular principles and strongly emphasizing the public policy downsides of letting a church have the public interact with a priest that the church knows is a risk. The church appealed to the Law Court.

=== Law Court ===
On appeal, the church claimed that the Superior Court should have dismissed the supervision claim for the same reasons the it dismissed the selection and training claims. A secular court had no place, the church argued, to investigate any aspect of the employment relationship between a church and a priest, as it would inevitably involve "an inquiry of religious doctrine and a ruling on the propriety of conduct pursuant to the religious doctrine". The Swansons disagreed, arguing that the supervision claim turned on neutral, secular principles. They also emphasized the public policy aspect of the case, warning the court of the risks of allowing a church to expose the public to a known risk.

==== Opinion of the court ====
We conclude that, on the facts of this case, imposing a secular duty of supervision on the church and enforcing that duty through civil liability would restrict its freedom to interact with its clergy in the manner deemed proper by ecclesiastical authorities and would not serve a societal interest sufficient to overcome the religious freedoms inhibited.

— Swanson II at 445.

The Law Court handed down its decision in April 1997, ruling 4–2 for the church. Chief Justice Daniel Wathen, writing for the majority, did not answer whether negligent supervision is a recognized tort under Maine law; the court instead held that even if it was, the First Amendment barred bringing the claim. Rather than addressing supervision, selection, and training individually, the majority opinion was framed in broad terms, addressing "whether courts may constitutionally impose and enforce a duty of employee supervision derived from secular agency principles against a religious organization". Citing the U.S. Supreme Court cases on the First Amendment, the majority decided that they may not, concluding that the relationship between a church and a priest cannot be compared to employer–employee relationships in the secular business world. "Exploration of the ecclesiastical relationship", Wathen wrote, is "itself problematic", holding that trying to apply secular agency principles would inevitably result in an examination of church doctrine.

The Law Court acknowledged that its decision was a departure from what other courts had previously ruled; however, the majority held that those courts reached the wrong conclusion, asserting that they had not "fully addressed the fundamental issue" and "failed to maintain the appropriate degree of neutrality". In response to the Swansons' public policy argument, the majority simply held that while some public interests counterbalance the court's interest in protecting the free exercise of religion, the Swansons' claim was not one of them. The court did not, however, explicitly apply the Blount balancing test.

==== Dissent ====
I agree with the Court's broad pronouncements about the severely circumscribed role that civil courts may play in resolving disputes involving religious organizations or doctrine. The free exercise provision of the First Amendment requires that limitation. Those pronouncements, however, are set forth prematurely, in contravention of the long-established principle that we do not decide constitutional issues unnecessarily.

— Swanson II at 445–446 (Lipez, J., dissenting).

The dissent was written by Justice Kermit Lipez, joined by only one other justice; they objected on procedural grounds to the court addressing the constitutional question. On the procedural point, Lipez wrote that the court had a longstanding policy of not addressing constitutional issues unless there was no other option, given the need to properly develop the factual record. Here, there were two issues that, in Lipez's opinion, should have prevented consideration of the First Amendment issue. First, the court did not address whether the tort itself was a valid claim under Maine law. Second, the court was ruling on a motion to dismiss, meaning that the facts of the case were taken purely from the parties' pleadings; no court had made any findings of fact. Only after addressing both of those issues, Lipez argues, should the court have decided a First Amendment question. He also noted that the Swansons' allegations under the negligent supervision claim were not solely based on the employer–employee relationship; some claims were against the church directly.

Lipez later reflected that his dissent in Swanson, like others he had written, was a form of "damage control"; he had written it in the hope that over time, it would erode the persuasiveness of the majority opinion and make it easier to overrule.

== Reaction and subsequent jurisprudence ==
Legal scholars have reacted negatively to the Law Court's decision in Swanson v. Roman Catholic Bishop. Heather Klasing, writing in the Maine Law Review, called the court's analysis "disappointing"; she asserts that the U.S. Supreme Court has allowed courts to analyze church documents to resolve legal disputes, as long as they are used in the application of neutral principles of law. As such, she argues, deciding the Swansons' claim does not necessarily entail excessive entanglement, although she did agree with the Superior Court's dismissal of the negligent training and hiring claims. She also criticized the Law Court's balancing of societal interests against religious freedom, arguing that the court's analysis was cursory and failed to identify the meaningful societal interests to compare against. Ira C. Lupu and Robert Tuttle, writing in the BYU Law Review in 2004, argue that both complete immunity and a complete lack of immunity are bad approaches. Instead, they write that there should be some limits on court inquiries, such as only accepting evidence that has a clear secular interpretation under agency law, but that plaintiffs should still have a way to hold churches accountable for priest misconduct. Sonia Buck, writing in the Maine Law Review in 2005, argues that Swanson should be overturned; she points to the 2002 sexual abuse scandal in the Archdiocese of Boston as evidence that attitudes on holding churches accountable for priest misconduct have changed.

Courts in other jurisdictions have largely not followed the Law Court's decision in Swanson when presented with similar questions. The Supreme Court of Florida refused to dismiss claims of negligent supervision of a church whose priest was accused of molesting a child and an adult, reasoning that "classic" neutral principles of agency law could resolve the dispute without investigating religious doctrine. Other courts reaching similar conclusions include the Washington Supreme Court, the Connecticut Superior Court, and the United States District Court for the District of Rhode Island. New York and Wisconsin courts, on the other hand, have generally agreed with Swanson.

Swanson left the question of whether negligent supervision exists under Maine law unresolved. In several subsequent cases over the next few years, the Law Court sidestepped the opportunity to clarify the question the same way it had in Swanson – reasoning that even if negligent supervision did exist, that it would not apply to the case at hand, and that there was therefore no need to decide in that case whether the tort existed. In 2002, however, the Boston Archdiocese sexual abuse scandal began garnering national attention, giving a new urgency to the issue. In Fortin v. Roman Catholic Bishop – a 2005 case revolving around a minor's sexual abuse allegations against a priest – the Law Court ruled that negligent supervision claims exist where the plaintiff can show a "special relationship" between them and the defendant. The Law Court explained that a special relationship existed in Fortin because "a child who is both a student and an altar boy is subject to the supervision, control, and authority of the Diocese on a daily basis" and that the Bishop "knew or should have known of the risk of harm posed by the priest who abused Fortin". Explicitly applying the Blount balancing test, the court found that "social interests are at their zenith" in a case like Fortin, whereas religious exercise was not burdened by the claim because doctrinal matters were not involved.
