= University of Maine School of Law Building =

Coordinates: 43.6611°N 70.2789°W

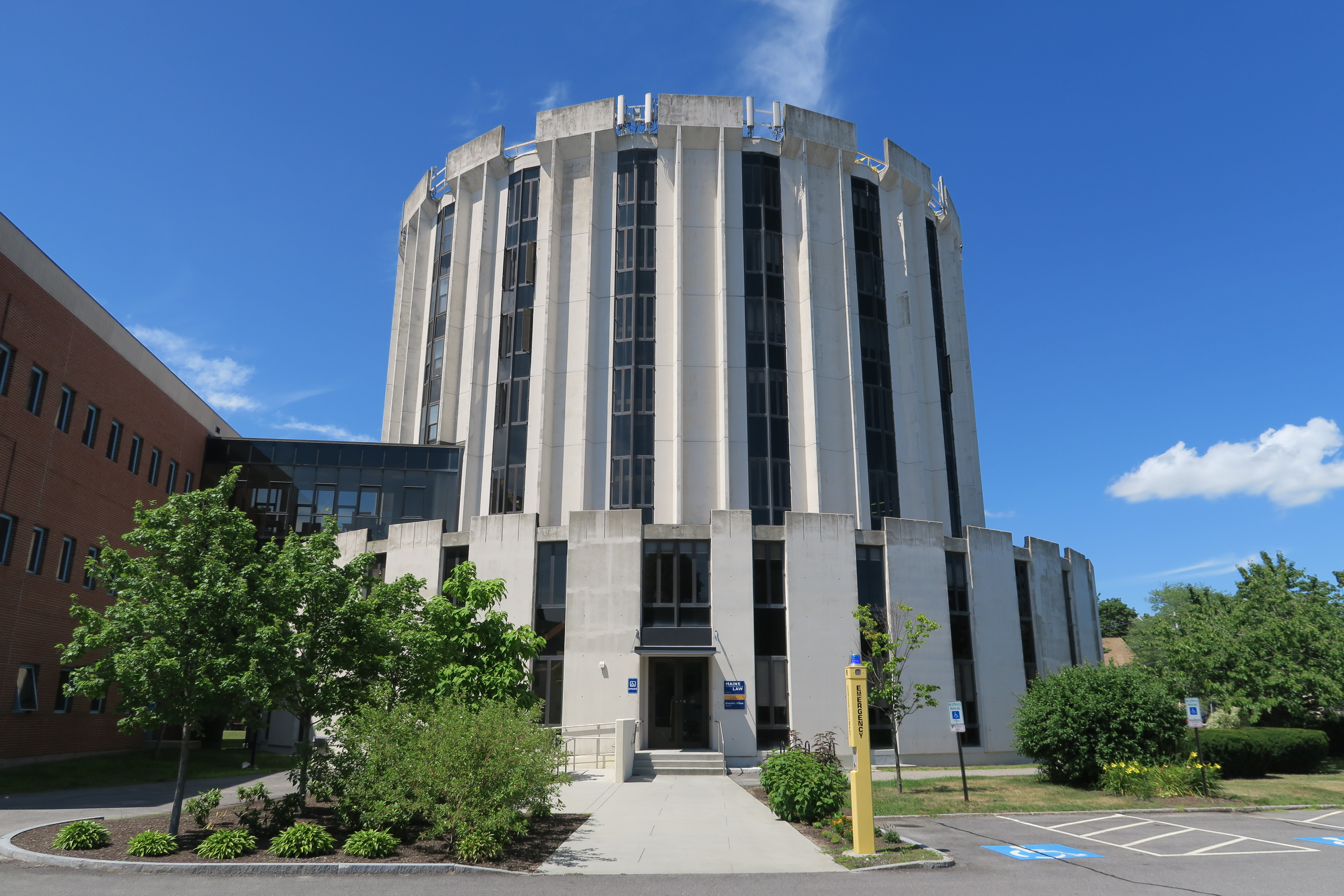
- University of Maine School of Law Building in Portland Maine circa 2016.
- Interactive map of the University of Maine School of Law Building area

General information
- Architectural style: Brutalist
- Location: 246 Deering Avenue, Portland, ME
- Completed: 1972
- Owner: University of Maine School of Law

Technical details
- Floor count: 8

Design and construction
- Architects: Wadsworth, Boston, Dimick, Mercer and Weatherill

The University of Maine School of Law Building is a former academic building in Portland, Maine. Adjacent to the University of Southern Maine's Portland campus, the 8 story building was designed by the local architectural firm of Wadsworth, Boston, Dimick, Mercer and Weatherill and completed in 1972 at a cost of $2.7 million. It expanded in 1993 to include more space on the first floor to accommodate the law library. It is a rare example of Brutalist architecture in Maine. It was built to house the University of Maine School of Law, which had previously been located downtown at 68 High Street.

In 2017, Architectural Digest named the building one of the 8 ugliest in the United States and called it "a futuristic version of the Roman Colosseum." University employees described the building's architecture and design as "a joke but also a badge" and "rather unfortunate."

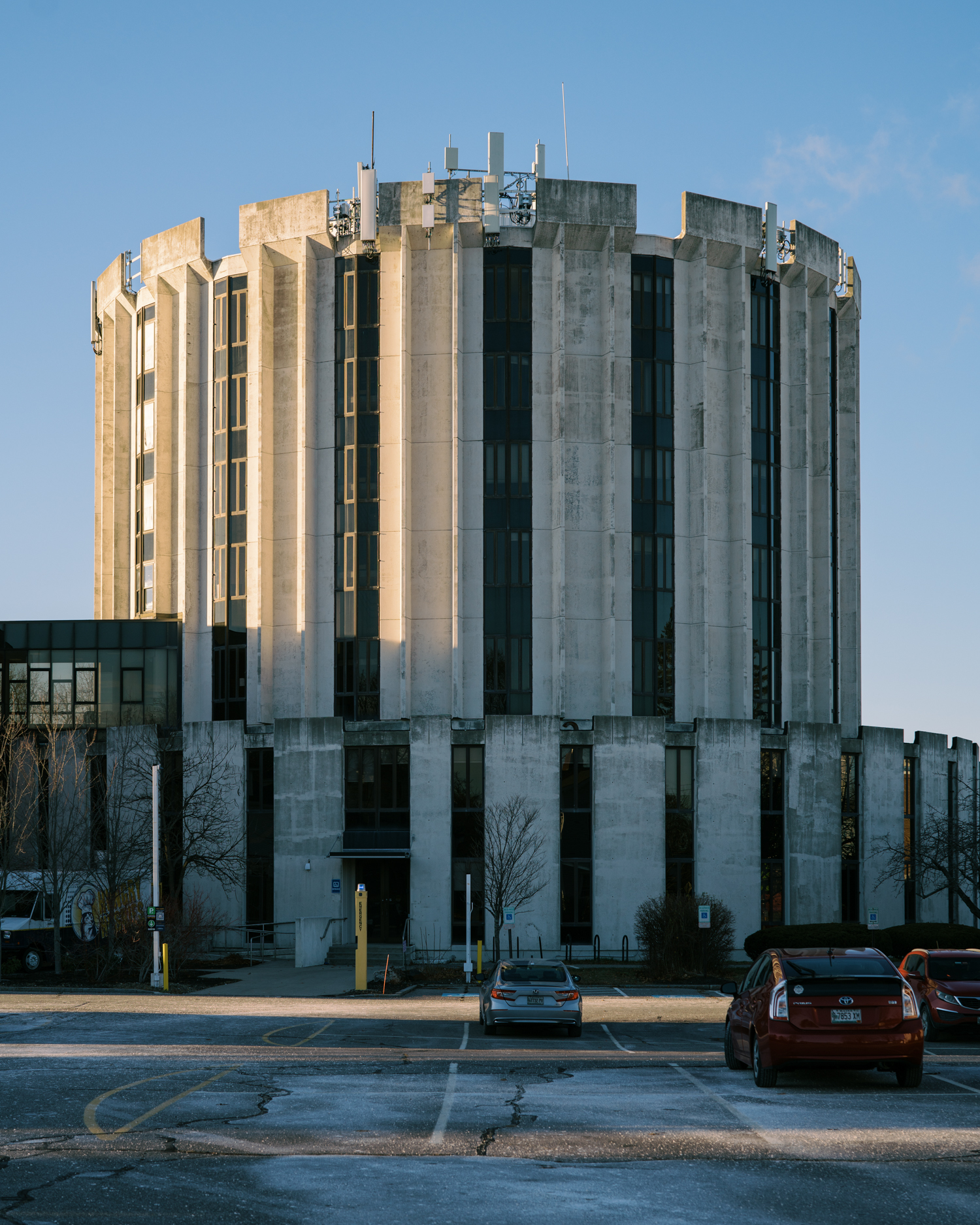
Photograph of the USM School of Law Building, December 2024

In 2023, the Maine School of Law was relocated downtown to a former office building at 300 Fore Street. After 50 years, building no longer houses a law school. The University of Maine anticipates that the vacant law school will eventually be demolished, but there are no final plans to take the building down yet.
