= Justice Dana =

Justice Dana may refer to:

- Francis Dana (1743–1811), chief justice of the Massachusetts Supreme Judicial Court
- Howard H. Dana Jr. (born 1940), associate justice of the Maine Supreme Judicial Court
