= John Day Dam =

Dam in the northwestern United States

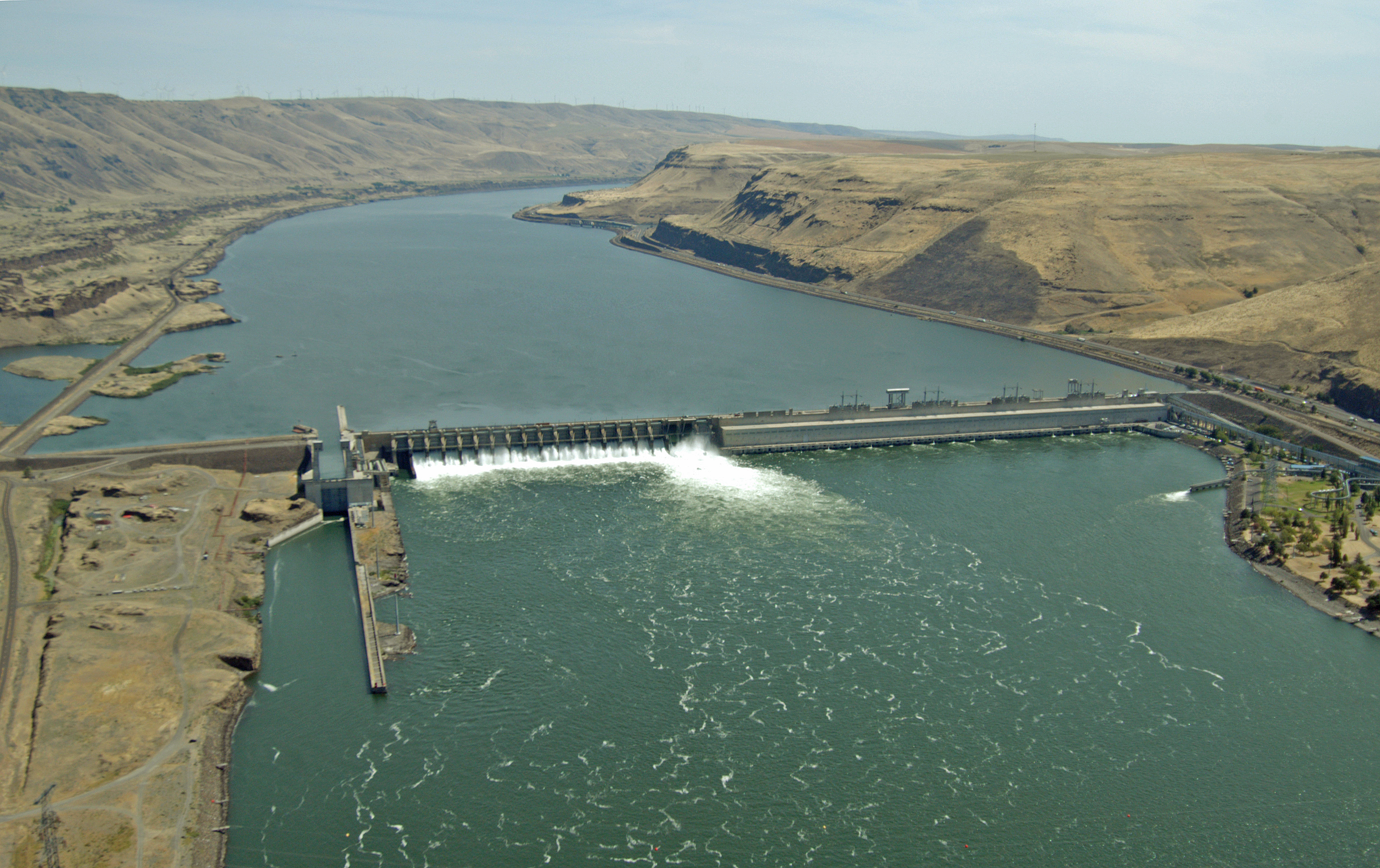
- The dam in 2013

- Location of the dam in the USA
- Interactive map of John Day Dam
- Country: United States
- Location: Sherman County, Oregon / Klickitat County, Washington
- Coordinates: 45°42′59″N 120°41′40″W
- Purpose: Power
- Status: Operational
- Construction began: 1958
- Opening date: 1971
- Construction cost: US$511 million
- Built by: U.S. Army Corps of Engineers
- Operator: U.S. Army Corps of Engineers

Dam and spillways
- Type of dam: Gravity dam
- Impounds: Columbia River
- Height: 183 ft (56 m)
- Length: 7,365 ft (2,245 m)
- Elevation at crest: 570 ft (170 m) AMSL
- Spillways: 20
- Spillway type: Service, gate-controlled
- Spillway length: 1,228 ft (374 m)

Reservoir
- Creates: Lake Umatilla
- Total capacity: 2,530,000 acre⋅ft (3.12×10^{6} ML)
- Maximum length: 76 mi (122 km)
- Maximum water depth: 268 ft (82 m)

Power Station
- Operator: U.S. Army Corps of Engineers
- Type: Run-of-the-river
- Turbines: 16 × 140 MW (190,000 hp) (20 maximum)
- Installed capacity: 2,240 MW (3,000,000 hp) (2,700 MW (3,600,000 hp) maximum)
- 2009 generation: 8,418 GWh (30,300 TJ)

The John Day Dam is a concrete gravity dam spanning the Columbia River in the northwestern United States. The dam features a navigation lock plus fish ladders on both sides. The John Day Lock has the highest lift (at 110 feet or 34 meters) of any U.S. lock. The reservoir impounded by the dam is Lake Umatilla, and it runs 76.4 miles (123.0 km) up the river channel to the foot of the McNary Dam. The John Day Dam is part of the Columbia River Basin system of dams and was established for the purpose of generating hydroelectricity via the run-of-the-river power station.

== Location ==
The John Day Dam is located 28 miles (45 km) east of the city of The Dalles, Oregon, and just below the mouth of the John Day River. The closest town on the Washington side is Goldendale, 20 miles (32 km) north. The closest town on the Oregon side is Rufus. The dam's crest elevation is approximately 570 feet (170 m) above sea level. It joins Sherman County, Oregon with Klickitat County, Washington, 216 miles (348 km) upriver from the mouth of the Columbia near Astoria, Oregon.

== History ==
Construction of the dam began in 1958 and was completed in 1971, making it the newest dam on the lower Columbia, at a total cost of US$511 million. The pool was filled in 1968 and a dedication ceremony was held on September 28, 1968. The first vessel through the new lock was the Coast Guard buoy tender USCGC Blueberry. The John Day Dam was built by and is operated by the U.S. Army Corps of Engineers. The condemnation of land upstream of the dam led to the Supreme Court case United States v. Rands, a well-known case regarding the constitutional doctrine of navigable servitude.

The dam's power generation overload capacity is 2,485 megawatts (3,332,000 hp). Skeleton units for eventual installation of four additional generators were fitted to the powerhouse during construction, allowing for a 20% increase in output should the decision be taken to complete them. The dam underwent a major repair to the upper lock gate in 2010, as documented in an episode of the National Geographic Channel program World's Toughest Fixes.

As of 2007, the 76-mile-long (122 km) reservoir formed the deadliest stretch of the Columbia River for migrating young salmon. The reservoir is the longest lake on the Columbia that young salmon must swim on their way to the ocean.

The single-lift navigation lock is 86 feet (26 m) wide and 675 feet (206 m) long.

== Gallery ==
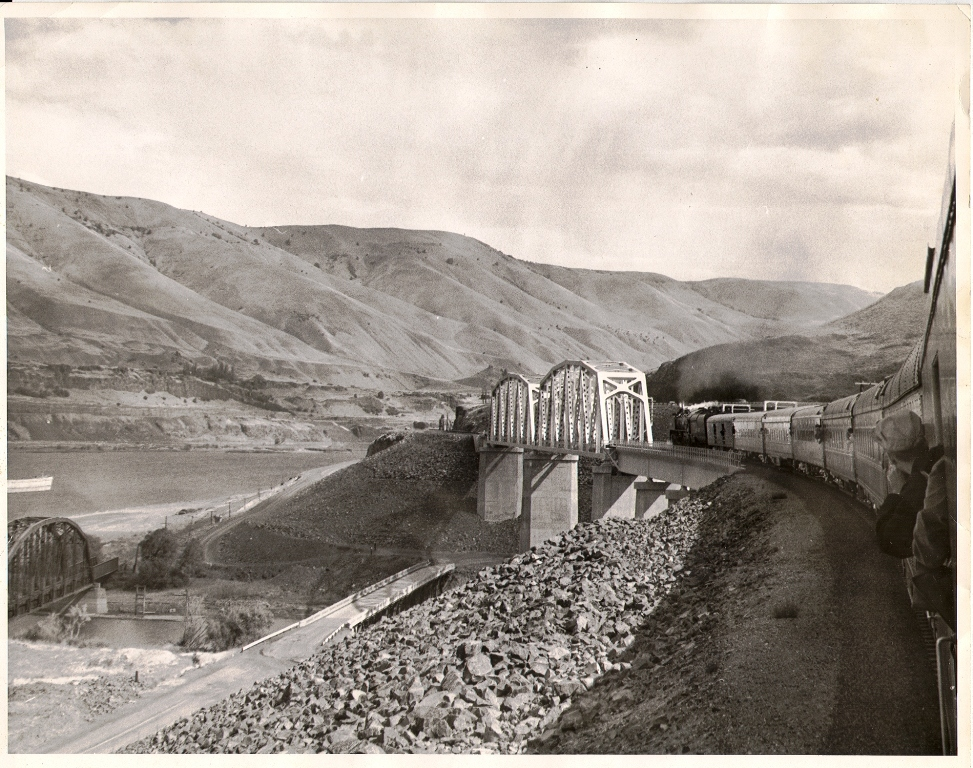
Depth of John Day Dam pool showing the new UPRR bridge, with old bridges at sites to be submerged below, 1967

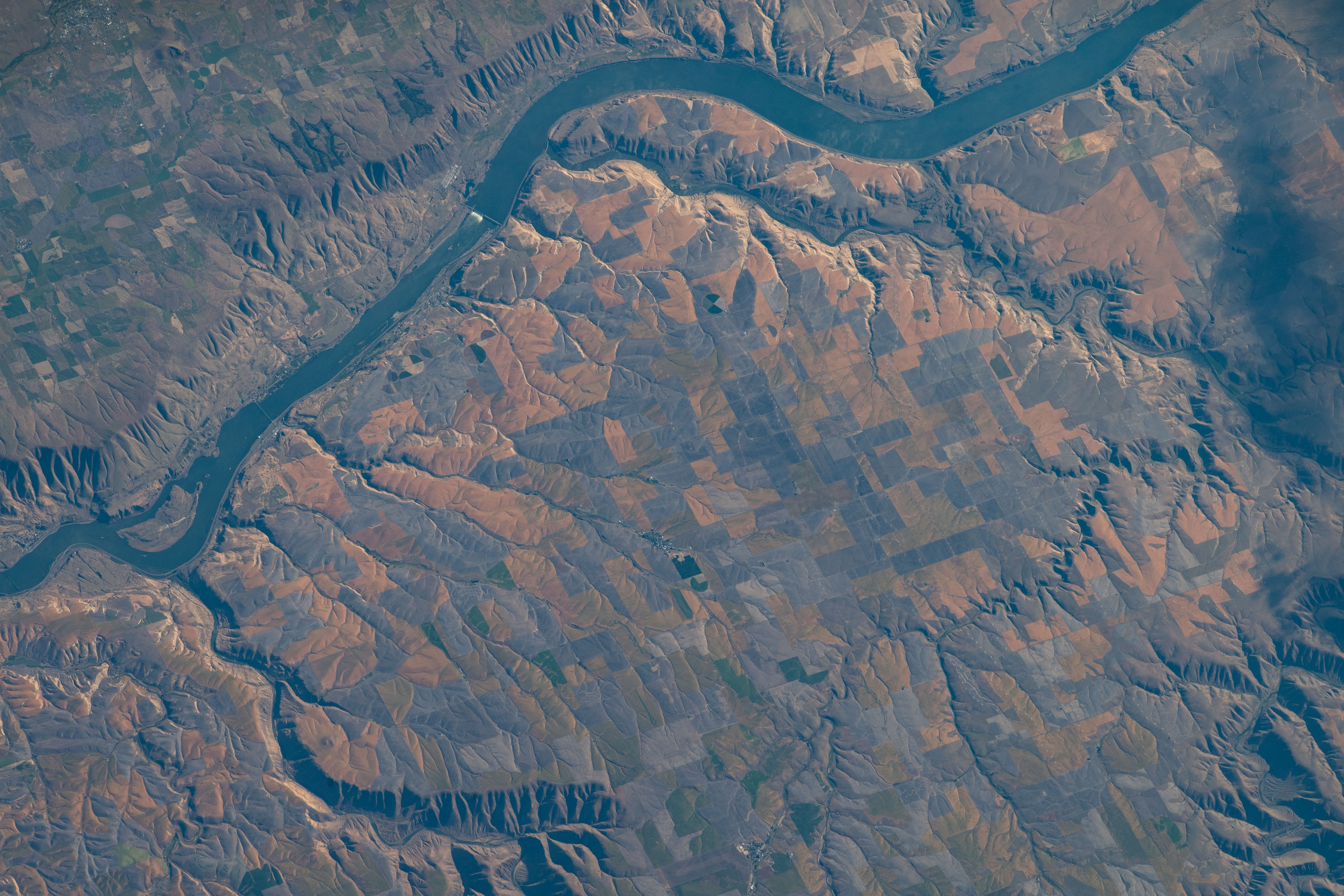
The dam and vicinity, taken from the International Space Station in 2022

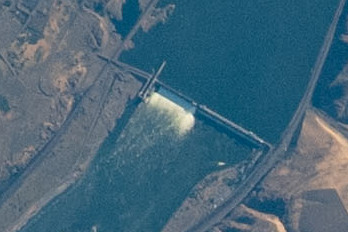
Cropped view of the dam in 2022

== See also ==
- Hydroelectric dams on the Columbia River
- List of power stations in the United States
- List of hydroelectric power stations
- List of dams in the Columbia River watershed
- List of largest hydroelectric power stations in the United States
- Blalock, Oregon

== Sources ==
- "John Day Dam (Oregon - 164 ft. elev.)". Geographic Names Information System. United States Geological Survey.
- "John Day Dam (Washington - 269 ft. elev.)". Geographic Names Information System. United States Geological Survey.
