= Valerie Stanfill =

American judge (born 1957 or 1958)

Chief Justice of the Maine Supreme Judicial Court
- Incumbent
- Assumed office June 8, 2021
- Appointed by: Janet Mills
- Preceded by: Andrew Mead (acting)

Personal details
- Born: 1957 or 1958 (age 67–68) Huntington, New York, U.S.
- Education: Bryn Mawr College (BA); University of Maine, Portland (JD)

Valerie Stanfill (born 1957 or 1958) is an American judge who serves as the chief justice of the Maine Supreme Judicial Court. She is a former associate justice of the Maine Superior Court.

== Early life and education ==
Stanfill was born in Huntington, New York. She received her Bachelor of Arts from Bryn Mawr College in 1979 and her Juris Doctor from the University of Maine School of Law in 1985.

== Career ==
Prior to becoming a judge, Stanfill worked as acting director of the Cumberland Legal Aid Clinic and as a visiting professor of law for the University of Maine School of Law.

Stanfill was first nominated to the district court by Governor John Baldacci and she was renominated by Governor Paul LePage on February 7, 2014, and sworn in on March 19, 2014. She served as a judge of the Maine District Court from January 2007 to February 2020. On December 3, 2019, she was nominated to the Maine Superior Court by Governor Janet Mills and has served on that court since February 2020. On May 10, 2021, Governor Mills nominated Stanfill to be the chief justice of the Maine Supreme Judicial Court to fill the vacancy left by the retirement of Chief Justice Leigh Saufley. If confirmed, she would be the second woman to serve as chief justice. On June 1, 2021, her nomination was unanimously voted out of committee. On June 3, 2021, the committee endorsement was upheld by the full Senate, thereby confirming Stanfill, by a vote of 34-0. She was sworn in on June 8, 2021.

Political offices
Preceded by Andrew Mead; Acting	Chief Justice of the Maine Supreme Judicial Court; 2021–present	Incumbent
