= Alice N. Persons =

American poet (born 1952)

Alice Persons (born April 23, 1952) is an American poet. She was born in Waltham, Massachusetts, grew up on Army bases, and graduated from high school in Arlington, Virginia. She earned a B.A. and an M.A. in English from the University of Oregon. In 1983, she moved to Portland, Maine to attend law school and earned a J.D. from the University of Maine School of Law.

== Career ==
After receiving her master's degree, she taught English at high school for two years. Persons then began writing poetry and publishing in small literary journals in the early 1980s. During and after law school, she took a long hiatus from writing and worked for a legal book publisher; she also worked as a part-time instructor of business law at the University of Southern Maine in Portland from 1984 to 2019.

Her first poetry chapbook was Be Careful What You Wish For, published in 2003. The second, Never Say Never, came out in 2004. In 2007 her third chapbook was published, Don't Be A Stranger. In 2011 she published Thank Your Lucky Stars.

She has received a Pushcart Prize nomination. Eight of her poems have been featured on The Writer's Almanac on National Public Radio. She has published poems in various anthologies and online journals.

In 2003, she co-founded Moon Pie Press, a small poetry press, with Nancy A. Henry. Since 2006, she has continued the press alone. By 2024, the press had published 128 books of poetry from poets all over the U.S.

After leaving USM, she took up painting and now designs cover art for some of the Moon Pie Press books.

She stepped back from Moon Pie Press in early 2024 due to ill health.

== Personal life ==
She currently lives in Westbrook, Maine, with 3 cats and a dog, and volunteers for animal welfare organizations. She also volunteers for Port Veritas, a performance organization based in Portland, Maine.
