= 68 High Street =

- Children's Hospital
- U.S. National Register of Historic Places
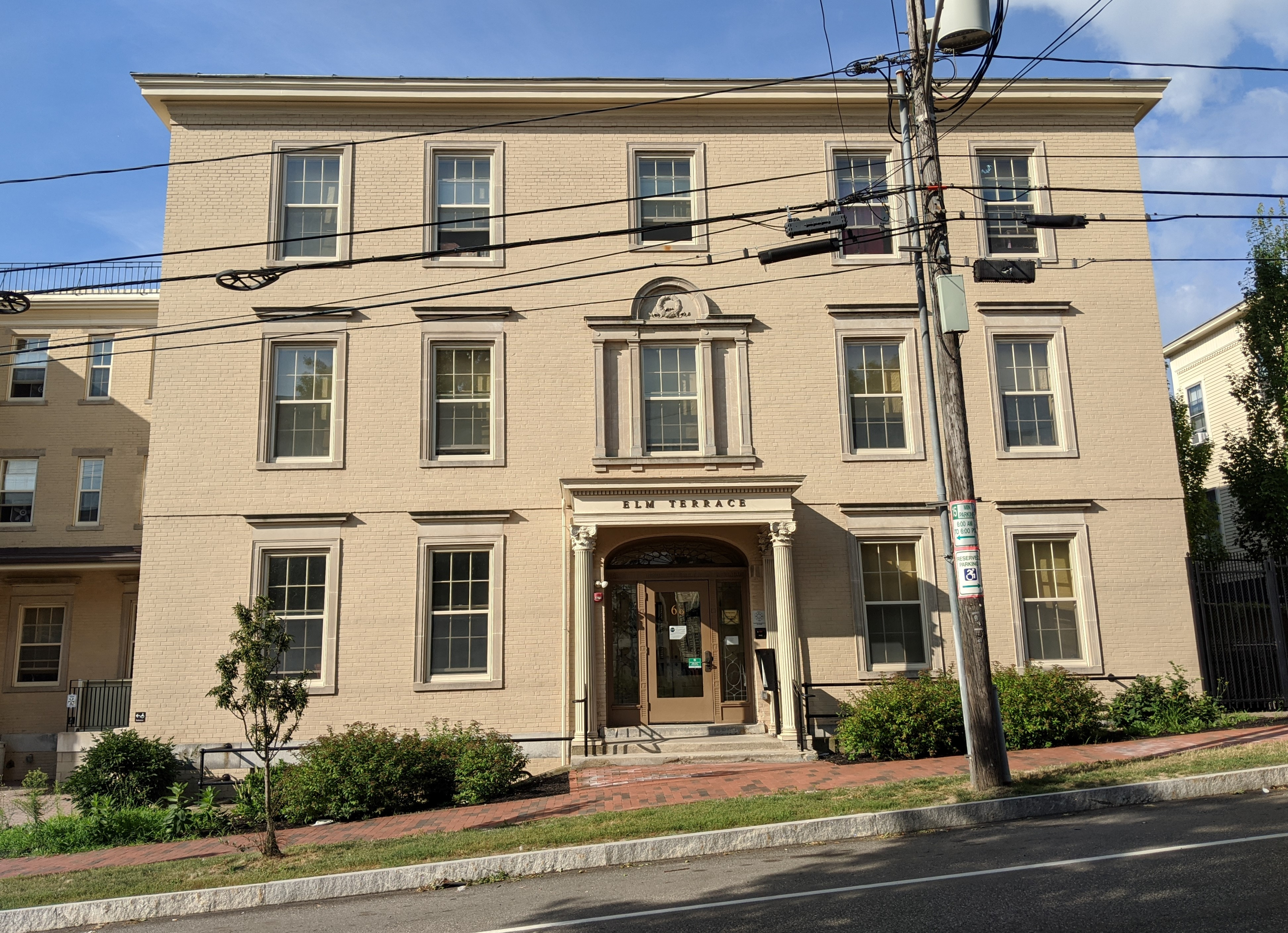
- Location: 68 High Street; Portland, Maine
- Coordinates: 43°39′8″N 70°15′38″W
- Built: 1909
- Architect: Frederick A. Tompson
- Architectural style: Colonial Revival
- NRHP reference No.: 12000065
- Added to NRHP: March 7, 2012

68 High Street, formerly the Children's Hospital, is an historic colonial revival building in Portland, Maine, United States. Located on the eastern edge of Portland's West End, the building was built in 1909 and was designed by architect Frederick A. Tompson. According to news archives, medical doctors Edville Gerhardt Abbott and Harold A. Pingree and Frank W. Lamb founded a children's hospital for disabled children with scoliosis together in 1908. It closed in 1948, with most of the 56 patients at the time being transferred to Maine General Hospital, which was later renamed the Maine Medical Center. It also served as an annex to the Mussey Mansion until the left part of that building was demolished in 1961. It was also owned by the University of Maine system. It housed the University of Maine School of Law from 1962 until 1972, after which was used by the University of Southern Maine as administrative offices.

In 2010, Community Housing of Maine sought to develop the property and the adjacent empty lot into 35 units of affordable housing. It was listed on the National Register of Historic Places March 7, 2012.

The Portland Children's Hospital is known for both, its engineering and its commitment to the well-being of children. Edville G. Abbott, M.D., as Surgeon in Chief of the Children's Hospital, fostered the "Abbott Treatment" for adjusting bend of the spine in children experiencing scoliosis in 1911. The Abbott Treatment was viewed as the norm of care for quite some time and keeps on being referred to in clinical diaries.

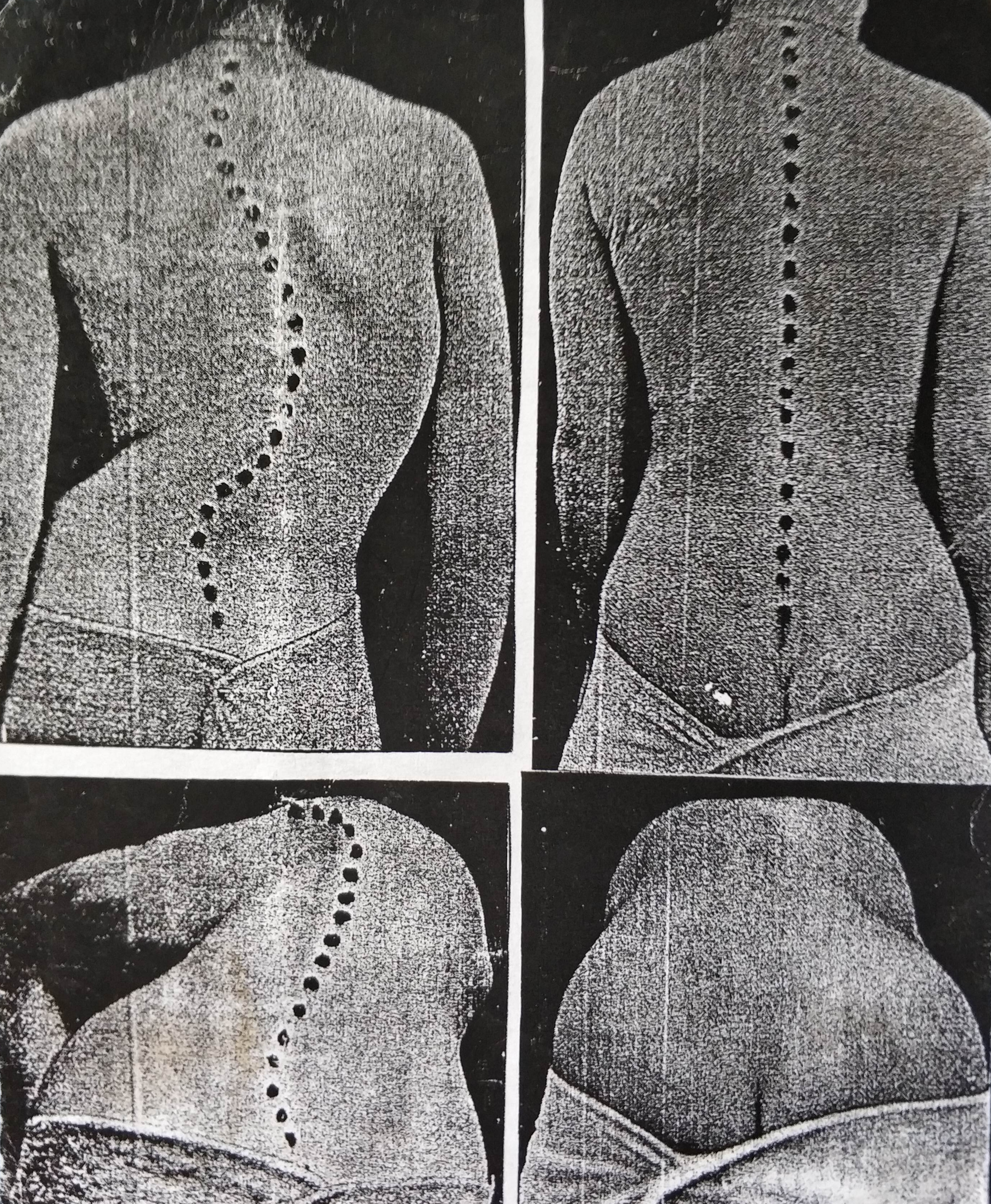
Collage of the Abbott's method results of the bloodless scoliosis treatment

== Elm Terrace ==
In 2011, the Maine State Housing Authority approved the building and the adjacent empty lot at 68 High Street for 38 low-income housing units. The building was renovated to fulfill the Americans with Disabilities Act requirements, including the addition of elevators. The first floor of 66 High Street included parking units. State treasurer Bruce Poliquin criticized the plan to redevelop the property as too expensive based on their projected per-unit cost.

== See also ==
- National Register of Historic Places listings in Portland, Maine
