= Jeremy Fischer (politician) =

American lawyer and politician

Member of the Maine House of Representatives
- In office December 4, 2002 – December 3, 2008
- Preceded by: Richard H. Duncan
- Succeeded by: Michael J. Willette
- Constituency: 145th District (2002-2004); 5th District (2004-2008)

Personal details
- Born: January 28, 1980 (age 46) Corner Brook, Newfoundland and Labrador, Canada
- Party: Democratic
- Education: University of Michigan, Ann Arbor (BA); University of Maine, Orono (JD)

Jeremy R. Fischer (born January 28, 1980) is an American lawyer and politician from Maine.

== Education ==
He graduated summa cum laude with a BA in political science from the University of Michigan and summa cum laude with a JD from the University of Maine School of Law.

== Political career ==
From 2000 to 2001 he interned in the congressional offices of United States Senator Susan Collins and Congressman John Baldacci. In 2002 he was a delegate to the Maine State Democratic Convention. From 2002 to 2004 he served as Vice Chairman of the Aroostook County Democratic Party. From 2003 to 2004 he served as Director of the Minded Democrats Political Action Committee and Director of the Northern Maine Empowerment Council. He was also a member of the state's Democratic Committee.

He was elected to the Maine House of Representatives at the age of 22, representing Presque Isle, Maine for three terms from 2002-2008, including one term as chair of the Appropriations Committee, which oversees the state budget. Following the Democratic Party takeover of the Maine Legislature in November 2012, Fischer emerged as one of the contenders for the constitutional office of State Treasurer before losing to Neria Douglass.

== Legal career ==
In 2006 he was a summer associate with the Bemis & Rossignol Law Office. From 2002 to 2005 he was an account and sales executive with the Hayden & Perry Insurance Agency. From 2008 to 2013 he was an attorney for business restructuring & insolvency at Bernstein Shur. Since 2013 he has been an attorney at the Portland law firm Drummond Woodsum, where he specializes in bankruptcy, restructuring and debtor/creditor litigation.

== Post Political career ==
He later served as Director of the Portland Regional Chamber of Commerce. Fischer also serves as an adjunct professor at the University of Maine School of Law and as a TV and radio political analyst and talk show host.
