= Legal liability =

Legal obligation for any damage, enforceable by either civil law or criminal law

In law, liable means "responsible or answerable in law; legally obligated". Legal liability concerns both civil law and criminal law and can arise from various areas of law, such as contracts, torts, taxes, or fines given by government agencies. The claimant is the one who seeks to establish, or prove, liability.

== Liability in business ==
In commercial law, limited liability is a method of protection included in some business formations that shields its owners from certain types of liability and that amount a given owner will be liable for. A limited liability form separates the owner(s) from the business. The limited liability form essentially acts as a corporate veil that protects owners from liabilities of the business. This means that when a business is found liable in a case, the owners are not themselves liable; rather, the business is. Thus, only the funds or property the owner(s) have invested into the business are subject to that liability. If, for example, a limited liability business goes bankrupt, then the owner(s) will not lose unrelated assets, such as a personal residence (assuming they do not give personal guarantees). Forms of businesses that offer the limited liability protection include limited liability partnerships, limited liability companies, and corporations. Sole proprietorships and partnerships do not include limited liability.

This is the standard model for larger businesses, in which a shareholders will only lose the amount invested (in the form of stock value decreasing). For an explanation, see business entity.

There is an exception to this rule, however, which allows a claimant to litigate against the owner(s) of a limited liability business, if the owner(s) have engaged in conduct that justifies the claimant's recovery from the owner(s): This exception is called "piercing the corporate veil." Courts generally try not to utilize this exception unless there have been serious transgressions. Limited liability aids entrepreneurs, businesses, and the economy in growing and innovating. Therefore, if courts often chose to pierce the veil, that innovation would be restricted. The exact test a court will use to determine if the veil needs to pierced vary by state in the United States.

For sole proprietorships and general partnerships, the liability is unlimited. Unlimited liability means that the owner(s) of the business have the full responsibility of assuming all the business's debts. This can include seizure of personal assets in the face of bankruptcy and liquidation. Professionals in limited liability partnerships and limited liability companies will have unlimited liability for their own torts and malpractices. The limited liability of the business will no longer apply for these wrongdoings.

For business owners, there are main categories of liability exposure to be aware of in order to protect their businesses from liability and financial troubles and issues. The first is employment-related issues where the larger the work force, and the more turnover there is, the larger the likelihood of liability lawsuits such as wrongful termination claims. Another area is accidents and/or injuries on the premises. Next, vehicle-related liability if employees are allowed to drive company cars since this could lead to accidents while they use the company cars. Product-related liability (also called manufacturer's liability) details poor manufacturing of products that results in injuries and/or accidents, which is discussed in more detail in the following section. Errors/omissions is another category where a lawsuit can result from a mistake on the part of the company such as in a contract or paperwork. Finally, the last major category relates to holding directors and officers personally liable for actions taken by the company, as seen in piercing the corporate veil. Overall, as businesses get larger and more successful, their chances of liability lawsuits increase, but small businesses are not completely immune to them. Entrepreneurs and business owners need to be aware of these types of liability exposures to ensure their businesses are protected.

=== Product liability ===
Product liability governs civil lawsuits between a plaintiff and defendant who furnishes defective goods that caused loss or injury 11.

Product liability and its prevalence in the law has changed throughout history. In the 19th century, it worked to both the manufacturers' and other sellers' advantages. "Caveat emptor" ("let the buyer beware") reigned supreme in this area of the law. In this era, the seller had no liability unless they had made an express promise to the customer that was not received. The 19th century was also when the Industrial Revolution was beginning and changing the business world. In order to promote this rise in industrialization and manufacturing, the law avoided allowing damage recoveries that would weaken new industries. In the 20th and 21st centuries, there was no longer this need to protect manufacturers from liability. If anything, there was more of need to impose liability standards on industries because consumers had less power to freely bargain with corporations and other business forms. Furthermore, the complexities and intricacies of goods was increasing, making it harder for the average buyer to determine manufacturing issues when purchasing these goods. Now a new phrase dominates liability: "caveat venditor" or "let the seller beware." The law finds that sellers and manufacturers can face more liability for defects with the help of insurance and socializing the damages by raising prices and forcing the consumer to pay for it.

If a manufacturer is found to be negligent, that means they breached their duty to the customer by not eliminating a reasonably foreseeable risk caused by the product. The manufacturer can be seen as negligent if there are problems in the manufacturing process, do not properly inspect their products, do not give a reasonable warning to the customer when the product has a foreseeable risk of harm, and/or the design lends itself to risk of harm. The magnitude and severity of the foreseeable harm are also assessed when looking at negligence.

=== Employer liability ===
There is a form of liability that exists between employers and their employees. This is called vicarious liability. For it to apply, one party has responsibility for a third party, and the third party commits an unlawful action. An employer may be held liable for the actions of an employee if it is unlawful (i.e. harassment or discrimination), or the employee's negligent actions while working causes damages to property or injury.

Respondeat superior ("Let the superior answer") is a legal principle that dictates when an employer is responsible for the actions of an employee. Employers should worry about this rule when the employee commits a tort or harmful act when the employee was acting within the course and scope of employment at the time of the incident. The term "scope of employment" is when an employee is doing work assigned by their employer or is completing a task that is subject to the employer's control. To test whether the conduct that led to the incident is within the scope of employment, one must determine:

1. If it was the type of task the employee was employed to perform
2. It occurred flexibly within the authorized work time period
3. The incident was not unreasonably far away from the employer authorized location
4. The incident was motivated, at least in part, for the purpose of serving the employer

If these four factors are found to be true, the employer will have to answer for the tort. The reasoning behind this legal principle is because it is thought that the employer is best suited for bearing the financial burden, employers can protect themselves against this burden with insurance, and the cost can be passed to customers by raising prices. On the other hand, if the employee was found to have either detoured or frolicked then defining the scope of employment becomes trickier. The rule of frolic and detour changes how the liability applies. A frolic is when the employee causes a tort when completing an activity that is unrelated to their job. If it is found that the employee had frolicked, the employee would then be liable for damages. For example, if a delivery driver does not complete his deliveries for a few hours so he can do some personal shopping, and on his way to the store, he hits a pedestrian. A detour is more minor. The employee is still participating in a non-work related activity, but the activity is not a major disregard for work duties. An example of a detour would be if on the way to deliver a package, a delivery driver stops at a drive-thru to grab something to eat. When pulling away from the restaurant to continue with deliveries, the driver hits a pedestrian. Here, the employer could still be liable for these damages because the detour was minor.

An employer can also be liable for a legal principle called negligent hiring. This happens when in the process of hiring a new employee, the employer does not check criminal pasts, backgrounds, or references to ensure the applicant did not pose a potential danger if hired as an employee. Under a similar principle of negligent retention, an employer may face liability if they know that a worker poses a potential danger to others but maintains their employment. To avoid claims of negligent hiring or retention, employers should take appropriate measures to avoid hiring employees who will pose a danger to members of the public, and take appropriate measures in response to any concerns that come to their attention, up to and including dismissal. Employers who serve vulnerable populations, such as young children and the elderly, go to customers' homes, or have access to weapons may perform criminal background checks as their default practice, and may have additional legal duties when it comes to screening, supervising and disciplining employees.

It is important for employers to note whether someone working for them is an independent contractor or an employee. An employee is someone who is a paid worker for the employer. An independent contractor, on the other hand, contracts with a principal to produce a result and in the process, gets to determine how that result will be completed. The difference lies in how much control the principal/employer can wield on the agent. Employees are subjected to more control while nonemployee agents, like independent contractors, have more freedom in how they do their job. A principal is not ordinarily liable for torts committed by nonemployee agents since the principal does not fully control the method of work done. However, there are exceptions to this. There can be direct liability if the principal hired an incompetent agent, if harm resulted from nonemployee agent's failure to perform a duty of care that the principal bestowed on them (a duty of care is an action whose successful performance is so important that if it is delegated to an agent and not accomplished, the principal is still liable), and a principal is liable if the nonemployee agent did not take the correct precautions required to complete very dangerous activities.

An employer should also be aware on how the extent of their liability can change based on the agreements their agents make. An agent is a person who has the power to act on behalf of another party (typically the principal). Usually, a principal is liable for a contract made by the agent if the agent had actual or apparent authority to make the contract. Actual authority is the ability an agent has to pursue and complete certain activities based on communication and manifestations from the principal. Express authority is when the principal clearly states what the agent has the authority to do while implied authority is based on what is reasonable to assume that the agent is allowed to do based on what the principal wants of the agent. Express and implied authority are both types of actual authority. The second type of authority is apparent authority. This occurs when a principal's actions lead a third party to reasonably assume that the agent can act in a certain way and create contracts with the third party on behalf of the principal. To determine if an agent is liable for a contract, one must look at the type of principal. There are four types of principals. A disclosed principal is known to the third party, and the third party knows that the agent is acting for this principal. The agent is not liable on authorized contracts made for a disclosed principal since all parties are aware of the contract and who is participating in the contract. An unidentified principal is seen when the third party knows the agent is acting for a principal but lacks knowledge on the principal's identity. The agent is typically liable for contracts made for an unidentified principal. An undisclosed principal is seen when the third party does not know the principal's existence and identity and reasonably believes the agent is the other party in the contract. In this instance, the agent can be held liable for the contract. A nonexistent principal refers to when an agent knowingly acts for principal that does not exist, such as an unincorporated association. The agent is liable here if they knew the principal had no capacity to take part in the contract even if the third party knows that the principal does not exist. An agent can also bind themselves to contracts by expressly agreeing to be liable. To avoid this, agents should make no express promises in their own name and should make sure the contract only obligates the principal. An agent may also be liable to a third party if they lack the authority to contract for a principal. The agent may escape liability in this scenario if the third party knows the agent lacks authority, the principal ratifies/affirms the contract, or the agent notifies the third party of his lack of authority.

=== Additional concepts ===
Economists use the term "legal liability" to describe the legal-bound obligation to pay debts.

== See also ==
- Attribution (law)
- Tort
- Strict liability
