= Blalock, Oregon =

- Former community
- Location within the state of Oregon Blalock (the United States)
- Coordinates: 45°41′39″N 120°22′24″W
- Country: United States
- State: Oregon
- County: Gilliam
- Time zone: UTC-8 (Pacific)
  - Summer (DST): UTC-7 (Pacific)
- GNIS feature ID: 1164926

Blalock was an unincorporated community located in the Columbia River Gorge in Gilliam County, Oregon, United States. The town displaced a Native American settlement originally named Táwash. Blalock was located about 7 miles (11 km) west of Arlington on Interstate 84/U.S. Route 30 at the mouth of Blalock Canyon. Blalock is still the name of a station on the Union Pacific Railroad (originally the Oregon Railway and Navigation Company, or OR&N).

== History ==
The community was named for the farm of Dr. Nelson G. Blalock, a Civil War veteran who had pioneered in the Walla Walla area. He established an agricultural operation of several thousand acres on the flat land here along the Columbia River. The area was first settled in 1879, and Blalock post office was established in 1881. The town was platted in 1881 by the Blalock Wheat Growing Company. The first two buildings, a railroad station and a warehouse, were built by A. J. McLellan, OR&N superintendent of the construction of bridges and buildings. By 1884, the community was shipping wheat and there were daily stagecoaches to Heppner; the population was 50. People and businesses listed in the Polk Directory at that time included two clergymen, a saloon, a wagonmaker, a ferryman, a hotel, a general store, a lawyer, and a dealer in lumber, coal, and feed. In 1904, the town handled about 750,000 bushels of wheat. By 1905, the town had two grain warehouses, a hotel, a general store, a livery and stage stable, a real estate office and an agricultural implement factory. In 1940, Blalock had a population of 19. The post office closed in 1959. In 1968, the community was inundated by the backwaters from the John Day Dam.

== See also ==
- List of ghost towns in Oregon
