= Daniel Wathen =

American judge (born 1939)

Chief Justice of the Maine Supreme Judicial Court
- In office March 20, 1992 – October 4, 2001
- Appointed by: John R. McKernan Jr.
- Preceded by: Vincent L. McKusick
- Succeeded by: Leigh I. Saufley

Associate Justice of the Maine Supreme Judicial Court
- In office August 31, 1981 – March 20, 1992
- Appointed by: Joseph E. Brennan

Justice of the Maine Superior Court
- In office September 16, 1977 – August 31, 1981
- Appointed by: James B. Longley

Personal details
- Born: Daniel Everett Wathen; November 4, 1939 (age 86) Easton, Maine, U.S.
- Party: Republican
- Spouse: Judith C. Foren
- Education: Ricker College (AB); University of Maine (JD); University of Virginia (LLM)

Daniel Everett "Dan" Wathen (born November 4, 1939, in Easton, Maine) is an American lawyer and politician from Maine. He was Chief Justice of the Maine Supreme Judicial Court from March 1992 until October 2001, when he resigned to run for Governor of Maine as a Republican. He was replaced as chief justice by Leigh Saufley.

At the time of his gubernatorial campaign announcement, many pollsters and academics did not believe Wathen would factor into the 2002 gubernatorial election. He ultimately dropped out of the race the next month.

Wathen is a native of Easton in Aroostook County, Maine. He graduated from Ricker College in Houlton and earned his Juris Doctor degree from the University of Maine School of Law. He also holds a Master of Laws degree from the University of Virginia School of Law.

As of 2010, Wathen oversaw court-ordered improvements in mental health services. Wathen testified before the Health and Human Services committee of the Maine legislature that cuts to mental health services would be "illusory" and the proposed cuts would be spent elsewhere, such as in prison services for mentally ill people. Attorney General Janet Mills defended Governor John Baldacci's plan to cut mental health services.

As of 2011, Wathen was the board chairman of the Maine Turnpike Authority.

Since 2002, he has served as Of Counsel for Pierce Atwood LLP, a law firm which has an office based in Augusta, Maine.

In April 2013, Governor Paul R. LePage nominated him to serve as co-chair of the Maine Unemployment Investigation Commission.

Following a mass shooting in Lewiston, Maine, in 2023, committed by a mentally disturbed Army reservist, Governor Janet Mills appointed Wathen to chair a seven-member independent commission to investigate the tragedy. The commission concluded that both police and the Army Reserve missed opportunities to prevent the shooting.

== See also ==
- Swanson v. Roman Catholic Bishop – majority opinion written by Wathen
