= USCGC Blueberry =

Inland buoy tender of the United States Coast Guard

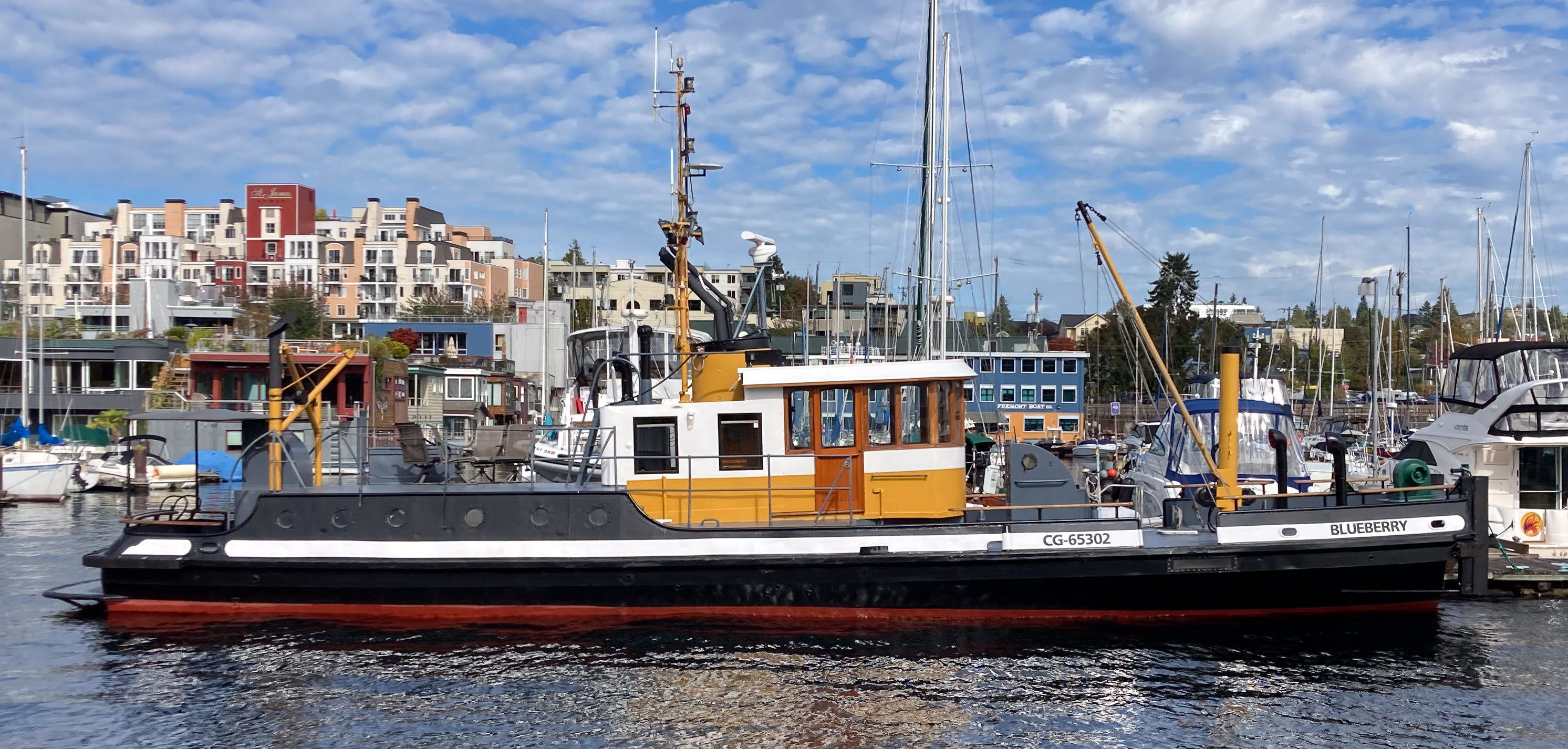
- Blueberry in 2025

History

United States Coast Guard
- Name: CG 521, 1941; CG 65302-D, 1945; USCGC Blueberry, 1964
- Launched: 22 November 1941
- Identification: Callsign: NLAX
- Fate: Sold 1976

United States
- Name: Blueberry
- Owner: Kenneth L. Michaelson, 1976; Peter P. Whittier, 1979; Herb Myers, 1990; Mark Freeman, 1994
- Identification: Official number: 572495; Callsign: WCE5218

General characteristics as built in 1941
- Displacement: 68 tons
- Length: 65 ft (20 m)
- Beam: 14 ft 5 in (4.39 m)
- Draft: 4 ft (1.2 m)
- Propulsion: 2 × Gray Marine diesel engines
- Speed: 12 knots (22 km/h; 14 mph)
- Complement: 6 enlisted

USCGC Blueberry (WLI-65302) was an inland buoy tender of the United States Coast Guard which was launched in 1941. She was the first Coast Guard vessel responsible for maintaining aids to navigation on the upper Columbia River, and the Snake River. She was sold by the Coast Guard in 1976.

Blueberry was converted into a yacht, but retained her basic configuration, including her deck crane and the square bow which enabled her to push a barge up her rivers. In 1994 she was purchased by the owner of the Fremont Tugboat Company and is now used once again as a tug in the waterways around Seattle.

== Design and characteristics ==
As the economy of the United States' inland northwest grew in the late 1930s, river traffic on the upper Columbia and Snake Rivers grew. In April 1940, 52,923 tons of cargo passed Bonneville Dam. Much of the upriver traffic was petroleum products, while the cargo coming from the interior was primarily agricultural and forest products. What buoys existed on the rivers above Celilo Falls were maintained by the towing companies that used the waterways. Buoys were often empty gasoline drums anchored in the stream. CG 521 was the first Coast Guard buoy tender assigned to the upper Columbia and Snake Rivers to regularize aids to navigation.

Birchfield Boiler Company of Tacoma, Washington was the low bidder for the new inland buoy tender in January 1941. The ship was launched on 22 November 1941. She was christened by Charles H. Roach, the 14-year old son of Coast Guard Captain Henry C. Roach. The new ship underwent sea trials in Puget Sound in December 1941. She was delivered to the Coast Guard on 8 January 1942. She was reported to have cost more than $65,000.

The ship's hull was constructed of steel plates. She was 65 feet (20 m) long overall, with a beam of 14 feet 5 inches (4.39 m), and a draft of 4 feet (1.2 m). She displaced 68 tons.

As originally constructed, she was propelled by two 165-horsepower (123 kW) Gray Marine diesel engines. These engines were replaced by two Detroit Diesel 6-71 engines, each of which produces 200 horsepower (150 kW). These drive two 3-bladed bronze propellers which are 30 inches (0.76 m) in diameter. Her fuel tanks have capacity for 800 US gallons (3,000 L) which gives her an unrefueled range of 1,000 miles (1,600 km) at 10 knots (19 km/h; 12 mph). Her maximum sustained speed in 12 knots (22 km/h; 14 mph).

Her bow was squared-off and equipped with fenders so that she could push a barge containing buoys and their anchors, batteries, and other equipment for her aids to navigation work. Her deck crane could lift 2,000 pounds (910 kg).

The ship's complement in 1942 was six enlisted personnel, led by a chief boatswain's mate. Crew accommodations aboard were minimal. There was a small galley which had no stove. There was no hot water for bathing or shaving. There were six berths in the crew quarters.

At the time of her launch, small Coast Guard vessels were not given names. She was referred to as CG 521. By 1945, she was renumbered CG 65302-D. In 1964 she was named Blueberry, and designated an inland buoy tender, WLI, with the pennant number 65302.

== Coast Guard service (1942–1976) ==
After commissioning, CG 521 was assigned to the Dalles, Oregon, where the port commission had accommodations for her six crew. The ship placed new buoys, repositioned buoys which were off-station, repaired damaged buoys, and built new lights on the rivers' banks. Her crew replaced batteries and lightbulbs. She removed deadheads, floating logs, from her rivers.

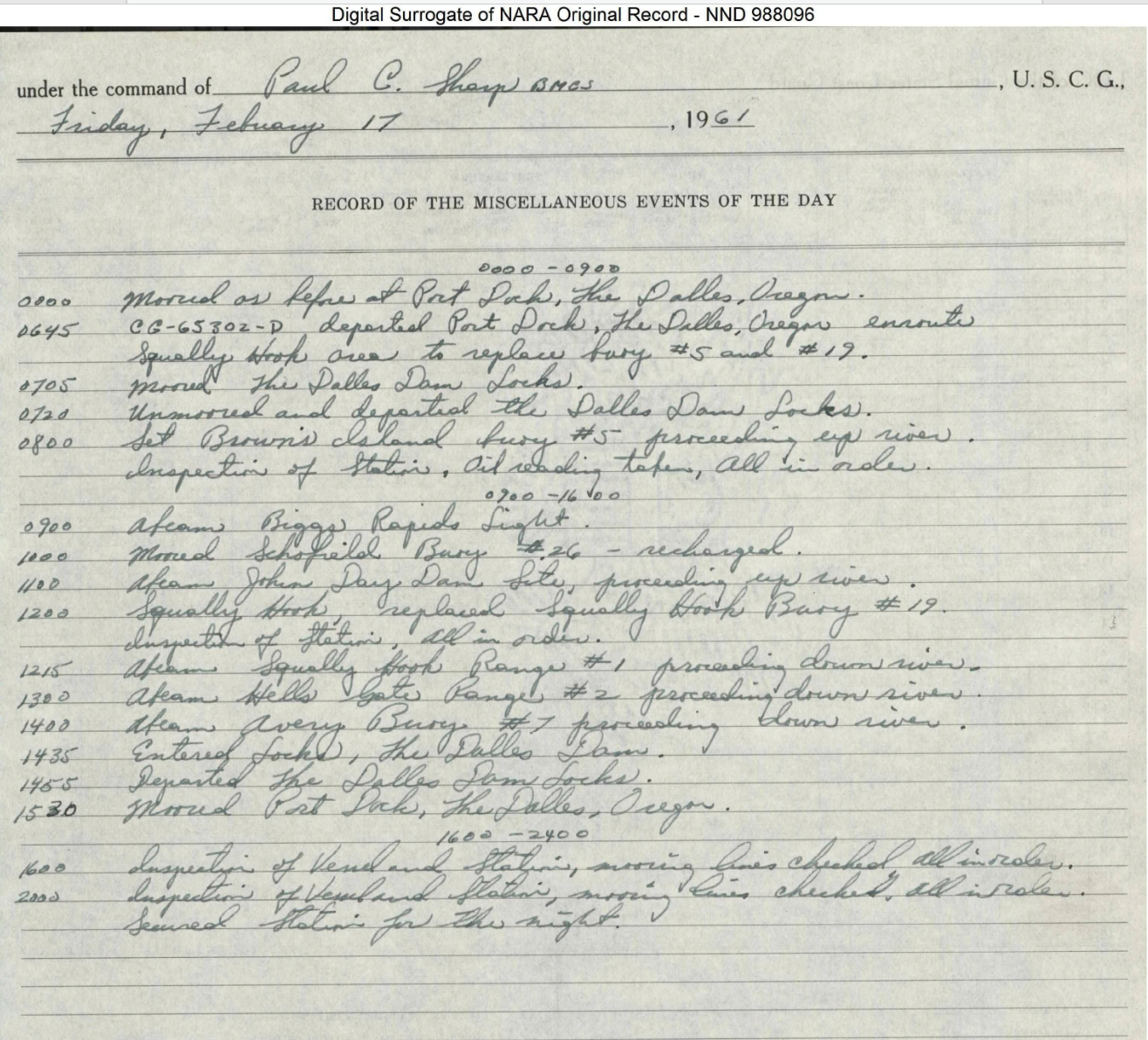
Ship's log of CG 65302-D from 17 February 1961

When CG 521 began her work in 1942 there were no dams on the Snake River to the head of navigation at Lewiston, Idaho, and only the Bonneville Dam with its associated locks on the shipping lanes of the Columbia. Much of these two rivers was free-flowing, with difficult rapids, shoals, and high currents. Navigation was difficult, so the buoys and lights CG 521 established and maintained were important to the barge traffic that traveled the rivers.

Over the course of her 34-year service, three dams and associated locks were built on the Columbia: the Dalles Dam, the McNary Dam, and the John Day Dam. Four dams and locks were built on the Snake River between the Columbia and Lewiston; the Lower Granite Dam, the Little Goose Dam, the Lower Monumental Dam, the Ice Harbor dam. The construction of the dams required multiple changes in the shipping lanes on the rivers, and these involved the buoy tender. For example, as the construction on the John Day Dam advanced, CG 65302-D updated the buoys through the dam site. When the navigation lock became operational, she was the first vessel through. The dam created a pool 77 miles (124 km) long up the Columbia when it was completed in 1968. The water level behind the dam rose by as much as 100 feet (30 m), flooding a number of difficult rapids and eliminating swift currents. The 144 lights along the channel were reduced to 56. Blueberry removed the obsolete buoys from the river.

In February 1949, CG 65302-D struck a shoal at Scofield Rapids 15 miles (24 km) east of Celilo. She was heavily laden with buoys and anchors at the time. Her forward hold began to flood, and a temporary patch had to be made before she could be pulled off the reef.

In October 1962 the Coast Guard station at the Dalles, including CG 65302-D was moved to the newly-constructed Light Attendant Station on Clover Island at Kennewick, Washington.

The Coast Guard took bids for Blueberry, which was moored at the time at Kennewick, on 28 January 1976.

== Private ownership (1976–present) ==
Blueberry was sold to Kenneth L. Michaelson, who changed her homeport to Juneau, Alaska. Peter Whittier bought her in 1979 and spent roughly ten years converting Blueberry into a yacht. He gutted the interior and replaced much of the wheelhouse. Herb Myers bought Blueberry in 1990 and also used her as a yacht.

Mark Freeman bought her in 1994. He owned the Fremont Tugboat Company, Inc., which specialized in small towing and ship-assist jobs in Lake Washington and Lake Union. Freeman used Blueberry both as a cruising yacht and as a tugboat. She remains part of the Fremont Tugboat fleet in 2025.
