= Edville Gerhardt Abbott =

American orthopaedic surgeon, orthotist and inventor (1871-1938)

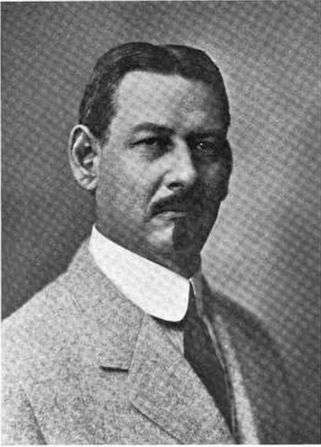
- Head shot of Edville Gerhardt Abbott taken in 1921.
- Born: November 6, 1871; Hancock, Maine, U.S.
- Died: August 27, 1938 (aged 66); Portland, Maine, U.S.
- Occupation: orthopedic surgeon
- Known for: Treatment of scoliosis, creating the first modern scoliosis brace, and co-founding a famous children's hospital for children with scoliosis

Edville Gerhardt Abbott (November 6, 1871 – August 27, 1938) was an American orthopedic surgeon, orthotist and inventor.

Abbott was recognized for pioneering a new treatment of lateral curvature of the spine (scoliosis), creating the first modern scoliosis brace and for co-founding a famous children's hospital for children with scoliosis in Portland, Maine.

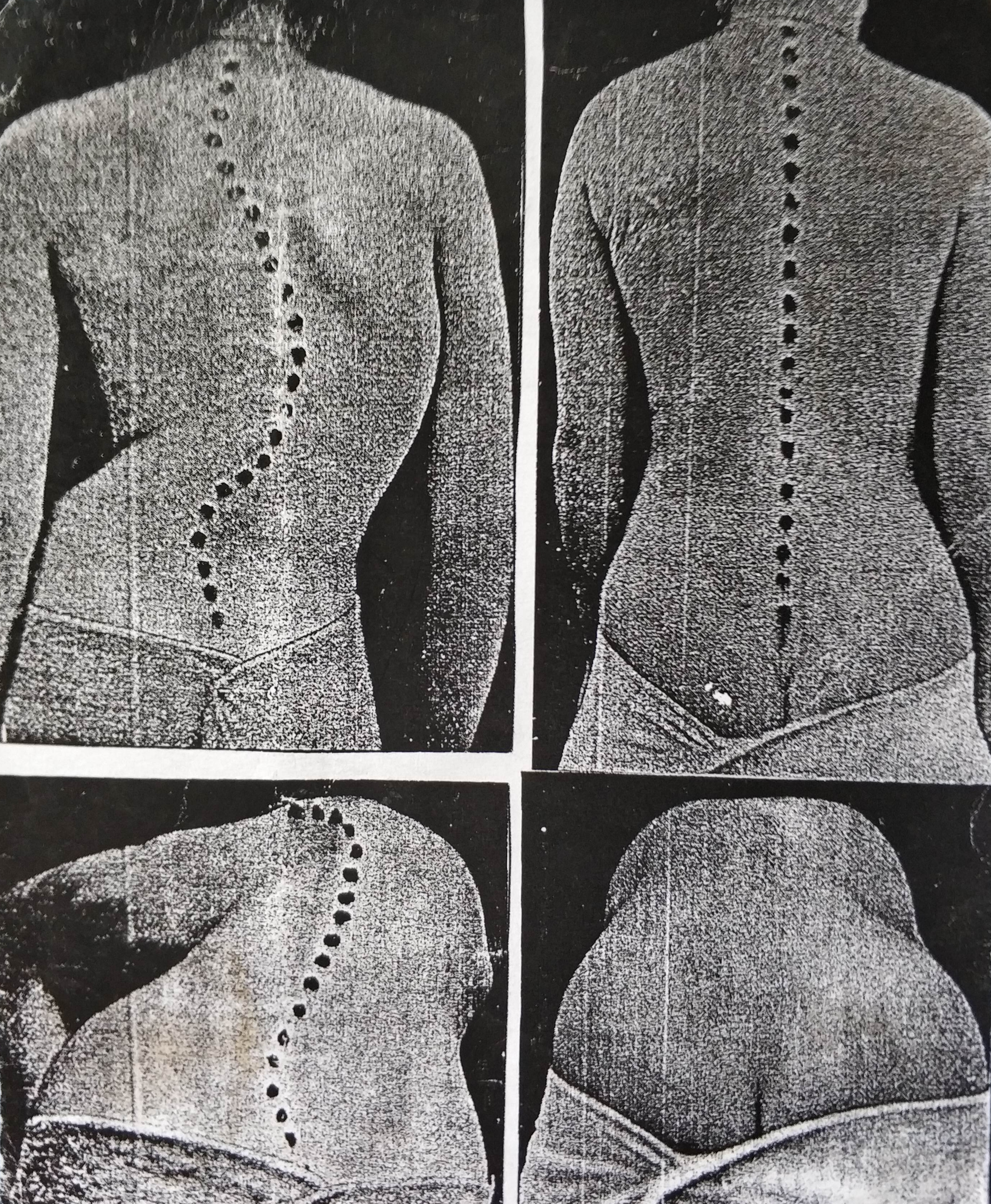
Collage of the Abbott's method results of the bloodless scoliosis treatment

== Early life ==
Abbott was born in Hancock, Maine, on November 6, 1871, the second child of Alonzo and Maria B. (Mercer) Abbott. He attended the public schools of Hancock and then went to the East Maine Conference Seminary in Bucksport, Maine, where he graduated in 1889. For the next six years, Abbott worked with his father and brother in the granite business, supervising their quarries on Mt. Desert Island.

== Medical career ==
In 1895, Abbott entered medical school at Bowdoin College, from which he graduated in 1898. He was then appointed house physician at the Maine General Hospital, where he served one year. In 1899, Abbott spent time in Boston and New York City studying orthopedic surgery. He then spent a year studying at the Friedrich-Wilhelms-Universität in Berlin, Germany.

Returning to the U. S. in 1901, Abbott opened an office in Portland, Maine to practice orthopedic surgery. During this period, he re-entered Bowdoin College to obtain a Bachelor of Arts. Concentrating on literature, Abbott received a MA degree two years later. In 1908, Abbott co-founded with Harold A. Pingree and Frank W. Lamb the worldwide famous children's hospital for crippled children.

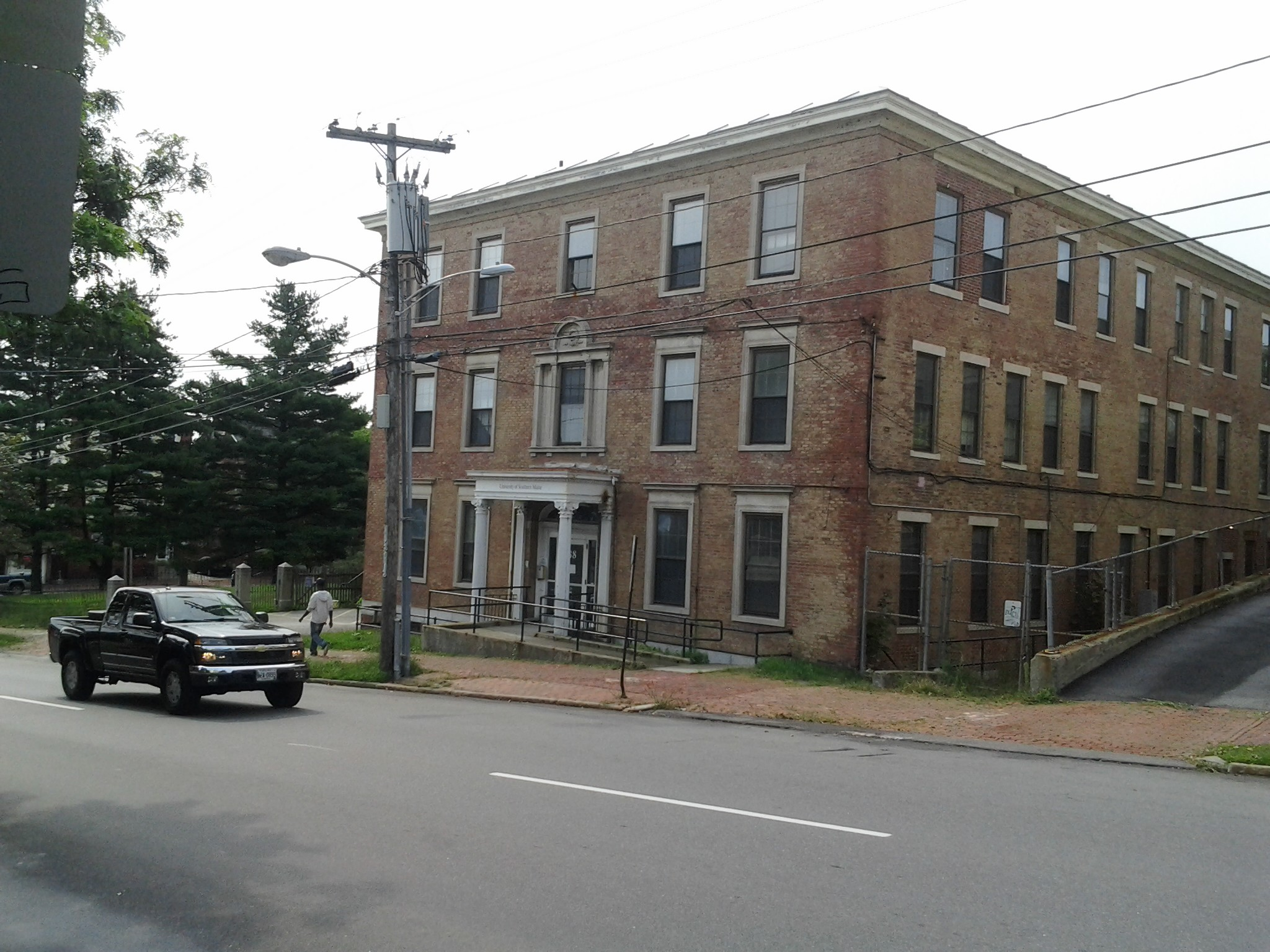
Part of the former children's hospital

Abbott pioneered a non-surgical treatment of lateral curvature of the spine (scoliosis). In 1913, he successfully demonstrated results of his method at an orthopedic congress in Berlin, Germany and England and elsewhere in Europe. He was named a "Genius of Orthopaedics" by international colleagues.

In 1917, Abbott created the first effective modern plastic scoliosis brace from celluloid.

During his career, Abbott was surgeon-in-chief at the Children's Hospital in Portland, orthopedic surgeon to the Maine General Hospital; visiting surgeon to St. Barnabas Hospital in Portland; consulting surgeon to the Sisters' Hospital in Waterville, Maine and instructor in orthopedic surgery in the Maine Medical School. He was a member of American Orthopedic Association, Deutsche Orthopedische Gesellschaft, Societe International de Chirurgie, Societe Francaise D'Orthopedie.

== Other interests ==
Abbott was a member of several Greek letter fraternities, as well as of the Cumberland County Medical Society, the Maine Medical Association, and American Medical Association. He was a director in the Fidelity Trust Company, member of the Board of Trade, and connected with various corporations. In politics he was a staunch Republican.

Abbott was also an Assistant Secretary of The Maine Association Opposed to Suffrage for Women. He was a member of the Board of Managers of the Female Orphan Asylum, Vice President of the Portland District Nursing Association of Portland, member of Parish House Committee of State Street Church, member Parish Banquets Committee of State Street Church, Chairman of Hospital Committee of the Madelyn Shaw Fruit and Flower Fund, Children's Hospital. Abbott died on August 27, 1938, aged 66.
