= Lake Umatilla =

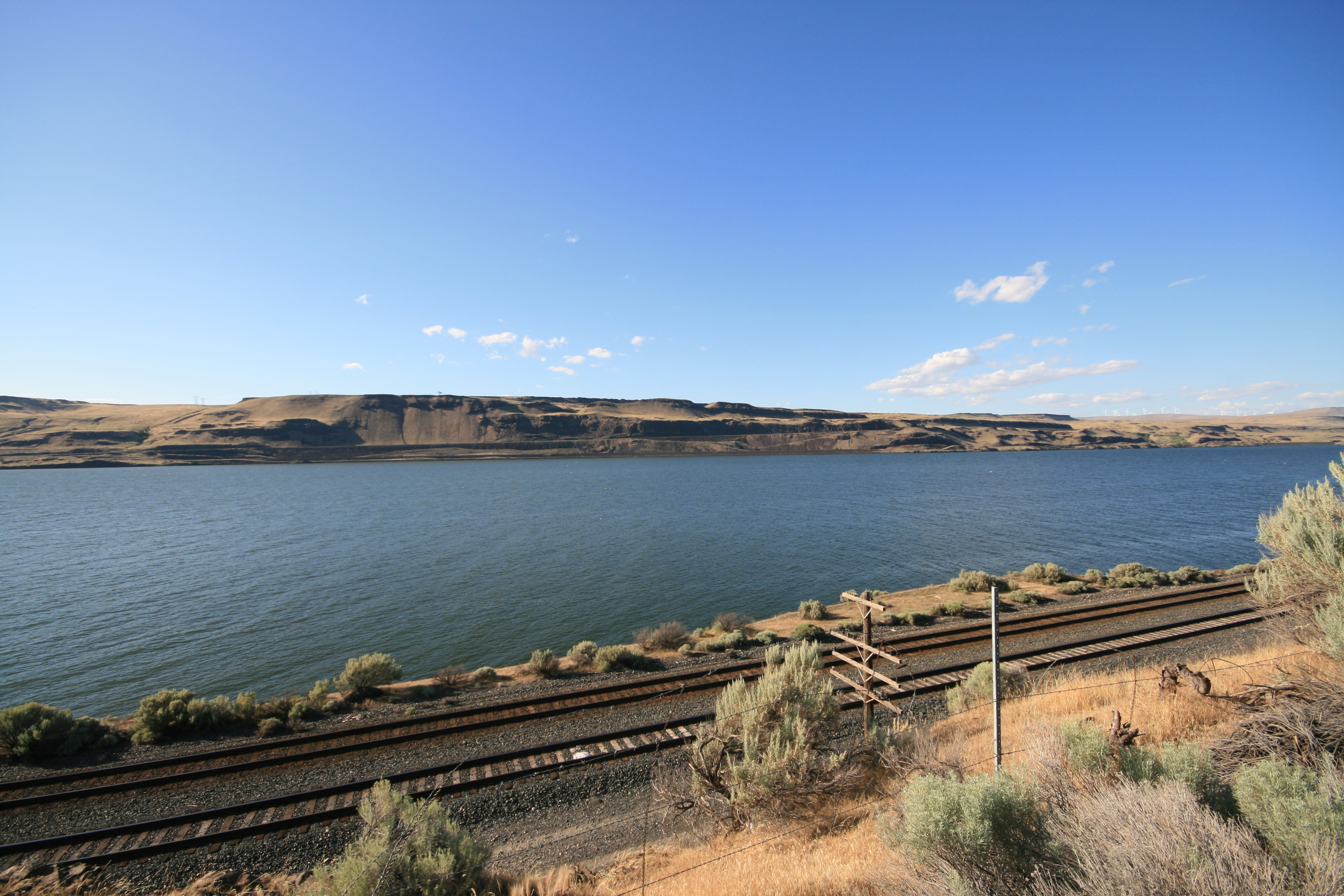

- Location within Oregon Location within Washington (state) Location within the United States
- Location: Oregon / Washington
- Coordinates: 45°43′3″N 120°41′38″W
- Type: reservoir
- Primary inflows: Columbia River
- Primary outflows: Columbia River
- Basin countries: United States
- First flooded: 1971
- Max. length: 110 mi (177 km)
- Surface elevation: 266 ft (81 m)

Lake Umatilla is a 110-mile (177 km) long reservoir on the Columbia River in the United States, on the border of the U.S. states of Washington and Oregon. It was created in 1971 with the construction of John Day Dam, and stretches upstream to the McNary Dam. It lies in parts of Sherman, Gilliam, Morrow, and Umatilla counties in Oregon, and Klickitat and Benton counties in Washington.

== See also ==
- List of lakes in Washington (state)
- List of lakes in Oregon
- List of hydroelectric dams on the Columbia River
