= Andrew Mead =

American judge (born 1952)

Chief Justice of the Maine Supreme Judicial Court
- Acting
- In office April 14, 2020 – June 8, 2021
- Preceded by: Leigh Saufley
- Succeeded by: Valerie Stanfill

Associate Justice of the Maine Supreme Judicial Court
- Incumbent
- Assumed office March 22, 2007
- Appointed by: John Baldacci
- Preceded by: Howard H. Dana Jr.

Personal details
- Born: Andrew MacDonald Mead; 1952 (age 72–73)
- Education: University of Maine, Orono (BA); New York Law School (JD)

Andrew MacDonald Mead (born 1952) is a justice of the Maine Supreme Judicial Court since 2007. His current term expires in 2028.

Mead attended the University of Maine and New York Law School.

He has been a member of the Bangor law firms of Paine, Lynch & Weatherbee and Mitchell & Stearns. He is a past President of the Maine State Bar Association. He was appointed to the Maine District Court in 1990 and the Maine Superior Court in 1992. He served as chief justice of the Maine Superior Court from 1999 to 2001. He was appointed to the Maine Supreme Judicial Court in 2007. He has served as judicial liaison to the Maine Rules of Evidence Advisory Committee and chaired the Task Force on Electronic Court Records. He has been active in a number of court technology and jury reform initiatives. He is a member of the University of Maine adjunct faculty.

== Notes ==
- Material on this page was initially imported from the Judgepedia article on Andrew Mead, and has been expressly released under the GFDL per Judgepedia:Copyrights.

Political offices
Preceded by Howard H. Dana Jr.	Associate Justice of the Maine Supreme Judicial Court; 2007–present	Incumbent
Preceded by Leigh Saufley	Chief Justice of the Maine Supreme Judicial Court; Acting; 2020–2021	Succeeded by Valerie Stanfill
