= Paula D. Silsby =

American lawyer (born 1951)

Paula Diane Silsby (born June 1, 1951 in Bangor, Maine) is a former U.S. Attorney for the District of Maine. Both her father and her grandfather have been Superior Court justices. Her father, Judge Herbert T. Silsby, served as a Superior Court justice in Ellsworth, Maine from 1977 to 1992.

She obtained her B.A. from Mount Holyoke College in 1973 and her J.D. from the University of Maine School of Law in 1976. She served as Assistant U.S. Attorney for the District of Maine from 1977 until 2001. She served In the criminal division in the U.S. Attorney's office from 1994 until 2001.

In 1985, she was a co-founder of the Pine Grove Child Development Center, Inc. In 1998, she received the Caroline Duby Glassman award from the Maine Bar Association. This award is given annually to a woman who has done the most to advance the position of women in the legal profession. She also has received Attorney General Janet Reno's Director's Award for Executive Achievement. Active in the Alumni Association of the University of Maine School of Law, she has served two terms on that association's board of directors. In 2005, she received the Deborah Morton Award from the University of New England. The Deborah Morton Award is given to women who have achieved high distinction in their careers or in public service.

== Appointment as U.S. Attorney ==
In 2001, she became U.S. Attorney for the District of Maine under unusual circumstances. Normally, a U.S. Attorney is nominated by the president and confirmed by the United States Senate, usually after a name has been suggested to the president by the senior senator from that state who is of the same political party as the president.

2006 dismissal of U.S. attorneys controversy
- Timeline
- Summary of attorneys
- Congressional hearings
- List of dismissed attorneys
- All related articles

In March 2001, the senior senator for Maine, Olympia Snowe, recommended Silsby for the post of U.S. Attorney. However, Silsby's name was never forwarded by the White House to the Senate. Instead, she was appointed U.S. Attorney on an interim basis by Attorney General John Ashcroft. She took her oath of office on September 3, 2001. Her term as an Attorney General-interim appointee expired after 120 days, and she was re-appointed by the U.S. District Court, pending a Senate approval of a presidential nominee. As of 2007, she is one of only three U.S. attorneys who have been appointed in this way (the others are William Leone of Colorado and Deborah Rhodes of Alabama). Silsby is by far the longest serving interim U.S. Attorney.

In 2007 it was revealed that Silsby's name was among those U.S. Attorneys who were considered for dismissal as part of the dismissal of U.S. attorneys controversy.
