= Nancy A. Henry =

American Poet (born 1961)

- Born: November 15, 1961 (age 64); Chipley, Florida, U.S.
- Education: St. Andrews Presbyterian College (B.A.); University of Maine (J.D.)
- Occupation: Poet
- Spouse: Harold Persing

Nancy A. Henry (born November 15, 1961) is an American poet.

== Background ==
Nancy Henry was born Chipley, Florida, on November 15, 1961, to J. F. and Nancy J. Henry, and spent her early years in Gainesville, Florida. She graduated with a bachelor's degree in political science from St. Andrews Presbyterian College in 1982. She moved to Maine in 1983 to attend the University of Maine School of Law, from which she graduated with her JD degree in 1986.

Henry is editor and publisher of Cardinal Flower Journal, an online literary magazine featuring writing and photography of rural New England. She is a former adjunct instructor of English and Humanities at Central Maine Community College, University of Southern Maine, Thomas College, and Southern Maine Community College. From 1986 to 2007, she was a practicing attorney, working primarily in the area of child advocacy. Formerly, she has served as assistant attorney general of the state of Maine in the Department of Child Protection. She lives in Wenham, Massachusetts, with her husband, physicist Dr. Harold Persing. The couple have three grown children.

== Published works ==
Henry is the author of three full-length collections of poetry: from Sheltering Pines Press, Our Lady of Let’s All Sing (2007, ISBN 978-0-9776158-8-9), Who You Are (2008, ISBN 978-0-615-17555-3), and, from Moon Pie Press, "Sarx" (2010, ISBN 978-1-4507-0739-8). She is co-founder, with Alice N. Persons, of Moon Pie Press, and served as co-editor from its founding until 2005.

Henry is also the author of two chapbooks from Musclehead Press, Anything Can Happen (2001) and Hard (2003); two chapbooks from Moon Pie Press, Eros Ion (2004) and Europe on $5 a Day (2005, ISBN 0-9765166-2-4). Her first chapbook, Brie Fly, is now out-of-print.

Her work has been anthologized in Grace Notes (Sheltering Pines Press, 2002), Infini Tea (Sheltering Pines Press, 2004); Velvet Avalanche ([Satjah Projects], 2005); Fierce With Reality (Just Write Books, 2006) ISBN 978-0-9788628-0-0, and A Sense of Place, (Bay River Press, 2002, ISBN 0-9721173-0-X) as well as the first Moon Pie Press anthology, A Moxie and a Moon Pie (2005 ISBN 0-9769929-1-4). Henry's poems have been featured by Garrison Keillor on The Writer's Almanac.

She has been nominated four times for the Pushcart Prize, and has served as an associate editor of the literary journal The Café Review.
