= Leigh Saufley =

American judge (born 1954)

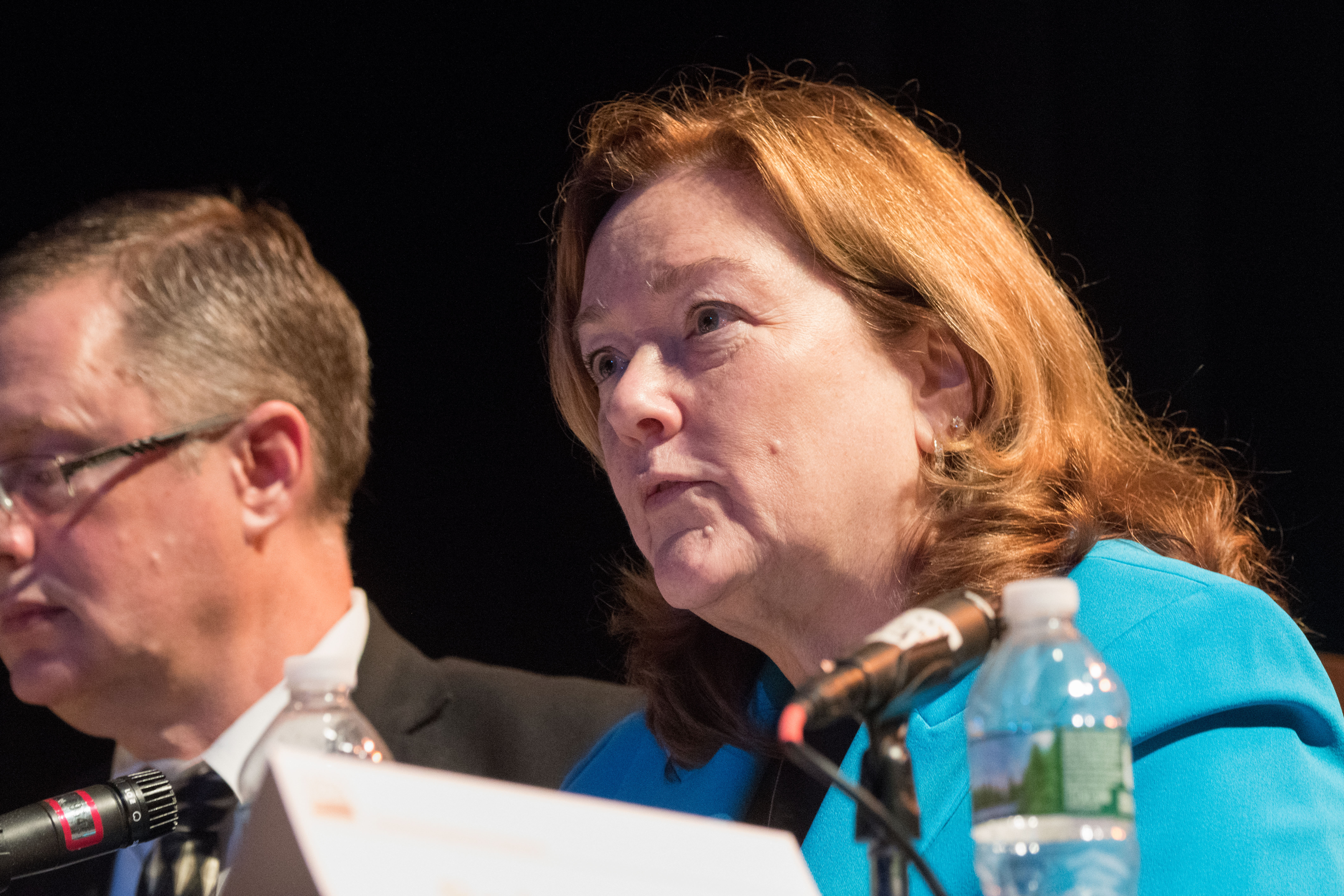

Chief Justice of the Maine Supreme Judicial Court
- In office December 6, 2001 – April 14, 2020
- Appointed by: Angus King
- Preceded by: Daniel Wathen
- Succeeded by: Andrew Mead (Acting)

Personal details
- Born: Leigh Ingalls; June 21, 1954 (age 70); Portland, Maine, U.S.
- Spouse: William Saufley
- Children: 2
- Education: University of Maine (BA); University of Maine School of Law (JD)

Leigh Ingalls Saufley (born June 21, 1954) is an American lawyer who is the dean of the University of Maine School of Law. She was previously Chief Justice of the Maine Supreme Judicial Court.

Saufley grew up in South Portland, Maine, and attended the University of Maine and the University of Maine School of Law. She was first appointed to the Maine District Court in 1990, and to the Supreme Judicial Court in 1997. She was sworn in as Chief Justice of the Supreme Judicial Court in 2001, becoming both Maine's first woman and the youngest person ever to serve in the position. She served as chief justice until 2020 when she was hired as the eighth Dean of the University of Maine School of Law.

== Early life and education ==
Saufley was born in Portland, Maine, on June 21, 1954, to Richard and Janet Ingalls. She grew up in South Portland, Maine with two younger brothers, Andrew and Jim, attended South Portland High School and graduated in 1972. She was a member of Phi Beta Kappa at the University of Maine, graduating with a degree in psychology in 1976. Saufley graduated from the University of Maine School of Law with her Juris Doctor in 1980.

== Career ==
=== Judiciary path ===
Shortly after graduating from law school, Saufley accepted a position in a small Ellsworth law firm working with the Maine Attorney General's Office and the Department of Health and Human Services on family law policy, becoming one of the first female deputy attorneys general there. She was also the Assistant to the General Counsel at the U.S. Veterans Administration counsel's office at Togus for a short time.

Governor John R. McKernan Jr. appointed Saufley to the Maine District Court bench in 1990 and to the Superior Court in 1993. In October 1997, Governor Angus King appointed her Associate Justice of the Maine Supreme Judicial Court, and on December 6, 2001, King swore her in as Maine's first female Chief Justice of the Supreme Judicial Court and at the age of 47, becoming the youngest judge ever to serve as chief justice.

Saufley began her second seven-year term as chief justice in 2009 and was sworn in by Governor John Baldacci; her third term began in 2016 when she was sworn in by Governor Paul LePage.

=== Accomplishments as Chief Justice ===
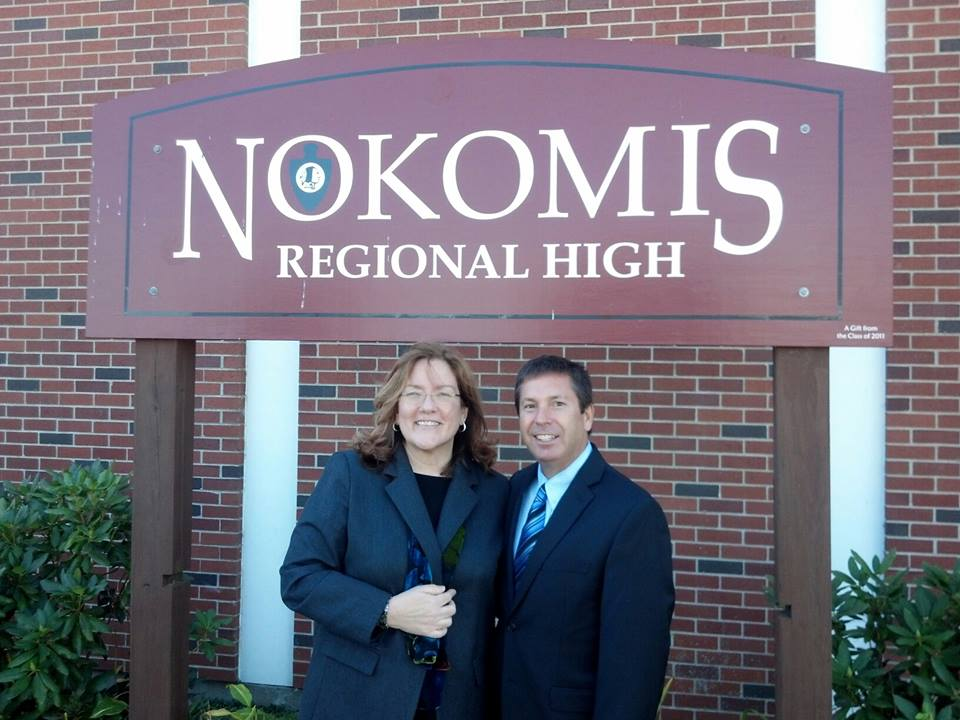
Saufley with Maine Representative Kenneth Fredette

Saufley is credited with several key changes in the Maine judicial system during her tenure. She improved the relationship between the Judicial, Legislative and Executive branches of the Maine state government; oversaw the rewriting of the Court's major practice and ethics rules; and helped increase the involvement of Maine Law students with the courts, especially in the area of service to traditionally underserved communities. In 2019, Saufley participated in a task force reexamining sentencing possibilities for juvenile offenders in Maine and voiced her concern with the lack of options available for teen offenders. She also emphasized to the task force the importance of addressing the disproportionate number of juveniles of color and LGBT juveniles in the Maine system.

Saufley's annual State of the Judiciary address reliably contained requests for the Maine Legislature to increase funding for court administration. She secured funding to increase court security, to establish a publicly accessible e-filing system to replace Maine's entirely paper-based files, and to completely replace the Kennebec, Penobscot and Waldo County courthouses and renovate several others.

In the early 2000s, Saufley and Representative John L. Martin conceived of a way to use the court to teach and promote civic education throughout Maine. In 2005, the appellate court began touring high schools across the state, turning auditoriums into courtrooms and giving students, faculty and staff the opportunity to observe arguments firsthand.

In 2010, U.S. Supreme Court Chief Justice John Roberts appointed Saufley to the Federal-State Jurisdiction Committee of the Judicial Conference of the United States.

Saufley has been a member of the Conference of Chief Justices, serving on their Committee on Courts, Children and Families; on the Government Affairs committee; and as chair of the New England Regional Chief Justices Committee.

=== Notable rulings ===
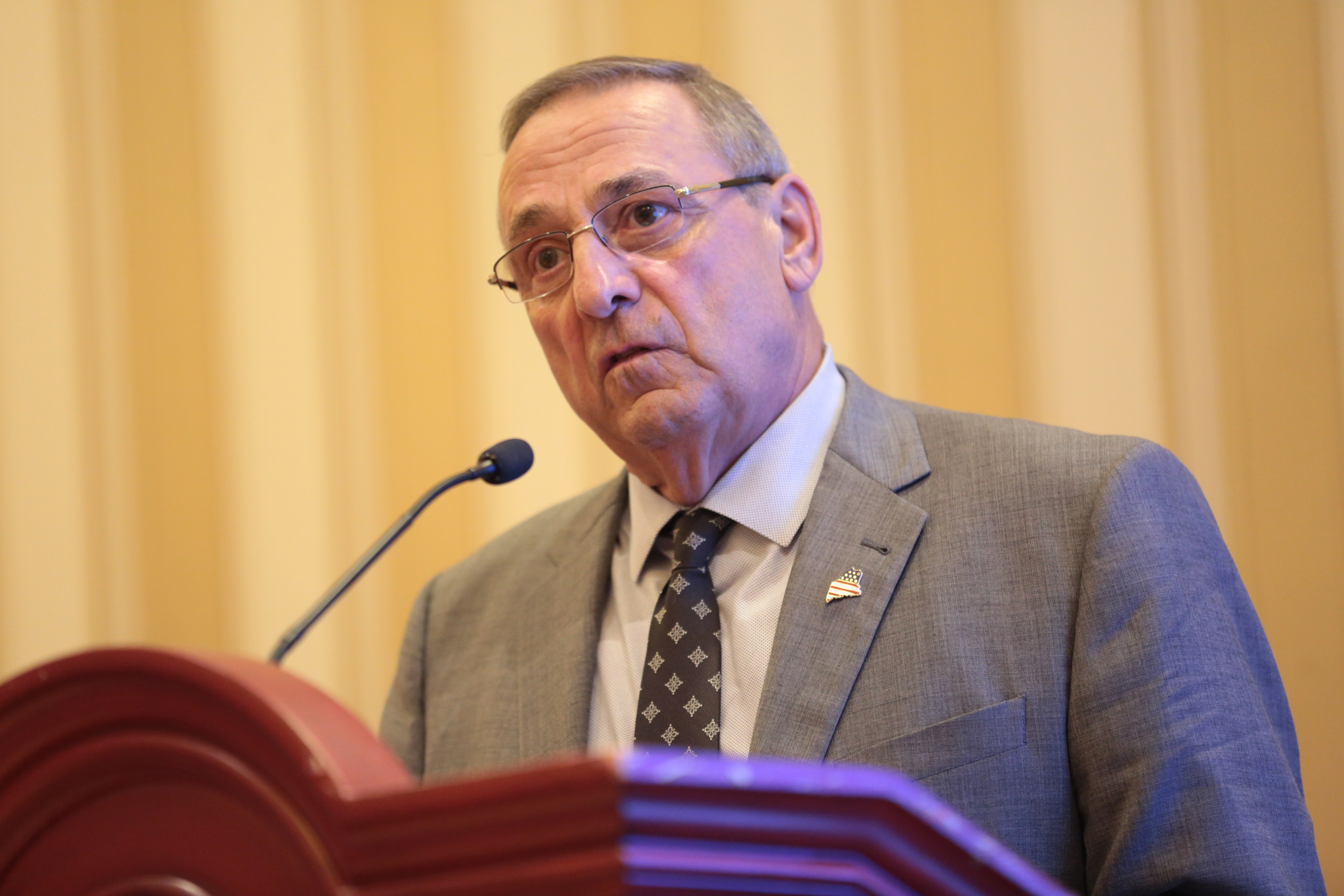
In one of the most notable cases of Saufley's judiciary career, the Maine Supreme Judicial Court ruled against the 2015 veto of more than 65 bills after the veto deadline by Governor Paul LePage (pictured).

In 2016, Maine voters approved a referendum question establishing ranked-choice voting for both primary and general elections for governor, U.S. Senate, U.S. House and state legislature beginning in 2018. In 2017, Saufley wrote a 2017 unanimous advisory opinion of the Supreme Judicial Court that the new law was unconstitutional.

In 2015, Governor Paul LePage vetoed more than 65 bills after the established deadline for doing so, citing the fact that the Maine Legislature was adjourned. The Maine Supreme Judicial Court's advisory ruling unanimously ruled against LePage, upholding the laws.

=== Law school dean ===
On April 8, 2020, following a national search, the University of Maine School of Law announced that Saufley would be accepting the position of eighth dean of the school. She retired from the Supreme Judicial Court bench on April 14, 2020, and began her position at Maine Law on April 15. Due to a recent restructuring, Saufley became the first dean to report directly to University of Maine System Chancellor Dannel Malloy instead of to the president of the University of Southern Maine, where the law school was once located.

== Personal life ==
Saufley has been married to Bill Saufley, whom she met while they were both students at the University of Maine School of Law, since 1981. They have two adult children.

During her February 2018 annual address, Saufley announced that she had been diagnosed with breast cancer in 2017, had undergone surgery and radiation, and was "on the other side".

== Awards and honors ==
- 1998 L. Kinvin Wroth Alumna of the Year Award, University of Maine School of Law
- 2002 Distinguished Alumna Award, University of Maine
- 2002 Women of Achievement Award, YWCA
- 2004 Honorary Doctor of Laws, University of New England
- 2004 Maryann Hartman Award, Women of Achievement, University of Maine
- 2005 Caroline Duby Glassman Award, Maine State Bar Association
- 2005 Portland Regionals Chamber Neal W. Allen Award
- 2008 Deborah Morton Award, University of New England
- 2008 Honorary Doctor of Humane Letters, University of Maine at Presque Isle
- 2010 Woman Who Makes a Difference Award, International Women’s Forum
- 2013 University of Southern Maine’s Sampson Catalyst for Change Award
- 2013 State Partner’s Award, Maine Children’s Trust
- 2021 Maine Women's Hall of Fame inductee

Legal offices
Preceded by Daniel Wathen	Chief Justice of the Maine Supreme Judicial Court; 2001–2020	Succeeded by Andrew Mead; Acting
