= Ocean and Coastal Law Journal =

- Discipline: Law
- Language: English

Publication details
- History: 1994-present
- Publisher: University of Maine School of Law (United States)
- Frequency: Biannually

Standard abbreviations
- Bluebook: Ocean & Coastal L.J.
- ISO 4: Ocean Coast. Law J.

Indexing
- ISSN: 1073-8843
- LCCN: 2009268090
- OCLC no.: 51254118

Links
- Journal homepage; Online archive

The Ocean and Coastal Law Journal is a biannual legal journal at the University of Maine School of Law. It covers legal issues related to domestic and international use of the sea and seashores. The journal is edited by second and third-year students. It was established in 1994 and is affiliated with the Center for Oceans & Coastal Law at Maine Law.

== Membership ==
Members are chosen by class rank and an annual writing contest. Second year (or third-year students who did not join their second year) are members of the staff and third-year students (with one year of experience) are members of the Board of Editors.
