= University of Maine School of Law =

Public law school in Portland, Maine, US

Coordinates: 43°39′40″N 70°16′44″W

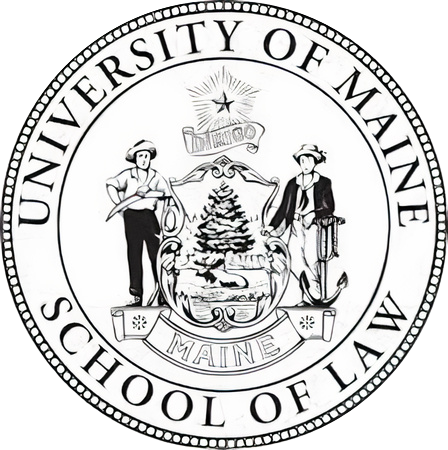
- Parent school: University of Maine System
- Established: 1962; 64 years ago
- School type: Public law school
- Dean: Leigh Saufley
- Location: Portland, Maine, United States
- USNWR ranking: 91st (tie) (2026)
- Bar pass rate: 85.06%
- Website: mainelaw.maine.edu
- ABA profile: Standard 509 Report
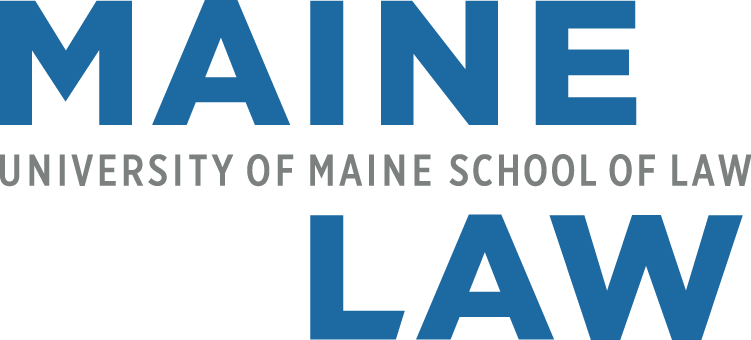

The University of Maine School of Law (Maine Law) is the law school of Maine's University System located in Portland, Maine. It is accredited by the American Bar Association and is Maine's only law school.

Many of Maine's judges, legal scholars, politicians, and community leaders are graduates of the law school.

== History ==
The present-day law school traces its origins to two separate institutions. The original University of Maine College of Law was established in 1898 in Bangor, Maine. The law school was one of the 27 charter members of the Association of American Law Schools. In 1918, the school was moved to the University of Maine campus in Orono. Two years later, due to financial difficulties, the school was closed in 1920. For the next several decades, Maine was without a law school.

In 1947, the Portland University Law School was established as a private law school affiliated with Portland University. In 1949, The Maine State Legislature authorized the Portland University Law School to confer the Bachelor of Laws (LL.B.) degree. The law school was never accredited by the American Bar Association. In 1961, Portland University merged with the University of Maine in Portland, and its law school became the predecessor of the modern Maine Law School.

The reorganized University of Maine School of Law admitted its first class in 1962. The school received provisional accreditation from the ABA in 1964, followed by full accreditation in 1966. Until 1972 the School of Law was located at 68 High Street, Portland. In 1972, the School of Law moved to the University of Maine School of Law Building on the University of Maine at Portland campus. In 2012, Maine Law celebrated its 50th anniversary, commemorating the opening of the modern law school in 1962. In 2023, the Law School moved to 300 Fore Street, on the waterfront of downtown Portland, known as the Old Port.

The law school's primary mission is to educate students to serve the public and private sectors with distinction; to contribute to the advancement of the law through scholarly and professional research and writing; and to engage in public services aimed at improving the legal system. Students have access to federal, state, county, city, and local agencies, courts, correctional facilities, law firms, and legal aid organizations in the Portland area. Portland is the major urban and legal center in the state. Facilities of special interest to law students are the Cumberland County Superior Court, the Maine Supreme Judicial Court, and the Federal District Court.

UM Law building and waterfront

== Academics ==
Students may take relevant courses in other programs and apply credit toward the J.D.; the maximum number of credits varies and must be approved. Maine Law offers two dual degree options with the Muskie School of Public Service at the University of Southern Maine: Juris Doctor and Master of Public Health (J.D./M.P.H.) and Juris Doctor and Master of Policy, Planning and Management (J.D/M.P.P.M). Students may also earn a dual J.D./Master of Business Administration (M.B.A.) degree, with the University of Maine School of Business. In addition, the Law School also offers LL.M. and J.S.D. programs.

Maine Law emphasizes hands-on training and offers an integrated clinical education program to students, including civil practice and criminal defense under the auspices of the Clinics at Maine Law (known as the Cumberland Legal Aid Clinic until 2025). This clinic includes the General Practice Clinic, Prisoner Assistance Clinic (civil matters), Youth Justice Clinic, and the Refugee and Human Rights Clinic.

Students can also gain academic credit for work at many nonprofit and government agencies through an extensive externship program. Seminars in commercial law, consumer law, constitutional law, intellectual property law, and international law are open to second, third-year, and LL.M students.

Maine Law has emerged as a leader in the field of Information Privacy Law, and students can earn a Certificate in Information Privacy Law. The Law School's Center for Law & Innovation hosts an annual Information Privacy Summer Institute, with a series of well-attended summer courses on critical and current information privacy issues.

In 2020, Maine Law began offering a Certificate in Environmental and Oceans Law.

The Law School is also the home of the Center for Oceans and Coastal Law, a teaching and interdisciplinary research center devoted to law and policy of the oceans.

The Judge Frank M. Coffin Lecture on Law and Public Service is held annually, along with the Justice for Women Lecture Series and other lectures and similar events. The Student Bar Association and other student organizations also offer guest lectures.

Maine Law has exchange programs with universities in several other countries, which enable students to experience a semester abroad, during which they gain an international perspective and develop a foundation in international law. The Law School currently offers international exchanges with Cergy-Pontoise University (France), City University of Hong Kong (China), National University of Ireland (Galway), Reykjavik University School of Law (Iceland), Tsinghua University School of Law (Beijing, China), Universite du Maine (Le Mans, France), University of New Brunswick (Canada), and University of Rennes 1 (France).

Maine Law also offers a domestic exchange program with Howard University School of Law. A semester at Howard Law School gives students an opportunity to pursue specialized courses, such as further study in intellectual property law, while making connections with Maine Law alumni in the Washington D.C. area.

== Publications ==
The school is home to the Maine Law Review and the Ocean and Coastal Law Journal.

== Rankings, admission and employment statistics ==
In spring 2025, U.S. News & World Report ranked the University of Maine School of Law 88th on its list of Best Law Schools. This represented a gain of 32 spots from the school's 2024 ranking, largest improvement of any law school that year. In 2026, the school fell to 91st, remaining among the top 100 law schools in the United States.

The Law School's student body is small—one of the smallest in the country—with an average of 80-90 students per entering class. There were 604 applicants for the class of 2020, of whom 325 (53.8%) were admitted, approximately two-thirds of them coming from Maine. The median LSAT score was 153, and the average GPA was 3.42. Over half (53.6%) of the students in the entering class were women; 15.5% were members of a racial minority group.

Maine Law's official ABA-required Employment Summary for 2023 Graduates shows that 87.1% of that class obtained full-time, long-term, Bar Passage Required/J.D. Advantage employment ten months after graduation. Maine Law's Law School Transparency under-employment score for the Class of 2024 is 12.2%, indicating the percentage of the Class of 2024 unemployed, pursuing an additional degree, or working in a non-professional, short-term, or part-time job nine months after graduation.

== Costs ==
Tuition and fees Maine Law for the 2022–2023 academic year was $23,190 for residents and $34,710 for non-residents. The Law School Transparency estimated debt-financed cost of attendance for three years is $136,087 for residents and $175,673 for nonresidents.

== Notable alumni ==
=== University of Maine College of Law (1898-1920) ===
| Name | Class | Notability | Ref. |
|---|---|---|---|
| George H. Worster | 1905 | Justice of the Maine Supreme Judicial Court, 1939–1942 | |
| John Buckley | 1907 | United States Attorney for the District of Connecticut from 1924 to 1933 | |
| Raymond Fellows | 1909 | Justice and Chief Justice of the Maine Supreme Judicial Court, 1946–1956 | |
| Frank Fellows | 1911 | U.S. Representative from Maine, 1941–1951 | |
| Charles Bayley Adams | 1913 | Justice of the Vermont Supreme Court, 1949–1961 | |
| Abraham M. Rudman | 1917 | Justice of the Maine Supreme Judicial Court, 1965–1966 | |

=== Portland University Law School (1947-1961) ===
| Name | Class | Notability | Ref. |
|---|---|---|---|
| John P. Connarn | 1951 | Vermont Attorney General, 1965–1967 | |
| Kenneth M. Curtis | 1959 | 68th governor of Maine 1967–1975 | |

=== University of Maine School of Law (1962-present) ===
| Name | Class | Notability | Ref. |
|---|---|---|---|
| Joseph E. Brennan | 1963 | 70th governor of Maine 1979–1987 | |
| Daniel Wathen | 1965 | Chief Justice of the Maine Supreme Judicial Court, 1992–2001 | |
| Susan W. Calkins | 1970 | Justice of the Maine Supreme Judicial Court, 1998–2007 | |
| Thomas E. Delahanty II | 1970 | United States Attorney for the District of Maine, 2010–2017 | |
| Joseph Jabar | 1971 | Justice of the Maine Supreme Judicial Court, 2009–2024 | |
| Gary Thorne | 1973 | Announcer for ESPN and ABC | |
| John R. McKernan Jr. | 1974 | 71st governor of Maine 1987–1995 | |
| James Tierney | 1974 | 51st Maine Attorney General 1981–1991, Professor at Columbia Law School 1991–present | |
| John A. Woodcock Jr. | 1976 | Chief Justice of the United States District Court for the District of Maine, 2009–present | |
| Paula D. Silsby | 1976 | United States Attorney for the District of Maine, 2001–2010 | |
| Janet Mills | 1976 | 55th and 57th Maine Attorney General, 2009–2011; 2013–2018, 75th Governor of Maine 2019–present | |
| Gerard Conley Jr. | 1979 | Member of the Maine Senate, 1990–1994 | |
| Leigh Saufley | 1980 | First Female Chief Justice of the Maine Supreme Judicial Court, 2001–2020 | |
| Robert Murray | 1985 | Maine State Senator, 1996–2000 | |
| Valerie Stanfill | 1985 | Chief Justice of the Maine Supreme Judicial Court, 2021– | |
| Donna Bailey | 1986 | Member of the Maine Senate, 2020–present | |
| Nancy A. Henry | 1986 | poet | |
| G. Steven Rowe | 1987 | 54th Maine Attorney General, 2001–2009 | |
| David Lemoine | 1988 | State Treasurer of Maine, 2005–2010 | |
| Anne Carney | 1990 | Member of the Maine Senate, 2020–present | |
| Julia Spencer-Fleming | 1990 | novelist of mystery fiction | |
| Dana Hanley | 1990 | Member of the Maine Senate, 1992–1996 | |
| Mark Lawrence | 1990 | President of the Maine Senate, 1997–2000 | |
| Steve Abbott | 1991 | Athletic director at the University of Maine, 2010–present | |
| William Schneider | 1993 | 56th Maine Attorney General | |
| Kenneth Fredette | 1994 | Minority Leader of the Maine House of Representatives, 2012–2018 | |
| Libby Mitchell | 2004 | President of the Maine Senate, 2008–2010 | |
| Heather Sanborn | 2004 | attorney, businesswoman, Maine Public Advocate, 2025–present, member of the Maine Senate, 2018–22, Maine State Representative, 2016–2018 | |
| Seth Goodall | 2005 | Maine State Senator from the 19th District, 2008–2013 | |
| Jeremy Fischer | 2008 | Maine State Representative, 2000–2006 | |
| David Sinclair | 2010 | Maine State Representative, 2023- | |

== Administration ==
| Order | Name | Position(s) | Term Began | Term Ended | Alumnus/na? | Ref. |
|---|---|---|---|---|---|---|
| 1 | Edward S. Godfrey III | Dean, professor emeritus | 1962 | 1973 | no | |
| 2 | Bert S. Prunty | Dean | 1973 | 1978 | no | |
| 3 | L. Kinvin Wroth | Dean | 1978 | 1990 | no | |
| 4 | Donald Zillman | Dean | 1992 | 1998 | no | |
| 5 | Colleen Khoury | Dean | 1998 | 2005 | no | |
| 6 | Peter Pitegoff | Dean | 2005 | 2015 | no | |
| 7 | Danielle Conway | Dean | 2015 | 2019 | no | |
| 8 | Dmitry Bam | Interim Dean | 2019 | 2020 | no | |
| 9 | Leigh Saufley | President and Dean | 2020 | active | yes | |
