= Howard H. Dana Jr. =

American judge (born 1940)

Howard Hinkley Dana Jr. (born September 28, 1940), of Portland, Maine, was a justice of the Maine Supreme Judicial Court from March 4, 1993, to March 2, 2007.

Born in Portland, Maine, Dana graduated from Bowdoin College in 1962, and received JD and MPA degrees from Cornell University in 1966. Dana then clerked for Judge Edward T. Gignoux of the United States District Court for the District of Maine in Portland before entering private practice, where he remained until 1993.

On March 4, 1993, Governor John R. McKernan Jr. appointed Dana to a seat on the Maine Supreme Judicial Court.

Political offices
Preceded by Vacant seat	Justice of the Maine Supreme Judicial Court; 1993–2007	Succeeded by Andrew Mead
