= Maine Superior Court =

Trial court of general jurisdiction in Maine

The Maine Superior Court is the trial court of general jurisdiction in the Maine state court system.

All state jury trials are held in the Superior Court. The court is located in each of Maine's 16 counties (with two locations in Aroostook County), in eight judicial regions. The Court consists of 18 justices who all have statewide jurisdiction and travel to the different courthouses to hold court, with a number of active retired judges as well. Justices are nominated by the Governor and confirmed by the Maine Senate and are appointed to seven-year terms.

Maine's Supreme Judicial Court created a statewide Business and Consumer Docket (BCD), which includes within its jurisdiction complex case types that might be found on other states' business and commercial court dockets; but also includes, for example, class actions and complex consumer rights cases arising out of business or government dealings. Cases eligible for this specialized docket are cases that could otherwise have been heard in the Superior Court or Maine's District Court. The BCD has a distinct set of procedural rules. The BCD has two assigned judges from either the Superior or District Courts, who are designated by the Chief Justice of the Supreme Judicial Court. As of June 2024, the current BCD judges are Superior Court judge Thomas McKeon and District Court judge Michael A. Duddy. Then Superior Court Chief Justice Thomas E. Humphrey was one of the first BCD judges, along with District Court Chief Justice John C. Nivison.

== Chief Justices of the Maine Superior Court ==
The position of Chief Justice of the Maine Superior Court was authorized by the Maine Legislature, P.L. 1983, c. 269, § 7, to be effective on January 1, 1984. The Chief Justice is designated by the Chief Justice of the Supreme Judicial Court to "serve at the pleasure and under the supervision of the Chief Justice of the Supreme Judicial Court and shall be responsible for the operation of the Superior Court." 4 MRSA §101-A.

Chief justice	Start of term	End of term
Robert W. Clifford	January 1, 1984	August 1, 1986
Morton A. Brody	August 1, 1986	June 6, 1990
Thomas E. Delahanty II	June 6, 1990	June 6, 1995
Roland A. Cole	June 7, 1995	June 30, 1997
Margaret J. Kravchuk	July 1, 1997	June 30, 1999
Andrew A. Mead	July 1, 1999	June 30, 2001
Nancy D. Mills	July 1, 2001	September 1, 2004
Thomas E. Humphrey	September 1, 2004	April 29, 2015
Roland A. Cole	June 10, 2015	2018
Robert Mullen	2018	present

== Current justices ==
As of April 20, 2023, the justices of the Maine Superior Court are:

#	Name	Residence	County	Began service	First appointed by
107	M. Michaela Murphy	Rome	Kennebec	October 1, 2007	John Baldacci
110	Ann M. Murray	Bangor	Penobscot	August 25, 2010	John Baldacci
111	Robert Murray	Bangor	Penobscot	August 25, 2010	John Baldacci
112	MaryGay Kennedy	Auburn	Androscoggin	August 25, 2010	John Baldacci
113	John O'Neil	Kennebunk	York	September 27, 2011	Paul LePage
114	Daniel Billings	Bowdoinham	Sagadahoc	March 18, 2014	Paul LePage
115	Robert Mullen	Waterville	Kennebec	March 18, 2014	Paul LePage
118	Bruce C. Mallonee	Bangor	Penobscot	June 10, 2015	Paul LePage
120	Harold Stewart II	Portland	Cumberland	April 4, 2016	Paul LePage
122	Stephen Nelson	Houlton	Aroostook	January 30, 2020	Janet Mills
123	Thomas McKeon	Falmouth	Cumberland	January 30, 2020	Janet Mills
124	Richard W. Mulhern	Falmouth	Cumberland	February 25, 2021	Janet Mills
125	Deborah P. Cashman	West Bath	Sagadahoc	January 26, 2022	Janet Mills
126	Julia M. Lipez	Cape Elizabeth	Cumberland	April 5, 2022	Janet Mills
127	Patrick Larson	Bangor	Penobscot	February 16, 2023	Janet Mills
128	Jennifer Archer	Falmouth	Cumberland	April 18, 2023	Janet Mills
129	James Martemucci	Arundel	York	April 20, 2023	Janet Mills

Active-retired justices of the Maine Superior Court:

- Roland A. Cole
- Paul A. Fritzsche
- E. Allen Hunter
- Nancy D. Mills
- William R. Stokes
- Thomas D. Warren

== Former justices ==
The former justices of the court are:

#	Name	Residence	County	Began service	Ended service	First appointed by	Reason for termination
1	Charles W. Goddard	Portland	Cumberland	February 28, 1871	November 4, 1871	Sidney Perham	resigned
2	Marquis DeLafayette Lane	Portland	Cumberland	November 4, 1871	September 15, 1872	Sidney Perham	death
3	Joseph W. Symonds	Portland	Cumberland	September 28, 1872	October 16, 1878	Sidney Perham	elevated to Maine Supreme Judicial Court
4	William Penn Whitehouse	Augusta	Kennebec	February 13, 1878	April 15, 1890	Seldon Connor	elevated to Maine Supreme Judicial Court
5	Percival Bonney	Portland	Cumberland	October 16, 1878	August 4, 1906	Seldon Connor	death
6	William M. Robinson	Houlton	Aroostook	March 25, 1885	July 1, 1893	Frederick Robie	seat abolished
7	Oliver G. Hall	Waterville	Kennebec	April 24, 1890	April 26, 1911	Edwin C. Burleigh	retired
8	Levi Turner	Portland	Cumberland	September 21, 1906	February 19, 1911	William T. Cobb	death
9	Joseph E. F. Connolly	Portland	Cumberland	March 2, 1911	March 2, 1918	Frederick W. Plaisted	term expired
10	Fred Emery Beane	Hallowell	Kennebec	April 26, 1911	May 14, 1924	Frederick W. Plaisted	retired (active retired)
11	Henry W. Oakes	Auburn	Androscoggin	July 16, 1917	March 31, 1928	Carl Milliken	retired (active retired)
12	Lauren M. Sanborn	South Portland	Cumberland	March 2, 1918	March 2, 1925	Carl Milliken	term expired
13	Bertram L. Smith	Patten	Penobscot	July 16, 1919	November 4, 1924	Carl Milliken	death
14	William H. Fisher	Augusta	Kennebec	May 21, 1924	August 31, 1940	Percival P. Baxter	retired (active retired)
15	George H. Worster	Bangor	Penobscot	November 25, 1924	December 21, 1939	Percival P. Baxter	elevated to Maine Supreme Judicial Court
16	Arthur Chapman	Portland	Cumberland	March 12, 1925	November 4, 1942	Owen Brewster	elevated to Maine Supreme Judicial Court
17	Harry Manser	Auburn	Androscoggin	April 1, 1928	July 18, 1935	Owen Brewster	elevated to Maine Supreme Judicial Court
18	George L. Emery	Biddeford	York	January 1, 1930	October 2, 1944	William Tudor Gardiner	death
19	James H. Hudson	Guilford	Piscataquis	January 1, 1930	November 20, 1933	William Tudor Gardiner	elevated to Maine Supreme Judicial Court
20	Sidney St. F. Thaxter	Portland	Cumberland	January 1, 1930	October 1, 1930	William Tudor Gardiner	elevated to Maine Supreme Judicial Court
21	Herbert T. Powers	Fort Fairfield	Aroostook	October 1, 1930	July 1, 1941	William Tudor Gardiner	retired
22	Herbert E. Holmes	Lewiston	Androscoggin	November 20, 1933	May 6, 1935	Louis J. Brann	death
23	Edward P. Murray	Bangor	Penobscot	July 18, 1935	September 18, 1947	Louis J. Brann	elevated to Maine Supreme Judicial Court
24	Albert Beliveau	Rumford	Oxford	July 18, 1935	March 3, 1954	Louis J. Brann	elevated to Maine Supreme Judicial Court
25	Raymond B. Fellows	Bangor	Penobscot	December 10, 1939	May 1, 1946	Lewis O. Barrows	elevated to Maine Supreme Judicial Court
26	Robert A. Cony	Augusta	Kennebec	October 31, 1940	January 1, 1945	Lewis O. Barrows	death
27	Nathaniel Tompkins	Houlton	Aroostook	October 9, 1941	August 23, 1945	Sumner Sewall	elevated to Maine Supreme Judicial Court
28	Arthur E. Sewall	York	York	December 17, 1942	March 3, 1953	Sumner Sewall	retired (active retired)
29	Earle L. Russell	Cape Elizabeth	Cumberland	December 27, 1944	August 5, 1947	Sumner Sewall	death
30	Edward F. Merrill	Skowhegan	Somerset	February 1, 1945	June 2, 1948	Horace Hildreth	elevated to Maine Supreme Judicial Court
31	Robert B. Williamson	Augusta	Kennebec	September 5, 1945	May 5, 1949	Horace Hildreth	elevated to Maine Supreme Judicial Court
32	Frank A. Tirrell Jr.	Rockland	Knox	May 15, 1946	March 18, 1953	Horace Hildreth	elevated to Maine Supreme Judicial Court
33	William B. Nulty	Portland	Cumberland	September 18, 1947	March 16, 1949	Horace Hildreth	elevated to Maine Supreme Judicial Court
34	Percy T. Clarke	Ellsworth	Hancock	October 1, 1947	June 29, 1955	Horace Hildreth	elevated to Maine Supreme Judicial Court
35	Donald W. Webber	Auburn	Androscoggin	September 1, 1948	October 8, 1953	Horace Hildreth	elevated to Maine Supreme Judicial Court
36	Francis W. Sullivan	Cape Elizabeth	Cumberland	April 5, 1949	October 4, 1956	Frederick G. Payne	elevated to Maine Supreme Judicial Court
37	Granville C. Gray	Presque Isle	Aroostook	May 18, 1949	September 2, 1956	Frederick G. Payne	death
38	Harold C. Marden	Waterville	Kennebec	March 3, 1953	December 19, 1962	Burton M. Cross	elevated to Maine Supreme Judicial Court
39	Randolph Weatherbee	Hampden	Penobscot	March 25, 1953	December 21, 1966	Burton M. Cross	elevated to Maine Supreme Judicial Court
40	Cecil J. Siddall	Sanford	York	August 19, 1953	May 7, 1958	Burton M. Cross	elevated to Maine Supreme Judicial Court
41	Leonard F. Williams	Auburn	Androscoggin	November 4, 1953	March 30, 1964	Burton M. Cross	death
42	Walter M. Tapley Jr.	Portland	Cumberland	March 3, 1954	May 5, 1954	Burton M. Cross	elevated to Maine Supreme Judicial Court
43	Abraham M. Rudman	Bangor	Penobscot	June 9, 1954	May 30, 1965	Burton M. Cross	elevated to Maine Supreme Judicial Court
44	F. Harold Dubord	Waterville	Kennebec	June 29, 1955	October 4, 1956	Edmund Muskie	elevated to Maine Supreme Judicial Court
45	Charles A. Pomeroy	Portland	Cumberland	October 4, 1956	July 2, 1969	Edmund Muskie	elevated to Maine Supreme Judicial Court
46	James Archibald	Houlton	Aroostook	October 4, 1956	January 27, 1971	Edmund Muskie	elevated to Maine Supreme Judicial Court
47	Armand A. Dufresne Jr.	Lewiston	Androscoggin	October 4, 1956	August 24, 1965	Edmund Muskie	elevated to Maine Supreme Judicial Court
48	John P. Carey	Bath	Sagadahoc	May 7, 1958	December 10, 1958	Edmund Muskie	resigned
49	Thomas E. Delahanty	Lewiston	Androscoggin	December 31, 1958	September 5, 1973	Edmund Muskie	elevated to Maine Supreme Judicial Court
50	William S. Silsby	Aurora	Hancock	December 20, 1961	August 2, 1972	John H. Reed	retired
51	James L. Reid	Augusta	Kennebec	December 28, 1962	September 1, 1975	John H. Reed	retired (active retired)
52	Harold J. Rubin	Bath	Sagadahoc	May 20, 1964	January 15, 1979	John H. Reed	retired
53	Alton A. Lessard	Lewiston	Androscoggin	August 24, 1965	August 2, 1974	John H. Reed	retired (medical disability)
54	Lincoln Spencer	Kennebunkport	York	August 24, 1965	September 1, 1977	John H. Reed	retired
55	Albert Knudsen	Portland	Cumberland	May 4, 1966	December 31, 1973	John H. Reed	retired
56	David G. Roberts	Bangor	Penobscot	March 1, 1967	January 11, 1980	Kenneth M. Curtis	elevated to Maine Supreme Judicial Court
57	Sidney W. Wernick	Portland	Cumberland	July 2, 1969	September 30, 1970	Kenneth M. Curtis	elevated to Maine Supreme Judicial Court
58	William E. McCarthy	Rumford	Oxford	October 8, 1969	April 8, 1984	Kenneth M. Curtis	retired
59	Lewis I. Naiman	Gardiner	Kennebec	September 30, 1970	December 31, 1979	Kenneth M. Curtis	retired
60	James A. Bishop	Presque Isle	Aroostook	January 27, 1971	July 16, 1977	Kenneth M. Curtis	death
61	Ian MacInnes	Bangor	Penobscot	December 22, 1971	October 10, 1983	Kenneth M. Curtis	retired (active retired)
62	Harry P. Glassman	Portland	Cumberland	January 2, 1972	August 31, 1979	Kenneth M. Curtis	elevated to Maine Supreme Judicial Court
63	Edward Stern	Bangor	Penobscot	January 3, 1973	June 20, 1980	Kenneth M. Curtis	retired
64	Elmer H. Violette	Van Buren	Aroostook	September 5, 1973	August 31, 1981	Kenneth M. Curtis	elevated to Maine Supreme Judicial Court
65	Sumner J. Goffin	Portland	Cumberland	October 10, 1983	December 22, 1984	Kenneth M. Curtis	retired
66	Robert L. Browne	Bangor	Penobscot	March 20, 1974	November 26, 1984	Kenneth M. Curtis	retired (active retired)
67	Louis Scolnik	Lewiston	Androscoggin	October 10, 1974	September 7, 1973	Kenneth M. Curtis	elevated to Maine Supreme Judicial Court
68	David A. Nichols	Lincolnville	Waldo	October 1, 1975	May 23, 1977	James B. Longley	elevated to Maine Supreme Judicial Court
69	Stephen L. Perkins	South Portland	Cumberland	September 16, 1977	April 30, 1993	James B. Longley	retired (active retired)
70	Herbert T. Silsby II	Ellsworth	Hancock	September 16, 1977	February 28, 1992	James B. Longley	retired
71	Daniel Wathen	Augustua	Kennebec	September 16, 1977	August 31, 1981	James B. Longley	elevated to Maine Supreme Judicial Court
72	Robert W. Clifford	Lewiston	Androscoggin	June 8, 1979	August 1, 1986	James B. Longley	elevated to Maine Supreme Judicial Court
73	William E. McKinley	Portland	Cumberland	January 11, 1979	January 31, 1990	Joseph E. Brennan	retired (active retired)
74	Donald G. Alexander	Mount Vernon	Kennebec	February 15, 1980	September 2, 1998	Joseph E. Brennan	elevated to Maine Supreme Judicial Court
75	Jessie Briggs Gunther	Milo	Piscataquis	April 11, 1980	February 1, 1986	Joseph E. Brennan	resigned
76	Morton A. Brody	Waterville	Kennebec	July 18, 1980	July 6, 1990	Joseph E. Brennan	elevated to Maine Supreme Judicial Court
77	Carl O. Bradford	Yarmouth	Cumberland	October 23, 1981	August 31, 1998	Joseph E. Brennan	retired (active retired)
78	William S. Brodrick	Berwick	York	December 9, 1981	February 28, 1995	Joseph E. Brennan	retired (active retired)
79	Thomas E. Delahanty II	Lewiston	Androscoggin	November 4, 1983	June 30, 2010	Joseph E. Brennan	retired (active retired)
80	Paul T. Pierson	Caribou	Aroostook	January 17, 1984	June 30, 2001	Joseph E. Brennan	retired
81	G. Arthur Brennan	York	York	April 19, 1984	August 26, 2011	Joseph E. Brennan	retired (active retired)
82	Bruce W. Chandler	China	Kennebec	September 21, 1984	September 30, 1994	Joseph E. Brennan	retired
83	Eugene W. Beaulieu	Old Town	Penobscot	January 29, 1985	January 17, 1992	Joseph E. Brennan	resigned
84	Kermit Lipez	South Portland	Cumberland	June 14, 1985	May 12, 1994	Joseph E. Brennan	elevated to Maine Supreme Judicial Court
85	Jack O. Smith	Ellsworth	Hancock	March 27, 1986	September 30, 1992	Joseph E. Brennan	retired
86	Paul A. Fritzsche	Pownal	Cumberland	July 31, 1986	July 2015	Joseph E. Brennan	retired (active retired)
87	Roland A. Cole	Wells	York	September 25, 1986	December 31, 2019	Joseph E. Brennan	retired (active retired)
88	Margaret J. Kravchuk	Bangor	Penobscot	March 27, 1990	January 31, 2000	John R. McKernan Jr.	resigned
89	Andrew Mead	Bangor	Penobscot	May 28, 1992	March 22, 2007	John R. McKernan Jr.	elevated to Maine Supreme Judicial Court
90	Nancy D. Mills	Cornville	Somerset	February 18, 1993	December 31, 2019	John R. McKernan Jr.	retired (active retired)
91	Leigh Saufley	Portland	Cumberland	April 9, 1993	October 20, 1997	John R. McKernan Jr.	elevated to Maine Supreme Judicial Court
92	Francis C. Marsano	Belfast	Waldo	April 9, 1993	October 9, 2001	John R. McKernan Jr.	retired
93	Robert E. Crowley	Kennebunk	York	June 14, 1993	August 31, 2010	John R. McKernan Jr.	retired
94	John R. Atwood	Damariscotta	Lincoln	May 17, 1994	April 29, 2005	John R. McKernan Jr.	retired
95	Donald H. Marden	Waterville	Kennebec	December 8, 1994	January 1, 2008	John R. McKernan Jr.	retired (active retired)
96	Susan W. Calkins	Portland	Cumberland	May 31, 1995	September 2, 1998	Angus King	elevated to Maine Supreme Judicial Court
97	S. Kirk Studstrup	Augusta	Kennebec	October 20, 1997	October 1, 2007	Angus King	retired (active retired)
98	Jeffrey Hjelm	Dixmont	Penobscot	September 2, 1998	August 1, 2014	Angus King	elevated to Maine Supreme Judicial Court
99	Thomas E. Humphrey	Sanford	York	September 2, 1998	June 9, 2015	Angus King	elevated to Maine Supreme Judicial Court
100	Thomas D. Warren	Brunswick	Cumberland	September 2, 1998	December 31, 2021	Angus King	retired (active retired)
101	Ellen Gorman	Durham	Androscoggin	March 30, 2000	October 1, 2007	Angus King	elevated to Maine Supreme Judicial Court
102	E. Allen Hunter	Caribou	Aroostook	October 26, 2001	2015	Angus King	retired (active retired)
103	Joseph Jabar	Waterville	Kennebec	October 26, 2001	September 1, 2009	Angus King	elevated to Maine Supreme Judicial Court
104	Joyce A. Wheeler	Kittery	York	June 16, 2005	April 2015	John Baldacci	retired (active retired)
105	Andrew M. Horton	Falmouth	Cumberland	January 30, 2007	February 4, 2020	John Baldacci	elevated to Maine Supreme Judicial Court
106	Kevin M. Cuddy	Holden	Penobscot	April 24, 2007	2014	John Baldacci	retired
108	John C. Nivison	Winslow	Kennebec	October 1, 2007	January 2014	John Baldacci	resigned
109	William R. Anderson	Morrill	Waldo	February 21, 2008	November 23, 2022	John Baldacci	retired
116	William R. Stokes	Augusta	Kennebec	July 31, 2014	2023	Paul LePage	retired (active retired)
117	Lance E. Walker	South Paris	Oxford	June 10, 2015	October 17, 2018	Paul LePage	elevated to D. Me.
119	Wayne R. Douglas	Biddeford	York	June 10, 2015	March 10, 2023	Paul LePage	elevated to Maine Supreme Judicial Court
121	Valerie Stanfill	Wayne	Kennebec	January 8, 2020	June 8, 2021	Janet Mills	elevated to Maine Supreme Judicial Court

== See also ==
- Courts of Maine
