= List of Boston College Law School alumni =

Boston College Law School is a private law school in Newton, Massachusetts. Following are some of its notable alumni.

== Academia ==
- William M. Bulger, JD 1961, president of the University of Massachusetts System (1996–2003); president of the Massachusetts Senate (1978–1996)
- Dan Malloy, JD 1977, chancellor of the University of Maine System and governor of Connecticut
- Charles E. Rice, JD 1956, author, legal scholar, and professor of law

== Business ==
- James A. Champy, JD 1968, organizational theorist and chairman and chief executive officer of CSC Index

== Judiciary ==
- Robert W. Clifford, JD 1962, associate justice, Maine Supreme Judicial Court (1986–2009)
- John Dooley, LLB 1968, associate justice, Vermont Supreme Court (1987–2017)
- Barbara A. Dortch-Okara, JD 1974, judge, Boston Municipal Court (1984–1989); Massachusetts Superior Court (1989–2012)
- Thomas E. Humphrey, JD 1972, associate justice, Maine Supreme Judicial Court (2015–present)
- Ellen Segal Huvelle, JD 1975, judge, United States District Court for the District of Columbia (1999–present); associate judge, Superior Court of the District of Columbia (1990–1999)
- Okla Jones II, JD 1971, judge, United States District Court for the Eastern District of Louisiana (1994–1996)
- Erik P. Kimball, JD 1990, judge, United States Bankruptcy Court for the Southern District of Florida
- Leslie E. Kobayashi, JD 1983, judge, United States District Court for the District of Hawaii (2010–present)
- Myles Lane, JD 1938, justice, New York Supreme Court (1968–1979); professional ice hockey player; and college football player and coach
- Sandy N. Leal, JD 1989, judge, Orange County Superior Court (2018–present)
- Bernard J. Leddy, LLB 1934, judge, United States District Court for the District of Vermont (1966–1972)
- Lara Montecalvo, JD 2000, judge of the United States Court of Appeals for the First Circuit
- David Sutherland Nelson, JD 1960, judge, United States District Court for the District of Massachusetts (1979–1998); associate justice, Massachusetts Superior Court (1973–1979)
- Francis Patrick O'Connor, JD 1953, associate justice, Massachusetts Supreme Judicial Court
- William Orrick III, JD 1979, judge, United States District Court for the Northern District of California (2013–present)
- James A. Redden, LLB 1954, judge of the United States District Court for the District of Oregon, former Oregon attorney general, and state treasurer of Oregon
- William P. Robinson III, JD 1975, associate justice, Rhode Island Supreme Court (2004–present)
- Francis X. Spina, JD 1971, associate justice, Massachusetts Supreme Judicial Court (1999–2016)

== Law ==
=== Attorneys general ===
- Thomas Capano, JD 1973, former deputy attorney general of Delaware; convicted murderer
- Charity Clark, JD 2005, Vermont attorney general (2023 to present)
- Peter Neronha, JD 1989, 74th attorney general of Rhode Island
- James A. Redden, LLB 1954, Oregon attorney general, judge of the United States District Court for the District of Oregon, and state treasurer of Oregon
- Thomas Reilly, JD 1970, attorney general of Massachusetts (1999–2007)
- Warren Rudman, JD 1960, attorney general of New Hampshire (1970–1976) and United States senator from New Hampshire (1980–1993)
- Arlene Violet, JD 1974, attorney general of Rhode Island (1985–1987)

=== Government ===
- Charles Ferris, JD 1961, chairman of the Federal Communications Commission (1977–1981)
- Philip H. Hilder, JD 1981, former attorney-in-charge of the United States Department of Justice's Houston office of Organized Crime Strike Force
- Cameron Kerry, JD 1978, general counsel of the United States Department of Commerce (2009–2013), acting United States secretary of commerce (2013)
- Marilyn Mosby, JD 2007, state attorney for City of Baltimore (2014–present)
- Christina Nolan, JD 2004, former United States attorney for the District of Vermont (2017–2021)
- Charles Redding Pitt, JD 1977, U.S. attorney for the Middle District of Alabama (1994–2001)
- Marian T. Ryan, JD 1979, district attorney, Middlesex County, Massachusetts (2013–present)
- Debra Wong Yang, JD 1984, U.S. attorney for the Central District of California (2002–2006)
- Gerald T. Zerkin, JD 1976, federal public defender for Zacarias Moussaoui

=== Private practice ===
- J. W. Carney Jr., JD 1978, criminal defense attorney
- Michael S. Greco, JD 1972, president, American Bar Association (2006–2007)
- Ellen Krug, JD 1982, transgender activist, author, and civil law attorney

== Literature and journalism ==
- Kerry Kennedy, JD, human rights activist, writer, and daughter of Robert F. Kennedy
- William Landay, novelist
- Larry Ruttman, JD 1958, author
- Patric Verrone, JD 1984, president of the Writers Guild of America West

== Politics ==
- Edward P. Boland, JD 1936, United States congressman from Massachusetts
- Garrett J. Bradley, JD 1995, member of the Massachusetts House of Representatives (2000–2016)
- Scott Brown, JD 1985, U.S. ambassador to New Zealand and Samoa (2017–2020); United States senator from Massachusetts (2010–2013)
- William M. Bulger, JD 1961, president of the University of Massachusetts System (1996–2003); president of the Massachusetts Senate (1978–1996)
- Mike Capuano, JD 1977, United States congressman from Massachusetts (1999–2019); mayor of Somerville, Massachusetts (1990–1999)
- Paul Cellucci, JD 1973, U.S. ambassador to Canada (2001–2005); governor of Massachusetts (1999–2001); lieutenant governor of Massachusetts (1991–1999)
- Mike Connolly, JD 2009, member of the Massachusetts House of Representatives (2017–present)
- Silvio O. Conte, JD 1949, United States congressman from Massachusetts (1959–1991); member of the Massachusetts Senate (1951–1959)
- Bill Delahunt, JD 1967, United States congressman from Massachusetts (1997–2011); district attorney, Norfolk County, Massachusetts (1975–1997)
- James B. Eldridge, JD 2000, member of the Massachusetts Senate (2009–present); member of the Massachusetts House of Representatives (2003–2008)
- James N. Gabriel, LLB 1949, bankruptcy judge, United States District Court for the District of Massachusetts (1977–1990); United States attorney for the District of Massachusetts (1971–1972, 1973–1977)
- Deb Goldberg, JD 1983, 58th treasurer and receiver-general of Massachusetts (2015–present); former member of the Brookline Board of Selectmen (1998–2004)
- Margaret Heckler, JD 1956, United States congresswoman; United States Secretary of Health and Human Services; U.S. ambassador to Ireland
- Paul Hodes, JD 1978, United States congressman from New Hampshire (2007–2011)
- Jared Huffman, JD 1990, United States congressman from California (2013–present); former member of the California State Assembly (2006–2012)
- John Kerry, JD 1976, United States secretary of state (2013–2017), United States senator (1985–2013), 2004 Democratic candidate for president of the United States
- David Linsky, JD 1982, member of the Massachusetts House of Representatives (1999–present)
- Mark Longietti, JD 1988, member of the Pennsylvania House of Representatives (2007–present)
- Paul Loscocco, JD 1987, member of the Massachusetts House of Representatives (2001–2009)
- Frank Lowenstein, JD 1997, United States special envoy for Middle East Peace (2013; 2014–2017)
- Stephen F. Lynch, JD 1991, United States congressman (2001–present)
- Dan Malloy, JD 1977, governor of Connecticut (2011–2019) and chancellor of the University of Maine System
- Ed Markey, JD 1972, United States senator (2013–present), United States congressman (1976–2013)
- Grier Raggio, JD 1968, Democratic candidate in 32nd congressional district of Texas
- James A. Redden, LLB 1954, State Treasurer of Oregon, judge of the United States District Court for the District of Oregon, and former Attorney General
- Manuel Rodríguez Orellana, JD 1975, Puerto Rican Independence Party (senator 2000) and professor of law (retired)
- Warren Rudman, JD 1960, United States senator from New Hampshire (1980–1993); Attorney General of New Hampshire (1970–1976)
- Thomas Salmon, JD 1957, governor of Vermont (1973–1977)
- Bobby Scott, JD 1973, United States congressman from Virginia (1993–present)
- Michael A. Sullivan, JD 1985, mayor of Cambridge, Massachusetts
- Richard Thompson, member of the Maine House of Representatives (1994–2000)
- Kevin White, LLB 1955, mayor of Boston, Massachusetts (1968–1984)
- Diane Wilkerson, JD 1981, first African-American member of the Massachusetts Senate (1993–2008)

== Sports ==
- Myles Lane, JD 1938, professional ice hockey player; college football player and coach, and justice, New York Supreme Court (1968–1979)
- Christopher Liwski, Canadian American rower, six-time U.S. National Team member, a double world championship medal winner, and two-time member of the U.S. Olympic rowing team
- Shannon Miller, JD 2007, Olympic gymnast
- Cammy Myler, JD 2001, 4-time Winter Olympian

== Fictional ==
- Frank Galvin, JD 1952, main character in the film The Verdict, portrayed by Paul Newman
