= Doe v. Regional School Unit 26 =

Transgender rights case in the United States

- Court: Maine Supreme Judicial Court
- Full case name: John Doe et al. v. Regional School Unit 26
- Decided: January 30, 2014

Holding
- The Maine Human Rights Act requires public schools to allow transgender students to use the restroom that aligns with their gender identity.

Court membership
- Judges sitting: Donald G. Alexander, Warren Silver, Andrew Mead, Ellen Gorman, Joseph Jabar
- Chief judge: Leigh Saufley

Case opinions
- Decision by: Silver, joined by Alexander, Silver, Gorman, and Habar
- Concurrence: Saufley
- Dissent: Mead

Doe v. Regional School Unit 26 (also referred to as Doe v. Clenchy) was a landmark anti-discrimination case decided by the Maine Supreme Judicial Court in June 2013 involving right of transgender student Nicole Maines to use the female bathroom in her high school. Upon initial filing, Maines was referenced by the pseudonym "Susan Doe" in court papers to protect her identity.

The case marked the first time that a state court ruled that denying a transgender student access to the bathroom consistent with their gender identity is unlawful.

== Background ==
The Maine Human Rights Act was enacted in 1971 to protect Mainers against discrimination on the basis of race or color, disability, religion, and ancestry or national origin. Attempts to add sexual orientation to the list of protected characteristics began as early as 1977, but weren't successful until 2005, when the legislature finally passed a law amending the Maine Human Rights Act to include sexual orientation and an attempted people's veto failed.

== Case history ==
Nicole Maines was a student in Regional School Unit 26 in Orono, Maine, who began to identify as transgender when she was a toddler. She attended school in "gender-neutral clothing" until third grade, when she began openly identifying as a girl. In fourth grade, the school implemented a 504 Plan to prepare Maines for the following year, when students would have communal bathrooms separated by sex.

In 2007, while Maines was in fifth grade, a male student followed her into the girls' restroom, claiming he was entitled to use it since Maines was. The student was acting on instructions from his grandfather, who opposed Maines' use of the girls' restroom. To resolve the issue, the school district required that Maines only use a staff bathroom.

Maines' family filed a complaint with the Maine Human Rights Commission, which joined them in a suit against the district in 2009, arguing that Maines' gender identity was protected under the Maine Human Rights Act. In 2012, a state judge sided with the district, saying the district had upheld its responsibility to Maines by providing her an alternate restroom, and was not liable for bullying she had faced from other students. In his decision, Judge William Anderson wrote, "It is no doubt a difficult thing to grow up transgender in today's society. This is a sad truth, which cannot be completely prevented by the law alone. The law casts a broad stroke where one more delicate and refined is needed. Although others mistreated [the girl] because she is transgender, our Maine Human Rights Act only holds a school accountable for deliberate indifference to known, severe and pervasive student-on-student harassment. It does no more."

== Supreme Judicial Court ==
Maines' family appealed to the Maine Supreme Judicial Court. In June 2014, the Maine Supreme Judicial Court ruled that the school district had violated the Maine Human Rights Act, with Judge Warren Silver writing, "RSU 26’s later decision to ban [Nicole] from the girls’ bathroom, based not on a determination that there had been some change in [Nicole's] status but on others’ complaints about the school’s well-considered decision, constituted discrimination based on [Nicole's] sexual orientation."

The court prohibited the district from barring transgender students access to bathrooms consistent with their gender identity. Maines and her family were awarded $75,000.

The sole dissenter, Judge Andrew Mead, agreed that Maines had been unfairly treated but disagreed that the Maine Human Rights Act protected her, and instead said he would prefer the legislature to amend the act to cover transgender individuals. In 2019, Governor Janet Mills signed L.D. 1701 to formally add gender identity to the protections of the Maine Human Rights Act.

== Impact ==
Doe v. Regional School Unit 26 was the first case in which the Maine Supreme Judicial Court determined how the Maine Human Rights Act would apply to transgender students. Significantly, it was also the first case in which any U.S. state supreme court held that transgender students had the right to use the bathroom of their gender identity.

Maines is now an actress and a transgender rights activist.
