= Francis W. Sullivan =

American judge (1894–1967)

Francis William Sullivan (July 15, 1894 – January 7, 1967) of Portland, Maine, was a justice of the Maine Supreme Judicial Court from October 4, 1956 to July 10, 1965.

Born in Portland, Sullivan graduated from Portland High School. He later studied at College of the Holy Cross, before graduating from Georgetown University, University of Pennsylvania, and Harvard Law School. During World War I, he served as an intelligence officer in the United States Army.

After graduating from Harvard, he went into private practice, before being appointed to the Maine Superior Court in 1949 by Governor Frederick G. Payne. A Roman Catholic, He and his wife had a private audience with Pope Pius XII in 1950. Sullivan was appointed to the Supreme Court in 1956 by Governor Edmund Muskie. He was the first Roman Catholic member of the Republican Party to be appointed to the court. In 1957, he proposed a substantial revision of the Maine Rules of Civil Procedure, which was adopted by the state legislature in 1959.

Sullivan died at Mercy Hospital in Portland at the age of 72.

Political offices
Preceded by Robert B. Williamson	Justice of the Maine Supreme Judicial Court; 1956–1965	Succeeded by Armand A. Dufresne Jr.
