= Adams ex rel. Kasper v. School Board of St. Johns County, Florida =

2022 Florida court case on transgender students' rights to access bathrooms

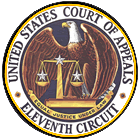
- Court: 11th Circuit Court of Appeals
- Decided: December 2022

Case history
- Appealed from: U.S.D.C., M.D. Fla.

Court membership
- Judges sitting: William Pryor, Chief Judge, and Charles R. Wilson, Adalberto Jordan, Robin S. Rosenbaum, Jill A. Pryor, Kevin Newsom, Elizabeth L. Branch, Britt Grant, Robert J. Luck, Barbara Lagoa, and Andrew L. Brasher, Circuit Judges

Case opinions
- Majority: Lagoa, joined by William Pryor, Newsom, Branch, Grant, Luck, and Brasher
- Concurrence: Lagoa
- Dissent: Wilson
- Dissent: Jordan, joined by Wilson, Rosenbaum
- Dissent: Rosenbaum
- Dissent: Jill Pryor, joined by Rosenbaum (as to Parts I, II, III.A, III.B., III.D., and IV)

Adams ex rel. Kasper v. School Board of St. Johns County, Florida is a court case from the United States Court of Appeals for the Eleventh Circuit addressing whether schools can separate bathrooms on the basis of biological sex, and thus refuse to allow transgender students to use bathrooms that match their gender identity. The case was filed by Erica Adams Kasper on behalf of Drew Adams, a minor at the time, against the school board of St. Johns County, Florida, in the United States District Court for the Middle District of Florida. The lawsuit was filed after Adams was denied access to the boys' bathrooms at Nease High School. Kasper claimed that Adams's rights were being violated on account of discriminated on the basis of sex, which is prohibited by Title IX of the Education Amendments of 1972, and a violation of the equal protection of the laws under the Fourteenth Amendment.

Adams has been using the boys' bathrooms for the six weeks of freshman year when, following an anonymous complaint from two female students, Adams was informed that only the use of the gender-neutral bathrooms or the girls' bathrooms would be acceptable. The plaintiff argued that Title IX protections encompass gender identity, and thus policies or rules governing schools may not turn on one's sex as assigned at birth.

Kasper was represented by the LGBTQ rights law organization Lambda Legal, and was supported in amicus briefs by over fifty organizations, including the National Women's Law Center and the Anti-Defamation League. ADL's brief made the argument that the school board's "protective concerns" were invalid because they were based on discriminatory stereotypes and that there was no evidence that use of the restroom corresponding to gender identity in the county's schools caused any injury or harm to students. A critic of the ruling argued that sex and gender identity should be differentiated and that Adams's right therefore would not fall under Title IX protections. St. Johns County School Board was represented by Sniffen & Spellman, P.A., a Florida law firm that specializes in civil rights and education law issues.

== Ruling by the District Court ==
A bench trial was held December 11–13, 2017 and closing arguments were heard on February 16, 2018, before U.S. District Court Judge Timothy J. Corrigan. On July 26, 2018, Judge Corrigan issued an opinion finding for Kasper, holding that Adams's rights had been violated and that the school policy violated the Equal Protection clause of the Fourteenth Amendment and Title IX of the Education Amendments of 1972.

== Ruling by a three-judge panel of the Eleventh Circuit ==
The school board appealed the ruling to a three-judge panel of the 11th Circuit Court of Appeals. On August 7, 2020, the opinion of Judge Beverly B. Martin, joined by Judge Jill A. Pryor, again decided in favor of Adams. Judge Martin ruled that a public school may not "harm transgender students by establishing arbitrary, separate rules for their restroom use." Chief Judge William H. Pryor Jr. dissented, arguing that the discrimination was on the basis of sex, not on transgender status, which is valid under Title IX when creating sex-segregated bathrooms. In response to a motion for reconsideration, the panel issued a new opinion on July 14, 2021, limited to the equal protection claim under the Fourteenth Amendment, without dealing with the Title IX claim. On August 23, 2021, the 11th Circuit voted to vacate the panel opinion and rehear the case en banc.

== En banc ruling by the Eleventh Circuit ==
On December 30, 2022, the en banc 11th Circuit issued an opinion overruling the district court's opinion in a 7–4 decision. Judge Logoa wrote both the majority opinion and also a special concurring opinion. Dissents were written by Judges Wilson, Jordan, Rosenbaum, and Pryor.

In the majority opinion Judge Lagoa wrote "Title IX allows schools to provide separate bathrooms on the basis of biological sex."

Judge Wilson wrote that the bathroom policy was discriminatory because "[u]nderlying this sex-assigned-at-matriculation bathroom policy, however, is the presumption that biological sex is accurately determinable at birth and that it is a static or permanent biological determination."

Judge Jill Pryor wrote that "gender identity is an immutable, biological component of a person's sex" and that "birth-assigned sex and chromosomal structure take a back seat in determining a person's sex when that person's gender identity diverges from those two components." Pryor also wrote that

[t]he term "biological sex," as used by the School District in its bathroom policy, thus does not include many of the biological components that together make up an individual's sex as understood by medical science, including gender identity. Nor does the term "biological sex," when used to mean only sex assigned at birth, account for the reality that the biological components of sex in an individual might diverge. And the term fails to account for the primacy of two biological components in particular, gender identity and neurological sex, when such a divergence occurs. Put simply, the term "biological sex" as used by the School District is at odds with medical science.

Judge Jordan wrote that the policy "can only be justified by administrative convenience. And when intermediate scrutiny applies, administrative convenience is an insufficient justification for a gender-based classification."

== See also ==
- Doe v. Clenchy
- G.G. v. Gloucester County School Board
- Bathroom bills
- Coy Mathis bathroom case
- Price Waterhouse v. Hopkins
