= Sidney W. Wernick =

American judge (1913–1995)

Sidney William Wernick (November 29, 1913 – September 22, 1995), of Portland, Maine, was a justice of the Maine Supreme Judicial Court from September 30, 1970 to August 24, 1981.

Wernick was born in Philadelphia, Pennsylvania. He graduated from the University of Pennsylvania (BA, MA), Harvard University (PhD), and Harvard Law School (JD). After receiving his law degree, he moved to Portland to start a private practice. In 1956, he appointed to the Portland Municipal Court by Governor Edmund Muskie. He was nominated to the Maine Superior Court by Governor Kenneth M. Curtis in 1969. The next year, he was nominated by Governor Curtis to a seat on the state Supreme Court vacated by the elevation of Armand A. Dufresne Jr. to chief justice, following the retirement of chief justice Robert B. Williamson.

He resigned in July 1981, at the age of 67.

He died in 1995 in Portland.

Political offices
Preceded by Armand A. Dufresne Jr.	Justice of the Maine Supreme Judicial Court; 1970–1981	Succeeded by Elmer H. Violette
