= G.G. v. Gloucester County School Board =

U.S. court case dealing with transgender rights

- Court: United States Court of Appeals for the Fourth Circuit
- Full case name: Gavin Grimm v. Gloucester County School Board
- Argued: May 26 2020
- Decided: August 26 2020
- Citation: 972 F.3d 586 (4th Cir. 2020)

Case opinions
- Majority: Floyd, joined by Wynn
- Concurrence: Wynn
- Dissent: Niemeyer

G.G. v. Gloucester County School Board (later named Grimm v. Gloucester County School Board (Note: At the time the case was heard, the plaintiff was a minor and was listed as G.G. in original case documents, but was decided at the 4th Circuit under Grimm)) was a court case dealing with transgender rights in the United States. The case involved a transgender boy attending a Virginia high school, who sued the local school board after he was forced to use girls' restrooms based on his assigned gender under the school board's policy. While the Fourth Circuit ruled in favor of the student based on Obama administration policy related to Title IX protections, the election of Donald Trump changed the underlying policy. A pending hearing before the Supreme Court of the United States was vacated and the case was sent back to the Fourth Circuit.

Due to recent case law, including the Supreme Court decision in Bostock v. Clayton County, the Fourth Circuit ruled again in favor of the student; the Supreme Court refused to hear the case by denying certiorari in 2021, allowing the Fourth Circuit's judgment to stand.

== Legal background ==
Title IX of the Education Amendments of 1972 prohibits discrimination "on the basis of sex" in educational programs and activities that receive financial assistance from the federal government. Congress left enforcement of this to the executive branch, which by 1980, fell under the Office for Civil Rights (OCR) within the Department of Education.

During the Obama administration, the OCR took the position that Title IX protects LGBT students from harassment on the basis of sex stereotypes. Subsequently, OCR brought a number of successful enforcement actions under Title IX on behalf of students who were subject to harassment or discrimination on the basis of their gender identity, gender expression, or failure to conform to gender stereotypes. Eight of the cases were settled in favor of the students. Several private lawsuits were brought as well on similar grounds. Further, in January 2015, the Department of Education also issued guidance to all federally-funded schools, known as the Ferg-Cadima letter, that stated that "a school generally must treat transgender students consistent with their gender identity."

== Case background ==
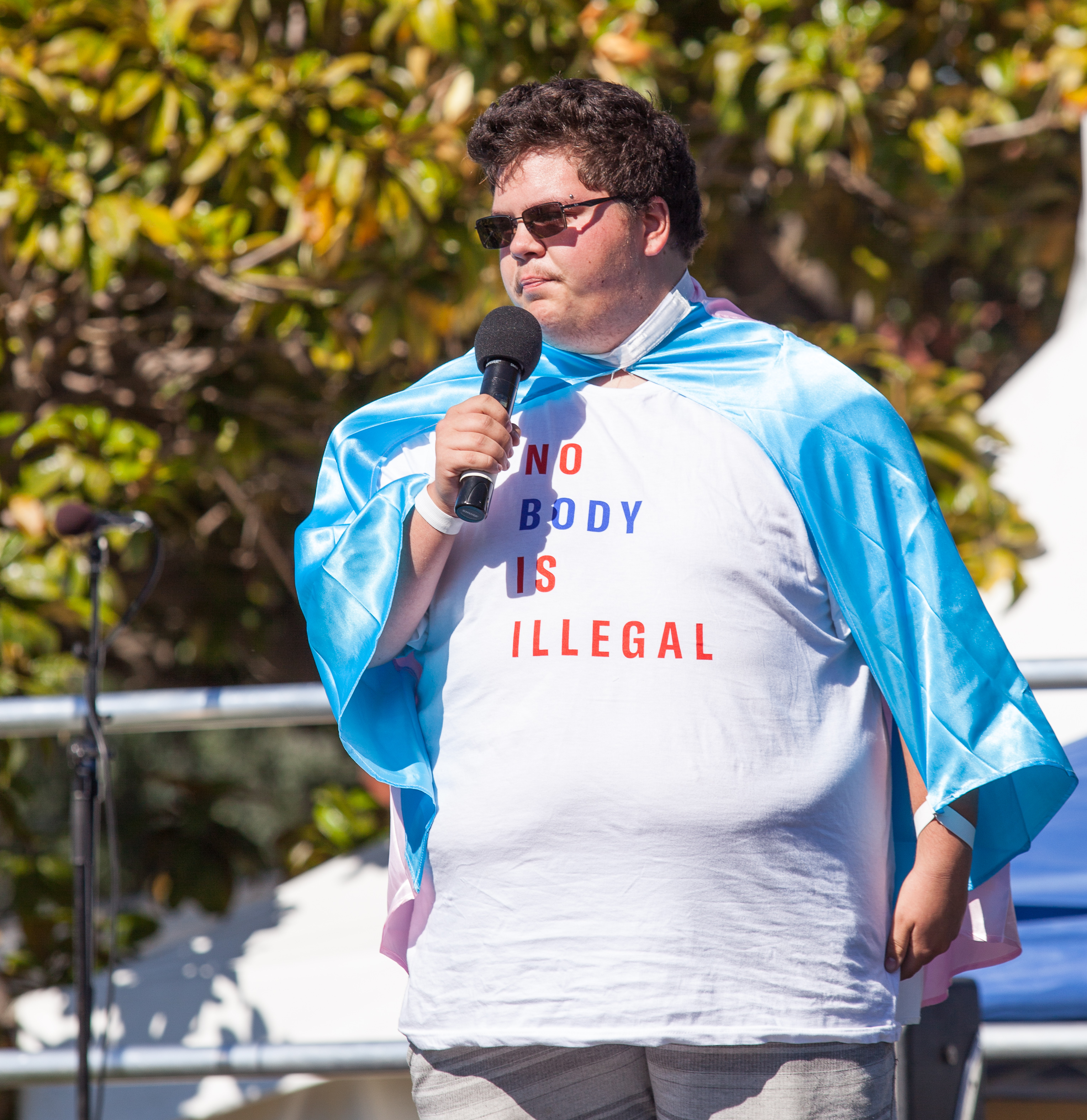
Gavin Grimm, wearing a trans pride flag cape and a T-shirt reading "No Body Is Illegal", speaks on stage at the 2018 Trans March San Francisco.

Gavin Grimm is a transgender man who was assigned female at birth and was perceived as a girl through middle school; in high school, he began to present himself as a boy and consequently began using the boys' restroom at the school. Several parents of other students complained to the Gloucester County school board; speakers addressing the board used derogatory terms and name-calling at a public hearing.

The school board passed a regulation that access to changing rooms and bathrooms "shall be limited to the corresponding biological genders, and students with gender identity issues shall be provided an alternative appropriate private facility". When he refused to use the girls' bathroom, Grimm was offered the use of some broom closets that had been retrofitted into unisex bathrooms and that no other student was required to use. Grimm refused to use those as well, opting to use a bathroom in the school nurse's office.

After the regulation was adopted, Grimm continued to face gender-based discrimination by the school board even after he began hormone therapy, underwent reconstructive chest surgery, and received an official Virginia state I.D. card supplementing his Virginia birth certificate and listing his gender as male.

== Initial hearings ==
Grimm, under these conditions, found himself the subject of ridicule by the other students, and through his parent, sued the school board on grounds of Title IX discrimination and the Equal Protection Clause in June 2015 in the United States District Court for the Eastern District of Virginia. Grimm obtained legal representation from the American Civil Liberties Union and referred the case to the DOJ. The federal government agreed to intervene in the case on Grimm's behalf, writing to the court that Title IX "prohibits discrimination based on sex, including gender identity, transgender status, and nonconformity to sex stereotypes".

In legal court proceedings, Grimm asserted he had been allowed to use the boys' bathroom for seven weeks without incident and had faced gender-based discrimination after the regulation of the Gloucester County School Board was implemented. Prior to the hearing, on December 18, 2014, the ACLU had already filed a complaint with the U.S. Department of Justice (DOJ), based on the nature of the school board's restroom policy. Despite Grimm's case mirroring similar cases that the OCR had been pursuing and the existing guidance from the Department of Education, Judge Robert G. Doumar of the District Court dismissed the suit. In his ruling, Judge Doumar held that Title IX's operative provision should be read narrowly to cover discrimination on the basis of genetic "sex" only, and not gender identity or expression. Doumar also held that on the basis that under Title IX, the school had provided comparable facilities as directed under 34 U.S.C. § 106.33. The court also rejected Grimm's request for a preliminary injunction to use the boys' restroom while litigation proceeded. During the proceedings in the District Court, Judge Doumar made a number of idiosyncratic statements from the bench, saying that being transgender is a "mental disorder", delivering off-topic criticism of the federal government on the issues of marijuana enforcement and sanctuary cities, and explaining that Grimm is a female who "wants to be male". In reviewing the case, the Court of Appeals criticized Judge Doumar's conduct in the courtroom, writing that his "extraneous remarks [and] suppositions ... marred the hearing".

Grimm appealed the dismissal to the United States Court of Appeals for the Fourth Circuit. The Fourth Circuit, in a 2–1 decision in April 2016, overruled the District Court and remanded the case back to the District Court. The majority held that the District Court had ignored the guidance in the Ferg-Cadima letter from the Department of Education, the controlling agency in Title IX protections in the context of the Chevron and Auer deferences, in dismissing the case, as well as to reconsider the preliminary injunction on Grimm's use of the boys' restroom. The school board moved for rehearing en banc, but the Fourth Circuit declined to rehear the case. In June 2016, the District Court granted the preliminary injunction to allow Grimm to use the boys' restroom.

The Gloucester County school board petitioned to the Supreme Court. The school board raised questions on the Auer deference that the Fourth Circuit had relied on in giving weight to the Department of Education's interpretation of Title IX and via the unpublished Ferg-Cadima letter, and to whether the Department of Education's interpretation of comparable facilities or that of 34 U.S.C. § 106.33 had prevalence. The Supreme Court, in a 5–3 vote in August 2016, agreed to put a stay on the District Court's preliminary injunction, with Justice Stephen Breyer joining the conservative sides as to "courtesy" to maintain the status quo while the Court decided if they would take the case. Subsequently, in October, the Court granted certification of the case, with the oral arguments later to have been heard on March 28, 2017.

Shortly upon taking office in January 2017, President Donald Trump took steps to reject past guidance set by the Obama administration related to transgender rights. On February 22, 2017, Trump and Education Secretary Betsy DeVos formally reversed past Department of Education guidance including the Ferg-Cadima letter on claims the regulation was not based on a sound legal foundation, allowing schools to establish their own policies as necessary under Title IX. Lawyers in Grimm's case recognized this drastically affected the legal underpinning of the case though had expected to be able to still argue in Grimm's favor on other points, but on March 6, 2017, the Supreme Court vacated their case as a result of the change in the administration's policy, vacated the Fourth Circuit's prior ruling, and remanded the case back to the lower courts to be retried under the current interpretation of Title IX protections.

== Rehearings ==
Since 2017, Grimm had graduated from high school as well as undergoing reassignment surgery to be recognized by the state as male, and had amended the complaint to focus on the harm to his constitutional rights at school and the impact of intervening case law. Judge Arenda Wright Allen of the United States District Court for the Eastern District of Virginia denied the Gloucester County School Board's motion to dismiss the case in May 2018, and ruled that Grimm had a valid claim of discrimination under Title IX of the Education Amendments of 1972, as well as the U.S. Constitution's equal protection clause. The District Court rehearings were held in July 2019. The District Court this time found for both of Grimm's claims on Title IX and Equal Protection Clause in August 2019, asserting that Grimm had faced emotional harm from using the restroom assigned to his biological sex. Grimm was awarded attorney's fees, court expenses, and a nominal $1 in damages, and the court issued a permanent injunction requiring the school board to update Grimm's official school records to reflect his gender identity.

The school board appealed to the Fourth Circuit, which upheld the District Court's decision on August 26, 2020, on a 2–1 majority. The majority opinion was guided heavily by the Supreme Court decision Bostock v. Clayton County which had determined that in Title VII of the Civil Rights Act of 1964 for employment discrimination, "on the basis of sex" includes protection for sexual orientation and gender identity.

The Supreme Court denied certiorari on June 28, 2021, with Justices Clarence Thomas and Samuel Alito dissenting, leaving the decision of the Fourth Circuit intact. In August 2021, a settlement was announced under which the district agreed to pay the student $1.3 million for his legal fees.

== Impact and similar cases ==
G.G. v. Gloucester County was one of several cases over the past decade where students challenged school policies that required transgender students to use of bathrooms based on legal sex or sex assigned at birth, instead of in line with their gender identity. The question was decided by the Maine Supreme Judicial Court in 2013 in favor of a transgender girl in Doe v. Regional School Unit 26. In 2022, the 11th Circuit found in favor of a Florida school's decision to restrict bathroom usage on the basis of biological sex, in Adams v. The School Board of St. Johns County, Florida.

In some states, legislatures have been influenced by Christian right organizations such as the Alliance Defending Freedom to pass "bathroom bills" prohibiting transgender students from using the school bathrooms aligning with their gender identity. South Carolina passed one such bill in June 2024, stipulating that schools must require students to use bathrooms based on their birth gender or lose a portion of their funding. A transgender male student in the Berkeley County School District sued the district and state over the law, citing a recently-enacted rule from the Biden administration that enforced transgender rights under Title IX and made such bathroom bills illegal due to being discriminatory. Within the second Trump administration, the Biden Title IX rule was reversed, but the Fourth Circuit still ruled in the student's favor in August 2025 based on their ruling from Grimm. South Carolina filed an emergency petition to the Supreme Court, stating that the Supreme Court's more recent ruling in United States v. Skrmetti, where the majority had ruled that a Tennessee law banning puberty blockers and hormone therapy for minors on a rational basis review that the law was aimed at age and medical needs and not sex discrimination, overrode Grimm.

As of 2024, in the years following his court case, Grimm has experienced post-traumatic stress disorder, poverty, and housing instability.

== See also ==
- Transgender rights in the United States
- Doe v. Regional School Unit 26
- Adams v. The School Board of St. Johns County, Florida
- Coy Mathis bathroom case
- Bathroom bills
