= Rick E. Lawrence =

American judge (born 1955)

Rick Lawrence

Associate Justice of the Maine Supreme Judicial Court
- Incumbent
- Assumed office May 4, 2022
- Appointed by: Janet Mills
- Preceded by: Ellen Gorman

Personal details
- Born: November 4, 1955 (age 69); Great Barrington, Massachusetts, U.S.
- Education: Yale University (BA); Harvard University (JD)

Rick E. Lawrence (born November 4, 1955) is an American lawyer who has served as an associate justice of the Maine Supreme Judicial Court since 2022.

== Education ==
Lawrence received his Bachelor of Arts from Yale University in 1977 and his Juris Doctor from Harvard Law School in 1986.

== Career ==
Prior to his judicial service, Lawrence was an attorney and vice president and managing counsel at Unum and as an associate at Pierce Atwood.

=== Judicial service ===
Lawrence served as a state district judge from April 5, 2000 to May 4, 2022. He was first nominated by governor Angus King and then renominated by governor John Baldacci, governor Paul LePage and Governor Mills. He served as deputy chief judge since April 2020.

=== Maine Supreme Judicial Court ===
On March 7, 2022, governor Janet Mills nominated Lawrence to serve as an associate justice of the Maine Supreme Judicial Court to the seat to be vacated by Justice Ellen Gorman who announced her intent to retire in January 2021. On April 8, 2022, his nomination was unanimously reported out of the judiciary committee. On April 12, 2022, his nomination was unanimously confirmed by the Maine Senate. Lawrence was sworn into office on May 4, 2022. He is the first African American justice on the high court.

Legal offices
Preceded by Ellen Gorman	Associate Justice of the Maine Supreme Judicial Court; 2022–present	Incumbent
