= Julia M. Lipez =

American judge (born 1980)

Julia Lipez

Associate Justice of the Maine Supreme Judicial Court
- Incumbent
- Assumed office March 28, 2025
- Appointed by: Janet Mills
- Preceded by: Joseph Jabar

Personal details
- Born: Julia Martha Lipez; 1980 (age 45–46) Portland, Maine, U.S.
- Spouse: Nolan Ladislav Reichl
- Relatives: Kermit Lipez (father)
- Education: Amherst College (BA); Stanford University (JD)

Julia Martha Lipez (born 1980) is an American lawyer who has served as an associate justice of the Maine Supreme Judicial Court since 2025. She served as a justice of the Maine Superior Court from 2022 to 2025. President Joe Biden nominated her to serve as a United States circuit judge of the United States Court of Appeals for the First Circuit, but her nomination never received a vote before the U.S. Senate.

== Education ==
Lipez received a Bachelor of Arts, magna cum laude, from Amherst College in 2002 and Juris Doctor, with distinction, from Stanford Law School in 2006.

== Career ==
From 2006 to 2007, she served as a law clerk for Judge Diana Gribbon Motz of the U.S. Court of Appeals for the Fourth Circuit. From 2007 to 2011, she served as an associate and then a senior associate at Wilmer Cutler Pickering Hale and Dorr in New York City. From 2011 to 2022, Lipez worked as an assistant United States attorney in the U.S. Attorney's Office for the District of Maine, where she served as appellate chief from 2019 to 2022. From 2022 to 2025, she served as a justice on the Maine Superior Court.

=== Failed nomination to the federal court of appeals ===
On May 23, 2024, President Joe Biden announced his intent to nominate Lipez to serve as a United States circuit judge of the United States Court of Appeals for the First Circuit. On June 4, 2024, her nomination was sent to the Senate. President Biden nominated Lipez to the seat being vacated by Judge William J. Kayatta Jr., who assumed senior status on October 31, 2024. On June 20, 2024, a hearing on her nomination was held before the Senate Judiciary Committee. During her confirmation hearing, she was questioned by Republican senators over her sentencing in cases involving abuse against children. These sentencing decisions included suspending half of a sentence for an adult man who was found guilty of sexually abusing a 4-year-old and a 9-year-old child and suspending six years of a 10-year sentence for a woman who allowed drug trafficking operations to occur in her home, leading to her 14-month-old child's death from fentanyl exposure. On August 1, 2024, her nomination was reported out of committee by an 11–10 party-line vote. In a deal struck between Senate Democrats and Republicans, Lipez's nomination did not go to a vote before the full Senate. On January 3, 2025, her nomination was returned to the president.

=== Maine Supreme Judicial Court ===
On February 28, 2025, Governor Janet Mills nominated Lipez to serve as a justice of the Maine Supreme Judicial Court. She was nominated to fill the vacancy left by resignation of Justice Joseph Jabar. She was unanimously voted out of the judiciary committee. On March 20, 2025, she was confirmed by the Maine Senate by a 34–1 vote. She was sworn into office on March 28, by Governor Mills.

== Personal life ==
She has been married to her husband, Nolan Ladislav Reichl, since 2010. She is the daughter of Judge Kermit Lipez.

Legal offices
Preceded by Joseph Jabar	Associate Justice of the Maine Supreme Judicial Court; 2025–present	Incumbent
