= H. Chapman Rose =

American lawyer (1907–1990)

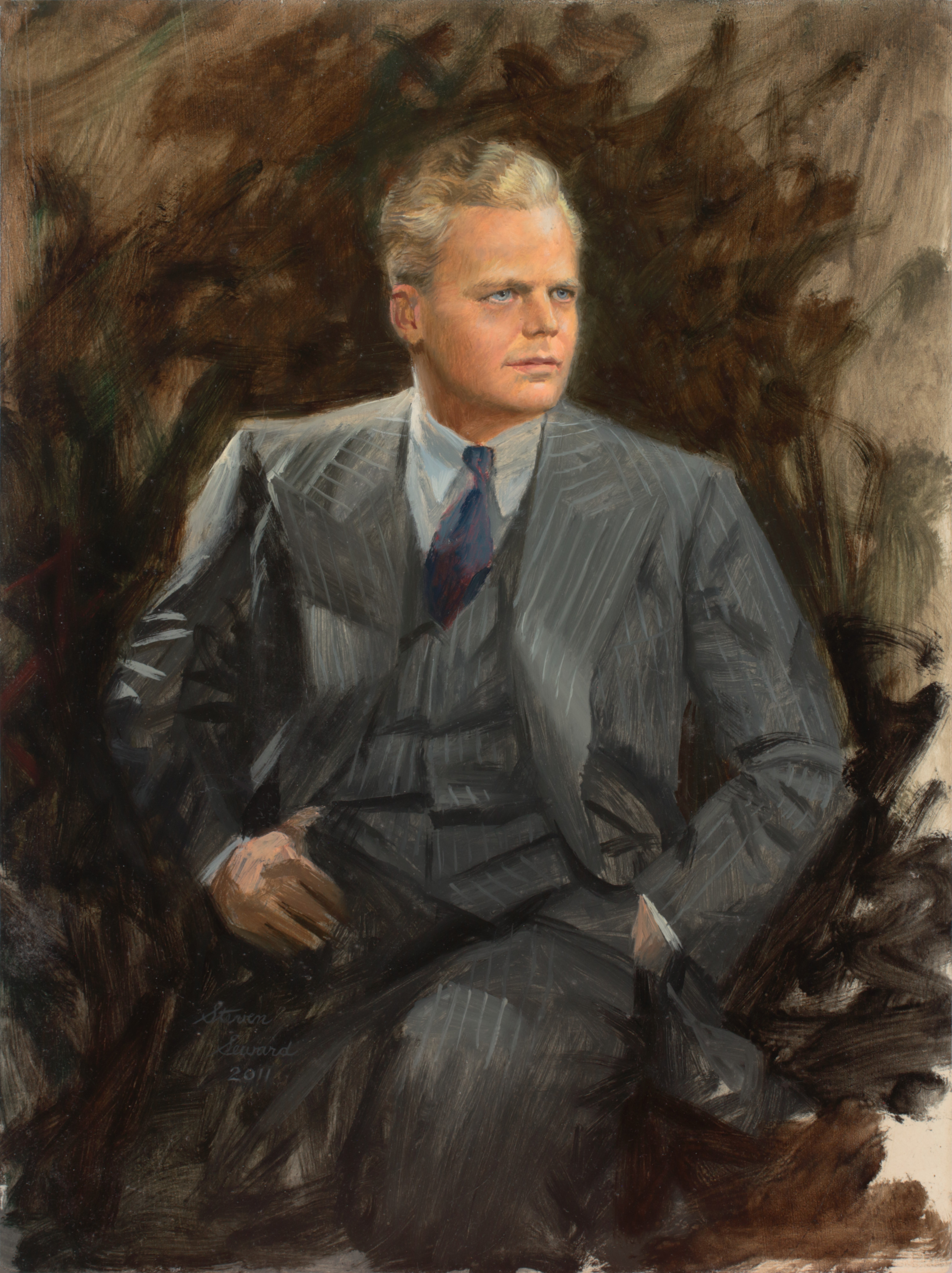

Undersecretary of the Treasury
- In office August 3, 1955 – January 31, 1956
- Preceded by: Marion B. Folsom
- Succeeded by: Fred C. Scribner Jr.

Personal details
- Born: Horace Chapman Rose; February 11, 1907 Columbus, Ohio, US
- Died: February 17, 1990 (aged 83) Washington, D.C., US
- Spouse: Katherine Cast (m. 1938–1990)
- Children: 1

Horace Chapman Rose (February 11, 1907 – February 17, 1990) was an American lawyer who served as undersecretary of the United States Treasury from 1955 to 1956 under President Dwight D. Eisenhower.

== Early life and education ==
Rose was born February 11, 1907, in Columbus, Ohio, the sun of Henry N. Rose and Grace Chapman Rose. He studied at Columbus Academy and the Hotchkiss School, graduating from the latter in 1924. In 1928, he graduated from Princeton University with a degree in history. In 1931, he received his law degree from Harvard Law School, and he passed the Ohio bar in 1932.

== Career ==
In the Supreme Court of the United States' 1931 term, Rose served as the final law clerk to Justice Oliver Wendell Holmes Jr. Rose's first job after passing the Ohio bar was at the Cleveland, Ohio-based law firm Tolles Hogsett & Ginn, where he eventually became a partner. During World War II, Rose served in the United States Army, where he served on the legal staff of General Lucius D. Clay. He retired from the Army as a colonel and was awarded the Legion of Merit.

In 1946, President Harry S. Truman appointed Rose the director of the Office of Contract Settlement in the United States Department of War. He subsequently worked at the law firm Jones Day Cockley & Reavis, where he was a partner in their Cleveland office from 1949 to 1953, when he was named assistant undersecretary of the Treasury by President Eisenhower. He was elevated to undersecretary of the Treasury in 1955, replacing Marion B. Folsom. Rose remained undersecretary of the Treasury until 1956, when he resigned to return to practicing law. He went on to serve as a partner at Jones Day's Cleveland office from 1956 to 1974, and as its national managing partner from 1974 to 1976. He retired from Jones Day in 1983.

Rose was long active in supporting the Republican Party in Ohio, and donated over $10,000 to the 1972 reelection campaign of President Richard Nixon. During Nixon's second term, Rose represented the President on income tax issues.

== Personal life and death ==
On October 1, 1938, Rose married Katherine Cast, with whom he had a son, Jonathan Chapman Rose. He died on February 17, 1990, aged 83, at Sibley Hospital in Washington, D.C., from emphysema..
