= Armand A. Dufresne Jr. =

American judge (1909–1994)

Armand Alphee Dufresne Jr. (January 17, 1909 – April 19, 1994), of Lewiston, Maine, was an associate justice of the Maine Supreme Judicial Court from August 25, 1965, to September 1970, and chief justice from then until his retirement on September 16, 1977. Dufresne was "educated at the Seminary of St. Charles-Borromee in Sherbrooke, Quebec, and at the Montreal Seminary of Philosophy, and received a law degree from the Boston College Law School in 1935.

Dufresne entered the practice of law in Lewiston in 1936, and was Androscoggin county attorney for four years before becoming a judge of probate in that county, where he served for 12 years prior to his election to the state supreme court. In September 1970, Governor Kenneth M. Curtis elevated Dufresne to the office of chief justice, following the retirement of Chief Justice Robert B. Williamson.

Dufresne married Colette Thibault, with whom he had three children.

Political offices
Preceded by Randolph Weatherbee	Associate Justice of the Maine Supreme Judicial Court; 1965–1970	Succeeded by Sidney W. Wernick
Preceded by Robert B. Williamson	Chief Justice of the Maine Supreme Judicial Court; 1970–1977	Succeeded by Vincent L. McKusick
