= Andrew M. Horton =

American judge (born 1949)

Andrew Horton

Associate Justice of the Maine Supreme Judicial Court
- In office February 4, 2020 – November 14, 2025
- Appointed by: Janet Mills
- Preceded by: Donald G. Alexander
- Succeeded by: Chris Taub

Personal details
- Born: Andrew Marcus Horton; August 28, 1949 (age 76) Washington, D.C., U.S.
- Spouse: Peggy McGehee
- Relatives: Ralph McGehee (father-in-law)
- Education: Harvard University (BA); Georgetown University (JD)

Andrew Marcus Horton (born August 28, 1949) is an American lawyer who has served an associate justice of the Maine Supreme Judicial Court since 2020.

== Education ==
Horton earned a Bachelor of Arts from Harvard University in 1972 and a Juris Doctor from Georgetown University Law Center in 1977.

== Career ==
Horton has over 42 years of experience as an attorney, including 21 years in law practice and 21 years as a judge.

=== State judicial service ===
He was first appointed to the Maine District Court in 1999 by Governor Angus King, then to the Maine Superior Court in January 2007 by Governor John Baldacci. He was renominated in January 2014 by Governor Paul LePage.

=== Maine Supreme Judicial Court ===
On January 6, 2020, Governor Janet Mills announced the nomination of Horton to the seat to be vacated by Donald G. Alexander who retired at the end of January 2020. On January 30, 2020, his nomination was approved by the Judiciary Committee of the Maine Legislature by a 11–0 vote. On February 4, 2020, he was confirmed unanimously by the Maine Senate.

Legal offices
Preceded by Donald G. Alexander	Associate Justice of the Maine Supreme Judicial Court; 2020–2025	Succeeded by Chris Taub
