= Christopher Taub (judge) =

American attorney and judge

Chris Taub

Associate Justice of the Maine Supreme Court
- Incumbent
- Assumed office April 6, 2026
- Appointed by: Janet Mills
- Preceded by: Andrew Horton

Personal details
- Born: 1983 or 1984 (age 42–43)
- Education: Cornell University (BA); Boston University (JD)

Christopher Taub is an American attorney and judge best known for serving as an Associate Justice of the Maine Supreme Court, a role he was confirmed to on March 31, 2026. He previously served as the Chief Deputy Attorney General of Maine, and worked in the Attorney General's office from 1999 to 2026.

== Biography ==
Taub attended Cornell University for his bachelor's degree and earned his JD from Boston University.

He worked in the Maine Attorney General's office starting in 1999 as a trial attorney, rising to the position of Chief Deputy Attorney General. He also served as Chief of the Litigation Division during Janet Mills's tenure as Attorney General. He represented Maine in several notable cases, including Carson v. Makin, where he argued the case in front of the Supreme Court of the United States, and also worked on cases involving transgender people in sports and gun control.

He was nominated by Janet Mills, who had become Governor, to become an Associate Justice of the Maine Supreme Judicial Court on March 13, 2026, with Mills citing his professionalism and experience.

He was approved by committee on March 27, 2026 and confirmed by the full Maine Senate on March 31, 2026. Mills stated he will take office in the subsequent few weeks.

Legal offices
Preceded by Andrew Horton	Associate Justice of the Maine Supreme Court; 2026–present	Incumbent
