= James L. Reid =

American politician

James L. Reid (December 31, 1907 – January 31, 1985) was an American politician and jurist from Maine. Reid, a Republican from Hallowell, served three terms in the Maine House of Representatives (1950-1956). During his final term, Reid served as House Majority Leader.

Reid served as a Justice of the Maine Superior Court from 1962 to 1975.
