= John Salvi =

American anti-abortion terrorist

John C. Salvi III
- Born: March 2, 1972; Virginia, U.S.
- Died: November 29, 1996 (aged 24); MCI Cedar Junction, Walpole, Massachusetts, U.S.
- Cause of death: Suicide by asphyxiation
- Status: Deceased
- Motive: Anti-abortion extremism
- Convictions: First degree murder (2 counts); Armed assault with intent to murder (5 counts)
- Penalty: Life imprisonment without parole

John C. Salvi III (March 2, 1972 – November 29, 1996) was an American anti-abortion extremist who carried out fatal shootings at two abortion facilities in Brookline, Massachusetts, on December 30, 1994. The shootings killed two and wounded five. His insanity defense was unsuccessful, leading to convictions on two counts of murder and a life sentence without parole. He died in 1996, with his death officially ruled a suicide in his prison cell.

== Brookline shootings ==
1994 Brookline shootings
- Location: Brookline, Massachusetts, U.S.
- Date: December 30, 1994
- Weapon: Ruger 10/22
- Deaths: 2
- Injuries: 5

In the mid-morning of December 30, 1994, John Salvi walked into the Planned Parenthood clinic on Beacon Street in Brookline, Massachusetts, carrying a black duffle bag. In the waiting room, he took a modified .22-caliber Ruger 10/22 semi-automatic rifle from the bag and wordlessly opened fire. A medical assistant, Arjana Agrawal, was hit in the abdomen. Salvi then shot at receptionist Shannon Lowney in the neck, killing her instantly. Approximately forty people were in the room during the assault; of these, five were wounded, including several men who were accompanying women seeking abortions. Salvi shot indiscriminately, including at those protesting outside.

Salvi left Planned Parenthood and drove west on Beacon Street to the Preterm Health Services office. Preterm was approximately two miles away and Salvi drove past another abortion facility to get there but did not stop. He asked receptionist Lee Ann Nichols, "Is this Preterm?" When she said yes, Salvi pulled out a hunting rifle and shot Nichols point blank.

As he had at Planned Parenthood, Salvi continued to fire. Among those injured was part-time security guard Richard J. Seron and another employee, Jane Sauer. Seron returned fire. Seron himself was shot four times in the arms, and once in the left hand. Salvi then dropped the black duffle bag, which contained a gun, receipts from a gun dealer in Hampton, New Hampshire, and 700 rounds of ammunition. He then fled in his Audi. Police were able to identify him from the gun shop receipt in the abandoned bag.

The day before the shootings, Salvi practiced shooting at a firing range. He cut his hair immediately after the shootings to alter his appearance.

Salvi was captured in Norfolk, Virginia, the day after the shootings, after firing over a dozen bullets into the Hillcrest Clinic. The clinic was open at the time; however, Salvi was captured before making his way up to the second floor where Hillcrest was located.

== Trial ==
On February 5, 1996, Salvi was put on trial in a Massachusetts state court for the murders of Lee Ann Nichols and Shannon Lowney. Barbara A. Dortch-Okara presided over the case. The defense argued that Salvi suffered from schizophrenia, with several expert witnesses including forensic psychiatrist Phillip J. Resnick testifying that Salvi exhibited schizophrenic behavior and was not competent to stand trial.

Salvi frequently disrupted the proceedings by yelling out a religious philosophy in the middle of the trial. The philosophy seemed to be centered around a belief that the Mafia, the Ku Klux Klan, the Freemasons, and others were persecuting Catholics. His defense attorneys introduced sections of a long, rambling diary Salvi kept to bolster their claims of mental illness. During a competency hearing, Salvi submitted a rambling document in which he expressed a desire for the death penalty.

The defense argued that Salvi told his parents that "the mafia and KKK are out to get me". Salvi's mother, Anne Marie Salvi, testified that her son had told her that he "was the thief on the cross with Jesus." A state police detective who sat with the Lowney family during the trial said because it "was clear that Salvi was mentally ill" that the Lowney family almost had empathy for him.

The prosecution used the testimony of Bridgewater State Hospital psychologist Joel Haycock, who spent eleven days with Salvi out of his sixty days under observation. Haycock determined that during the time of his observation of Salvi in a hospital setting, Salvi had no hallucinations, could speak in a non-digressive linear way, and was capable of understanding guilt. Haycock observed no signs of psychotic disorder during his time with Salvi. Haycock also asserted that Salvi had no mental disease at the time of the crime and was competent to stand trial.

On March 19, 1996, Salvi was found guilty of two counts of first-degree murder and five counts of armed assault with intent to murder. He was sentenced to life in prison without the possibility of parole. Since abortion clinics are also protected under federal law, and Salvi had traveled across state lines between the shootings, he could have been put on trial in federal court, but the U.S. attorney declined to pursue the case after Salvi had been convicted in state court.

== Mental illness ==
Salvi had long shown signs of mental illness. Despite erratic outbursts, difficulty living alone, earlier threats of violence, and the possibility that he was involved in an arson in Florida, neither the anti-abortion protesters who saw Salvi become distraught at their vigils, nor his family who had witnessed signs of his illness, took steps to help Salvi. Salvi's parents were concerned that he was troubled, but they did not seek professional psychiatric assistance for their son as they thought that the stigma of mental illness could impair Salvi's ability to live on his own.

Salvi believed in a number of far-fetched conspiracy theories. While considered by his defense as evidence of severe mental illness, many elements of his conspiracy beliefs reflected those of others on the extreme end of anti-abortion activism: "Shortly after his arrest he released a handwritten note alleging conspiracies of Freemasons, conspiracies to manipulate paper currency, and conspiracies against Catholics. ... He has talked about the Vatican printing its own currency and a specific conspiracy of the Ku Klux Klan, the Freemasons, and the Mob."

Although Salvi was diagnosed with schizophrenia by the defense's psychiatrist (which contradicted the prosecution), he did not receive treatment for his illness in prison.

== Aftermath ==
Then-Cardinal of the Archdiocese of Boston, Bernard Law, called for a moratorium on clinic protests following the shooting. Part of his reasoning was that other disturbed individuals could be inspired to commit violence during the protests. However, the moratorium was ignored by aggressive anti-abortionists in the archdiocese, including Catholic members of the local Operation Rescue group. A police detail was also put out in front of Law's residence in Brighton.

Law said the shootings were "reprehensible acts of violence with absolutely no justification whatsoever." President Bill Clinton called on all Americans, regardless of their views on abortion, to condemn the act of "domestic terrorism."

Hillcrest Clinic, in Virginia, had been a target of pickets by Donald Spitz, a known supporter of anti-abortion violence, before Salvi attacked it. The Boston Globe reported that Salvi had Spitz's name and unlisted phone number on his person at the time of his arrest. Spitz was never charged in connection with Salvi's activities. Spitz held a rally in support of Salvi outside of Norfolk City Jail. The Massachusetts Citizens for Life requested that Spitz not attend Salvi's trial, because of his outspoken endorsement of anti-abortion violence.

Law and then-Governor William F. Weld convened a group of six women, three pro-life leaders and three pro-choice leaders, to engage in a facilitated discussion in an attempt to calm rhetoric and prevent future outbursts of violence. The group met in secret for over five years for a total of more than 150 hours of discussion.

== Death and vacation of conviction ==
On November 29, 1996, at 6:05 a.m., Salvi was found dead in his prison cell at MCI Cedar Junction in Walpole, Massachusetts, with a garbage bag over his head tied around his neck. Salvi was found under his bed with his hands and feet tied up. Salvi was rushed to the hospital where he was pronounced dead at 6:55 a.m. The official report states that Salvi's death was a suicide.

On February 1, 1997, his conviction was overturned by the sentencing judge. Judge Barbara Dortch-Okara invoked the legal principle of abatement ab initio, which says that a conviction may not stand if the accused dies before his appeals are exhausted.

David Bear, a psychiatrist who examined Salvi, was not surprised by his death. Salvi believed the purpose of his life was to get out his message about Catholic oppression, Bear said. Not being able to do so in jail took "the central motivation of his life." Salvi's mother expressed sadness after his death that her son was not placed in a facility to deal with his mental illness but instead in a general prison population.
