= Susan W. Calkins =

American judge (born 1942)

Justice of the Maine Supreme Judicial Court
- In office September 2, 1998 – October 1, 2007
- Preceded by: David G. Roberts
- Succeeded by: Ellen Gorman

Personal details
- Born: Susan Williamson; December 15, 1942 (age 83) Colorado, U.S.
- Education: University of Colorado (BA); University of Maine (JD); University of Virginia (LLM)

Susan Williamson Calkins (born December 15, 1942) is a former justice of the Maine Supreme Judicial Court appointed by Governor Angus King who served from September 2, 1998 to October 1, 2007. Born in Colorado, she graduated from the University of Maine School of Law and joined Pine Tree Legal Services as an attorney in 1970. After serving as acting director for a time, she formally became director in 1974. In 1980, Calkins was nominated to the Maine District Court, where she was confirmed by the Maine Senate 30–2 after Governor Joseph E. Brennan's counsel dispelled rumors that she was involved in demonstrations at the Seabrook Station Nuclear Power Plant.

Two years into her term, a group of Enfield, Maine residents tried seeking Calkins' dismissal, finding her standards and sentences to be too lenient; members of the Committee on Judicial Responsibility and Disability found nothing to pursue as she had not been acting unethically. In 1990, after a period as Deputy Chief Judge, Calkins was named Chief District Court Judge. She served in that position until 1998, when she was nominated to the Maine Supreme Judicial Court. During her time as Chief Judge, Calkins focused on making the court more user-friendly, and was praised for her written opinions, which were considered clear and understandable even for non-lawyers. She formally became a Justice on September 2, 1998 and was re-appointed in 2005. She served on the Court until October 1, 2007, when she resigned from the seat, retiring from the judiciary.

Political offices
| Preceded by David G. Roberts | Justice of the Maine Supreme Judicial Court; 1998–2007 | Succeeded by Ellen Gorman |
