= Charles A. Pomeroy =

American judge (1914–1993)

Charles Alonzo Pomeroy (December 20, 1914 – December 28, 1993), of Windham, Maine, was a justice of the Maine Supreme Judicial Court from July 2, 1969 to January 1, 1980.

== Early life, education, and military service ==
Born in Auburn, Maine, Pomeroy attended Edward Little High School. and received a J.D. from Columbus School of Law in Washington, D.C., in 1936. Returning to Maine, he "practiced in the Lewiston firm of Brann & Isaacson" with former Governor Louis J. Brann until 1943, and thereafter served as Auburn city solicitor.

In February 1944, Pomeroy was inducted into the United States Navy to serve in World War II, spending two years in the Pacific Theatre. Upon his return, he practiced law in Portland, Maine, and in 1949 was named a referee in bankruptcy.

== Judicial service and later life ==
In 1956, Governor Edmund Muskie appointed Pomeroy to the Maine Superior Court, and in 1956 Governor Kenneth M. Curtis elevated Pomeroy to a seat on the Maine Supreme Judicial Court. Pomeroy retired from the court in 1980, and was thereafter the first chairman of Maine's Indian Tribal-State Commission, created the same year.

== Personal life and death ==
Pomeroy married Arlene Currier, also of Auburn, with whom he had two sons and two daughters.

In 1991, he moved to Orlando, Florida, where he died at Winter Park Memorial Hospital two years later, at the age of 79.

Political offices
Preceded by Walter M. Tapley	Justice of the Maine Supreme Judicial Court; 1969–1980	Succeeded by David G. Roberts
