= Francis C. Marsano =

American judge, lawyer and politician (1936–2024)

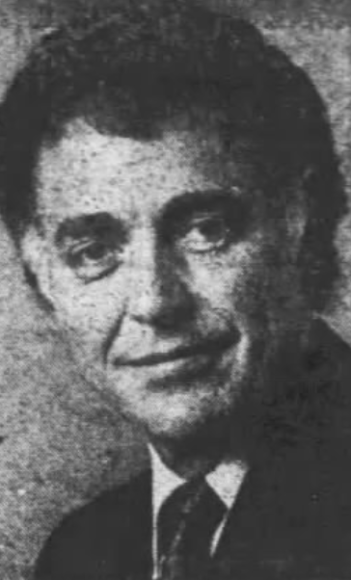
- Marsano in 1986

Member of the Maine House of Representatives
- In office 1986–1992

Justice of the Maine Superior Court
- In office April 9, 1993 – October 9, 2001
- Nominated by: John R. McKernan Jr.

Personal details
- Born: Francis Charles Marsano; September 8, 1936 Bangor, Maine, U.S.
- Died: November 30, 2024 (aged 88) Bangor, Maine, U.S.
- Party: Republican
- Children: 3
- Education: Bowdoin College; University of Michigan Law School
- Occupation: Judge, lawyer

Francis Charles Marsano (September 18, 1936 – November 30, 2024) was an American judge, lawyer and politician. A member of the Republican Party, he served in the Maine House of Representatives from 1986 to 1992 and as justice of the Maine Superior Court from 1993 to 2001.

== Life and career ==
Marsano was born in Bangor, Maine, the son of Alton Marsano and Gertrude Mannette. He attended Bowdoin College, earning his B.A. degree in 1958. He then attended the University of Michigan Law School, earning his Juris Doctor degree in 1961. He was a second lieutenant in the United States Army Reserve.

Marsano served in the Maine House of Representatives from 1986 to 1992. After his service in the House, Governor John R. McKernan Jr. nominated Marsano to serve as a justice of the Maine Superior Court, serving until 2001.

== Death ==
Marsano died on November 30, 2024, in Bangor, Maine, at the age of 88.
