= Edward S. Godfrey (judge) =

American judge (1913–2005)

Edward Settle Godfrey III (July 21, 1913 – January 12, 2005), was the founding Dean of the University of Maine School of Law, and a justice of the Maine Supreme Judicial Court from September 1, 1976, to September 1, 1983.

Born in Phoenix, Arizona, to Edward S. and Alma Dean (McDonald) Godfrey, he attended The Albany Academy, receiving his undergraduate degree from Harvard College in 1934, summa cum laude, and his law degree from Columbia Law School in 1939. Godfery became a professor at Albany Law School in New York, where he remained until 1961, when he moved to Portland, Maine, to serve as founding dean of the University of Maine School of Law.

In 1976, Godfrey was appointed to the Maine high court, where he remained for seven years.

Following his service on the court, Godfrey continued to work in the University of Maine School of Law, teaching well into his eighties and "frequenting his office there" until a few months before his death, at the age of 91.

Political offices
Preceded by Randolph Weatherbee	Justice of the Maine Supreme Judicial Court; 1976–1983	Succeeded by Louis Scolnik
