= Pierce Atwood =

US law firm

Pierce Atwood LLP
- Type: Limited liability partnership
- Industry: Law
- Founded: 1891; 135 years ago
- Founder: Joseph White Symonds
- Headquarters: Portland, Maine, United States
- Number of locations: 7 offices (2026)
- Services: Corporate Law, Commercial Litigation, Energy & Environmental Law, Real Estate
- Number of employees: 300+, including 150+ attorneys (2026)
- Website: pierceatwood.com

Pierce Atwood LLP is an American law firm based in New England. It is the third largest firm in Maine and one of the largest in northern New England. Headquartered in Portland, Maine, the firm has offices in Maine, Massachusetts, New Hampshire, Rhode Island, and Washington, D.C. It is named in part for Edward W. Atwood, a state legislator and lobbyist. It has approximately 150 attorneys on staff.

It was formerly known as Pierce, Atwood, Scribner, Allen, Smith & Lancaster.

== Notable people ==
- Jane Amero
- Joshua Dunlap
- John Formella
- William J. Kayatta Jr.
- Nikolas P. Kerest
- Vincent L. McKusick
- Fred C. Scribner Jr.
- Daniel Wathen

== See also ==
- Merrill's Wharf, the business's home in Portland, Maine
