= William R. Stokes =

American lawyer

William R. Stokes is an American politician and former mayor of Augusta, Maine. Stokes became mayor of Augusta on June 16, 2011, when his predecessor, former Mayor Roger Katz, resigned from office to take a seat in the Maine Senate. Stokes is a member of the Democratic Party.

Stokes was also the chief of the criminal division of the Maine Attorney General's Office.

On May 7, 2014, Stokes was nominated to serve as a justice of the Maine Superior Court by Governor Paul LePage. Stokes was nominated to the seat held by Jeffrey Hjelm; Hjelm was nominated to serve on the Maine Supreme Judicial Court. Stokes was unanimously confirmed on July 31, and had said he would need to resign as mayor at that moment.

== See also ==
- List of mayors of Augusta, Maine
