= Jill A. Pryor =

American judge (born 1963)

Jill Pryor
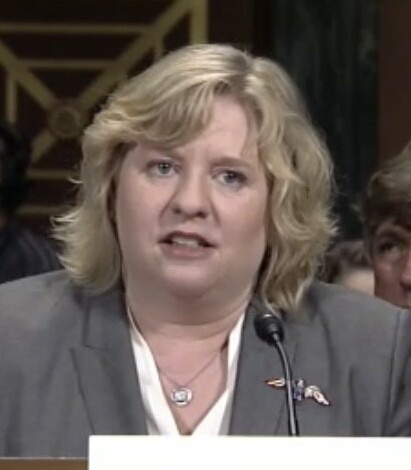
- Pryor in 2014

Judge of the United States Court of Appeals for the Eleventh Circuit
- Incumbent
- Assumed office September 9, 2014
- Appointed by: Barack Obama
- Preceded by: Stanley F. Birch Jr.

Personal details
- Born: 1963 (age 62–63) Harrisburg, Pennsylvania, U.S.
- Education: College of William and Mary (BA); Yale University (JD)

Jill Anne Pryor (born in 1963) is a United States circuit judge of the United States Court of Appeals for the Eleventh Circuit. Pryor was born in Harrisburg, Pennsylvania.

== Education ==
Pryor received her Bachelor of Arts degree in 1985 from the College of William & Mary, graduating Phi Beta Kappa and Omicron Delta Kappa. She then attended Yale Law School, where she was an editor of the Yale Law Journal. She graduated with a Juris Doctor in 1988.

Pryor was a law clerk for Judge James Larry Edmondson of the United States Court of Appeals for the Eleventh Circuit from 1988 to 1989.

== Career ==
Pryor joined the white shoe law firm of Bondurant, Mixson & Elmore LLP in Atlanta as an associate in 1989, becoming a partner in 1997, a position she held before going on the bench in 2014. In private practice, she represented both plaintiffs and defendants in civil litigation in state and federal courts at both the trial and appellate level, including in tort law, contract law, intellectual property, shareholder resolution, and corporate governance cases. She has served on the State Bar of Georgia Board of Governors and on the Board of Directors for the Georgia Legal Services Program. She has served as President of the Georgia Association of Women Lawyers and as Chair of the State Bar of Georgia's Appellate Practice Section. Additionally, Pryor was formerly a member of the Lawyers Advisory Committee of the United States Court of Appeals for the Eleventh Circuit as well as a member of the Executive Committee of the American Bar Association's Council of Appellate Lawyers.

== Federal judicial service ==
On February 16, 2012, President Barack Obama nominated Pryor to be a United States Circuit Judge of the United States Court of Appeals for the Eleventh Circuit to replace Judge Stanley F. Birch Jr., who retired in 2010. Both of Georgia's U.S. Senators, Johnny Isakson and Saxby Chambliss, refused to return the "blue slips" on her nomination, effectively blocking the nomination. On January 2, 2013, her nomination was returned to the President because of the sine die adjournment of the Senate.

On January 3, 2013, she was renominated to the same judgeship. She received a hearing before the full panel of the Senate Judiciary Committee on May 13, 2014. On June 19, 2014 her nomination was reported out of committee by voice vote.

On July 30, 2014, Senate Majority Leader Harry Reid motioned to invoke cloture on Pryor's nomination. On July 31, 2014, the United States Senate invoked cloture on Pryor's nomination by a 58–33 vote. On September 8, 2014, her nomination was confirmed by a 97–0 vote. She received her judicial commission on September 9, 2014. She took the oath of office on October 6, 2014.

== Notable rulings ==
- In Jones et al. v. DeSantis, a 2020 voting rights case, Pryor wrote a scathing dissenting opinion. 2018 Florida Amendment 4 permitted former felons to vote; however, Florida Governor Ron DeSantis signed a law that required former felons to pay all legal fees before being eligible to vote again, despite some of them not knowing how much they owed. By a 6-4 vote, the 11th circuit upheld that law. Pryor wrote "The majority today deprives the plaintiffs and countless others like them of opportunity and equality in voting through its denial of the plaintiffs’ due process, Twenty-fourth Amendment, and equal protection claims. I dissent."
- In Adams ex rel. Kasper v. School Board of St. Johns County, Florida (2022), a transgender rights case, Pryor wrote a comprehensive dissenting opinion. Pryor wrote that “the majority opinion simply declares — without any basis — that a person’s “biological sex” is comprised solely of chromosomal structure and birth-assigned sex… in disregard of the record evidence — evidence the majority does not contest — which demonstrates that gender identity is an immutable, biological component of a person’s sex… In sum, the majority opinion reverses the district court without addressing the question presented, without concluding that a single factual finding is clearly erroneous, without discussing any of the unrebutted expert testimony, and without putting the School District to its evidentiary burden.”
- In Warren v. DeSantis, a 2024 First Amendment retaliation case, Pryor wrote a unanimous panel opinion vacating a lower court's decision. The lower court concluded that Florida Governor Ron DeSantis's suspension of elected State Attorney Andrew Warren did not violate the First Amendment. Warren, a Democrat, adopted policies creating nonprosecution presumptions and signed advocacy statements, including one criticizing bills targeting the transgender community and one committing "to exercise [his] well-settled discretion and refrain from prosecuting those who seek, provide, or support abortions.” Based on Warren’s policies and advocacy, DeSantis suspended him from office and appointed a political ally to replace him. Warren sued, and the district court concluded that DeSantis would have suspended Warren based on activities unprotected by the First Amendment. The Eleventh Circuit disagreed, concluding that the district court erred in concluding that the First Amendment did not protect Warren’s support of a sentence in the advocacy statement about prosecuting abortion cases and in concluding that the First Amendment did not preclude DeSantis from suspending Warren to gain political benefit from bringing down a reform prosecutor. It sent the case back to the district court to reexamine whether DeSantis would have suspended Warren based solely on the unprotected activities that motivated the suspension. Judge Kevin Newsom concurred, stressing that Warren's activities included an "expression of pure political speech made by an elected government official, and thus entitled to full First Amendment protection" and noting that Pryor's opinion "correctly reverses and remands the case for a re-weighing."

== See also ==
- Barack Obama judicial appointment controversies

Legal offices
Preceded by Stanley F. Birch Jr.	Judge of the United States Court of Appeals for the Eleventh Circuit; 2014–present	Incumbent
