= Wayne R. Douglas =

American judge (born 1951 or 1952)

Wayne Douglas

Associate Justice of the Maine Supreme Judicial Court
- Incumbent
- Assumed office March 10, 2023
- Appointed by: Janet Mills
- Preceded by: Thomas E. Humphrey

Personal details
- Born: 1951 or 1952 (age 72–73)
- Education: Bates College (BA); University of Maine (JD)

Wayne R. Douglas (born 1951 or 1952) is an American lawyer and jurist serving as an associate justice of the Maine Supreme Judicial Court. Nominated in February 2023 by Governor Janet Mills, he assumed office on March 10, 2023.

== Education ==
Douglas earned a Bachelor of Arts from Bates College in 1974 and a Juris Doctor from the University of Maine School of Law in 1979.

== Career ==
After graduating from law school, he clerked for Associate Justice Sidney W. Wernick of the Maine Supreme Judicial Court and then Judge Edward Gignoux of the U.S. District Court for the District of Maine. Subsequently, Douglas spent a decade at Pierce Atwood in Portland, Maine. He later served as chief legal advisor to then-Governor Angus King and as an associate commissioner of the Maine Department of Mental Health. King later appointed Douglas to serve as a judge of the Maine Superior Court. In February 2023, Governor Janet Mills nominated Douglas to serve as an associate justice of the Maine Supreme Judicial Court. He was sworn in on March 10, 2023.

Legal offices
Preceded by Thomas E. Humphrey	Associate Justice of the Maine Supreme Judicial Court; 2023–present	Incumbent
