= Joshua Dunlap =

American judge (born 1983)

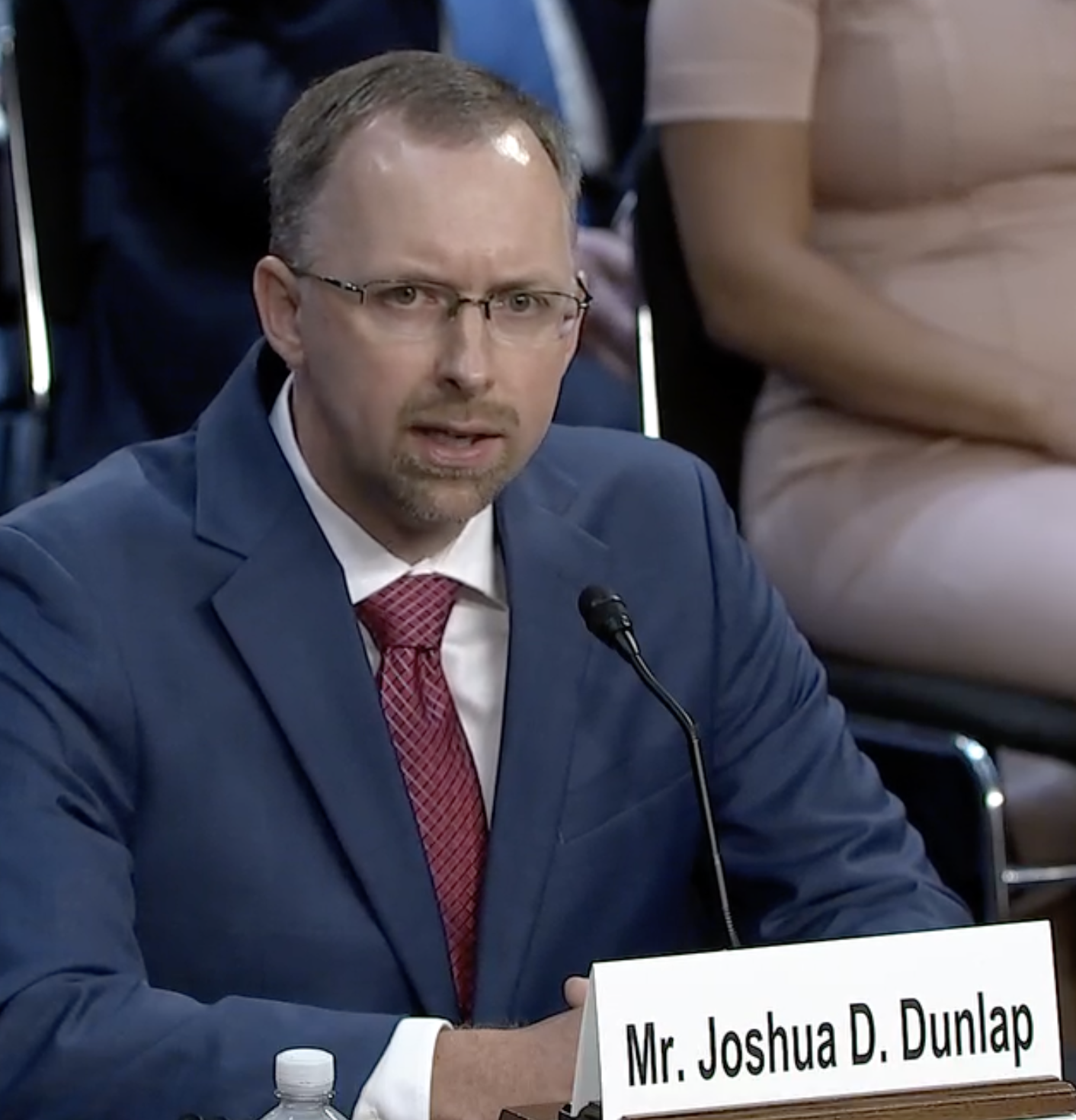

Judge of the United States Court of Appeals for the First Circuit
- Incumbent
- Assumed office November 7, 2025
- Appointed by: Donald Trump
- Preceded by: William J. Kayatta Jr.

Personal details
- Born: Joshua Dale Dunlap; 1983 (age 42–43) Waterville, Maine, U.S.
- Education: Pensacola Christian College (BA); University of Notre Dame (JD)

Joshua Dale Dunlap (born 1983) is an American lawyer who has served as a United States circuit judge of the United States Court of Appeals for the First Circuit since 2025. Before that, he practiced law at the Maine firm Pierce Atwood from 2009 to 2025.

== Early life and education ==
Dunlap was born in 1983, in Waterville, Maine. He received a Bachelor of Arts, summa cum laude, in 2005 from Pensacola Christian College. In 2008, he received a Juris Doctor, also summa cum laude, from Notre Dame Law School, where he earned the Colonel William J. Hoynes Award, the school's highest academic honor, and served as note editor for the Notre Dame Law Review. Dunlap served as a law clerk for Judge Paul Joseph Kelly Jr. of the United States Court of Appeals for the Tenth Circuit from 2008 to 2009.

== Career ==
In 2009, Dunlap joined the law firm of Pierce Atwood in its Portland office as an associate. In 2018, he was promoted to be a partner. His focus was on commercial litigation at the trial and appellate levels.

=== Federal judicial service ===
On July 2, 2025, President Donald Trump announced his intention to nominate Dunlap to a seat vacated by Judge William J. Kayatta Jr. of the United States Court of Appeals for the First Circuit. A hearing on his nomination was held on July 30, 2025. On September 11, 2025, his nomination was advanced to the United States Senate by a 12–10 vote. On October 30, 2025, the Senate invoked cloture on his nomination by a 51–47 vote. Dunlap was confirmed on November 4, 2025 by a 52–46 vote. He received his judicial commission on November 7, 2025.

== Personal ==
Dunlap resides in Scarborough, Maine.

Legal offices
Preceded by William J. Kayatta Jr.	Judge of the United States Court of Appeals for the First Circuit; 2025–present	Incumbent
