= Percival Bonney =

American judge (1842–1906)

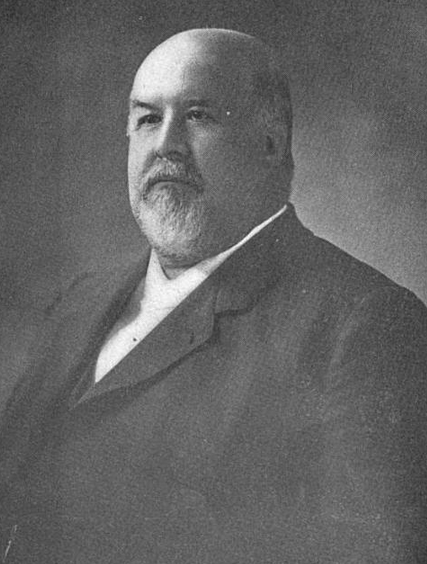
- Born: September 14, 1842; Minot, Maine, U.S.
- Died: August 4, 1906 (aged 63)
- Education: Colby College

Percival Bonney (September 14, 1842 – August 4, 1906) was a judge of the Maine Superior Court.

== Personal ==
Bonney was born in Minot, Maine, and was the only child of William Lowell and Adeline French Bonney. He attended Hebron Academy and graduated from Waterville College (now Colby College) in 1863. He married Elizabeth H. Bray on August 5, 1864, and had two daughters, Adeline L. and Helen B.

== Career ==
Bonney began his career as a clerk at the United States Department of the Treasury from 1863 to 1865, then studied law in the office of J.H. Drummond in Portland, Maine. From 1866 to 1878 he practiced law, later forming a partnership with Stanley T. Pullen, before he was appointed to the Maine Superior Court by 35th Governor of Maine, Seldon Connor.

He was a director of the Union Mutual Life Insurance Company (now Unum), a member of the Maine Legislature in 1869 and 1870, a member of the Delta Kappa Epsilon and Phi Beta Kappa Society, President of the Board of Trustees at Hebron Academy, and chair of the Colby College Board of Trustees from 1902 to 1906.
