= Kermit Lipez =

American judge (born 1941)

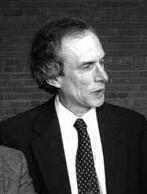
- Lipez in 2003

Senior Judge of the United States Court of Appeals for the First Circuit
- Incumbent
- Assumed office December 31, 2011

Judge of the United States Court of Appeals for the First Circuit
- In office April 7, 1998 – December 31, 2011
- Appointed by: Bill Clinton
- Preceded by: Conrad K. Cyr
- Succeeded by: William J. Kayatta Jr.

Personal details
- Born: Kermit Victor Lipez; 1941 (age 84–85) Philadelphia, Pennsylvania, U.S.
- Children: Julia M. Lipez
- Education: Haverford College (BA); Yale University (LLB); University of Virginia (LLM)

Kermit Victor Lipez (born 1941) is an American lawyer who serves as a senior United States circuit judge of the United States Court of Appeals for the First Circuit.

== Education and early career ==
Lipez received a Bachelor of Arts degree from Haverford College in 1963 and his Bachelor of Laws from Yale Law School in 1967. Lipez also earned a Master of Laws from the University of Virginia School of Law in 1990.

Lipez formerly served as a staff attorney in the United States Department of Justice Honor Program, Civil Rights Division, from 1967 to 1968. He then served as a special assistant and legal counsel to Maine Governor Kenneth M. Curtis from 1968 to 1971 and as a legislative aide to United States Senator Edmund Muskie from 1971 to 1972, until entering private practice in Portland, Maine, where he stayed until joining the Maine trial court in 1985.

== State judicial service ==
Lipez's judicial career began with his service as a justice of the Maine Superior Court, on which he served from 1985 to 1994. He was appointed to the Maine Supreme Judicial Court in 1994, where he served until his investiture as a federal judge.

== Federal judicial service ==
President Bill Clinton nominated Lipez to the United States Court of Appeals for the First Circuit on October 20, 1997, to fill a seat vacated when Judge Conrad K. Cyr assumed senior status. Lipez was confirmed by the Senate on April 2, 1998, and received his commission on April 7, 1998. Future Maine politician Heather Sanborn was his law clerk after graduating from the University of Maine School of Law in 2007.

Lipez assumed senior status on December 31, 2011. He was succeeded by Judge William J. Kayatta Jr.

In August 2017, Lipez dissented when the en banc circuit, in an opinion by Judge Kayatta, rejected a lawsuit seeking to give Puerto Ricans the right to vote.

== Sources ==
Legal offices
| Preceded by Conrad K. Cyr | Judge of the United States Court of Appeals for the First Circuit; 1998–2011 | Succeeded by William J. Kayatta Jr. |
