= Fred C. Scribner Jr. =

American lawyer

- Born: 1908; Bath, Maine, US
- Died: 1994 (aged 85–86)
- Occupations: Lawyer, political strategist
- Known for: Chief strategist of Richard Nixon's 1960 presidential campaign

Fred C. Scribner Jr. (1908 − 1994) was an American lawyer from Maine. Born in Bath, Maine, Scribner grew up in Portland. His father was a wealthy real-estate developer and Mason. Scribner Jr. graduated from Portland's Deering High School in 1926, Dartmouth College in 1930, and Harvard Law School in 1933. Scribner served in the Eisenhower administration, rising to the position of under secretary of the United States Treasury. He also served on the National Security Council from 1959 to 1961 and was later a critic of heightened tensions with the Soviet Union during the presidency of John F. Kennedy. An Old Guard Republican, he later served as a chief strategist for Richard Nixon's failed presidential bid in 1960. He helped organize the Kennedy-Nixon debates, which were the first in presidential history. After Nixon lost, he left federal politics and returned to his home state of Maine and eventually became a partner in the law firm of Pierce, Atwood, Scribner, Allen, Smith & Lancaster (now known as Pierce Atwood).

The Scribner family papers are held at the Maine Historical Society.
