= Edward W. Atwood =

American politician

Member of the Maine House of Representatives from the Portland district
- In office 1923–1926

Personal details
- Party: Republican
- Occupation: Attorney & State Legislator

Edward W. Atwood was an American lawyer and politician from Maine. Atwood, a Republican, represented Portland in the Maine House of Representatives for two terms from 1923 – 1926. Prior to serving in the Legislature, Atwood had served as a Flying Ace during World War I.

Atwood was a longtime lobbyist and partner in the law firm Pierce Atwood. As a lobbyist, he worked on behalf of the state's leading paper companies, which owned much of the land and controlled a significant amount of Maine's economy. Vincent L. McKusick, who was a partner in the firm, described him as "a very effective lawyer."
