= Louis Scolnik =

American judge (1923–2024)

Associate Justice of the Maine Supreme Judicial Court
- In office September 7, 1983 – July 31, 1988

Justice of the Maine Superior Court
- In office 1981–1983

Personal details
- Born: February 14, 1923 Lewiston, Maine, U.S.
- Died: October 10, 2024 (aged 101) Andover, Massachusetts, U.S.
- Spouse: Paula Scolnik (m. 1951; died 2018)
- Children: 3
- Education: Georgetown Law School
- Occupation: Judge

Military service
- Allegiance: United States
- Branch/service: United States Navy
- Years of service: 1945
- Rank: Officer
- Battles/wars: World War II
- Military career

Louis Scolnik (February 14, 1923 – October 10, 2024) was an American civil rights attorney and jurist who served as the 94th Associate Justice of the Maine Supreme Judicial Court from September 7, 1983, to July 31, 1988.

== Early life and military service ==
Scolnik was born in Lewiston, Maine, on February 14, 1923, to Julius and Bessie Scolnik, Jewish immigrants who fled Kovno, Lithuania, in 1904. In Lewiston, Julius Scolnik ran a dry goods store with his brother Kalman. Raised in a kosher household, Scolnik often recalled how his mother would send him to school with unwrapped potato latkes in his pockets, which he would eat covered in lint. Scolnik became enamored with jazz music at the age of 12, and upon graduation from Lewiston High School, attended Bates College, where he was part of the Bates College jazz ensemble.

While studying at Bates, the Japanese attack on Pearl Harbor occurred, prompting Scolnik to enroll in the College's V-12 Naval Program. In the final year of World War II, he served as an officer on LCI(L) 776, a U.S. Navy infantry amphibious landing ship, which received heavy fire just before the surrender of Japan. While in the Navy, Scolnik participated in landings in the Philippines and occupation duty in China, held impromptu jam sessions with other musicians in the service, and went on to ultimately command his ship.

After the war, Scolnik returned to Bates College, where he completed his BA in 1947. He then attended Georgetown University Law Center in Washington, D.C., and earned an LLB in 1952. On the advice of a professor, he returned to his hometown of Lewiston to practice law.

== Legal career ==
Scolnik’s legal career was defined by his steadfast commitment to civil rights and civil liberties. He opened his own private practice in 1957 and served as corporation counsel to the City of Lewiston, counsel to the central Maine branch of the NAACP, and chair of the Maine Advisory Committee to the U.S. Commission on Civil Rights, seeking to end housing discrimination against black service members stationed in Maine. He served as the only cooperating attorney in Maine for the national American Civil Liberties Union for sixteen years and, in 1968, helped organize and became the first president of the ACLU’s Maine chapter. Among the organization’s earliest victories were cases involving prisoners’ rights, sex discrimination, and religion in public schools.

In 1974, Governor Kenneth Curtis appointed Scolnik to the Maine Superior Court, where he was eventually named presiding justice for Region II, covering seven counties. As a trial court judge, Scolnik was obliged to ride circuit, hearing cases around the state. During these month-long sojourns, he would bring his golden retriever Sarah to keep him company. Sarah would remain in chambers during the trials, but Scolnik joked with the attorneys that one bark meant guilty, two barks innocent and three barks a mistrial. In 1983, Scolnik was elevated to the Maine Supreme Judicial Court, where he served until his retirement in 1988. One of the first decisions he authored as a justice struck down a local obscenity statute in his hometown of Lewiston, which Scolnik observed "would reduce the adult population to reading only what is fit for juveniles."

== Jazz career ==
In addition to his legal pursuits, Scolnik was a jazz musician, playing tenor saxophone and clarinet throughout his life. As he had said, “I wasn’t a hangin’ judge, I was a swingin’ judge.” He played in various dance bands during his high school and college years and even had a jazz trio on board his ship in the Pacific.

After retiring from the court, Scolnik again formed a jazz band, the Golden Years Trio, which played for seniors for several years, until the death of one of its members. Among his favorite tunes were “Sunny Side of the Street” and “Our Love is Here to Stay.”

== Personal life and death ==
In 1951, Scolnik married Paula Revitz, a beloved high school English teacher, with whom he had three daughters: Nina, Donna, and Julie. They were married for 67 years until Paula's death on August 5, 2018. During her final years, Scolnik devoted himself to her care.

Scolnik died in Andover, Massachusetts, on October 10, 2024, at age 101.

== Honors ==
Scolnik won numerous awards throughout his career, including, in 1989, the Baldwin Award from the Maine chapter of the American Civil Liberties Union in recognition of his lifetime commitment to civil liberties in Maine. That same year, the ACLU of Maine established the Justice Louis Scolnik Award, which annually honors members of the legal community who have demonstrated an outstanding commitment to the protection of civil liberties. He received this honor for lifetime achievement in 2019.

Political offices
Preceded by Edward S. Godfrey	Justice of the Maine Supreme Judicial Court; 1983–1988	Succeeded by Samuel Collins
