= Thomas E. Humphrey =

American judge

Thomas Humphrey

Associate Justice of the Maine Supreme Judicial Court
- In office June 9, 2015 – March 7, 2022
- Appointed by: Paul LePage
- Preceded by: Warren Silver
- Succeeded by: Wayne R. Douglas

Personal details
- Born: Thomas Edward Humphrey; November 19, 1945 (age 79); Hartford, Connecticut, U.S.
- Education: Boston College (BS, JD)

Thomas Edward Humphrey (born November 19, 1945) is an American lawyer and jurist. He served as an associate justice on the Maine Supreme Judicial Court from 2015 to 2022. Hs is a former chief justice of the Maine Superior Court.

== Early life and education ==
Humphrey graduated from Rocky Hill High School in 1963. Humphrey graduated cum laude from Boston College in 1969. He earned his Juris Doctor from Boston College Law School in 1972.

== Career ==
Humphrey was a member of Boston College Law Review from 1970 to 1972, serving as an editor from 1971 to 1972. From 1976 to 1993 he was in private practice and was a prosecutor for the York County District Attorney's Office.

From 1993 to 1998 he served as a judge on the Maine District Court. From 1998 to 2015 he served as a justice and later chief justice of the Maine Superior Court.

In 2015 he was nominated by Governor Paul LePage and confirmed by the Maine Senate, to the Maine Supreme Judicial Court. Humphrey retired on March 7, 2023.

Legal offices
Preceded by Warren Silver	Associate Justice of the Maine Supreme Judicial Court; 2015–2022	Succeeded by Wayne R. Douglas
