= David G. Roberts =

American judge (1928–1999)

David Glendenning Roberts (July 17, 1928 – January 26, 1999), of Portland, Maine, was a justice of the Maine Supreme Judicial Court from January 11, 1980, to August 31, 1998.

Born in Penobscot County, Maine, he attended the Mount Hermon School for Boys in Gill, Massachusetts and received an undergraduate degree from Bowdoin College in 1950, and a law degree from Boston University School of Law in 1956. He "served in the United States Army from September 1951 to October 1953 and was stationed in both Japan and Korea". He became a lieutenant.

Roberts "began his law practice in Caribou in 1960, then shortly afterwards moved to Bangor". From 1961 to 1966, Roberts served as an assistant United States Attorney for District of Maine. In 1967, Roberts was appointed as a Maine Superior Court judge.

On November 30, 1979, Governor Joseph E. Brennan named Roberts to the Maine Supreme Judicial Court. In 1980, President Jimmy Carter nominated Roberts to a seat on the United States District Court for the District of Maine vacated by George J. Mitchell, but Carter's term as president expired without a vote on confirmation being taken. Roberts remained on the state supreme court until his retirement on August 31, 1998.

Roberts was killed in an automobile accident in Portland, Maine, less than six months after retiring from the court.

Political offices
| Preceded by Charles A. Pomeroy | Justice of the Maine Supreme Judicial Court; 1980–1998 | Succeeded by Donald G. Alexander |
