= Barbara A. Dortch-Okara =

First African American Chief Justice for Massachusetts

Barbara A. Dortch-Okara (born 1949) is an American lawyer, who was the first African American woman to be appointed Chief justice for the Massachusetts trial courts.

== Early life and education ==
Dortch-Okara grew up in Memphis, Tennessee. Dortch-Okara graduated from Brandeis University with a bachelor's in politics in 1971 and Boston College Law School in 1974.

== Career ==
After law school, Dortch-Okara was general counsel of the Massachusetts Port Authority, attorney adviser for the Massachusetts office of the U.S. Department of the Interior, and assistant corporate counsel for the City of Boston. In 1984, she served in the Boston Municipal Court. In 1989, she was appointed by Governor Michael Dukakis to the Superior Court, extending her service for 20 years. She presided over the Salvi trial in 1996. In 1998, she was named to oversee the Trial Court. She lost her bid for a second term as the state's chief justice for administration and management in 2003, after conflicts with Chief Justice Margaret Marshall.

In her retirement, Dortch-Okara taught at New England Law.

== Awards and honors ==
In 1996, she received an honorary law degree from the New England School of Law. In 2011, Dortch-Okara was honored by the Massachusetts Black Lawyers Association with its Trailblazer Award. In 2023, she was recognized as one of "Boston’s most admired, beloved, and successful Black Women leaders" by the Black Women Lead project.
