= Robert W. Clifford =

American judge (born 1937)

Associate Justice of the Maine Supreme Judicial Court
- In office August 1, 1986 – August 31, 2009
- Appointed by: Joseph E. Brennan
- Preceded by: Elmer H. Violette
- Succeeded by: Joseph Jabar

Chief Justice of the Maine Superior Court
- In office 1984 – August 1, 1986

Justice of the Maine Superior Court
- In office June 8, 1979 – 1984
- Appointed by: Joseph E. Brennan

Member of the Maine Senate from the 13th district
- In office January 3, 1973 – January 5, 1977
- Preceded by: William H. Clifford Jr.
- Succeeded by: Thomas M. Mangan

Mayor of Lewiston
- In office January 1971 – January 1973
- Preceded by: John B. Beliveau
- Succeeded by: John C. Orestis

Member of the Lewiston Board of Aldermen
- In office January 1968 – January 1970; President: 1969

Personal details
- Born: Robert William Clifford; May 2, 1937 (age 89) Lewiston, Maine, U.S.
- Party: Democratic
- Spouse: Clementina
- Children: 2
- Education: Bowdoin College (AB); Boston College (JD); University of Virginia (LLM)

Military service
- Branch/service: United States Army
- Years of service: 1962-1964
- Rank: Captain
- Unit: U.S. Seventh Army

Robert William Clifford (born May 2, 1937) is an American politician, lawyer and retired associate justice of the Maine Supreme Judicial Court. He was appointed to this position on August 1, 1986 by then-governor Joseph Brennan. He was reappointed to seven-year terms in 1993, 2000, and 2007. He retired in 2009.

== Education ==
Clifford grew up in Lewiston, Maine and graduated from Lewiston High School in 1955. He graduated from Bowdoin College in 1959, and earned a J.D. degree from Boston College Law School in 1962. He then served in the United States Army from 1962 to 1964 with the U.S. Seventh Army in Germany, attaining the rank of captain. In 1998, he earned an LLM in Judicial Process from the University of Virginia School of Law.

== Career ==
Upon leaving the armed forces, Clifford practiced law in Lewiston-Auburn for fifteen years with the firm Clifford & Clifford. He was also an alderman and a two-time mayor in this city.

During his legislative tenure, he represented the senate on the Commission to Revise Maine's Probate Laws, which drafted Maine's current Probate Code. In 1978 and 1979 he was the Chairman of the Lewiston Charter Commission, which drafted Lewiston's current city charter.

On June 8, 1979, former Governor Joseph Brennan appointed Clifford to the state's Superior Court. Another appointment by Chief Justice Vincent L. McKusick made Clifford the first chief justice of the Maine Superior Court in 1984, a position he would hold until his appointment to the Supreme Judicial Court on August 1, 1986 by Governor Brennan.

Justice Clifford served as the Court's liaison to the Advisory Committee on the Rules of Criminal Procedure, and to the Maine Assistance Program. He also served as an adviser to the Criminal Law Advisory Commission.

Prior to his judicial service, Clifford worked in the state's senate during the 106th and 107th Legislatures as a Democrat.

After retiring from the court in 2009, he served two terms as an active retired justice, making his final retirement in October 2024.

== Personal life ==
His wife is Clementina whom he married in 1964 and they have two children.

Political offices
Preceded by John B. Beliveau	Mayor of Lewiston, Maine; 1971–1973	Succeeded by John C. Orestis
Maine Senate
Preceded by William H. Clifford Jr.	Member of the Maine Senate from the 13th district 1973–1977	Succeeded by Thomas M. Mangan
Legal offices
Preceded by Joseph E. Brennan	Associate Justice of the Maine Supreme Judicial Court; 1986–2009	Succeeded by Joseph Jabar
