= Ellen Krug =

American lawyer

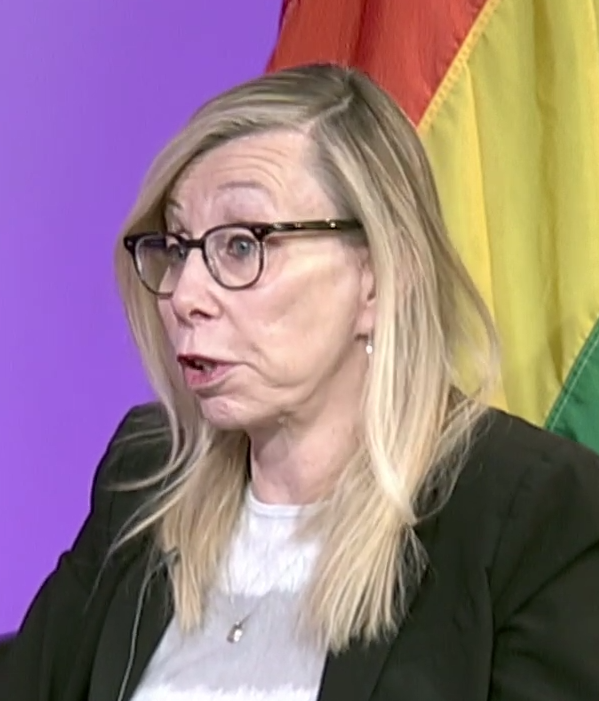
- Born: December 28, 1956 (age 69); Newark, New Jersey, U.S.
- Education: Coe College (BA); Boston College (JD)
- Occupation: Lawyer
- Spouse: Lydia
- Children: 2

Ellen Jean Krug (born December 28, 1956, in Newark, New Jersey) is an American transgender activist, author, and lawyer. In 2009, two months after coming out as a trans woman, she became the first attorney in Iowa to engage in jury trials in separate genders.

== Early life, education, and career ==
Krug's family moved to Cedar Rapids, Iowa when she was eleven years old. She graduated from Coe College in Cedar Rapids in 1979 and later earned a Juris Doctor degree from Boston College Law School (1982). She originally practiced law in Boston, Massachusetts and then later returned to Iowa where she ultimately opened and oversaw her own law firm which specialized in civil trials from 1996 to 2010. In March 2010, Krug relocated to Minneapolis, Minnesota where she now lives and works.

== Author and activist ==
Krug is the author of Getting to Ellen: A Memoir about Love, Honesty and Gender Change, published in February, 2013 (Stepladder Press). In February, 2010, Krug became a contributing author to ACCESSline, an Iowa-based monthly publication that covered lesbian, gay, bisexual and transgender (LGBT) topics of interest. Krug later became a columnist for a Minneapolis LGBT publication, Lavender Magazine, in August 2011; her column, Skirting the Issues, received a Gold Medal Award for Excellence from the Minnesota Magazine and Publishing Association in 2013. Collectively, Krug’s columns total more than 80,000 published words. Krug began speaking on transgender and LGBT topics in 2011 and continues to present on those subjects and as a motivational speaker in various venues nationally, including Iowa Public Radio. In November 2013, Krug presented a keynote address to Iowa State University on Transgender Day of Remembrance. Krug was recognized as a Lavender Magazine Community Award honoree in October 2014.

Krug is the author of "We Hear You Knocking: An Essay on Welcoming 'Trans' Lawyers", published in the William Mitchell Law Review.

Krug has been featured in various media contexts including HuffPost, the Minneapolis Star Tribune, Lion's Roar, and Iowa Public Radio. She has been a commentator on Minnesota Public Radio and interviewed on various television venues including KSTP and Fox.

== Radio host ==
In January 2017, Krug launched a weekly radio show, "Hidden Edges Radio with Ellen Krug" on KTNF in the Twin Cities, making Krug one of the few transgender radio hosts in the world.

== Nonprofit executive director ==
In December 2011, Krug began as the first executive director of a Minneapolis nonprofit, Call for Justice, LLC, which helps persons earning lower incomes connect with attorneys. Krug's role with Call for Justice, LLC made her the only transgender person to head a Minneapolis nonprofit which is not devoted to LGBT-related causes.

In early 2015, Call for Justice LLC was conferred an American Bar Association award for innovatively increasing legal access.

== Human Inspiration Works ==
In December 2016, Krug left her nonprofit position to launch Human Inspiration Works, a diversity and inclusion training company. Since then, Krug has presented her trade-marked human inclusivity training "Gray Area Thinking" across the U.S. and in Canada to colleges and universities, major corporations, court and judicial systems, governmental entities, and nonprofit organizations. She has also created a monthly e-newsletter that focuses on human inclusivity, The Ripple, with 3,000 subscribers. Krug’s work involves traveling by automobile to speak and train on inclusivity and human rights in some of the 30 states where transgender persons lack legal rights.

== Personal life ==
Krug and Lydia are the parents of two adult daughters. Her personal struggle with gender identity and self-acceptance are chronicled in her memoir and various columns.
