= Warren Silver =

American judge

Associate Justice of the Maine Supreme Judicial Court
- In office July 30, 2005 – December 31, 2014
- Appointed by: John Baldacci
- Preceded by: Paul L. Rudman
- Succeeded by: Thomas E. Humphrey

Personal details
- Born: Warren Max Silver; February 4, 1948 (age 78) Presque Isle, Maine, U.S.
- Education: Tufts University (B.A.); American University (J.D.)

Warren Max Silver (born February 4, 1948, in Presque Isle, Maine) is an American lawyer and state supreme court justice.

Silver attended Presque Isle High School and earned his undergraduate degree at Tufts University. He followed his undergraduate work by studying law at American University's Washington College of Law. After his graduation in 1973, Silver returned to Maine, and in 1977, established a law practice in Bangor, Maine.

Silver operated his practice, during which he represented Stephen King and served on the Board of Governors of the Maine Trial Lawyers Association and as Chairman of the Maine Supreme Judicial Court's Civil Rules Committee, until early July 2005 when he sold it and its building to Cuddy and Lanham, another Bangor-based law firm. Silver also earned a seat on the Bangor Museum and Center for History board of directors.

He was nominated by Governor John Baldacci to replace Justice Paul L. Rudman who retired at the start of July 2005. On July 30, 2005, Silver was sworn in as the 106th associate justice of the Maine Supreme Judicial Court. He retired from the court on December 31, 2014.
