= Abraham M. Rudman =

American judge (1896–1970)

Abraham Moses Rudman (July 1, 1896 – September 30, 1970) was an American judge who was a justice of the Maine Supreme Judicial Court from March 1, 1965, to December 14, 1966.

Born in Bangor, Maine, Rudman graduated from the University of Maine School of Law in 1917, and served in the United States Navy during World War I. Rudman was appointed to the Superior Court in 1954. Appointed to the Maine Supreme Court by Governor Burton Cross, Rudman was the first Jewish justice to serve on that Court. His son Paul Rudman later served on the same court.

Political offices
Preceded by Cecil J. Siddall	Justice of the Maine Supreme Judicial Court; 1965–1966	Succeeded by Randolph Weatherbee
