= William J. Kayatta Jr. =

American judge (born 1953)

William Kayatta
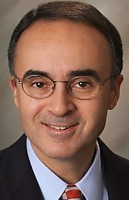

Senior Judge of the United States Court of Appeals for the First Circuit
- Incumbent
- Assumed office October 31, 2024

Judge of the United States Court of Appeals for the First Circuit
- In office February 14, 2013 – October 31, 2024
- Appointed by: Barack Obama
- Preceded by: Kermit Lipez
- Succeeded by: Joshua Dunlap

Personal details
- Born: William Joseph Kayatta Jr. 1953 (age 72–73) Pawtucket, Rhode Island, U.S.
- Education: Amherst College (BA); Harvard University (JD)

William Joseph Kayatta Jr. (born 1953) is an American lawyer who serves as a senior United States circuit judge of the United States Court of Appeals for the First Circuit.

== Early life and education ==
Kayatta was born in Pawtucket, Rhode Island, in 1953. He earned a Bachelor of Arts degree in 1976 from Amherst College and then earned a Juris Doctor, magna cum laude, in 1979 from Harvard Law School. After law school, he served as a law clerk for Chief Judge Frank M. Coffin of the United States Court of Appeals for the First Circuit from 1979 to 1980.

== Professional career ==
In 1980, Kayatta joined the Portland, Maine, law firm Pierce Atwood LLP as an associate. He became partner in 1986 and has focused his practice on complex trial and appellate litigation. He also has argued two cases before the Supreme Court of the United States. In 2010, he served as the lead investigator for the American Bar Association committee that reviewed the qualifications of Supreme Court nominee Elena Kagan. In April 2011, the Supreme Court of the United States appointed him to serve as special master in an interstate water-rights dispute, Kansas v. Nebraska and Colorado. Approximately four years later, after he had become a judge, the United States Supreme Court adopted his Special Master's Report in full.

He has served as president of the Maine Bar Foundation. In 2010, the Maine Bar Foundation presented him with the Howard H. Dana Award for his career-long pro bono efforts on behalf of low-income Maine citizens. He has also received special recognition awards from the Disability Rights Center of Maine, the Maine Equal Justice Partners, and the Maine Children's Alliance for his pro bono representation of disabled Maine children. Kayatta is also a former Chair of the Professional Ethics Commission for Maine lawyers.

== Federal judicial service ==
On January 23, 2012, President Barack Obama nominated Kayatta to serve as a United States Circuit Judge of the United States Court of Appeals for the First Circuit. Kayatta nominated to a seat vacated by Judge Kermit Lipez, who assumed senior status at the end of 2011. He received a hearing before the Senate Judiciary Committee on March 14, 2012, and his nomination was reported to the floor on April 19, 2012, by voice vote, with Senators Jeff Sessions and Mike Lee recorded as voting no.

Kayatta's confirmation hearing before the Senate Judiciary Committee was uncontroversial. His nomination needed only confirmation by the full Senate, but the process was stalled by GOP filibusters for a series of tactical reasons, such as to block the consideration of another of President Obama's judicial appointments, Robert E. Bacharach. With the adjournment of the Senate session on January 2, 2013, the nomination expired.

On January 3, 2013, he was renominated to the same judgeship. On February 7, 2013, the Senate Judiciary Committee reported his nomination to the floor by voice vote, with Senator Jeff Sessions recorded as a no vote. The Senate confirmed his nomination on February 13, 2013, by a 88–12 vote. He received his commission on February 14, 2013. Kayatta assumed senior status on October 31, 2024.

=== Notable cases ===
In August 2017, Kayatta wrote for the divided en banc circuit when it rejected a lawsuit seeking to give Puerto Ricans the right to vote, over the dissents of Judges Lipez, Juan R. Torruella, and O. Rogeriee Thompson.

In April 2020, Kayatta wrote for the unanimous panel when it found that the Board of Immigration Appeals had erred in denying asylum in the United States to a domestic abuse survivor without considering her particular allegations.

In July 2020, Kayatta wrote for a 2–1 appellate court majority that tossed out the death sentence and overturned three of the firearm convictions of Boston Marathon bomber, Dzhokhar Tsarnaev. The court cited errors in the sentencing proceedings that found Tsarnaev guilty and condemned him to death. In a 6–3 vote in March 2022, the U.S. Supreme Court reversed that decision and reinstated the death penalty for Tsarnaev.

In January 2024, Kayatta wrote for a unanimous appellate panel that reinstated a lawsuit brought by the country of Mexico against seven American gun manufacturers and one American gun distributor. The lawsuit alleged that Mexico and its citizens have been "victimized by a deadly flood of military-style and other particularly lethal guns that flows from the U.S. across the border, into criminal hands in Mexico" and that this harm was the "foreseeable result" of defendants' actions and business practices. However, the lawsuit had been thrown out by the trial court due to the Protection of Lawful Commerce in Arms Act (PLCAA). In reinstating that lawsuit, Kayatta wrote that exceptions within the PLCAA would permit the lawsuit to go forward, based on the view that some of Mexico's claims fit within PLCAA's "predicate" exception (the manufacture and sale of guns in the United States proximately caused Mexico's injuries and constituted aiding and abetting firearms trafficking in violation of federal law). The Supreme Court granted certiorari in October 2024 to review this decision, and its decision is still pending.

Legal offices
Preceded by Kermit Lipez	Judge of the United States Court of Appeals for the First Circuit; 2013–2024	Succeeded by Joshua Dunlap
