= Donald G. Alexander =

American lawyer and judge

Justice of the Maine Supreme Judicial Court
- In office September 2, 1998 – January 31, 2020
- Appointed by: Angus King
- Preceded by: Kermit Lipez
- Succeeded by: Andrew M. Horton

Personal details
- Born: March 28, 1942 (age 84) Lowell, Massachusetts, U.S.
- Education: Bowdoin College; University of Chicago Law School (JD)

Donald Gilbert Alexander (born March 28, 1942) is an American lawyer and former justice on the Maine Supreme Judicial Court.

== Biography ==
Alexander was born in Lowell, Massachusetts, the son of Donald C. and Ruth Bachelor Alexander, and grew up in Nahant, Massachusetts. He graduated from Bowdoin College and the University of Chicago Law School, serving in Washington, D.C. as an assistant to Maine Senator Edmund Muskie and as Legislative Counsel for the National League of Cities.

Alexander was appointed to the Maine Supreme Judicial Court in 1998 by Governor Angus King. He previously served on the Maine Superior Court and the Maine District Court and as a Deputy Attorney General for the State of Maine. He is the author of The Maine Jury Instruction Manual (4th. ed. 2008); and Maine Appellate Practice (3rd. ed. 2008), and a principal editor of The Maine Rules of Civil Procedure with Advisory Committee Notes and Practice Commentary (2008).

He has been an adjunct faculty member at the University of Maine School of Law and has been on the faculty of the Harvard Law School Trial Advocacy Workshop since 1980. He is the Court's liaison to the Advisory Committees on the Maine Rules of Civil Procedure and Probate Procedure, the State Court Library Committee, and the Maine State Bar Association Continuing Legal Education Committee.

Justice Alexander has dissented more than any current or former member of the Maine Supreme Judicial Court.

He retired from active service on January 31, 2020.

== See also ==
- List of justices of the Maine Supreme Judicial Court

Legal offices
Preceded by Kermit Lipez	Justice of the Maine Supreme Judicial Court; 1998–2020	Succeeded by Andrew M. Horton
