= Ellen Gorman =

American judge

Justice of the Maine Supreme Judicial Court
- In office October 1, 2007 – March 18, 2022
- Appointed by: John Baldacci
- Preceded by: Susan W. Calkins
- Succeeded by: Rick E. Lawrence

Personal details
- Born: November 9, 1955 (age 70)
- Education: Trinity Washington University (BA); Cornell University (JD)

Ellen Ann Gorman (born November 9, 1955) is an American attorney and judge who served as a justice of the Maine Supreme Judicial Court from 2007 to 2022.

== Education ==
Gorman graduated from Trinity Washington University with a Bachelor of Arts in 1977 and Cornell University Law School with a Juris Doctor in 1982. She was admitted to the Maine Bar in 1982.

== Career ==
Gorman worked in private practice with the Portland firm Richardson, Tyler & Troubh before being appointed by governor John R. McKernan Jr. to serve on the Maine District Court in 1989. She has also been a member of the Maine Judicial Education Committee and the Maine Workers Compensation Commission.

After 11 years on the District Court, governor Angus King appointed Gorman to the Maine Superior Court. On October 1, 2007, governor John Baldacci appointed her to the Maine Supreme Judicial Court. She was reappointed for a second term in 2015 by governor Paul LePage. Gorman retired on March 18, 2022, when her term ended.

== Personal life ==
Gorman is a resident of Auburn, Maine.

Political offices
| Preceded by Susan W. Calkins | Justice of the Maine Supreme Judicial Court; 2007–2022 | Succeeded by Rick E. Lawrence |
