= Randolph Weatherbee =

American judge (1907–1976)

Randolph Adams Weatherbee (December 9, 1907 – May 20, 1976) was an American lawyer and judge who served as the 80th Associate Justice of the Maine Supreme Court from December 21, 1966 until his death on May 20, 1976.

== Biography ==
Born in Portland, Weatherbee graduated from Bates College, in Lewiston, Maine with a Bachelor of Arts in 1932, and received his J.D. from Cornell Law School, gaining admission to the bar in Maine in 1937. A Republican, he served three terms in the Maine House of Representatives, where he chaired the judiciary committee, and "championed a state lottery bill and he won passage of a measure which reformed professional boxing" in the state. In 1940, he was elected county attorney for Penobscot County, Maine, an din 1943 he declared his candidacy for the office of judge of probate for the county.

In 1966, Governor John H. Reed elevated Weatherbee to a seat on the state supreme court vacated by the resignation of Abraham M. Rudman. Weatherbee was reappointed in 1973.

Weatherbee and his wife, Barbara, had one son and one daughter.

Weatherbee died in a Bangor, Maine, hospital following a heart attack at the age of 68.

Political offices
Preceded by Abraham M. Rudman	Justice of the Maine Supreme Judicial Court; 1966–1976	Succeeded by Edward S. Godfrey
