= Joseph Jabar =

American judge (born 1946)

Associate Justice of the Maine Supreme Judicial Court
- In office September 1, 2009 – January 31, 2024
- Appointed by: John Baldacci
- Preceded by: Robert W. Clifford
- Succeeded by: Julia M. Lipez

Personal details
- Born: July 9, 1946 (age 79); Waterville, Maine, U.S.
- Education: Colby College (BA); University of Maine (JD)

Joseph Michael Jabar (born July 9, 1946) is an American lawyer who served as an associate justice of the Maine Supreme Judicial Court from 2009 to 2024. He was appointed to the bench in 2009, after serving as a judge on the Superior Court. He was not reappointed to serve on the court and resigned on January 31, 2024.

== Early years and athletic career ==
A native of Waterville, Maine, Jabar attended Waterville High School, where he was captain of the football team and co-captain of the basketball and baseball teams, earning all-state honors in football. He went on to attend Colby College, graduating in 1968.

Jabar played college baseball at Colby under legendary coach John Winkin. A right-handed pitcher, Jabar served as team co-captain, and eventually had his jersey retired by the team. While at Colby, Jabar played collegiate summer baseball in the Cape Cod Baseball League (CCBL), pitching for the league's Yarmouth team in 1965, and for Chatham in 1966 and 1967. Over three seasons in the CCBL, Jabar posted a 21–4 record, and won the league's Outstanding Pitcher Award in 1966 and 1967. In 1967, his catcher at Chatham was future New York Yankees all-star Thurman Munson. Munson was the CCBL's MVP and batting champion, and the battery of Jabar and Munson led Chatham to its first league championship. Jabar was inducted into the CCBL Hall of Fame in 2003, and served as honorary captain at the CCBL All-Star Game at Fenway Park in 2011.

After graduating from Colby, Jabar signed as a free agent with the Seattle Pilots, and played in 1969 with Seattle's Single A affiliate Newark Co-Pilots of the New York–Penn League. He posted a 10–4 record with a 3.99 ERA in 106 innings at Newark under manager Earl Torgeson. After just one professional season, Jabar returned to his studies, graduating in 1971 from the University of Maine School of Law. While in law school, Jabar coached basketball at Andover Institute, and also coached the freshman team at the University of Southern Maine. In 2017, he was inducted into the Maine Sports Legends Hall of Fame.

== Legal career ==
Following graduation, Jabar served as a federal prosecutor for the Justice Department in Washington, D.C. He returned to Maine and served four years as District Attorney for Kennebec County and Somerset County. For twenty-five years he was a member of the law firm of Jabar, Batten, Ringer and Murphy of Waterville.

== Judicial career ==
He was appointed to the Superior Court in 2001 by Governor Angus King and he was re-appointed by Governor John Baldacci in 2008. He was appointed to the Maine Supreme Judicial Court by Governor John Baldacci on September 1, 2009, and was reappointed in 2016. He left office on January 31, 2024.
