= Robert B. Williamson =

American judge

Robert Byron Williamson (August 23, 1899 – December 27, 1976) was a Maine judge.

== Career ==
In 1949, Williamson was appointed by Governor Frederick G. Payne to serve as a Justice of the Maine Supreme Judicial Court. In 1956, Governor Edmund Muskie appointed Williamson Chief Justice of the court until his retirement in 1970. He graduated from Harvard College in 1920 and Harvard Law School in 1923.

== Personal ==
Williamson was the great grandson of Maine Senate President Joseph Williamson and the grandson of Governor Edwin C. Burleigh. He was admitted to Augusta General Hospital's coronary care unit on December 23, 1976, and died on December 27, 1976. In 2004, the Williamson Family Papers were given to the University of Maine. The papers are kept at the Raymond H. Fogler Library in Orono.
