= Robert Hale (Maine politician) =

American politician (1889–1976)

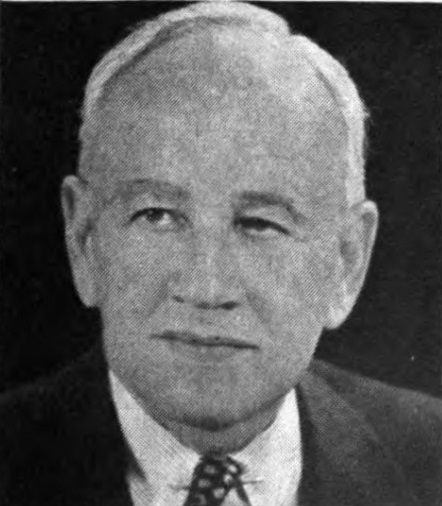

Member of the U.S. House of Representatives from Maine's 1st district
- In office January 3, 1943 – January 3, 1959
- Preceded by: James C. Oliver
- Succeeded by: James C. Oliver

71st Speaker of the Maine House of Representatives
- In office 1929–1930
- Preceded by: Burleigh Martin
- Succeeded by: E. Delmont Merrill

Member of the Maine House of Representatives
- In office 1926–1930

Personal details
- Born: November 29, 1889 Portland, Maine, U.S.
- Died: November 30, 1976 (aged 87) Washington, D.C., U.S.
- Resting place: Evergreen Cemetery
- Party: Republican
- Parent: Clarence Hale (father)
- Relatives: Frederick Hale (cousin)
- Education: Bowdoin College; University of Oxford; Harvard University

Robert Hale (November 29, 1889 – November 30, 1976) was a U.S. representative from Maine, and first cousin of U.S. Senator Frederick Hale, also of Maine. A conservative, internationalist, and self-described reactionary, he was known for his unwavering advocacy of civil rights and opposition against the Ku Klux Klan.

== Biography ==
Born in Portland, Maine, to Clarence Hale (U.S. District Judge, Maine) and Margret Jordan Rollins, Hale attended the public schools. He graduated from Portland High School in 1906, from Bowdoin College, Brunswick, Maine, in 1910, and from Oxford University, where he was a Rhodes Scholar, in 1912. He attended Harvard Law School in 1913 and 1914. He was admitted to the Massachusetts bar in 1914, the Maine bar in 1917, and the District of Columbia bar in 1959. Practiced in Portland, Maine, from 1917 to 1942. During the First World War served in the United States Army in grades up to second lieutenant, with overseas service from 1917 to 1919.

=== In the Maine House: Opposition to the Barwise Bill and the Ku Klux Klan ===
Hale served in the Maine House of Representatives 1923–1930, and was elected as Speaker in 1929–1930. In 1923 and 1925 he was instrumental in defeating the Barwise Bill, a measure supported by the majority of his party, which would have changed the Maine Constitution to outlaw all state aid to parochial schools. The bill (introduced and defeated twice) was strongly opposed by Maine's Catholic population, and just as strongly favored by the Ku Klux Klan whose state headquarters and center of support was in Hale's home city of Portland. The measure split the Maine Republican Party and embroiled state politics for three years. It was favored by Governor Owen Brewster but opposed by a faction that included Hale and his cousin, U.S. senator Frederick Hale, whose seat Brewster would eventually (but unsuccessfully) contest.

In leading the 1923 debate against the Barwise Bill, Hale said it was "conceived in intolerance against the Roman Catholic Church" and related that he "knew of a person (in Europe). . . who was killed for the only reason that he was a Jew". He then read extracts from speeches by the King Kleagle of the Maine Ku Klux Klan, F. Eugene Farnsworth, calling him "an ignorant demagogue." In his 1925 speech against a new version of the same bill, Hale cited examples of recent intolerance in American political life, including the rejection of German language teaching during World War I and Tennessee's law against the teaching of evolution. Referring again to the Ku Klux Klan of Maine, who had demonstrated their strength during a recent Maine State Senate debate on the same bill, Hale said that only the defeat of the Barwise measure would "appease this hysteria." Hale was a convincing champion of the anti-Barwise forces because he was a Protestant Republican from Portland, a Klan hotbed. The bill was defeated, but Hale's opposition to it likely defeated his own initial bid to become Speaker of the Maine House of Representatives in 1926. Hale made a second successful bid for the House Speakership in 1929, by which time the Klan was a spent force in the Maine Republican Party.

=== U.S. Congress: The New Deal and Cold War Years ===
Hale was elected as a Republican to the Seventy-eighth and seven succeeding U.S. Congresses (January 3, 1943 – January 3, 1959).

In the war-time election of 1942, Hale used his support for Roosevelt's foreign policy to unseat Congressman James C. Oliver, who was a pre-war isolationist, in the Republican primary. In the general election, however, Hale was called a "disciple of hate" by his opponent, former Democratic Governor of Maine Louis J. Brann, because of an article he'd written for Harper's Magazine in 1936 entitled "I Too Hate Roosevelt" and criticizing the New Deal. Brann went so far as to claim that a Hale victory would "please Hitler." Hale started his own congressional service with equally alarmist rhetoric, telling an audience in Oct. 1942 that they could expect Roosevelt to "abolish Congress" within the next four years.

In April 1943, Hale criticized Wendell Willkie for "shooting off his face about India."

During the early Cold War, Hale supported the formation and role of the United Nations, but was otherwise on the staunchly conservative wing of the Republican Party during the presidency of Harry S. Truman. In 1950, he said of Sen. Joseph McCarthy: "people should give him credit for what he is trying to do instead of carping on his methods," a position opposite to that of his Maine Republican colleague Sen. Margaret Chase Smith, who was an early critic of McCarthyism. He also defended Gen. Douglas MacArthur when he was fired by Truman, claiming MacArthur "has always been right" about the "Far Eastern situation," and introduced a resolution to impeach Truman after the president nationalized steel mills in 1952. On the other hand, he advised against the use of atomic bombs in the Korean War while his more liberal colleague Sen. Smith joined right-wing Maine Sen. Owen Brewster in sanctioning their use against Communist China "if necessary." Hale voted in favor of the Civil Rights Act of 1957.

Hale's last election victory, in 1956, saw him winning by only 29 votes out of over 100,000 cast. His Democratic Party opponent was James C. Oliver, who, as a Republican, Hale had unseated for the same congressional seat in 1942. Oliver ran against Hale again in 1958 and this time won back the seat he'd occupied 26 years before. Hale afterwards resumed the practice of law in Washington, D.C. He died on November 30, 1976, in Washington, D.C., and is interred in Evergreen Cemetery in Portland, Maine.

U.S. House of Representatives
Preceded by James C. Oliver	Member of the U.S. House of Representatives from Maine's 1st congressional district 1943-1959	Succeeded by James C. Oliver
