= John Smith (Maine politician) =

American politician

John Gilpatric Smith (June 9, 1874 – February 11, 1936) was an American politician from Maine. Smith was elected mayor of Saco, Maine in 1924 during the peak of electoral success for the Ku Klux Klan in Maine politics. He was appointed Commissioner of Banking by Governor Owen Brewster in 1927. He, along with Governor Brewster, State Senator Hodgdon Buzzell were among the most prominent of the state's politicians who were supported by the Klan.

== Gubernatorial campaign ==
Smith declared his candidature for governor of Maine in November 1927. He pledged not to raise money nor to "blow his own horn." In a pre-election advertisement, Smith argued against exporting hydroelectricity. In June 1928, Smith, then a resident of Waterville, lost the Maine Republican Party primary for Governor to William Tudor Gardiner. Smith finished in fourth and last place, earning 8,810 (10.16%). After his defeat in the gubernatorial primary and Brewster's defeat in the concurrent Senate primary, Klan leader DeForest H. Perkins resigned his position.

== Personal ==
Smith was born in Kennebunk, Maine. He was married and had 10 children. He died on February 11, 1936, in Kennebunk.
