= Percival P. Baxter =

American politician (1876–1969)

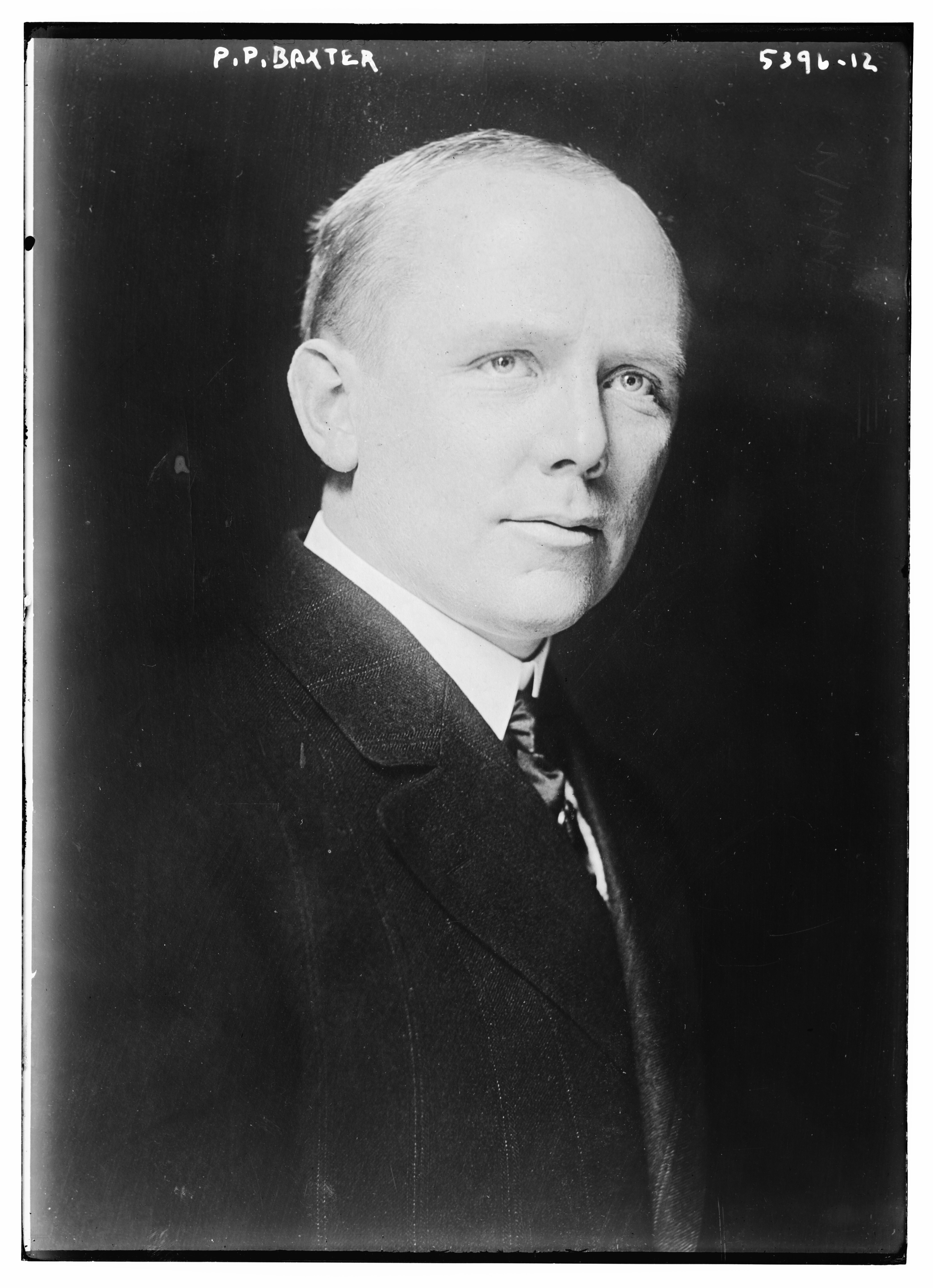
- Official portrait, 1900

53rd Governor of Maine
- In office January 31, 1921 – January 7, 1925
- Preceded by: Frederic Hale Parkhurst
- Succeeded by: Ralph Owen Brewster

77th President of the Maine Senate
- In office January 5, 1921 – January 31, 1921
- Preceded by: Leon F. Higgins
- Succeeded by: Frank G. Farrington

Member of the Maine Senate from the 2nd district
- In office January 1, 1919 – January 31, 1921
- Constituency: Cumberland County
- In office 1909–1911
- Constituency: Cumberland County

Member of the Maine House of Representatives from Portland
- In office 1916–1919

Personal details
- Born: Percival Proctor Baxter; November 22, 1876 Portland, Maine, U.S.
- Died: June 12, 1969 (aged 92) Portland, Maine, U.S.
- Party: Republican
- Education: Bowdoin College (AB); Harvard Law School (LLB)

Percival Proctor Baxter (November 22, 1876 – June 12, 1969) was an American politician and philanthropist from Maine. A Republican, Baxter served as the 53rd governor of Maine from 1921 to 1925. He was the son of canning magnate and Portland, Maine mayor James Phinney Baxter. A noted philanthropist, he donated several pieces of land into the public domain including Baxter Woods (Portland), Mackworth Island State Park (Falmouth), and Baxter State Park (Piscataquis County).

== Early life ==
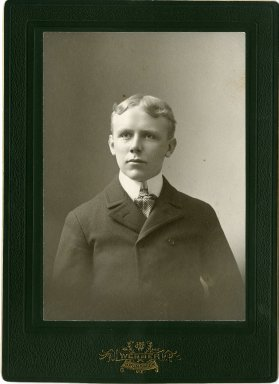
Percival Proctor Baxter, Bowdoin College class of 1898

Baxter was born in a wealthy family in Portland where his father James Phinney Baxter served six terms as mayor and had made his fortune in the canning industry. He graduated from Portland High School in 1894, and graduated from Bowdoin College with honors in 1898. While at Bowdoin, Baxter founded the school's literary magazine, The Quill. He later earned a law degree from Harvard University in 1901, though he never opened a legal practice. He went into the family real estate business in Portland. He had seven siblings. However, he was to inherit the bulk of the family fortune.

When Baxter was governor he donated to the people of Maine a large parcel of forest land which became Baxter State Park. He said "Man is born to die. His works are short-lived. Buildings crumble, monuments decay, and wealth vanishes, but Katahdin in all its glory forever shall remain the mountain of the people of Maine."

Baxter was also a fierce opponent of the Ku Klux Klan of Maine, which supported the career of his political nemesis and successor Ralph Owen Brewster.

== Electoral history ==
- Maine State Senate – 1909–1910
- Maine House of Representatives – 1916–1919
- Maine State Senate – 1919–1921 (President in 1921)
- Governor of Maine – 1921–1924 (succeeded upon death of Governor Frederic Hale Parkhurst and then elected to one term
- Unsuccessful run for U.S. Senate – 1926

== Baxter State Park ==
Baxter's history is intertwined with Baxter State Park, which bears his name, and with Mount Katahdin, Maine's highest point (the highest knob on Katahdin is called Baxter Peak).

In 1903 Baxter went on a fishing trip to the area around Katahdin for the first time. In 1895 the Maine Proprietors Association had urged the state to turn that area of the Maine woods into a state park to attract tourists. In 1911 a bill was introduced to turn the region into a U.S. National Park but none of the plans came to fruition. In 1916 Baxter began his campaign to make the area a state park. In 1920 he led a group of politicians up Pamola Peak, traversing the Knife Edge to the summit (now known as Baxter Peak).

In a 1921 speech, Baxter said:

Maine is famous for its twenty-five hundred miles of seacoast, with its countless islands; for its myriad lakes and ponds; and for its forests and rivers. But Mount Katahdin Park will be the state's crowning glory, a worthy memorial to commemorate the end of the first and the beginning of the second century of Maine's statehood. This park will prove a blessing to those who follow us, and they will see that we built for them more wisely than our forefathers did for us.

Most of the land around Katahdin was then owned by the Great Northern Paper Company. Following the Crash of 1929, the company agreed to sell 6,000 acres (24 km^{2}) around the mountain for $25,000 in 1930 to Baxter personally. Baxter in turn deeded the land to the state with the proviso that it: "shall forever be used for public park and recreational purposes, shall be forever left in the natural wild state, shall forever be kept as a sanctuary for wild beasts and birds, that no road or ways for motor vehicles shall hereafter ever be constructed thereon or therein."

The park was named in his honor in 1931.

Baxter was to continue to attempt to add property to the park—often running into opposition from those who did not want to sell or making temporary trade offs to allow continued timber operations before the land acquisition was completed. Baxter, saying he did not trust the federal government, resisted efforts to turn the park into a national park. He placed various restrictive covenants on the park so that today it is not actually part of the Department of Conservation, the body that administers the state's other parks. Rather it is administered by the Baxter State Park Authority.

In 1962 Baxter, at the age of 87, donated his 28th deed. The park now comprises 314 square miles (810 km^{2}). Baxter, who died a bachelor, left $7 million to maintain the park.

== Baxter vs. the Klan ==
Baxter's term as Governor coincided with the rise of the Ku Klux Klan as a force in Maine and national politics. Although Baxter was an ardent foe of the Klan, it found a foothold in the Maine Republican Party through the influence of state senators Ralph O. Brewster, Mark Alton Barwise, Hodgdon Buzzell, and others, who sponsored bills in the early 1920s which would have cut aid to parochial schools, thus creating a 'wedge issue' between Maine's Protestant and Catholic communities. Brewster succeeded Baxter as governor in 1925. In 1928, when Brewster ran for the U.S. Senate, Baxter publicly denounced him as a member of the Klan, helping to ensure the victory of incumbent U.S. Senator Frederick Hale.

== Other activities ==
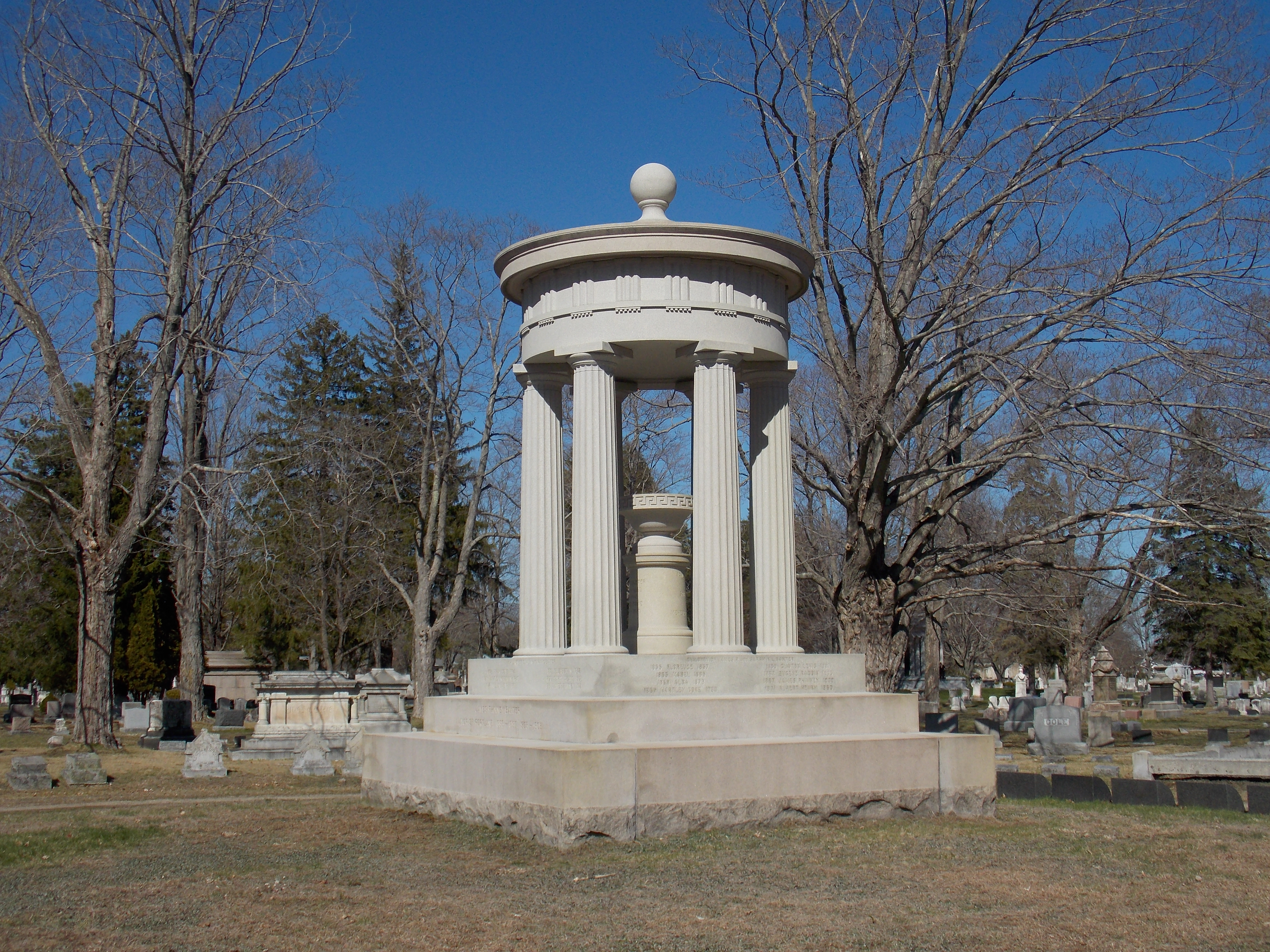
The Baxter Family Monument in Evergreen Cemetery.

In 1896, Baxter joined a number of his Bowdoin classmates and travelled to Bath, Maine, where the Democratic candidate for president, William Jennings Bryan, was scheduled to speak. Baxter and his crew were so raucous that they were arrested. Although Baxter's confederates pleaded guilty, the future Governor fought the charges with the help of his father, Portland Mayor James Phinney Baxter, and managed to have his record expunged.

In 1953 Baxter donated Mackworth Island to the state. He also deeded his summer home in Falmouth, Maine to create the Governor Baxter School for the Deaf (founded in 1957 from what was the Maine School for the Deaf), which still operates today.

Baxter was known for his passionate devotion to animals, and for his commitment to the humane treatment of animals. When his dog, Garry, died while Baxter was governor, he ordered the flag at the State House lowered to half staff, which angered some veterans' groups. Baxter belonged to several humane societies across the country, one of which, the New England Anti-Vivisection Society, called him "America's greatest humane governor."

Following the death of Theodore F. Green of Rhode Island on May 19, 1966, Baxter became the oldest living former US governor.

Baxter died in Portland, and his ashes were scattered in the park.

Party political offices
Preceded by Frederic Hale Parkhurst	Republican nominee for Governor of Maine; 1922	Succeeded by Ralph Owen Brewster
Political offices
Preceded by Frederic Hale Parkhurst	Governor of Maine; 1921–1925	Succeeded by Ralph Owen Brewster
