= Charles Perkins (Maine politician) =

American legislator (1840-1907)

Charles Henry Perkins (c. 1840–June 8, 1907) was an American state legislator, sea captain, and farmer from Maine. He was elected to one term in the Maine House of Representatives as a Republican (1885–86).

Perkins was born in North Brooksville, Maine and attended the common schools. At the age of 13, Perkins began working as a common sailor and mate. At the age of 19 in 1859, he became a ship captain, a position he held until 1875. After retiring from the sea, he became a farmer. He was also the manager of the Grange cooperative store. At the time of his election to the Maine House of Representatives in September 1884, Perkins had been elected the chair of the Brooksville board of selectmen for seven years.

He was the father of ten children, five of which had careers as educators. One of his children was DeForest H. Perkins, an educator who served as superintendent of schools in Skowhegan and Portland. Leaving education, he became secretary of the Portland Chamber of Commerce and then Ku Klux Klan Grand Dragon. Another of his children, Charles N. Perkins, served as the superintendent of schools in school districts across Maine, Massachusetts, and New Hampshire.
