= List of killings by law enforcement officers in the United States, September 2014 =

This is a list of people reported killed by non-military law enforcement officers in the United States in September 2014, whether in the line of duty or not, and regardless of reason or method. The listing documents the occurrence of a death, making no implications regarding wrongdoing or justification on the part of the person killed or officer involved. Killings are arranged by date of the incident that caused death. Different death dates, if known, are noted in the description. The table below lists 76 people.

== September 2014 ==
Date	Name (Age) of Deceased	Race	State (City)	Description
2014-09-30	David Kedra (26)	White	Pennsylvania (Philadelphia)	A state trooper was accidentally shot during a gun training exercise at the Montgomery County Public Safety Training Complex and later died. In 2015, the officer who shot Kedra, Richard Schroeter, was charged with five counts of recklessly endangering a person.
2014-09-30	Randall Garfield Williams (40)	White	Wyoming (Casper)	Two Casper Police officers and a Wyoming Highway Patrolman responded to a domestic dispute then shot and killed a man who they claim pointed two handguns at them. According to family, the man was intoxicated and took medications for mental illness.
2014-09-30	Javonta Darden (20)	Black	Georgia (Athens)	Police reported Darden and a colleague shot and wounded an ATF agent during "an undercover law enforcement operation." Officers shot and killed Darden.
2014-09-30	Marlon S. Woodstock (38)	Black	Florida (Sunrise)	Friends of Woodstock called police for help and told them he was suffering from mental illness. Officers said Woodstock ran after being ordered to stop. After failed attempts at subduing him with a Taser and then a K-9, an officer shot him. "Ultimately, one officer was forced to discharge his firearm," said a police spokesperson.
2014-09-29	Rafael Laureano (51)	Hispanic	New York (Brooklyn)	Francisco Carvajal stabbed his ex-girlfriend's new boyfriend Rafael Laureano before police arrived. He refused to drop his knife and police shot and killed both Carvajal and Laureano.
2014-09-29	Francisco Carvajal (47)	Hispanic	New York (Brooklyn)	Francisco Carvajal stabbed his ex-girlfriend's new boyfriend Rafael Laureano before police arrived. He refused to drop his knife and police shot and killed both Carvajal and Laureano.
2014-09-28	Garrett, Nancy Joyce (68)		California (Bakersfield)	According to the Kern County Sheriff's Office, Garrett was killed after a deputy crashed into her vehicle; initial reports show that the deputy was on his way to assist another deputy with someone resisting arrest.
2014-09-28	Oliver Jarrod Gregoire (26)	Black	Texas (Baytown)	An unarmed robbery and assault suspect was Taser'ed twice by Chambers County Sheriff's Deputy Bradley Hasley. Texas Rangers are investigating.
2014-09-27	Eugene Williams (38)	Black	Missouri (Kansas City)	Police used a Taser on Williams; his heart had stopped by the time an ambulance arrived. Afterward police told witnesses he had taken PCP.
2014-09-27	unidentified (42)	Unknown	Florida (Homestead)	Police say they shot and killed a man who assaulted his ex-girlfriend.
2014-09-27	Shad Gerken (34)	White	Maine (Chester)	Deputies with the Penobscot County Sheriff's Office responded to a report of a man with a knife walking down Route 116 and acting erratically. After an eight-hour stand-off, the man was shot and killed. Family members describe Gerken as a person with mental illness.
2014-09-26	Dilon Chadwick McGee (18)	White	Tennessee (Madison County)	A Madison County Sheriff's deputy shot and killed McGee during a car chase.
2014-09-26	Steven Paul Presley (34)	White	Texas (Paris)	Lamar County Sheriff Scott Cass said deputies were confronted by an armed man outside the home, who allegedly started shooting at the deputies. The deputies then returned fire on the suspect who died at the scene from gunshot wounds. Texas Rangers will investigate.,
2014-09-26	Cody Dempsey (25)	White	Ohio (Warren)	Cody Dempsey was shot to death by officers after a chase. Media reports witnesses seeing Dempsey shoot at officers. Unidentified officers from the Trumbull County Sheriff's Office, Weathersfield Police and the Ohio State Highway Patrol were involved in the chase and shooting.
2014-09-25	Giovany Contreras Sandoval (34)	Hispanic	California (San Francisco)	A carjacker, Giovany Contreras Sandoval, stole a woman's Escalade in Richmond, drove to Marin County, and lead law enforcement on a chase that ended in San Francisco's Financial District. They pursued him across the Richmond-San Rafael Bridge, onto southbound U.S. Highway 101 and then over the Golden Gate Bridge. Sandoval crashed the car at a road, and a man who walked up to the scene to try to help was shot and wounded in the chest. CHP and San Francisco Police Department officers arrived at the scene of the crash, and a less-lethal bean bag gun was fired. Sandoval then took out his revolver and fired a shot at police. Six officers returned fire, hitting him 32 times.
2014-09-24	David Hooks (59)	White	Georgia (East Dublin)	Unnamed Laurens County deputies claim Hooks pointed a rifle at them when they tried to search his home. They shot and killed him.
2014-09-24	Navarre, Jacob (25)		Louisiana (DeRidder)	Louisiana State Police shot and killed a man LSP Sgt. James Anderson said tried to run them over.
2014-09-24	Nolan Anderson (50)	Black	Louisiana (New Orleans)	St. John the Baptist Parish Sheriff's deputies shot and killed a fellow deputy involved in a domestic dispute.
2014-09-24	Matthew L. Stoddard (25)	White	Washington (Pasco)	Pasco Police officer Tony Haworth shot and killed Matthew Stoddard after a foot chase. Haworth told his superiors Stoddard had a gun.
2014-09-23	Brian Eugene Rice (57)	White	South Carolina (Goose Creek)	State Constable Brian Rice pointed four guns at his wife and later at state police who shot and killed him. Later his wife described Rice as having been diagnosed with cancer and taking "several medications" which changed his personality.
2014-09-23	Joseph Adam Lee (32)	White	Indiana (Elkhart)	According to a press release, after a foot chase with a man wanted for a felony warrant Elkhart City Police officers shot and killed the man after he pointed a gun at the officers.
2014-09-23	Thomas E. Klessig (23)	White	Texas (University Park)	According to police, Klessig was "uncooperative with officers" and was pepper-sprayed. He became unresponsive and was given CPR, then was transported to the hospital, where he was pronounced dead.
2014-09-23	Cameron Tillman (14)	Black	Louisiana (New Orleans)	A high school student was shot and killed by a Terrebonne Parish Sheriff's Deputy who reported finding four juveniles in an abandoned home.
2014-09-23	John Jolley Jr. (28)	Black	Kentucky (Louisville)	Responding to a domestic dispute an unidentified Louisville Metro Police officer shot and killed a man after he reached for a gun in his car.
2014-09-22	James A. Cave (54)	White	Iowa (Davenport)	Responding to a call for help with a drunk man threatening suicide, Davenport Police Department officers first negotiated and then shot and killed the man. In August, DPD officer shot and killed a 61-year-old man with mental illness.
2014-09-22	Gustavo Segura Acosta (36)	Hispanic	California (Fresno)	Fresno Police Chief Jerry Dyer said his officers "did what they felt they needed to do" for their safety, when they shot and killed a man with "a history of drug use, mental illness" holding a pipe and involved in a domestic dispute.
2014-09-21	Shane Lambert (39)	White	Ohio (Mansfield)	Mansfield Police officers shot and killed Lambert in front of his children when he attempted to jump out of a window.
2014-09-21	Daniel Diaz (29)	Hispanic	New York (Ballston Spa)	Police say Satre was screaming and walking in front of cars when two Ballston Spa officers called for backup to help arrest him on disorderly conduct charges. Two officers from the Saratoga County Sheriff's Office and two state troopers arrived, and all six attempted to apprehend Satre, police said. Stun guns used by officers, and he became unconscious after being handcuffed. Police said officers attempted to perform CPR at the scene, but Satre was pronounced dead at Saratoga Hospital.
2014-09-20	Kela Souter (49)	White	Florida (Homosassa)	Responding to a call for help with a suicidal woman, a Citrus County Sheriff's deputy responded by pointing a gun at Souter and demanding she drop her gun. She did not and he shot and killed her.
2014-09-20	Edward P. Miller (52)	White	Florida (Daytona Beach)	Volusia County Deputy Joel Hernandez and his partner were investigating a separate incident at a business when 52-year-old Edward Miller and his son showed up and got into an argument with an employee. Deputies said Miller brandished a gun, and Hernandez perceived a threat and opened fire. Miller, who was deaf and sitting in his car, died at the scene. Hernandez' action is being investigated by the Florida Department of Law Enforcement.
2014-09-19	Steen Parker III (43)	White	California (Anaheim)	An armed-robbery suspect was killed in an exchange of gunfire with Anaheim SWAT officers during a standoff in an auto lot.
2014-09-19	Levi Weaver (18)	White	Georgia (Cedartown)	Weaver's mother told Polk County jail administrator Jerry Shellhouse that Weaver was "acting crazy" and "tearing things up." Polk County Sheriff Johnny Moats said Weaver approached an officer with a baseball bat and a knife. The deputy shot twice hitting Weaver in his chest killing him.
2014-09-19	William Smith (33)	Asian	New Mexico (Las Cruces)	A high-speed chase out of Luna County, followed by a multi-hour standoff in Las Cruces ended Friday afternoon with the armed driver shot dead by a New Mexico State Police officer
2014-09-18	Ricky Lynn Bunch Jr (40)	White	Tennessee (Grainger County)	Claiborne County Sheriff's Office described a stand-off between Bunch and law enforcement personnel, and during that time Bunch got in and out of his vehicle at various time and displayed both a pistol and a shotgun. During the confrontation, Bunch was shot by law enforcement personnel, and was pronounced deceased at the scene.
2014-09-18	Michael M. Willis Jr. (42)	Black	Georgia (Savannah)	According to police, Smith was put into a police car, where he managed to move his hands to the front of his body, and he kicked out one of the vehicle's windows. "The officers said, as Smith attempted to exit the patrol car, they saw that he had a firearm. This encounter resulted in Smith being shot and killed at the scene."
2014-09-18	Willis, Michael (42)		Missouri (Jennings)	St. Louis County police officers shot and killed a man after he pointed a rifle at them during a chase in suburban St. Louis.
2014-09-17	Brian Lee Beeler (41)	White	Iowa (Des Moines)	Officers Peter Wilson and Cody Willis shot Beeler September 17. Officers responded to a complaint about an argument at the home of Beeler's aunt. Police confronted Beeler, who had two knives in his waistband. Police said Beeler refused to show his hands and failed to follow officers' instructions to surrender so they shot him.
2014-09-17	Thomas "Tommy" McClain (22)	White	California (Eureka)	According to a Eureka Police Department press release, officers were in the area searching for two subjects wanted on felony warrants. An officer observed two men, one of whom appeared to have a handgun. Officers "confronted the man with the gun," and shot him. According to officers, McClain had a BB handgun in his waistband. In November 2014, Humboldt County's district attorney declined to file charges against the officers who shot McClain.
2014-09-16	William "Billy Buck" Buchanan Stingley Jr. (40)	White	Mississippi (Pelahatchie)	Neighbors were shooting at each other when a Rankin County deputy arrived, shot and killed Stingley. Sheriff Bryan Bailey, who was not present at the shooting, said the deputy "did the right thing."
2014-09-16	Matthew Porraz (21)	Hispanic	California (Fresno)	Porraz shot by two plainclothes officers who confronted him when he tried to escape out a back window of an apartment, according to Fresno Deputy Chief Keith Foster.
2014-09-16	Kashad Ashford (23)	Black	New Jersey (Rutherford)	Police shot and killed Ashford after a lengthy car chase.
2014-09-16	Kerry Lynn Brown (26)	Black	Washington (Lacey)	The wife of a Joint Base Lewis-McChord soldier said her husband "snapped" and had a mental episode when he fired his gun inside their home. Police said 26-year-old Sgt. Carrey Brown exited the house and fired his gun in the street, and after a brief pursuit near the home, an Thurston County deputy responded by shooting him with a rifle.
2014-09-15	Joel Allen (35)	White	Texas (Dallas)	Dallas Police Officer Michael DeWilde said Allen jumped into a car and drove into DeWilde, carrying him more than 50 yards across the parking lot. DeWilde then fired at least three times through the windshield. DeWilde then fell off the vehicle as Allen drove away.
2014-09-15	Michael Bonty (23)	Black	Alaska (Wasilla)	Wasilla Police Department police officer Andrew Kappler shot and killed a man early Monday following a 911 call reporting a domestic dispute that ended with an abrupt hang-up. Bonty's mother told reporters her son was attempting suicide.
2014-09-15	Christopher Mitchell (37)	White	Ohio (Cincinnati)	Two Cincinnati police officers shot and killed a man; but before they pointed their guns at him, he turned one on himself. "When he came out onto the porch he had the gun to his head. That's when they fired."
2014-09-14	Caesar Adams (36)	Black	Louisiana (New Orleans)	NOPD Officer Jonathan Smith said two passengers got out of the vehicle and shot him three times. Smith managed to return fire, killing Caesar Adams and wounding the other, according to the NOPD.
2014-09-14	Richard "Pedie" Perez III (24)	Hispanic	California (Richmond)	Perez was shot near a liquor store by a police officer after trying to get a hold of his gun during a fight, which lasted at least 45 seconds. Perez, and several other people, were told to leave the liquor store after they were accused of loitering there.
2014-09-13	James Bradley Phillips (43)	White	Tennessee (Pigeon Forge)	A Pigeon Forge police officer shot and killed a man wanted for questioning in connection to the murder of a Knoxville man.
2014-09-13	Jesse Aaron Gibbons (29)	White	Kentucky (Richmond)	Gibbons had unsuccessfully tried to reconcile with his estranged mother. He took her dog and allegedly pushed the front door against her while leaving. Police stopped him at a Circle K to investigate the altercation, concluding there was enough evidence to support an arrest. Bipolar Gibbons said he wouldn't go to jail for something his mother said and punched the officer in the left eye. In that struggle, the officer dropped his stun gun into Gibbons' vehicle. Gibbons then fled to Richmond where another officer began pursuit; officers were told that the stun gun might be in the vehicle. When the chase ended in a car crash, Gibbons got out of the vehicle with the taser and pointed it at officers. They believed it was a gun and fired. A standoff ensued and Gibbons eventually surrendered. At least 8 officers discharged their weapons at least 67 times (total). Gibbons's father, reviewing the investigation, says he has "no ill feelings for anyone involved in the incident."
2014-09-13	Morales, Fredi (20)		Illinois (Wheeling)	An on-duty Wheeling police officer's vehicle struck and killed a 20-year-old pedestrian Sunday morning in the northwest suburbs of Illinois.
2014-09-13	Ricky Deangelo Hinkle (47)	Black	Alabama (Birmingham)	Hinkle fell to the floor and was unresponsive after a deputy used the Taser on him, according to the statement issued by the Jefferson County Sheriff's office. Hinkle was transported to a local hospital where he was pronounced dead, according to the agency. He was in jail for parole violations.
2014-09-12	Elijah Jackson (33)	Black	Tennessee (Knoxville)	Friday morning, a deputy spotted Jackson, who was wanted as a suspect for a stabbing, in a Powell subdivision and tried to pull him over. Deputies say Jackson rammed three KCSO cars and tried to run over several officers when they shot at the vehicle.
2014-09-12	Jeffrey Johnson (33)	White	Texas (Abilene)	Abilene police report they did a welfare check at Johnson's motel room and fond nothing wrong. Johnson slammed and shot through the door. He later jumped from a second story window and fled in a silver van. Police found him in a nearby cemetery. Johnson ran down a police dog, then was shot and killed by unnamed officers.
2014-09-11	Gerald S. Cole (54)	White	Texas (San Angelo)	Cole threatened a woman via text message on September 11. Officers attempted to stop Cole, who then led them on a low-speed chase. Once stopped, Cole exited his vehicle brandishing a handgun and was shot at least once by San Angelo Police officers. Cole died on September 19.
2014-09-11	James Nicholas (40)	White	Texas (Houston)	Harris County Sheriff's Office said 48-year-old James Earl Nicholas was killed after officers with a fugitive task force tracked him to an apartment complex. Authorities say he fired on the officers as they moved to arrest him.
2014-09-11	Trujillo, Inez (42)		Texas (Duval County)	An inmate who was without his medication died, Duval County officials said. "He destroyed his medication during the altercation with his girlfriend," the official said. "He has several ailments." Trujillo was moved to an isolated jail cell Tuesday after he was seen throwing up and coughing profusely.
2014-09-11	Benjamin Jay Schroff (37)	White	Utah (St. George)	Schroff was shot and killed by St. George Police officers after a hostages were taken during a bank robbery, car and foot chase. Schroff's family released a poignant apology to the community the next day.
2014-09-10	Darrien Nathaniel Hunt (22)	Black	Utah (Saratoga Springs)	A 22-year-old Saratoga Springs man was allegedly armed with a samurai sword when fatally shot during a confrontation with officers. A private autopsy found that Hunt was shot six times in the back. Family members of Hunt have suggested that he was cosplaying a samurai character from a Japanese anime series when he was shot.
2014-09-09	Shawn Brown (20)	Black	New Jersey (Atlantic City)	Police responded to calls of multiple gun shots. Upon arrival, police encountered Shawn Brown who was armed with a semi-automatic pistol, and shot him. Police made no other details available.
2014-09-09	Christopher James Roskelley (38)	White	Utah (Ogden)	One person is dead after an officer-involved shooting occurred in Ogden Tuesday afternoon, according to Ogden police.
2014-09-08	Michael Donovan Oswald (38)	White	South Carolina (Charleston County)	Charleston County Sheriff said man who used an AK-47 rifle to shoot and kill a deputy, and injure two other deputies, died after deputies returned fire. The shooting took the life of Deputy Joseph Matuskovic, and injured Deputy Michael Ackerman who was also shot, but is expected to recover.
2014-09-08	Alphonse Edward Perkins (50)	Black	California (Los Angeles)	Officers responded to a 2 AM domestic dispute. Perkins allegedly shot a gun and the officers responded, killing Perkins. The officers were not immediately named.
2014-09-08	Benito Gonzalez (45)	Hispanic	Texas (San Patricio County)	Police say Gonzales drove his truck into the San Patricio County Sheriff's Office and started shooting. Deputies returned fire, killing him. Family members say Gonzales was depressed after a recent diagnosis of colon cancer.
2014-09-08	Tyler Caraway (24)	White	Texas (Austin)	A suspect in a bank robbery investigation was shot and killed by police officers Monday night.
2014-09-08	Christopher Shane LeBlanc (40)	White	Louisiana (Pineville)	Police said LeBlanc allegedly charged at the officers, with the weapon in hand, and one of the officers drew his gun and fired multiple times.
2014-09-07	Thomas Carberry (50)	White	Florida (Wilton Manors)	Police responded to a call of man who was threatening suicide and who also threatened to kill his two roommates and any police who tried to stop him. Before police arrived, Carberry fired multiple rounds but it is not clear who he was shooting at. Police ordered Carberry to drop his weapon multiple times but he refused and responded "do it! do it!"
2014-09-06	Davis, Thomas (44)		Hawaii (Honolulu)	An unnamed patrol officer transporting two teenagers hit and killed Davis, a man in a wheelchair. Police said Davis, who friends describe as deaf, was in a traffic lane. There are no streetlights or sidewalks where the accident happened.
2014-09-05	Steven Lee Howell (23)	White	Tennessee (Dayton)	Authorities say a Rhea County sheriff's deputy has fatally shot a man in the emergency room of the local hospital. The victim, who was injured and arrested during a domestic violence incident, took a weapon from one of the two deputies escorting him, and the other deputy fired the fatal shot.
2014-09-05	Owens, Naim (22)		New York (New York)	Owens grazed officer John Hirschberger in the left thigh while fleeing cops, according to police. During the pursuit, cops shot Owens once in the upper back. He suffered complications during surgery and died from internal bleeding, the sources said.
2014-09-03	James Luke Bowman (43)	White	Nevada (Reno)	A multi-agency law enforcement team was conducting surveillance on a wanted subject who was possibly armed. During the operation, 42-year-old James Luke Bowman presented a weapon at the officers, and shots were fired.
2014-09-03	Karen Cifuentes (19)	Hispanic	Oklahoma (Oklahoma City)	Karen Cifuentes, 19, died after being shot about 6:15 p.m. near Melrose Lane and Rockwell Avenue, after allegedly trying to hit a sergeant with her car, according to police.
2014-09-03	Ronald David Henry Jr. (58)	Unknown race	Arizona (Tucson)	TPD says they received two 911 calls referencing a suicidal subject at the home. When officers arrived, they found the subject in the front yard armed with a handgun. Police say Henry then pointed the gun at officers. That's when police fired.
2014-09-02	Kendrick Brown (35)	Black	Ohio (Cleveland)	Officers were dispatched to respond for a male who was shooting at another male. A Cleveland Police sergeant was the first to arrive and encountered a suspect who pointed a handgun at the sergeant. The sergeant ordered the suspect to drop the weapon, which he did not. At this time, the sergeant fired three times, hitting the suspect.
2014-09-02	Richard Wray "Rick" Aceves (55)	White	Arizona (Phoenix)	Several residents reported hearing gunshots and when two officers arrived about 10:15 p.m., they said they heard a loud boom and approached a home where they believed it came from. As they approached the house, someone at a house across the street started firing. Two officers positioned on the top of a house across the street fired and struck the suspect several times.
2014-09-02	Mark Allen Kelley (45)	White	Oklahoma (Tulsa)	Clarence Kelley called police when his brother stabbed himself in the neck with an 8-inch knife just before 4 a.m. after being involved in an argument with his wife. Tulsa police officers instructed Kelley to drop the knife after becoming concerned he would approach nearby businesses or pedestrians in the area. He was shot multiple times when he approached officers while still carrying the knife. Kelley was transported to St. John Medical Center, where he was pronounced dead. Investigators have not determined whether Kelley died of gunshot wounds or the self-inflicted stab wounds.
2014-09-01	Jesse Castillo Jr. (45)	Hispanic	Oklahoma (Henryetta)	The Oklahoma Bureau of Investigation says a red Dodge pickup truck was traveling the wrong way on I-40 west of Henryetta, Oklahoma when Creek Nation Lighthorse and Henryetta police tried repeatedly to get the man to stop his truck. According to KJRH, officials say a Light Horse officer eventually fired his weapon, hitting the driver and sending the truck into a ditch.

== See also ==
- Death in custody § United States
- Henry A. Wallace Police Crime Public Database
- List of cases of police brutality
- List of countries with annual rates and counts for killings by law enforcement officers
- List of law enforcement officers killed in the line of duty in the United States
- List of law enforcement officers convicted for an on-duty killing in the United States
- List of shootings by US immigration agents
- List of police reforms related to the George Floyd protests
- List of unarmed African Americans killed by law enforcement officers in the United States
- Lists of killings by law enforcement officers
- Police brutality in the United States
- Police misconduct § United States
- Police riot § United States
- Police use of deadly force in the United States
