= The Quill (magazine) =

American literary magazine based at Bowdoin College

The Quill is an American college magazine, published by Bowdoin College in Brunswick, Maine. It is the college's oldest and only literary magazine. It is the second oldest continuously-functioning paper on the Bowdoin campus, second only to the Bowdoin Orient.

== History ==
The Quill was the successor to The Escritoir, which was published only during the 1826-27 school year. According to the founders of The Quill, "while there was no lack of verses in The Escritoir, there was a lack of poetry." So, a group of students headed by Percival Proctor Baxter set out to revive Bowdoin's literary life and, in January 1897 the first issue of The Quill was published. It was originally published on the fifteenth of each month. In 1929, it was published four times a year; in 1932, three times a year; and in 1956, two times each year. Since 1993 the Quill has been published once a year. Notably, several of Pulitzer Prize-winning poet Robert P.T. Coffin's poems were published in the magazine while he was a student in the early 1900s.

== Current activity ==
In recent years, though the final literary magazine is only published once a year, The Quill has remained active throughout the school year by putting out poetry pamphlets - folded brochures featuring about four poems each - roughly every month. Other activities hosted by the group include occasional coffeehouse events, the semi-annual creation of an "Insta-Pamphlet" by encouraging passersby in the Bowdoin Student Union to write a poem on the spot, and the "Day Long Poem," composed of single lines written by students in passing throughout a day. The Quill has also been known to print April Fool's editions of pamphlets, featuring joking statements such as "The Quill owns Baxter State Park," due to the club's connection with Percival Proctor Baxter (the club's first chairman), and containing poems that function as inside jokes written by club members. The Quill has recently seen a resurgence in activity on campus, and over the last four years the membership has doubled in size and the final magazine has been expanded by 20 pages.
