= Eugene V. Allen =

Eugene V. Allen (July 9, 1866-May 25, 1942) was an American Methodist minister and state legislator. He was twice elected to the Maine House of Representatives. In the 1920s, he was a prominent speaker on behalf of the Ku Klux Klan in Maine.

Allen was born in 1866 in Centerville, Washington County, Maine. He attended the East Maine Conference Seminary, a Methodist seminary in the 1890s. While there, he was classmates with DeForest H. Perkins, future Grand Dragon of the Maine Klan.

While a resident of Jonesboro, Allen was elected as Democrat to the 74th and 75th Legislatures (1909-1912). He was the only clergy member in the Maine Legislature while serving. As his second term came to a close in October 1912, Allen was appointed chaplain of the Maine State Prison by Governor Frederick W. Plaisted.
