= E. Delmont Merrill =

American politician (1904–1979)

Speaker of the Maine House of Representatives
- In office 1931–1933
- Preceded by: Robert Hale
- Succeeded by: Franz U. Burkett

Personal details
- Born: February 24, 1865 Dexter, Maine, U.S.
- Died: September 7, 1949 (aged 84) Dover-Foxcroft, Maine, U.S.
- Resting place: Rural Grove Cemetery; Dover-Foxcroft, Maine, U.S.
- Party: Progressive Party (1914); Republican (1926–1933)
- Spouses: Lora M. Dyer (m. 1888; died 1936); Marjory Waite (m. 1940)
- Children: Marion Dyer Merrill
- Education: Hahnemann Medical College
- Occupation: Physician

Elmer Delmont Merrill (February 24, 1865 – September 7, 1949) was an American physician and politician who was the Speaker of the Maine House of Representatives from 1931 to 1933.

== Early life ==
Merrill was born on February 24, 1865, in Dexter, Maine. He was the eldest son of Ithamar B. Merrill, a cobbler who served with the 22nd Maine Infantry Regiment during the American Civil War, and Mary A. (Toward) Merrill. Merrill was educated in the Dexter public schools and the Coburn Classical Institute. In 1886, he graduated from the Hahnemann Medical College, a homeopathic medical college. He began practicing medicine in Dover-Foxcroft, Maine that July. During World War I, he served on the Piscataquis County advisory medical board and was a member of the Medical Reserve Corps.

== Politics ==
Merrill was the Progressive Party's nominee for the United States House of Representatives seat in Maine's 4th congressional district in the 1914 election. He finished in third place behind Republican incumbent Frank E. Guernsey and Democrat Charles Mullen.

In 1926, Merrill was elected to the Maine House of Representatives as a Republican. In 1931, he defeated Franz U. Burkett 70 votes to 43 to win the Republican nomination for Speaker of the House. As the Republicans were in the majority, this was tantamount to election. He was not a candidate for reelection and was succeeded as Speaker by Burkett.

== Personal life ==
On November 27, 1888, Merill married Lora M. Dyer. They had one adopted daughter, Marion Dyer Merrill, who was the librarian of the Danbury State Normal School and the assistant librarian at Wheaton College. Lora Merrill died in 1936. On June 30, 1940, Merrill married Marjory Waite, daughter of United States Customs Court judge Byron Sylvester Waite, in Washington, D.C.

Merrill was a member of the Freemasons, Knights Templar, Royal Arch, Shriners, Knights of Pythias, Tarratine Club, and Congregational Church.

== Death ==
Merrill died on September 7, 1949, in Dover-Foxcroft, Maine.
