= 1920 Maine gubernatorial election =

- September 13, 1920
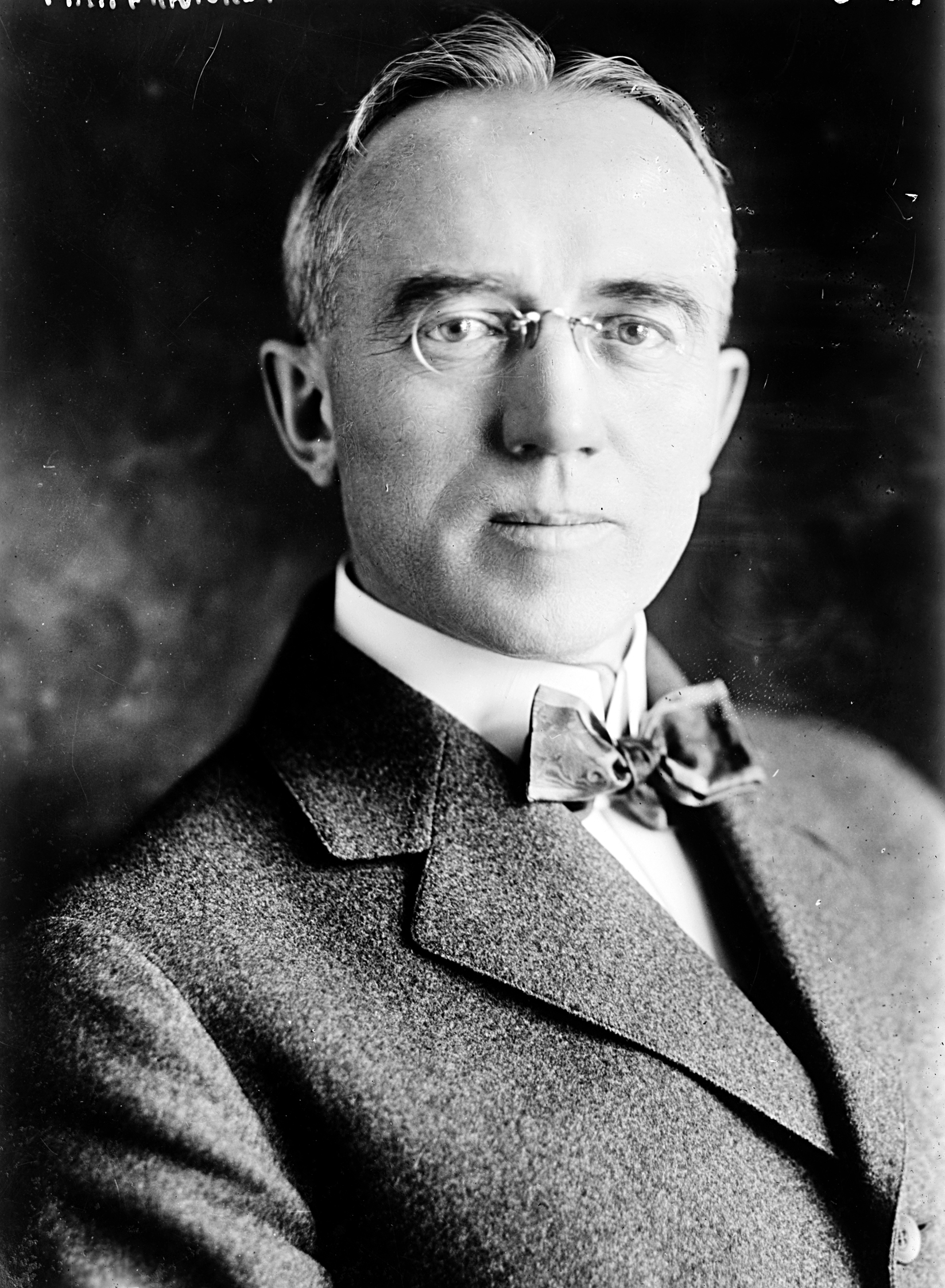

Nominee	Frederic Hale Parkhurst	Bertrand G. McIntire
Party	Republican	Democratic
Popular vote	135,393	70,047
Percentage	65.90%	34.10%
- County results Parkhurst: 50–60% 60–70% 70–80% 80–90%
Governor before election
Carl Milliken
Republican
Elected Governor
Frederic Hale Parkhurst
Republican

The 1920 Maine gubernatorial election took place on September 13, 1920.

Incumbent Governor Carl Milliken was defeated in the Republican primary.

Republican candidate Frederic Hale Parkhurst defeated Democratic candidate Bertrand G. McIntire.

== Results ==
1920 Maine gubernatorial election (Note: The Maine House Journal and Maine Senate Journal record the result as Parkhurst 135,410, McIntire 70,055, Scattering 27.)
Party	Candidate	Votes	%	±%
Republican	Frederic Hale Parkhurst	135,393	65.90%	
Democratic	Bertrand G. McIntire	70,047	34.10%	
Majority		65,346	31.80%	
Turnout		205,440	100.00%	
Republican hold		Swing		

Parkhurst died just 26 days in office following a months long illness, which started when he was Governor-elect.
