= Baxter State Park =

State park in Maine, United States

- IUCN category V (protected landscape/seascape)
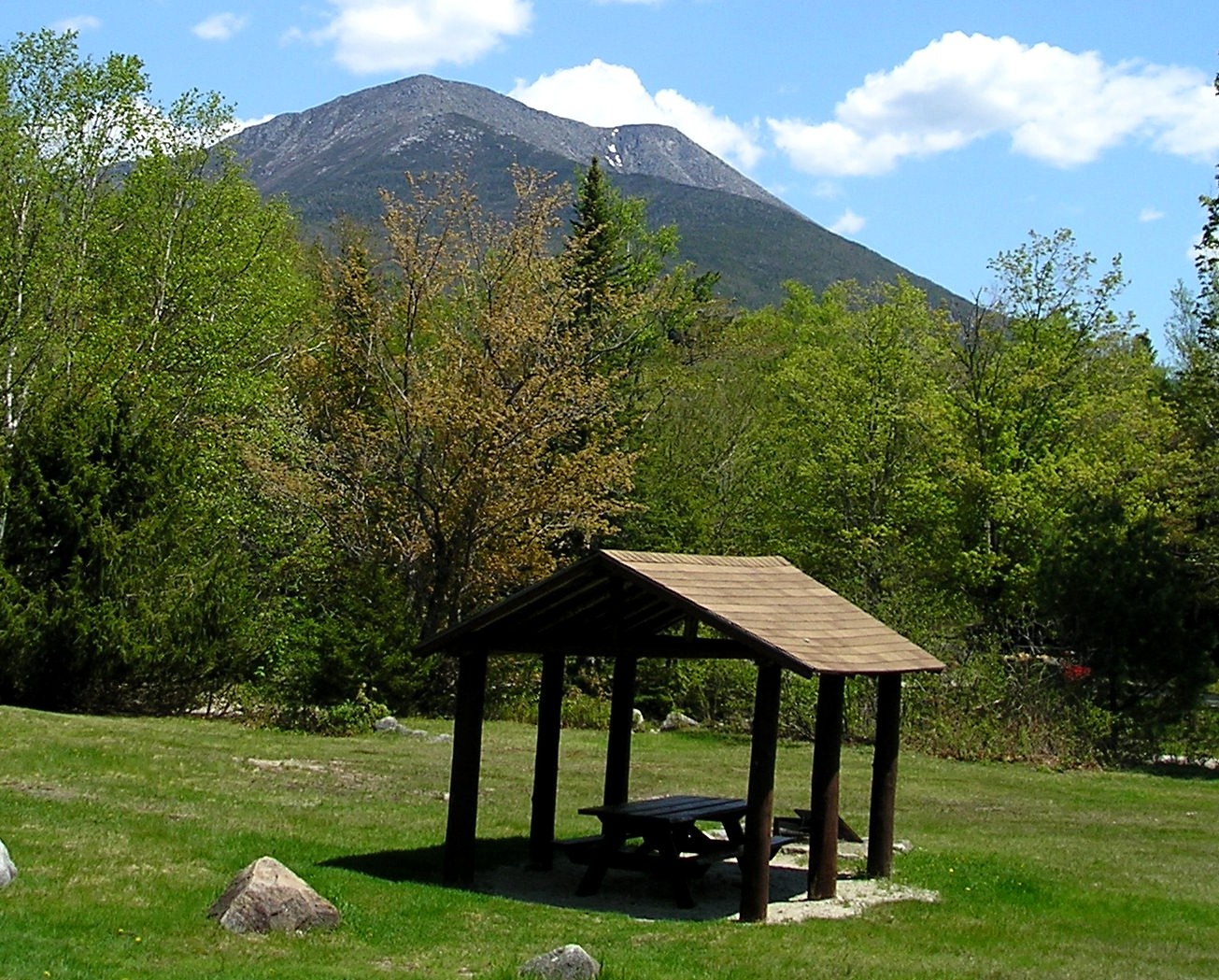
- Katahdin rises above Katahdin Stream Campground in Baxter State Park.

- Location within Maine
- Interactive map of Baxter State Park
- Location: Piscataquis County, Maine, United States
- Nearest city: Millinocket
- Coordinates: 46°2′N 68°56′W
- Area: 209,501 acres (847.82 km^{2})
- Established: March 3, 1931
- Visitors: 58,963 (in 2025)
- Governing body: Baxter State Park Authority
- Website: Official website

Baxter State Park is a large wilderness area permanently preserved as a state park in Northeast Piscataquis, Piscataquis County in north-central Maine, United States. It is in the North Maine Woods region and borders the Katahdin Woods and Waters National Monument on the east.

The park was established by 28 donations of land, in trust, from park donor Percival P. Baxter between the years of 1931 and 1962, eventually creating a park of over 200,000 acres (81,000 ha) in size. Baxter Park is not part of the Maine State Park system. Sole governance is provided by the Baxter State Park Authority, consisting of the Maine Attorney General, the Maine Commissioner of Inland Fisheries and Wildlife, and the Director of the Maine Forest Service. The park is independently funded through a combination of revenues from trusts, user fees, and the sale of forest products from the park's Scientific Forest Management Area. The park is home to the state's highest peak, Mount Katahdin.

== History ==
In 1920, eventual Governor Percival P. Baxter participated in an expedition to the top of Mount Katahdin, led by Burton Walter Howe (then-chairman of the Aroostook county Republican party), to determine its feasibility for the site of a national park.

The expedition included not only Baxter, the presumptive choice for President of the Senate, but also Charles P. Barnes, who was widely regarded as the leading candidate for Speaker of the House of Representatives of Maine when it convened in January 1921. The expedition's guide was Roy Dudley, the long-time game warden at Chimney Pond.

After assuming the Maine Senate presidency during the state's 80th legislative session, Percival Baxter appointed his brother Rupert, a Senator from Sagadahoc County, to the Committee on State Lands and Forest Preservation, which would be considering legislation that would create a state park at Katahdin. Baxter introduced on January 25, 1921 "AN ACT to Establish the Mt. Katahdin State Park" (80th Legislature, Senate No. 19). The unexpected death of Governor Frederick H. Parkhurst on January 31, 1921, triggered Senate President Baxter's elevation to the governorship. This unforeseen development dramatically changed the political fortunes of Baxter's park proposal. William F. Dawson's illustrated lecture, scheduled by Baxter for February 2, 1921, was canceled, and in its stead legislators were filing past Parkhurst's coffin laid out in the Capitol's rotunda. Baxter, the newly inaugurated governor, was no longer able to direct legislative deliberations on his bill.

With failed legislation, Baxter started to use his personal wealth to purchase land and pieced together the park by himself. His first action was a 6,000-acre (2,400 ha) purchase from the Great Northern Paper Company in 1930. He officially donated that parcel to the State of Maine in 1931 with a condition that the park be kept as wild in perpetuity. Baxter continued more purchases in his 32-year mission. He made the last purchase in 1962 and accumulated 201,018 acres (81,349 ha) of wilderness. Since Gov. Baxter's death in 1969, the park has been increased to a total of 209,501 acres (848 km^{2}), including the 2006 addition of a parcel of 4,678 acres (1,893 ha) and spectacular Katahdin Lake.

== Geography and climate ==
Katahdin consists of a cluster of mountains. The highest peak, Baxter Peak, is named after park donor and former Maine Governor Percival P. Baxter and rises up to 5,267 feet (1,605 m). The mountain is the northern terminus of the Appalachian Trail.

There are many bodies of water in the park. The three largest bodies of water are Grand Lake Matagamon, Webster Lake, and Nesowadnehunk Lake. There are also several smaller ponds, such as Hudson, Draper, Russell, Center and the South Branch ponds. Numerous streams and rivers connect these water bodies, most prominently Trout Brook (between Grand Lake Matagamon and Nesowadnehunk Lake) and Nesowadnehunk Stream (connecting Nesowadnehunk Lake and the small collection of ponds near Sentinel Mountain). Some of these have waterfalls; Nesowadnehunk Stream has Big and Little Niagara Falls, as well as Ledge Falls. Wassataquoik Stream has two waterfalls, Grand and Norway; another popular waterfall is Green Falls, tucked between Bald Mt. and South Pogy Mt. None of this water is potable, and the park advises that visitors bring or treat their water.

The climate of Baxter State Park lies within the Northern Forest Region of the American continent and experiences the cool, moist climate typical of this region. The annual mean temperature is 38.6 °F (3.7 °C); the record high temperature is 95 °F (35 °C), and the record low stands at −45 °F (−43 °C). The average annual precipitation is 37 inches (940 mm) which includes 100 inches (2,500 mm) per year of snow. Summer temperatures and conditions peak in the park in July and August; fall foliage colors begin to emerge in early September and peak in late September or early October. Leaf-fall in deciduous trees is complete by the end of October. Lasting snowfall usually begins in mid-to-late November, and lasts through April. Leaves emerge on deciduous trees around the last week of May. Weather in Baxter State Park can be characterized primarily by its variability; snowfall can occur any month of the year, and temperatures can and do fluctuate widely around the averages.

== Wildlife ==
Baxter State Park has a diverse population of wildlife, the most common of which are the moose, the black bear, and the white-tailed deer. These animals are most active during the summer months and can sometimes be seen from the road. The many marshes and bogs of the park serve as habitats for such animals as beaver, muskrats, river otters, and raccoons. Wooded areas of the park support other types of wildlife, including bobcats, fishers, martens, weasels, chipmunks, red squirrels, snowshoe hares, coyotes, lemmings, and red foxes. There is also an avian population in the park; the most common birds are warblers, thrushes, and flycatchers as well as owls, hawks, eagles, and ducks and other wetland birds.

== Features ==
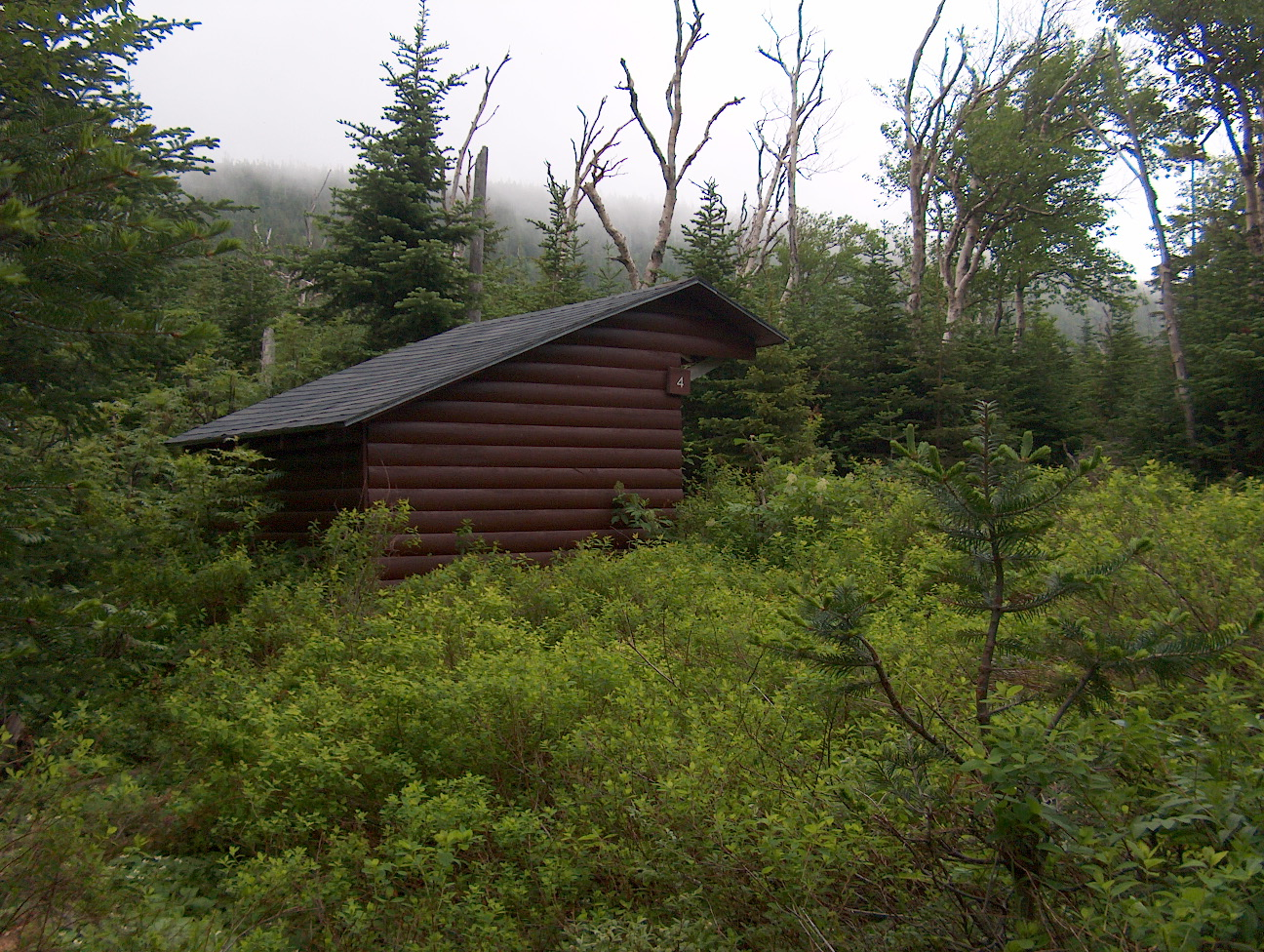
One of several lean-to shelters at Chimney Pond, reachable only by trail

Park Headquarters is located over twenty miles (32 km) from the actual park in the small town of Millinocket. There are no stores or gas stations inside the park. Access and use are strictly regulated in accordance with Gov. Baxter's expressed desire to keep the park "forever wild". Baxter wrote of the area: "Man is born to die, his work short lived; buildings crumble, monuments decay, wealth vanishes, but Katahdin, in all its glory, shall forever remain the mountain of the people of Maine. Throughout the ages it will stand as an inspiration to the men and women of the state."

Inside the park boundary, there is no electricity, running water, or paved roads. In keeping with the "Forever Wild" philosophy expressed by Gov. Baxter, the park prohibits the use of audio or visual devices in any way that impairs the enjoyment of the park by others or that may disturb or harass wildlife. Winter hiking and camping regulations have been recently revised to provide more freedom for park visitors, coupled with a clear understanding that park visitors must take responsibility for their safety in the often unforgiving winter environment of the park.

The park is open to overnight summer camping from May 15 to October 15 (Some campgrounds and backcountry sites open later, some campgrounds and the Birches stay open until October 22nd, conditions permitting.) and winter camping from December 1 to March 31. Only northbound long distance Appalachian Trail hikers can stay in the park without reservations; they are limited to one night's stay at The Birches camping area, which is limited to the first twelve hikers to sign in at an information kiosk several southbound trail miles away just inside the park's southern boundary.

In addition to hiking and camping, approximately 25% of the park is open to hunting and trapping (with the exception of moose hunting). Park ponds and streams are open to either fly fishing or general law fishing as determined by the Maine Department of Inland Fisheries and Wildlife and the Baxter State Park Authority. Snowmobiling is permitted on the Tote Road, the 46-mile (74 km) dirt road connecting the park's south gate at Togue Pond and the north gate at Matagamon. The park also includes a Scientific Forest Management Area of 29,587 acres (11,973 ha) located in its northwest corner. Park donor Percival Baxter directed that this area be managed for exemplary forest management. The area has been under active management for over 20 years and conducts sustainable, Forest Stewardship Council-certified management.

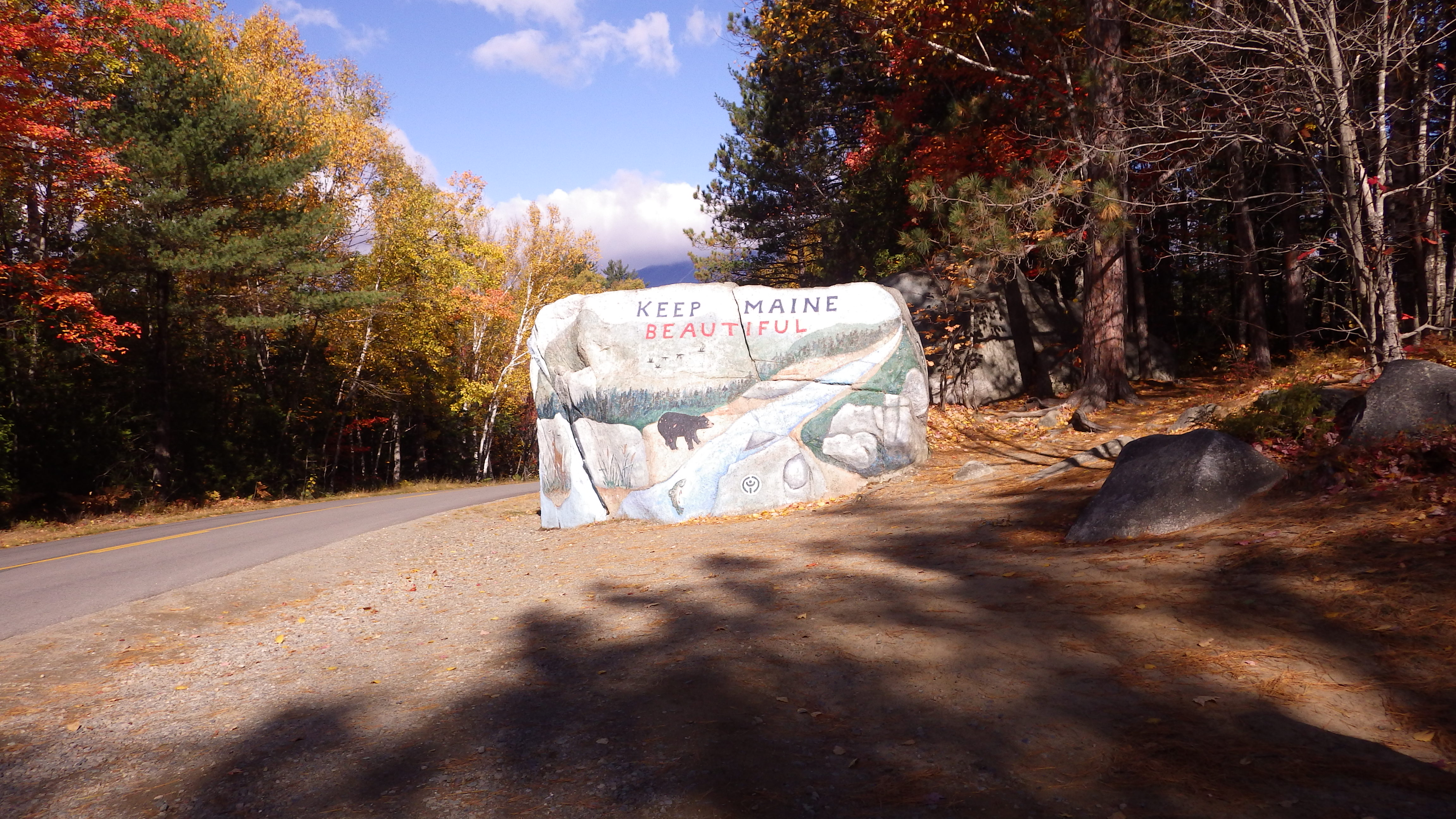
Pockwockamus Rock

In 1979, volunteers in the Maine Youth Conservation Corps created the mural on Pockwockamus Rock, located about 2.5 miles from the south gate (45.798977°N 68.894338°W).

Police protection within the park is provided by the park's Law Enforcement Ranger staff and local Maine IF&W Wardens. Fire protection is provided by the Maine Forest Service; waste disposal and recycling is addressed through the park's Carry-In, Carry-Out policy. Maintenance is done by the many volunteer workers and paid employees of the park.

== Sources ==
- Avery, Myron; Taylor, Helon; Stephenson, Jean. Katahdin Section Guide to the Appalachian Trail in Maine (7th ed.).
- Soares, Liz (1996). All for Maine: The Story of Governor Percival P. Baxter. Windswept House Publishers. ISBN 1-883650-17-8.
- Kellogg, Edward S. (1983). "Legacy of a Lifetime: The Story of Baxter State Park. By John W. Hakola. (Woolwich, Maine: TBW Books for the Baxter State Park Authority, 1981. xviii + 424 pp. Illustrations, tables, maps, appendixes, notes, index. $16)". Forest & Conservation History. 27 (2): 100. doi:10.2307/4004993. ISSN 1046-7009. JSTOR 4004993.
