= East Maine Conference Seminary =

Coordinates: 44.5753°N 68.7981°W

The East Maine Conference Seminary was a Methodist seminary and preparatory school in Bucksport, Maine. Located on Wilson Street in Bucksport, it educated students from 1848 to 1933. A building built and used by EMCS, Wilson Hall, is on the National Register of Historic Places.

== Notable alumni ==
- Edville Gerhardt Abbott, American orthopedic surgeon and orthotist (Class of 1889)
- Eugene V. Allen, Maine state legislator, Maine State Prison chaplain, and orator on behalf of the Maine Ku Klux Klan
- Jeremiah E. Burke, Superintendent of schools in Boston and Lawrence, Massachusetts (class of 1886)
- Clarence M. Condon, United States Army Sergeant who received the Medal of Honor for actions during the Philippine–American War
- Frank Fellows, U.S. Representative from Maine serving from 1941 to 1951
- Frank E. Guernsey, U.S. Representative from Maine
- DeForest H. Perkins, Public School Superintendent and Grand Dragon of the Maine Ku Klux Klan
