= Clarence M. Condon =

US Army officer and Medal of Honor recipient (1875–1916)

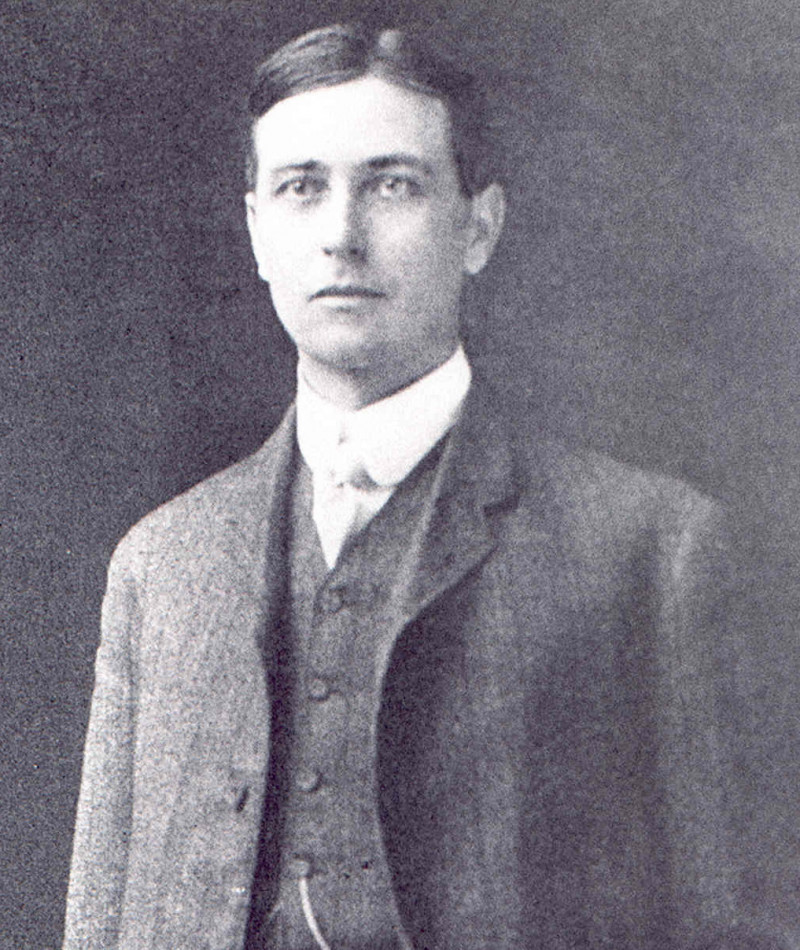
- Born: August 12, 1875; South Brooksville, Maine, US
- Died: July 20, 1916 (aged 40); Walter Reed General Hospital, Washington, D.C., US
- Burial place: Arlington National Cemetery
- Military career
- Allegiance: United States
- Branch: United States Army
- Service years: 1894–1916
- Rank: Lieutenant colonel
- Unit: 3rd Artillery Regiment
- Conflicts: Philippine American War
- Awards: Medal of Honor

Clarence Melville Condon (August 12, 1875 – July 20, 1916) was a United States Army Sergeant who received the Medal of Honor for actions during the Philippine–American War.

== Biography ==
Clarence Condon was born August 12, 1875, in South Brooksville, Maine to Melville and Clara Redman Condon. He was educated in the public schools of Bucksport, Maine and attended the East Maine Conference Seminary and State Normal School at Castine.

== Military career ==
Clarence Condon joined service as a private in Battery E, 3rd Artillery in December, 1894.

He was a corporal from December 8, 1894, to December 7, 1897, and sergeant from December 17, 1897, to July, 1900 while with Company G, 3rd United States Artillery. During the Philippine–American War, he served as chief of scouts for General MacArthur and was five times commended for bravery in the face of the enemy. On June 15, 1900, he was commissioned a second lieutenant with the Philippine Cavalry.

After mustering out of the Philippine Cavalry, he was commissioned a second lieutenant with the Artillery Corps on February 2, 1901. He continued to serve in a variety of billets, obtaining the rank of lieutenant colonel. One of his tours of duty included teaching at Ohio Wesleyan University.

Condon was promoted to first lieutenant on June 17, 1904 and captain on September 21, 1908.

Condon graduated from the Army Artillery School in 1904, and the Army Staff College in 1916.

At the time of his death, he was one of few officers from the Coast Artillery Corps who had graduated from the ranks and obtained a commission through bravery in battle.

== Personal life ==
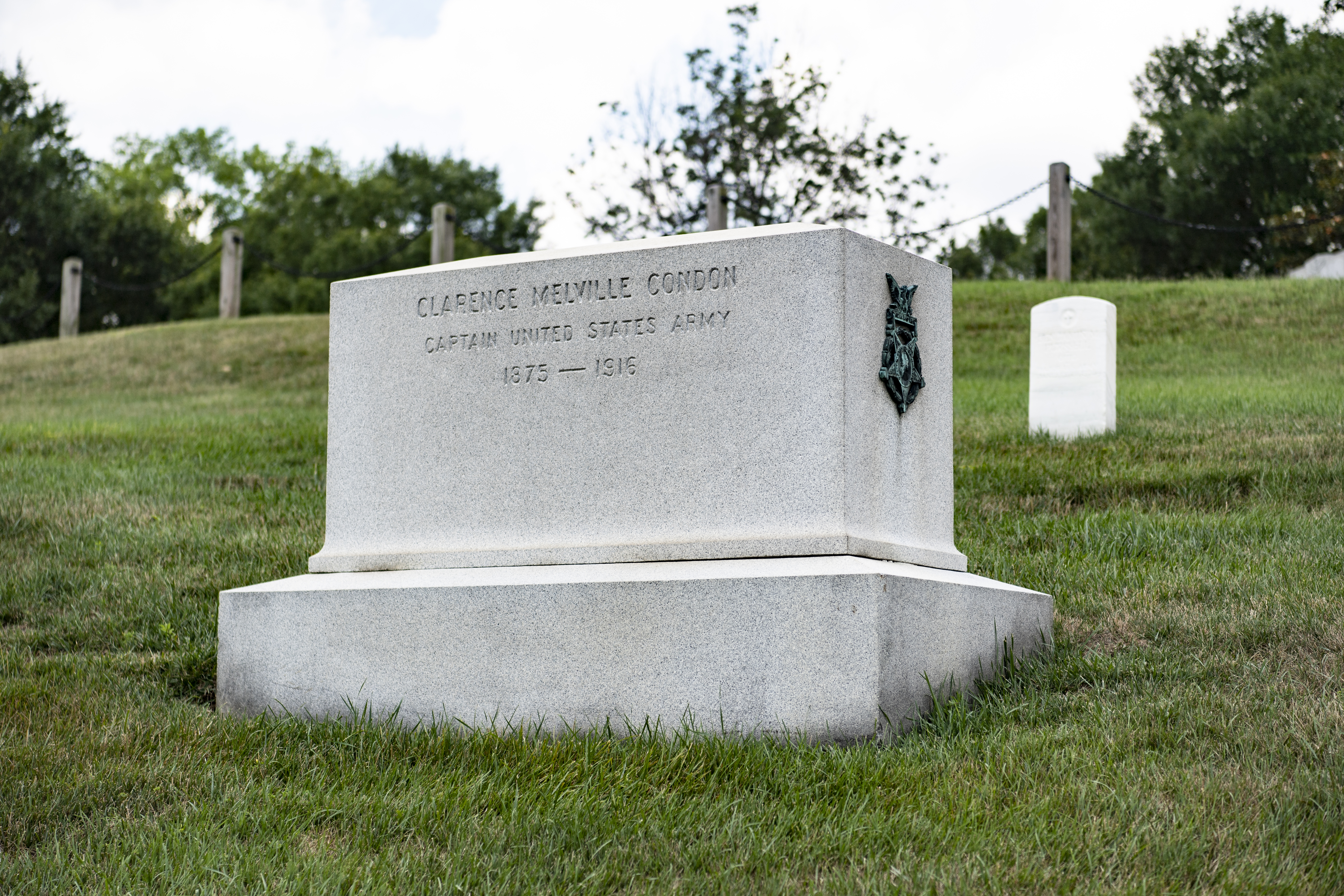
Grave at Arlington National Cemetery

In May 1902, he obtained a Bachelor of Laws degree from the National University School of Law. He continued to study at National University and, in June the following year, obtained a Master of Laws degree.

In April 1903, he married Fanchon "Fanny" O'Connell, the daughter of the Solicitor of the Treasury Maurice D. O'Connell, and had three sons Maurice Melville, Reynolds and Clarence Melville Condon.

Colonel Condon died at Walter Reed Army Medical Center on July 20, 1916, after a brief illness, and was buried at Arlington National Cemetery.

== Honors ==
Clarence Condon was awarded both the Medal of Honor and the Army Certificate of Merit for bravery in fighting the Moros on the island of Jolo. He was the only man in the US Army to have earned both the Medal of Honor and the Certificate of Merit for gallantry in action.

Condon Road in Fort Sill, Oklahoma is named for him.

In 1921, the Junior Mine Planter Captain Clarence M. Condon was completed by Dafoe Shipbuilding Company in Bay City, Michigan.

== Medal of Honor citation ==
Rank and organization: Sergeant, Battery G, 3d U.S. Artillery. Place and date: Near Calulut, Luzon, Philippine Islands, November 5, 1899. Entered service at: ------. Birth: South Brooksville, Maine. Date of issue: March 11, 1902.

Citation:

While in command of a detachment of 4 men, charged and routed 40 entrenched insurgents, inflicting on them heavy loss.

== See also ==
- List of Medal of Honor recipients
- List of Philippine–American War Medal of Honor recipients
