= Ku Klux Klan in Maine =

Although the Ku Klux Klan is most often associated with white supremacy, the revived Klan of the 1920s was also anti-Catholic. In U.S. states such as Maine, which had a very small black population but a burgeoning number of Acadian, French-Canadian and Irish immigrants, the Klan manifested primarily as a Protestant nativist movement directed against the Catholic minority as well as African-Americans. For a period in the mid-1920s, the Klan captured elements of the Maine Republican Party, even helping to elect a governor, Ralph Owen Brewster.

The Klan tapped into a long history of fraught relations between Maine's established Protestant "Yankee" population (those descended from the original English colonials) and Irish-Catholic newcomers, who had begun immigrating in large numbers in the 1830s. The rise of the Know-Nothing Party in the 1850s had led to the burning of a Catholic church in Bath, Maine, and the tarring and feathering of a Catholic priest, Father John Bapst, in Ellsworth, where complaints from Catholics about Protestant-oriented public schools had helped to motivate the mob that attacked Bapst. The main front in the war on immigrants before the American Civil War, however, was temperance legislation. The Maine law of 1851 was the first statewide prohibition ordinance in the country, and was perceived by Maine's Irish-Catholic population as an attack on their culture. With the growing influence of Democratic Irish-Catholic and French-Canadian municipal politicians in cities like Bangor, Lewiston, and Portland, ethnicity and religion increasingly helped to draw party lines. Prominent Klan leaders and/or speakers included F. Eugene Farnsworth, DeForest H. Perkins, and Benjamin Bubar Sr.

== Blaine Republicanism and Catholics ==
James G. Blaine, a leader of the Maine and national Republican parties following the Civil War, and the party's candidate for U.S. president in 1884, helped deepen the rift between his party and Irish-American voters by sponsoring, while still Speaker of the House of Representatives, a proposed amendment to the United States Constitution which would have outlawed the use of tax money to pay for parochial schools. While defeated in the Senate, "Blaine Amendments" were inserted into the constitutions of all but eleven states, one of which was, ironically, Maine. The absence of a Maine Blaine Amendment would be exploited by the Klan in the 1920s, as they made the spectre of state support for Catholic schools one of their wedge issues. Blaine's 1884 presidential run is generally credited with having been defeated, in part, by Irish Catholic voters angered when a prominent Blaine supporter referred to the Democratic Party as "the party of rum, Romanism, and rebellion". Ironically, Blaine's mother was Catholic and his sister was a nun.

== Maine and the Klan revival of the 1920s ==
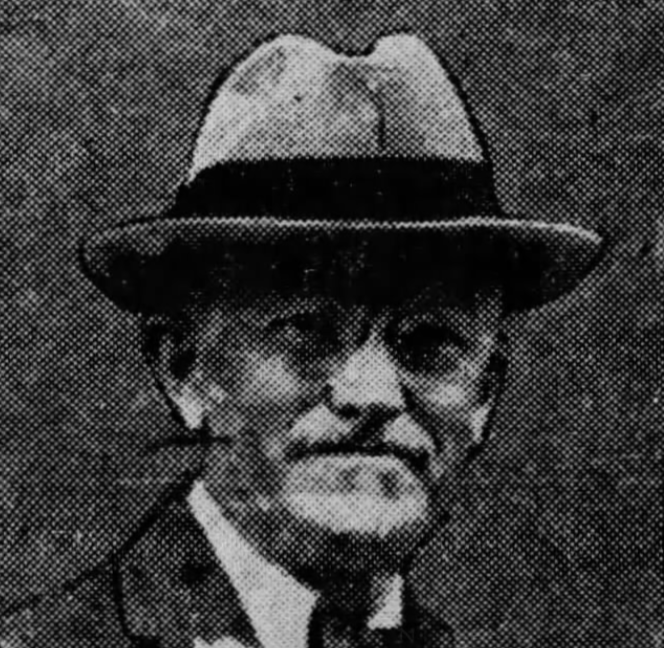
F. Eugene Farnsworth was the first recruiter for the Ku Klux Klan in Maine.

The sudden growth of the Klan in the 1920s in Maine followed national trends, but was particularly strong in comparison to Klan activity elsewhere in the Northeast. Partly it revived much older Protestant/Irish-Catholic divisions, but it was mainly fueled by a newer wave of Catholic French-Canadian immigrants who worked mainly in Maine's textile mill cities, such as Lewiston, Saco, Biddeford, Brunswick, etc., and Italian, Polish, Lithuanians, and other mostly Catholic immigrants who went to work in paper mills in northern Maine cities like Millinocket and Rumford. Irish Catholics had also made gains in municipal politics, along with a small urban Jewish community, while rural areas had declined at the expense of a few cities such as Portland, Bangor, and Lewiston. Maine's small African-American communities in Portland and Bangor had formed NAACP chapters in 1920, and the one in Bangor had protested against the third local showing of the Klan-themed film The Birth of a Nation, successfully negotiating with a local theatre-owner to edit out the most provocative scene.

Klanishness was on the mind of the people of Ellsworth, Maine as early as 1919 when 30 residents staged a surprise party for a friend. The party was all dressed in Klan regalia when they surprised their friends, Mr. and Mrs. G. N. Worden. They unrobed for the party, but dressed back up in their white hoods to walk home, according to the Ellsworth American. In 1921, a member of the Boston University baseball team for injured WWI Veterans, Harry E Stumcke, was targeted in a nonviolent property crime during his summer camp stay in Ellsworth. The article reads "Six men, signing themselves 'the silent six,' and working along the plans of the Ku Klux Klan, visited the Macomber Estate on Franklin Street on Sunday evening. The party worked quietly and upset completely the room occupied by Harry E. Stumcke, a star of the B.U. nine. None of Mr. Stumcke's property was taken." It is unclear why Mr. Stumcke was targeted as he does not seem to have been Catholic, Jewish, an immigrant, or Black.

The King Kleagle (chief recruiter) of the Maine Klan was the charismatic F. Eugene Farnsworth, a former barber, stage magician (or hypnotist, accounts differ), and failed motion picture studio owner. Farnsworth was born in the eastern Maine town of Columbia Falls, but traveled widely outside the state, and likely returned to Maine as an employee of the national Klan organization. Beginning in 1922–23 Farnsworth began a statewide speaking tour that drew huge crowds—from 1,000 to even 5,000 at a time—many of whom were afterward inducted into the secret society after paying a $10 membership fee. Farnsworth would usually share the stage with a Protestant minister, and they would rail against what they perceived as growing Catholic political power in Maine. Besides existential targets like the Pope, the Jesuits, and the Knights of Columbus, they specifically attacked the growth of Maine's Catholic school system, as well as the presence of Catholics (and Jews) on public school boards. They credited this last development with "taking the Bible out of schools", as the Catholic population increasingly objected to the reading of the King James Bible in state-supported classrooms.

== The Klan and the Portland referendum of 1923 ==
The Maine Klan scored its first political victory in 1923 when it threw its support behind a Portland referendum to abolish the mayor-and-alderman form of municipal government, which allowed Irish-Catholic and Jewish neighborhoods some influence in city politics, and substituted it with a city-manager-and-councilors form of government. In the old form, the government consisted of an elected mayor, an 18 member common council, and a 9 member board of aldermen; the new form of government reduced this to a five member city council and a city manager of their choosing, thus greatly diminishing the power of minorities.

The Portland branch of the NAACP tried to create a united front among Irish, Jewish, African-Americans, and labor unions in opposition to the change, but it was unsuccessful. Although in 1921, when the plan had first been proposed (and before the Klan had formed), the measure had lost by only 200 votes, the overwhelming margin of victory after the Klan became involved (it won by over 4,000 votes) convinced local and national politicians alike that the Maine Klan was a force to be reckoned with. Maine may also have been targeted by the national Klan organization precisely because it was considered a bellwether state in national elections ("as Maine goes, so goes the nation" was the phrase at the time). Even before the victory in Portland, Farnsworth had declared that the Klan would elect the next governor of Maine.

== The Klan on parade, and cross burnings ==
Although a secret society, the Klan maintained a very public image in Maine from the time recruitment started in earnest in 1923. Farnsworth's speeches were made in large open halls and sometimes reprinted in full in local papers. In September, 1923, the Mayor of Portland refused a Klan request for a public parade on Columbus Day, but daylight parades by hooded Klansman did take place in Portland, Sanford, Gardiner, Brewer, Milo, Dexter, East Hodgdon, and Kittery. 400 participated, ending their parade at the Portsmouth Naval Shipyard and Brownville Junction among other places. In the Piscataquis County town of Milo, Farnsworth claimed "everybody" belonged to the Klan: 600 citizens, town officials, and the sheriff. The Klan parade in Milo in 1923 was the first in New England, and the first in the U.S. to take place in broad daylight. The first State Convention of the Klan was held in the forest outside Waterville later in 1923, and attracted 15,000. Burning crosses were in abundance.

That same year the Klan purchased a large estate in Portland (the Rollins Estate on Forest Avenue) for its headquarters, and 3,000 Klansmen from around the state gathered for the opening ceremony in February, 1924, initiating 200 new members under a burning cross. The Portland 'klavern' (chapter) was named after Dr. W. H. Witham, the Grand Klud (religious leader) of the Realm of Maine. The Klan also claimed to have opened a 'tabernacle' in Bangor.

In December 1924, the local newspaper in Ellsworth, Maine republished a Letter to the Editor from the New York World regarding Klan activity in Hancock County, Maine. The writer claimed to have gone with "intensely patriotic" friends to Ellsworth's 1924 Hancock County Fair "in the rock-ribbed Yankee state of Maine". He expressed shared disbelief of his own and that of his companions at the Klan presence at the fair saying that it was "a community with an unusually large Ku Klux Klan following". The writer admonished the Klan's behavior, saying that during the National Anthem before a speech from Gov. Baxter "hundreds stood with covered heads, not allowing the anthem to interest their discourses on horses, etc." which is indeed incongruous with Klan dogma, lending likelihood that it was intended to be in protest to Baxter. The visitor summarizes his impression of the event by saying he had "never seen such flagrant disrespect to our flag." Additional cross-burnings, parades, rallies, and celebrations in Trenton, Southwest Harbor, Northeast Harbor, and Bar Harbor are known to have occurred in Hancock County with a large Klan "encampment" at modern-day (as of 2025) Narrows Too Campground (formerly Barcadia Campground) on Maine State Route 3 in Trenton between the airfield and the causeway to Mount Desert Island.

In some cities and towns, groups of Catholics, particularly the Irish and French-Canadians, opposed Klan marches with force. In 1924, French-Canadians turned back a Klan march in Greenville, fought the Klan with rocks and clubs in Fairfield (before tearing down a burning cross), and defended a bridge in Biddeford.

== Klan ministers ==
Klan ministers were most often Methodists, and sometimes Baptists, while the Congregational and Unitarian churches openly opposed the organization. Many of Maine's Protestant ministers spoke at Klan rallies and at least one, Methodist pastor Arthur F. Leigh of Randolph, Maine, publicly declared himself a Klansman. While testifying at a public hearing of the Maine Senate in 1925 on the Barwise Bill, a measure which the Klan supported, Leigh shouted "I am a Klansman, get it!?" at which the public gallery, also packed with Klansmen, erupted.

Previously, in 1924, the Klan Klam Bake in Trenton, Maine had a crowd of 5000 receive a lecture by a former Methodist Church pastor from Ellsworth, Maine, Rev. John Blake. Earlier that same year, the Baptist Church in Ellsworth had offered a "pleasing" evening sermon, "The Ku Klux Klan of God" by Rev. Walter Lyons.

In 1926 the Rev. Milton Charles Bennett of Bangor sued Klansmen F. Herbert Hathorn of Brewer and D.D. Terrill of Bangor because he was discharged as pastor of the "Klan Church" of Bangor and Brewer. Bennett was awarded compensation.

Other ministers associated with the Maine Klan included the Rev. George S. Robinson of Trinity Episcopal Church in Lewiston, Maine, the Rev. Nathaniel French of Auburn, Maine, the Rev. Eugene V. Allen, who was described as "The Grand Klaliff (Vice Dragon) of Maine", and the Rev. Judson P. Marvin of Portland. (Marvin's obituary in the Portsmouth (NH) Herald, March 20, 1933, p. 7, states that he "held one of the high offices within that organization" (i.e. the Klan). Marvin was from Portsmouth, and the son of a former mayor.)

== The Klan and the Maine Republican Party ==
The arrival of the Klan on the local political scene split the Maine Republican Party. An old-guard element loyal to Gov. Percival Baxter and U.S. Senator Frederick Hale staunchly opposed the Klan. As early as 1922, Baxter had called it "an insult and an affront to American citizens" and said "I believe Maine people prefer the light of day to deeds of darkness". The Klan found champions, however, in state senators Mark Alton Barwise and Owen Brewster, who sponsored legislation seeking to outlaw state aid to parochial schools. Brewster refused to denounce Klan support in his own run for the governorship in 1924. The Democrats picked, as their candidate to oppose Brewster, William Robinson Pattangall, a descendant of Mayflower Yankees, who had attempted (unsuccessfully) to insert an anti-Klan plank into the platform of the Democratic National Convention that same year. Pattangall campaigned almost entirely on anti-Klan sentiment, while Brewster said nothing about the society. Brewster won by a large margin, seeming to fulfill Kleagle Farnsworth's promise that the Klan would select the next governor. In response, a large celebration called the "Klan Klam Bake" was held at a farm in Trenton, Maine, where some sources claim upwards of 5000 people attended. In addition to the clambake, crosses were burned and Klan initiations (called "naturalizations") also took place.

The following year the Maine Klan elevated DeForest H. Perkins, the former Portland School Superintendent, as the state's own Grand Dragon. King Kleagle Farnsworth, who by this time had broken with the Klan over its refusal to accept Canadian immigrants (who were prominent in the Maine ranks), died suddenly of an illness in 1926. He was replaced as King Kleagle of Maine, New Hampshire, and Vermont by Dr. Edward W. Gayer, an Indiana-born physician and graduate of Purdue University.

On the county, municipal, and town levels, Klansmen captured several offices and influenced many other elections. Avowed Klansmen became mayors of Saco (John G. Smith), Westbrook (Charles S. Tuttle Jr) and Rockland. The Klan "figured prominently" in the election of mayor Allen M. Irish of Bath. In 1923, the Klan were beginning "to take an active part in the politics" of Brewer, and the following year Kleagle Farnsworth declared that "all Klan candidates" on the ballot had won in the town of Dexter, Maine (Gov. Brewster's home town). In 1928 the New York Times referred to Newport and Kennebunkport as "old Ku Klux capitals" Other political figures whose elections were reportedly endorsed by the Klan included Androscoggin County sheriff E.E. Additon, Auburn mayor Fred E. Walton, Lisbon Falls state representative Louis A. Jack, and president of the Maine State Senate Hodgdon Buzzell.

== The 1926 special senatorial election ==
A 1926 special election for U.S. Senator from Maine following the death of Sen. Bert M. Fernald saw the Klan issue played out again. This time the Republican candidate, Arthur R. Gould, ran on an explicitly anti-Klan platform, winning with the help of large numbers of Democrats who crossed over to send a message to the Klan faction of Republicans. Governor Brewster took the unprecedented step of denouncing the Klan-endorsed senatorial candidate of his own party, Ellsworth native and political turncoat Fulton Redman, which only helped Gould's cause.

For the first time in a Maine senatorial election, Gould won every county and city in the state. The Chairman of the Republican State Committee declared that with Gould's victory, "the sinister influence of an oath-bound organization no longer threatens the welfare of Maine".

Other Maine Republicans who took uncompromising stances against Klan influence in their party during the 1920s included state representatives Clyde Smith (husband of future Senator Margaret Chase Smith); Robert Hale (cousin of U.S. Sen. Frederick Hale and a future U.S. Congressman); and former Penobscot County sheriff Maj. Arthur L. Thayer, who mounted a primary challenge against Brewster in 1926.

== Decline of the Maine Klan ==
Even before the Gould election revealed the limits of Klan influence, the organization began to weaken in other ways. In May 1926, Mayor Ernest L. McLean of Augusta (a Democrat) caused the cancellation of a large Klan rally and parade in the state capital by prohibiting marchers from wearing hoods or otherwise covering their faces. The national Klan itself would prohibit the wearing of face-covering hoods by its members in 1928, a measure which accelerated the decline in membership. Also in February 1926 the sprawling headquarters of the Maine Klan in Portland was seized by the city for unpaid taxes, with the organization's affairs being described by one newspaper as "muddled". By 1928 the New York Times reported that Klan strength in Portland had fallen from 900 to 200–300. This mirrored the decline of the Klan nationally.

An area Farnsworth tried but ultimately failed to develop was the recruitment of women. His desire was for a branch of the Klan to stem the growth of Catholics in public education and strengthen moralistic teachings in the home. For him women were the answer. Mrs. Gertrude Witham was promoted to Major Kleagle of the Maine Women of the KKK. However Farnsworth and Witham failed in effectively recruiting new women members. It also became apparent as time passed that some of the female Klan members were foreign-born (i.e. Canadian). This resulted in the dismissal of these women and their suing of the Klan to recover their initiation fees and dues. On top of this Farnsworth continued to charge $10 as an initiation fee, instead of the agreed-upon fee by the national women's organization of $5. These efforts outside of the guidelines of the national Klan, along with other perceived misconduct, would eventually lead to Farnsworth's resignation as King Kleagle of Maine.

A 1928 Republican senatorial primary fight was the last time the Klan campaigned openly for a candidate, in this case for Owen Brewster against incumbent Frederick Hale. Ex-governor Baxter, also a Republican, openly accused Brewster of Klan membership, claiming he had joined the organization and sworn an oath in front of the Imperial Wizard in Washington, D.C. Baxter further testified that Brewster had offered him 25,000 Klan votes, which "he absolutely controlled" if he (Baxter) would enter the gubernatorial campaign that same year. Baxter made these and other charges in a long newspaper interview, in which he also accused Brewster of "political treachery and double-dealing" and being "unworthy of the confidence of the Republican Party".

In the Republican primary for governor that same year, the mayor of Saco, Maine, avowed Klansman John C. Smith, lost to old-guard Republican William Tudor Gardiner. The victories of Hale and Gardiner, this time without the help of Democrats, proved that the Maine Klan was a spent political force, and led to the resignation of Grand Dragon Perkins.

Brewster was eventually elected to the House of Representatives, and then the Senate, where he became a close ally of Wisconsin's Joseph McCarthy, a Roman Catholic (they were united largely by anti-communism).

In 1928 the Catholic Diocese of Maine struck a triumphalist note by naming its newly opened high school in Bangor after father John Bapst, the priest who had been tarred and feathered in Ellsworth during a previous period of anti-Catholicism.

Klan Klaverns (local chapters) lingered on in some Maine towns years after the national and state organizations had dissolved, partly kept alive by their women's auxiliaries. In Kittery, the "ladies of the Klan" held a baked bean and salad supper at the local Grange Hall in 1931, and Kittery's Klavern (no. 5) sponsored a booth at a Depression-era "Unemployment Bazaar" in 1933, alongside the Lion's Club, garden clubs, and even the local Catholic Church. At this last event, the names of all six booth-tenders were published in the newspaper, suggesting that the "Invisible Empire" was trying to adapt to the role of local fraternal organization. By the mid-1930s, however, references to the KKK in the Maine press had all but disappeared.

== 1987 Rumford rally ==
As part of a recruitment campaign, on September 26, 1987, about two dozen Klan members burned a cross on a farm about 15 miles from Rumford, Maine. A Klan spokesman, James W. Farrands, said that Rumford was chosen just for its central location. Anti-Klan rallies were held in Portland, Bangor, Augusta, Lewiston, and Kennebunkport, and there were 150–200 anti-Klan demonstrators in Rumford, including representatives of the governor and Maine's two senators. To show their displeasure, neighbors surrounded the farm with chicken manure.
