= Frederic Hale Parkhurst =

American politician (1864–1921)

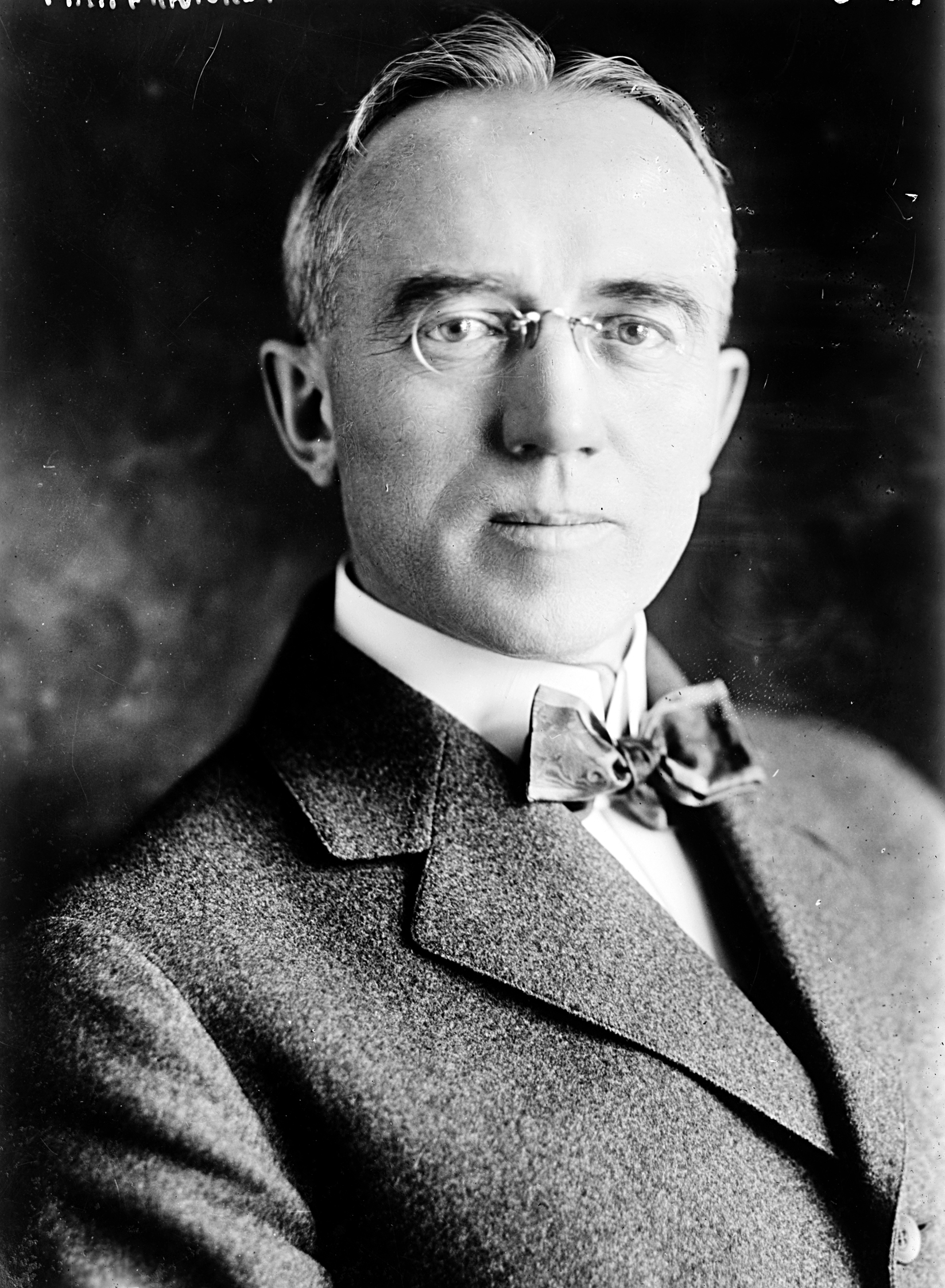
- Parkhurst, c. 1915–1920

52nd Governor of Maine
- In office January 5, 1921 – January 31, 1921
- Preceded by: Carl E. Milliken
- Succeeded by: Percival Baxter

Member of the Maine Senate
- In office 1907–1908

Member of the Maine House of Representatives
- In office 1895–1896; 1899–1902

Personal details
- Born: November 5, 1864 Bangor, Maine, U.S.
- Died: January 31, 1921 (aged 56) Augusta, Maine, U.S.
- Party: Republican
- Spouse(s): Marie Jennings Reid; Dorothy Woodman
- Education: George Washington University Law School
- Profession: Attorney; Businessman

Frederic Hale Parkhurst (November 5, 1864 – January 31, 1921) was an American politician. He was the 52nd governor of Maine, serving for less than a month before his death.

== Biography ==
Parkhurst was born in Bangor, Maine, the son of trunk manufacturer J.F. Parkhurst. He graduated from Washington, D.C.'s Columbian Law School (now George Washington University Law School) in 1887 and became an attorney in Bangor. Never practiced law and instead went into business. He became partner with his father in a successful leather manufacturing and retail business.

A Republican, he served on the Bangor City Council from 1893 to 1894 and was the council's president in 1894. He was a member of the Maine House of Representatives from 1895 to 1896 and 1899 to 1902. He was a Delegate to the 1900 Republican National Convention. Parkhurst was also a member of the Maine Militia, serving as Commissary General with the rank of colonel from 1901 to 1904.

From 1907 to 1908 Parkhurst was a member of the Maine State Senate, and he was chairman of the Maine Republican Party from 1914 to 1916. In 1920, he defeated incumbent Carl Milliken in Maine's Republican primary for governor. After winning the general election in September, Parkhurst became ill during the period between winning the election and his inauguration. Parkhurst managed to leave his sickbed to take the oath of office, but died of pneumonia just three weeks later. His body lied in the state rotunda on February 2 and his funeral was held at Augusta's South Parish Congregational Church and Parish House. He was buried at Mount Hope Cemetery in Bangor.

His 26 days as Governor make his term one of the shortest in Maine history; the record belongs to Nathaniel Haskell, who served for 25 hours in 1953. Senate President Percival Proctor Baxter, also a Republican, finished Parkhurst's term in office.

Party political offices
| Preceded by Carl Milliken | Republican nominee for Governor of Maine; 1920 | Succeeded by Percival P. Baxter |
Political offices
| Preceded by Carl E. Milliken | Governor of Maine; 1921 | Succeeded by Percival P. Baxter |
