= Frank E. Guernsey =

American politician (1886–1927)

Frank Edward Guernsey
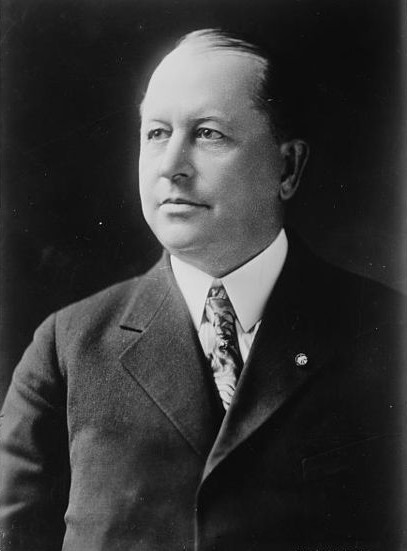

Member of the U.S. House of Representatives from Maine's 4th district
- In office November 3, 1908 – March 3, 1917
- Preceded by: Llewellyn Powers
- Succeeded by: Ira G. Hersey

Member of the Maine Senate
- In office 1903–1903

Member of the Maine House of Representatives
- In office 1897–1899

Treasurer of Piscataquis County, Maine
- In office 1890 – December 31, 1896

Personal details
- Born: October 15, 1866 Dover, Maine
- Died: January 1, 1927 (aged 60) Boston, Massachusetts
- Resting place: Dover Cemetery, Dover-Foxcroft, Maine
- Party: Republican
- Spouse(s): Josephine Frances Lyford, m. June 16, 1887
- Children: Thompson L. Guernsey, born, February 17, 1904.
- Education: Eastman's College, Poughkeepsie, New York

Frank Edward Guernsey (October 15, 1866 – January 1, 1927) was a U.S. representative from Maine.

== Early life ==
Guernsey, the son of Edward Hersey Guernsey and Hannah (Thompson) Guernsey, was born in Dover, Maine on October 15, 1866.

== Education ==
Guernsey attended the common schools, Foxcroft Academy, East Maine Conference Seminary, Bucksport, Maine, Wesleyan Seminary, Kents Hill, Maine, and Eastman's College, Poughkeepsie, New York.

== Family life ==
Guernsey married Josephine Frances Lyford on June 16, 1887, in Vinal Haven, Maine. They had a son, Thompson L. Guernsey, who was born at Dover on February 17, 1904.

== Legal career ==
Guernsey studied law in the office of Honorable Willis E. Parsons, of Foxcroft, Maine. He was admitted to the bar in September, 1890 and commenced practice in Dover, Maine.

== Early political career ==
Guernsey was elected treasurer of Piscataquis County, Maine in September, 1890, and he was re-elected twice, serving in this office until December 31, 1896.

== Service in the Maine legislature ==
Guernsey served as member of the Maine House of Representatives from 1897 to 1899. He served in the Maine Senate in 1903.

== Congressional service ==
Guernsey was elected as a Republican to the Sixtieth Congress to fill the vacancy caused by the death of Llewellyn Powers. Guernsey was reelected to the Sixty-first and to the three succeeding Congresses and served from November 3, 1908, to March 3, 1917. He did not run for reelection but was an unsuccessful candidate for the Republican nomination for Senator.

== 1908 Republican National Convention ==
Guernsey served as delegate to the Republican National Convention in 1908.

== Later business career ==
In 1905 Guernsey was elected as the president of the Piscataquis Savings Bank. He was also a trustee of the University of Maine.

== Death and burial ==
Guernsey died in Boston, Massachusetts, January 1, 1927. He was interred in Dover Cemetery, Dover-Foxcroft, Maine.

== End notes ==
U.S. House of Representatives
Preceded by Llewellyn Powers	Member of the U.S. House of Representatives from Maine's 4th congressional district November 3, 1908 – March 3, 1917	Succeeded by Ira G. Hersey
Business positions
Preceded by unk	President of Piscataquis Savings Bank; 1905–	Succeeded by unk.
