= Chester, Maine =

- Town
- Logo

- Location within Maine Location within the United States
- Coordinates: 45°25′54″N 68°31′08″W
- Country: United States
- State: Maine
- County: Penobscot

Area
  - Total: 45.83 sq mi (118.70 km^{2})
  - Land: 45.83 sq mi (118.70 km^{2})
  - Water: 0 sq mi (0 km^{2})
- Elevation: 220 ft (67 m)

Population (2020)
  - Total: 549
  - Density: 12/sq mi (4.6/km^{2})
- Time zone: UTC-5 (Eastern (EST))
  - Summer (DST): UTC-4 (EDT)
- ZIP Code: 04457
- Area code: 207
- FIPS code: 23-12525
- GNIS feature ID: 582408
- Website: chesterme.org

Chester is a town in Penobscot County, Maine, United States. The population was 549 at the 2020 census.

It is part of the Bangor Metropolitan Statistical Area.

== Geography ==
According to the United States Census Bureau, the town has a total area of 45.83 square miles (118.70 km^{2}), all land. Chester's well known Pea Ridge is the town's cultural epicenter.

== Demographics ==
Historical population
| Census | Pop. | Note | %± |
|---|---|---|---|
| 1840 | 277 | | — |
| 1850 | 340 | | 22.7% |
| 1860 | 318 | | −6.5% |
| 1870 | 350 | | 10.1% |
| 1880 | 362 | | 3.4% |
| 1890 | 368 | | 1.7% |
| 1900 | 363 | | −1.4% |
| 1910 | 349 | | −3.9% |
| 1920 | 285 | | −18.3% |
| 1930 | 253 | | −11.2% |
| 1940 | 258 | | 2.0% |
| 1950 | 256 | | −0.8% |
| 1960 | 261 | | 2.0% |
| 1970 | 255 | | −2.3% |
| 1980 | 434 | | 70.2% |
| 1990 | 442 | | 1.8% |
| 2000 | 525 | | 18.8% |
| 2010 | 546 | | 4.0% |
| 2020 | 549 | | 0.5% |
U.S. Decennial Census

=== 2010 census ===
As of the census of 2010, there were 546 people, 218 households, and 164 families living in the town. The population density was 11.9 inhabitants per square mile (4.6/km^{2}). There were 266 housing units at an average density of 5.8 per square mile (2.2/km^{2}). The racial makeup of the town was 98.7% White, 0.4% Native American, 0.2% Asian, and 0.7% from two or more races. Hispanic or Latino of any race were 0.2% of the population.

There were 218 households, of which 23.4% had children under the age of 18 living with them, 62.4% were married couples living together, 7.8% had a female householder with no husband present, 5.0% had a male householder with no wife present, and 24.8% were non-families. 17.0% of all households were made up of individuals, and 4.1% had someone living alone who was 65 years of age or older. The average household size was 2.50 and the average family size was 2.79.

The median age in the town was 44.9 years. 17.8% of residents were under the age of 18; 10.2% were between the ages of 18 and 24; 22.1% were from 25 to 44; 33.8% were from 45 to 64; and 15.9% were 65 years of age or older. The gender makeup of the town was 51.1% male and 48.9% female.

=== 2000 census ===
As of the census of 2000, there were 525 people, 201 households, and 142 families living in the town. The population density was 11.8 inhabitants per square mile (4.6/km^{2}). There were 223 housing units at an average density of 5.0 per square mile (1.9/km^{2}). The racial makeup of the town was 98.67% White, 0.38% African American, 0.19% Native American, 0.19% Pacific Islander, 0.38% from other races, and 0.19% from two or more races.

There were 201 households, out of which 35.8% had children under the age of 18 living with them, 61.2% were married couples living together, 7.0% had a female householder with no husband present, and 28.9% were non-families. 22.4% of all households were made up of individuals, and 10.4% had someone living alone who was 65 years of age or older. The average household size was 2.61 and the average family size was 3.09.

In the town, the population was spread out, with 24.8% under the age of 18, 8.8% from 18 to 24, 31.2% from 25 to 44, 26.1% from 45 to 64, and 9.1% who were 65 years of age or older. The median age was 38 years. For every 100 females there were 101.9 males. For every 100 females age 18 and over, there were 97.5 males.

The median income for a household in the town was $36,250, and the median income for a family was $40,938. Males had a median income of $42,222 versus $17,679 for females. The per capita income for the town was $14,600. About 12.4% of families and 16.7% of the population were below the poverty line, including 17.7% of those under age 18 and 7.3% of those age 65 or over.

== Notable person ==
- Mark Alton Barwise, spiritualist, state senator
