= F. Eugene Farnsworth =

American activist and klansman (1868–1926)

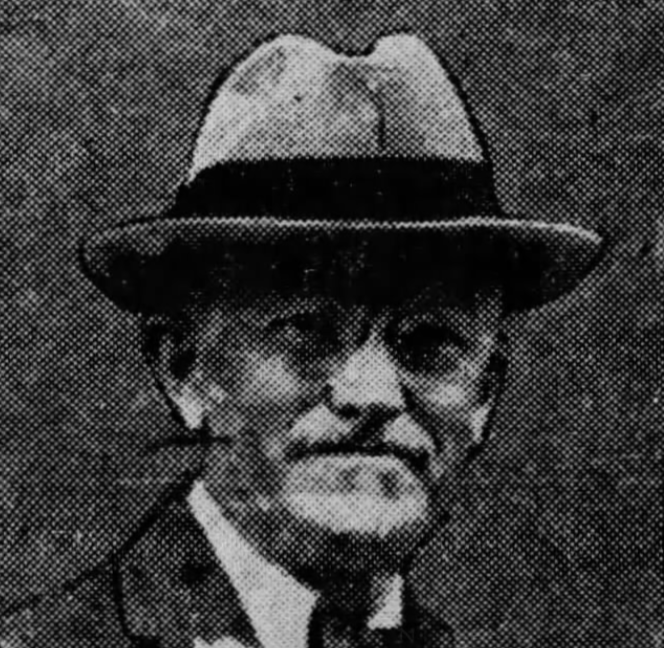
Portrait in The Boston Globe, March 1926.

Frank Eugene Farnsworth (February 16, 1868 – March 15, 1926) was an American political organizer who was best known for being King Kleagle of the Ku Klux Klan in Maine. Based in Portland, Maine, Farnsworth recruited thousands of men and women to the Ku Klux Klan during the group's peak from 1923 to 1924.

Farnsworth was born in 1868 in Columbia Falls, Maine, and grew up in St. Stephen, New Brunswick. He resided in St. Stephen until 1892 when he returned to the United States and moved to Fitchburg, Massachusetts, where he worked as a barber. In 1901, while performing as a magician in Rhode Island, Farnsworth accidentally killed his assistant with a boulder and was charged with manslaughter, but was released after paying court fees.

In 1920, Farnsworth was President of the Loyal Coalition, a Boston-based organization dedicated to "good government" and keeping “the hyphenates from controlling America.” In particular, it opposed Irish independence. However, by January 1923, Farnsworth turned his full attention to organizing the Ku Klux Klan in Maine.
