= Hodgdon C. Buzzell =

American lawyer and politician (1878–1948)

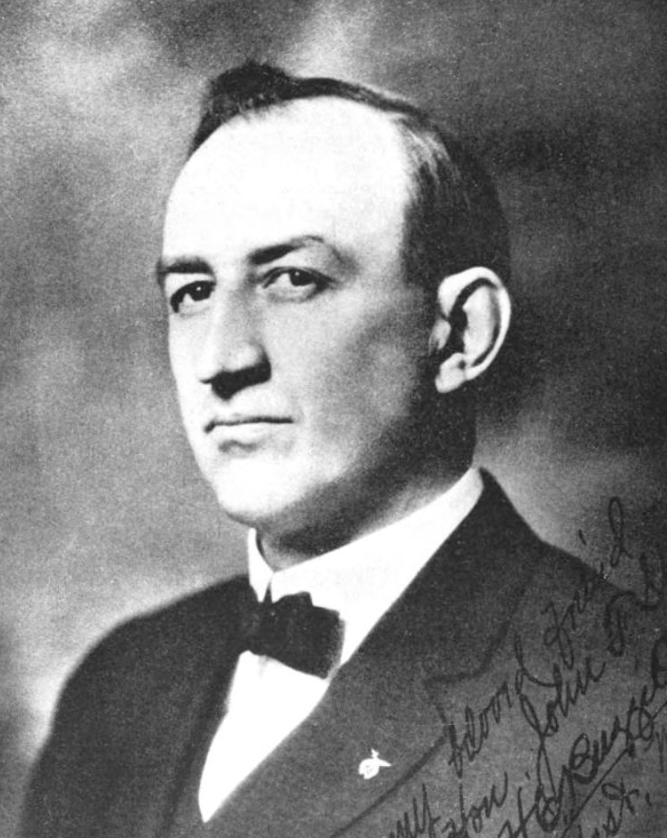

Mayor of Belfast, Maine
- In office 1942

Member of the Maine House of Representatives
- In office 1916–1920, 1939

Member of the Maine Senate
- In office 1922–1926

Personal details
- Born: Hodgdon Charles Buzzell; 1878
- Died: September 12, 1948 (aged 70) Lewiston, Maine, US
- Occupation: Lawyer

Hodgdon Charles Buzzell (1878 – September 12, 1948) was an American lawyer and politician from Maine. Buzzell, a Republican from Belfast, was elected to six terms in the Maine Legislature, including four in the Maine House of Representatives and two in the Maine Senate. Backed by the Ku Klux Klan, Buzzell unsuccessfully sought the Republican nomination for United States Senate in a special election in 1926.

== Career ==
Buzzell was first elected to the House in 1916, and was re-elected in 1918 and 1920. In 1922, he successfully sought a seat in the Senate. Following re-election to that body in 1924, Buzzell was chosen as the Senate President from 1925 to 1926. Buzzell left the Senate in 1926 and unsuccessfully sought his party's nomination for United States Senate to replace the recently deceased Bert M. Fernald. The New York Times described him as "avowedly" the Ku Klux Klan's candidate in the primary. He was defeated in that bid by the anti-Klan Arthur R. Gould of Presque Isle.

In 1939, he returned to the House for his fourth and final term. In 1942, he was elected mayor of Belfast. He also served a Waldo County Judge of Probate.

== Death ==
He died on September 12, 1948, at Saint Mary's Hospital in Lewiston, Maine after suffering a cerebral hemorrhage while at the Lewiston Fairgrounds after watching two of his horses race earlier in the day.
