= Mark Alton Barwise =

American politician (1881–1937)

from his obituary, 3 June 1939, "Bangor Daily Commercial"

Mark Alton Barwise (June 6, 1881 – May 29, 1937) was an American member of the Spiritualist religion elected to a state office.

Born in Chester, Maine of a mediumistic mother, Barwise became an attorney and nationally prominent member of the National Spiritualist Association (N.S.A.). He wrote extensively on spiritualism, represented the church in court cases, served on its board of trustees, and became Curator of its Bureau of Phenomenal Evidence. He was elected to the Maine House of Representatives from Bangor (Penobscot County), serving from 1921 to 1924, and in 1925 to the Maine State Senate.

== Political career ==
Barwise's political career was defined by his championing of a controversial amendment to the state constitution prohibiting the use of any public funds by private institutions. "The Barwise Bill" was widely interpreted as an attack on Maine's growing Catholic school system by the Protestant majority, and was called a "Klan measure" by one newspaper. Although Barwise's ties to the Ku Klux Klan (if any) are unknown, Maine saw significant Klan activity in the 1920s, directed against the local Catholic population, which the controversy surrounding the Barwise Bill only helped inflame. It is entirely possible, also, that Barwise was happy to help inflame this controversy. Within Spiritualist publications, Barwise was an outspoken opponent of the Catholic Church in America, particularly when any representative of the Church opposed legislation Barwise championed. For example, when Cardinal O'Connell declared the Church's opposition to compulsory prohibition, Barwise accused Catholic Church officials of requiring American Catholics to "regard themselves as Catholics first and Americans second," and be willing to oppose civil law when it conflicts with church doctrine. "Real Americans," Barwise argued, have "first allegiance . . . to the Constitution, and not to a Prince of a Foreign Potentate who happens to live in a cathedral palace in Boston." Whatever his opinions of the Catholic Church were, however, Barwise's relationship to the Klan remained ambiguous. In 1923, during what one politician called "temporary hysteria" over increased Klan activity in the Maine, Barwise contributed to the downfall of an anti-Klan bill that he had helped author ("an act to prevent crime by persons masked or disguised") by giving it only "half-hearted support" when it was presented. When asked whether he believed the bill should be enacted, he stated that, while he did care about law and order, he did not care "about the squabbles between the Klan and the Knights of Columbus." "I do not think this legislation is really necessary," he concluded. The bill died in committee.

The Barwise Bill, on the other hand, was defeated in the Maine House in 1923 after heated debate. It was defeated a second time in 1925 after then-Senator Barwise re-introduced a modified version of it. Barwise may have been considered an effective sponsor and spokesman for an anti-Catholic measure precisely because he was not a mainstream Protestant. The year Barwise left state office (1925), his Senate colleague Owen Brewster, who had introduced a similar bill on the same issue, was elected Governor of Maine with Klan support.

Despite its sectarian effects, the Barwise Bill may also have originated from Barwise's personal convictions that church (and not just the Catholic Church) and state be fully separated. He had begun his political career, in 1921, by introducing a bill to repeal an old yet widely violated law requiring businesses to close on Sunday. This was as unpopular with the Protestant majority as with Catholics, and was defeated in the Maine House by a wide margin (107 to 15).

Regardless of whether he was tied to the Klan, Barwise was clearly a racist. At the 1924 NSA convention in Los Angeles, Barwise led the faction which moved to expel the church's many black members and force them to establish a separate association.

== Religious activities ==
Barwise published numerous essays and short articles on spiritualism, including the 64-page booklet "A Preface to Spiritualism" (1938), and the chapter on spiritualism in Charles Samuel Braden's Varieties of American Religion (1936). With Rev. Thomas Grimshaw, Superintendent of Education of the N.S.A., he organized a correspondence course on spiritualism in the 1930s. He was also associated with "Camp Etna", a prominent spiritualist summer camp outside of Bangor in Etna, Maine, whose charismatic leader was the medium Mary Scannell Pepper Vanderbilt. Barwise contributed an essay to Vanderbilt's 1921 festschrift, Mary S. Vanderbilt: A Twentieth Century Seer (1921).
