= DeForest H. Perkins =

American educator and political activist

DeForest Henry Perkins

Personal details
- Born: December 24, 1872 North Brooksville, Maine, U.S
- Died: August 7, 1936 (aged 63) Portland, Maine, U.S.
- Education: University of Maine
- Occupation: Educator, real estate developer, Ku Klux Klan leader

DeForest Henry Perkins (December 24, 1872 – August 7, 1936) was an American educator, real estate developer, and political activist who was the Grand Dragon of the Ku Klux Klan in Maine from 1925 to 1928. Perkins served as Superintendent of Portland Public Schools from 1911 – 1918. He was then hired as secretary of the Portland Chamber of Commerce from 1918 – 1921. During his time as Grand Dragon, the Klan experienced both its peak in political strength before dramatically declining. of the Klan's ascendency nationally, and in Maine. He resigned in 1928 after a Klan-backed Republican candidate for U.S. Senator, Ralph Owen Brewster, lost his primary contest to Senator Frederick Hale, signaling the eclipse of the Klan as a force in Maine politics.

== Personal and early life ==
Perkins was born in North Brooksville, Maine to Charles N. Perkins and Ruth Grindle. His father was a sea captain, storekeeper, and farmer who served two terms in the Maine House of Representatives as a Republican. A Methodist, he attended East Maine Conference Seminary in Bucksport, Maine but left before graduating. He married Jennie Powers on August 1, 1900.

In 1890, at the age of 18, Perkins was hired as a schoolteacher in rural Aroostook County, Maine. In the winter of 1896, Perkins joined the Freemasons. After teaching for six years, he enrolled at the University of Maine. Perkins was elected Sophomore Class President in 1897 at the age of 25. He graduated from Maine in 1900 with a Bachelor of Philosophy. Five years later, he earned a Master of Arts in History from Maine. He also attended summer schools at the University of Chicago and Indiana University Bloomington. Perkins returned again to public education when he became principal of Freedom Academy in Freedom, Maine. He later became Superintendent of Schools, first in Skowhegan & Madison, and then in Portland which was the largest school district in the state. In November 1910, he was elected President of the Maine Teachers' Association while working as the superintendent of schools of Madison, Maine and Skowhegan, Maine. He held the position as MTA president until the following year. He was also a serious candidate for Maine's Superintendent of Schools. In 1915, Sprague's Journal of Maine History described Perkins as "one of the ablest school officers in New England". In 1918 Perkins resigned his superintendency to become Executive Secretary of the Portland Chamber of Commerce. He was also President of the Portland Rotary Club (1916–17), a Four Minute Man during World War I, and a board member of United Americans, a short-lived super-patriotic, anti-communist organization.

== Ku Klux Klan and later life ==
In January 1925, Perkins spoke at a public hearing of the Maine Legislature regarding altering the direct nomination primary system. He claimed that "we are ready, the fight is on, and 10,000 Knights of the Ku Klux Klan will stand behind the Direct Primary." Six months later in July 1925, he was publicly introduced as Grand Dragon of the Maine realm of the Ku Klux Klan. During his time in that position, the Klan focused primarily on influencing state politics. He was a staunch supporter of Governor Ralph Owen Brewster. In 1926, Perkins was accused of conspiring with the Republican Governor and the Klan's Imperial Wizard, Hiram Wesley Evans in a Washington, D.C. hotel room, to sabotage the candidacy of a Republican candidate for the U.S. Senate, Arthur R. Gould. Brewster and Perkins denied the charge, and Gould was elected with an overwhelming majority. Brewster's subsequent primary loss to another anti-Klan candidate, Frederick Hale, in the next senatorial election of 1928 spelled the end of the Klan as an effective political force.

Perkins was involved in real estate speculation throughout the 1920s. When the building boom slowed at the end of the decade, Perkins lost most of his property to his partners or to foreclosure. Perkins spent the final six years of his life (1930-1936) as a resident of Paris, Maine (now West Paris), where he was a shopkeeper. He died of appendicitis in a Portland hospital in 1936 and is interred at Wayside Cemetery in West Paris.

== See also ==
- Ku Klux Klan in Maine
