= List of United States political families (C) =

The following is an alphabetical list of political families in the United States whose last name begins with C.

== The Cabaniss and McRaes ==
- Thomas Banks Cabaniss (1835–1915), Georgia State Representative 1865–67, Solicitor General in Georgia, Georgia State Senator 1878–80 1884–86, U.S. Representative from Georgia 1893–95, Mayor of Forsyth, Georgia 1910; Forsyth, Georgia Circuit Court Judge 1912–13. Cousin of Thomas Chipman McRae.
- Thomas Chipman McRae (1851–1929), Arkansas State Representative 1877–79, Arkansas Presidential Elector 1880, delegate to the Democratic National Convention 1884 1896 1900, U.S. Representative from Arkansas 1885–1903, delegate to the Arkansas Constitutional Convention 1918, Governor of Arkansas 1921–25. Cousin of Thomas Banks Cabaniss.
  - Thomas Chipman McRae IV (1938–2004), delegate to the Arkansas Constitutional Convention 1979, candidate for Governor of Arkansas 1990. Great-grandson of Thomas Chipman McRae.

== The Cabells ==
- Benjamin W.S. Cabell (1793–1862), member of the Virginia Legislature. Father of William Lewis Cabell and George Craighead Cabell.
  - William Lewis Cabell (1827–1911), Mayor of the City of Dallas in 1874–76, 1877–79, 1883–85; delegate to the Democratic National Convention 1884 1892. Son of Benjamin W.S. Cabell.
  - George Craighead Cabell (1836–1906), Commonwealth Attorney of Danville, Virginia 1858–61; U.S. Representative from Virginia 1875–87. Son of Benjamin W.S. Cabell.
    - Benjamin Earl Cabell (1858–1931), Mayor of the City of Dallas, Texas, in 1900–04. Son of William Lewis Cabell.
      - Earle Cabell (1906–1975), Mayor of the City of Dallas, Texas, in 1961–64; in 1965–73, he was a Democratic Party Texas U.S. Representative. Son of Benjamin Earl Cabell (1858–1931).

== The Cables ==
- Joseph Cable (1801–1880), U.S. Representative from Ohio 1849–53. Great-grandfather of John L. Cable.
  - John L. Cable (1884–1971), prosecuting attorney of Allen County, Ohio 1917–21; U.S. Representative from Ohio 1921–25 1929–33. Great-grandson of Joseph Cable.

== The Cabots ==
- George Cabot (1752–1823), U.S. Senator from Massachusetts, appointed but declined to be first Secretary of the Navy
  - Great-grandson, Henry Cabot Lodge (1850–1924) – U.S. Senator from Massachusetts and ardent opponent of Woodrow Wilson's League of Nations
      - Great-great-great grandson, Henry Cabot Lodge Jr. (1902–1985), U.S. Senator from Massachusetts, incumbent 1952 U.S. Senate candidate from Massachusetts against John F. Kennedy, U.S. Ambassador to United Nations and South Vietnam, and 1960 vice presidential candidate for Richard Nixon against Kennedy-Lyndon B. Johnson
        - Great-great-great-great grandson, George C. Lodge (1927–2026), 1962 U.S. Senate candidate from Massachusetts against Edward M. Kennedy
      - Great-great-great grandson, John Davis Lodge (1903–1985) – 64th governor of Connecticut
- Samuel Cabot (1758–1819), one of George Cabot's brothers, ancestor of:
  - Great-great-grandson, John Moors Cabot (1901–1981), U.S. Ambassador to Sweden, Colombia, Brazil, and Poland during the Eisenhower and Kennedy administration

== The Cadwaladers ==
- Thomas Cadwalader (1708–1779), New Jersey House Burgess, Philadelphia Common Councilman; Pennsylvania Colony Councilman 1755–75. Father of John Cadwalader and Lambert Cadwalader.
  - John Cadwalader (1742–1786), Maryland Assemblyman. Son of Thomas Cadwalder.
  - Lambert Cadwalader (1742–1823), Pennsylvania Colony Assemblyman, member of the Philadelphia, Pennsylvania Committee of Correspondence; delegate to the Pennsylvania Constitutional Convention 1776; Delegate to the Continental Congress from New Jersey 1785–87; U.S. Representative from New Jersey 1789–91 1793–95. Son of Thomas Cadwalader.
    - Samuel Ringgold (1770–1829), Maryland House Delegate 1795, Maryland State Senator 1801–06, U.S. Representative from Maryland 1810–15 1817–21. Son-in-law of John Cadwalader.

NOTE: Lambert Cadwalader was also brother-in-law of Continental Congressional Delegate Samuel Meredith.

== The Cadys ==
- Daniel Cady (1773–1859), New York Assemblyman 1808–13, Supervisor of Johnstown, New York 1809–10; District Attorney in New York 1813; U.S. Representative from New York 1815–17; Justice of the New York Supreme Court 1847–55; Judge of Court of Appeals. Uncle of John W. Cady.
  - John W. Cady (1790–1854), Clerk of Johnstown, New York 1814 1816–17; Supervisor of Montgomery County, New York 1818–22 1826–29; New York Assemblyman 1822; U.S. Representative from New York 1823–25; District Attorney of Fulton County, New York 1840–46; Justice of the Peace of Johnstown, New York 1853. Nephew of Daniel Cady.

== The Caffertas and Vucanoviches ==
- Barbara Vucanovich (1921–2013), U.S. Representative from Nevada 1983–97. Mother of Patricia Dillon Cafferta.
  - Patricia Cafferata (born 1940), Treasurer of Nevada, District Attorney in Nevada. Daughter of Barbara Vucanovich.

== The Cafferys ==
- Donelson Caffery (1835–1906), U.S. Senator from Louisiana 1893–1901. Grandfather of Patrick T. Caffery.
  - Patrick T. Caffery (1932–2013), Louisiana State Representative 1964–1968, U.S. Representative from Louisiana 1969–73. Grandson of Donelson Caffery.

== The Cains ==
- Burl Cain (born 1942), Warden of the Louisiana State Penitentiary since 1995
- James David Cain (born 1938), member of the Louisiana House of Representatives 1972–92, member of the Louisiana State Senate 1992–2008, brother of Burl Cain
  - James D. Cain Jr. (born 1964), Judge of the United States District Court for the Western District of Louisiana 2019–present. Son of James David Cain.

== The Calabreses ==
- Anthony O. Calabrese (1907–1991), Ohio state senator 1956–80
  - Anthony O. Calabrese Jr., Ohio state representative 1960–66, judge of the Cuyahoga County, Ohio, Court of Common Pleas 1991–2003, judge of the Ohio Court of Appeals, Eighth Appellate District 2003–present.

== The Calderons ==
- Charles Calderon (born 1950), California state senator 1990–1998, majority leader 1996–1998; California state assemblymember 1982–1990 and 2006–2012, majority leader 2010–12; husband of Lisa Calderon, brother of Ron Calderon, brother of Tom Calderon, father of Ian Calderon
  - Ian Calderon (born 1985), California state assemblymember 2012–2020, majority leader 2016–2020; son of Ian Calderon, stepson of Lisa Calderon, nephew of Ron Calderon, nephew of Tom Calderon
- Tom Calderon (born 1954), California state assemblymember 1998–2002; brother of Charles Calderon, brother of Tom Calderon, brother-in-law of Lisa Calderon, uncle of Ian Calderon
- Ron Calderon (born 1957), California state senator 2006–2014; California state assemblymember 2002–2006; brother of Charles Calderon, brother of Tom Calderon, brother-in-law of Lisa Calderon, uncle of Ian Calderon
- Lisa Calderon (born 1965), California state assemblymember 2020–present; second wife of Charles Calderon, stepmother of Ian Calderon, sister-in-law of Ron Calderon, sister-in-law of Tom Calderon

== The Calhoons and McWillies ==
- William McWillie (1795–1869), South Carolina State Senator 1836–40, U.S. Representative from Mississippi 1849–51, Governor of Mississippi 1857–59. Father-in-law of S. S. Calhoon.
  - Adam McWillie (1821-1861), political candidate.
  - S. S. Calhoon (1838–1908), Circuit Court Judge in Mississippi 1876–82, delegate to the Democratic National Convention 1888, delegate to the Mississippi Constitutional Convention 1890, Justice of the Mississippi State Supreme Court 1900–08. Son-in-law of William McWillie.

NOTE: S. S. Calhoon was also son of Kentucky State Representative George Calhoon.

== The Calhouns and Pickens ==
- John E. Colhoun (1749–1802), member of the South Carolina Legislature, U.S. Senator from South Carolina 1801–02. First cousin of Joseph Calhoun and John Caldwell Calhoun.
- Joseph Calhoun (1750–1817), South Carolina State Representative 1804–05, U.S. Representative from South Carolina 1807–11. First cousin of John E. Colhoun and John Caldwell Calhoun.
- John Caldwell Calhoun (1782–1850), South Carolina State Representative 1808, U.S. Representative from South Carolina 1811–17, U.S. Secretary of War 1817–25, Vice President of the United States 1825–32, U.S. Senator from South Carolina 1832–43 1845–50, U.S. Secretary of State 1844–45. First cousin and son-in-law of John E. Colhoun and first cousin of Joseph Calhoun.
- Andrew Pickens (1739–1817), South Carolina State Representative 1781–94 1800–12, delegate to the South Carolina Constitutional Convention 1790, U.S. Representative from South Carolina 1793–95, candidate for U.S. Senate from South Carolina 1797. Brother-in-law of John E. Colhoun.
  - Thomas Green Clemson (1807–1888), U.S. Chargé d'affaires to Belgium 1844–51. Son-in-law of John Caldwell Calhoun.
  - Andrew Pickens (1779–1838), Governor of South Carolina 1816–18. Son of Andrew Pickens.
  - James Calhoun (1811–1875), Georgia Assemblyman, Georgia State Senator, Mayor of Atlanta 1862–65. Cousin of John Caldwell Calhoun.
    - Francis W. Pickens (1805–1869), South Carolina State Representative 1832–34, U.S. Representative from South Carolina 1834–43, South Carolina State Senator 1844–46, U.S. Minister to Russia 1858–60, Governor of South Carolina 1860–62. Son of Andrew Pickens.
    - William Lowndes Calhoun (1837–1908), Georgia legislator 1872–76, Mayor of Atlanta, Georgia 1879–81; Judge of the Court of Ordinary of Fulton County, Georgia 1881–87. Son of James Calhoun.
      - Matthew C. Butler (1836–1909), South Carolina State Representative 1860 1866, candidate for Lieutenant Governor of South Carolina 1870, U.S. Senator from South Carolina 1877–95. Son-in-law of Francis W. Pickens.

NOTE: Matthew C. Butler was also son of U.S. Representative William Butler, grandson of U.S. Representative William Butler, nephew of U.S. Senator Andrew Pickens Butler and South Carolina Governor Pierce M. Butler, first cousin of Rhode Island legislator James DeWolf Perry, and first cousin by marriage of U.S. diplomat August Belmont.

== The Calls and Collins ==
- Richard K. Call (1792–1862), U.S. Congressional Delegate from Florida Territory 1823, Governor of Florida Territory 1836–39 1841–44, candidate for Governor of Florida 1845. Uncle of Wilkinson Call.
  - Wilkinson Call (1834–1910), U.S. Senator from Florida 1879–97. Nephew of Richard K. Call and cousin of James D. Walker.
    - LeRoy Collins (1909–1991), Florida State Representative 1934–40, Florida State Senator 1940–54, Governor of Florida 1955–61, candidate for U.S. Senate from Florida 1968. Great-grandson-in-law of Richard K. Call.
      - LeRoy Collins Jr., candidate for Republican nomination for U.S. Senate from Florida 2006. Son of LeRoy Collins.

== The Calverts ==
- Cecilius Calvert (1605–1675), Proprietor of Maryland Colony 1632–75. Brother of Leonard Calvert.
- Leonard Calvert (1606–1647), Governor of Maryland Colony 1634–47. Brother of Cecilius Calvert.
  - Charles Calvert (1637–1715), Deputy Governor of Maryland Colony 1661–75, Governor of Maryland Colony 1675–89. Son of Cecilius Calvert.
    - Benedict Calvert (1679–1715), Governor of Maryland Colony. Son of Charles Calvert.
      - Charles Calvert (1699–1751), Proprietor of Maryland Colony 1715–51, Governor of Maryland Colony 1721–27. Son of Benedict Calvert.
      - Benedict Leonard Calvert, Governor of Maryland Colony 1727–31. Son of Benedict Calvert.
        - Frederick Calvert (1731–1771), Proprietor of Maryland 1751–71. Son of Charles Calvert.
        - Robert Eden (1741–1784), Governor of Maryland Colony 1769–76. Son-in-law of Charles Calvert.

NOTE: Cecilius Calvert was also Governor of Newfoundland Colony. Benedict Calvert was also a member of the British Parliament for Harwich. Cecilius and Leonard Calvert's father, George, was Proprietor of the Province of Avalon. Benedict Calvert's great-great-great-granddaughter, Mary Anna Custis Lee, was also step-great-granddaughter of U.S. President George Washington and connected to the Lee family.

== The Camachos ==
- Carlos Camacho (1924–1979), Governor of Guam 1969–75. Father of Felix Perez Camacho.
  - Felix Perez Camacho (born 1957), Governor of Guam 2003–2011. Son of Carlos Camacho.

== The Camerons ==
- William Cameron (1795–1877), delegate to the Republican National Convention 1860. Brother of Simon Cameron.
- Simon Cameron (1799–1889), U.S. Senator from Pennsylvania 1845–49 1857–61 1867–77, U.S. Secretary of War 1861–62, U.S. Minister to Russia 1862. Brother of William Cameron.
  - J. Donald Cameron (1833–1918), U.S. Secretary of War 1876–77, U.S. Senator from Pennsylvania 1877–97, Chairman of the Republican National Committee 1879–80. Son of Simon Cameron.
    - J. G. Bradley, delegate to the Republican National Convention 1916. Grandson of Simon Cameron.
      - William Clark (1891–1957), Judge of the United States District Court for the District of New Jersey 1925–38, Judge of the United States Court of Appeals for the Third Circuit 1938–43. Grandson of J. Donald Cameron.
        - Anne Clark Martindell (1914–2008), New Jersey State Senator 1974–77, United States Ambassador to New Zealand and Samoa 1979–81. Daughter of William Clark.

NOTE: J. Donald Cameron was also nephew-in-law of U.S. Secretary of State and of the Treasury John Sherman and U.S. Secretary of War William Tecumseh Sherman. J.G. Bradley was also grandson of U.S. Supreme Court Justice Joseph P. Bradley and grandson-in-law of U.S. Secretary of State Thomas F. Bayard, Sr.

== The Camdens ==
- Johnson N. Camden (1828–1908), prosecuting attorney of Braxton County, West Virginia; prosecuting attorney of Nicholas County, West Virginia; candidate for Governor of West Virginia 1868 1872; U.S. Senator from West Virginia 1881–87 1893–95. Father of Johnson N. Camden Jr.
  - Johnson N. Camden Jr. (1865–1942), U.S. Senator from Kentucky 1914–15. Son of Johnson N. Camden.

== The Campbells ==
- Lewis D. Campbell (1811–1882), candidate for U.S. Representative from Ohio 1840 1842 1844 1858, U.S. Representative from Ohio 1849–58 1871–72, U.S. Minister to Mexico 1866–67, Ohio State Senator 1869–70, delegate to the Ohio Constitutional Convention 1873. Uncle of James E. Campbell.
  - James E. Campbell (1843–1924), U.S. Representative from Ohio 1884–89, Governor of Ohio 1890–92, delegate to the Democratic National Convention 1892 1920 1924, candidate for Governor of Ohio 1895. Nephew of Lewis D. Campbell.

== The Campbells of South Carolina ==
- John Campbell (1795–1845), U.S. Representative from South Carolina 1829–31 1837–45. Brother of Robert B. Campbell.
- Robert B. Campbell, candidate for U.S. Representative from South Carolina 1820, U.S. Representative from South Carolina 1823–25 1834–37, South Carolina State Senator, South Carolina State Representative 1840, U.S. Consul in Havana, Cuba 1842–50; U.S. Consul in London 1854–61. Brother of John Campbell.

== The Campbells of South Carolina (II) ==
- Carroll Campbell Jr. (1940–2005), candidate for South Carolina State Representative 1969, South Carolina State Representative 1970–74, delegate to the Republican National Convention 1976 1980 1984 1988 1992, candidate for Lieutenant Governor of South Carolina 1974, South Carolina State Senator 1976–78, U.S. Representative from South Carolina 1979–87, Governor of South Carolina 1987–95, candidate for Republican nomination for President of the United States 1996. Father of Mike Campbell.
  - Mike Campbell, candidate for the Republican nomination for Lieutenant Governor of South Carolina 2006. Son of Carroll Campbell Jr.

== The Campbells of Virginia ==
- David Campbell (1779–1859), Virginia State Senator 1820–24, Governor of Virginia 1837–40. Brother of John Campbell.
- John Campbell, Treasurer of the United States 1829–39. Brother of David Campbell.
- William Bowen Campbell, 14th governor of Tennessee from 1851 to 1853 and the state's last Whig governor; also served four terms in the United States House of Representatives, from 1837 to 1843, and from 1866 to 1867.

== The Candlers ==
- William Candler (1736–1784), member of the Georgia Legislature. Grandfather of Daniel Gill Candler.
  - Daniel Gill Candler (1812–1887), Mayor of Gainesville, Georgia. Grandson of William Candler.
    - Allen D. Candler (1834–1910), Mayor of Gainesville, Georgia; Georgia State Representative 1873–77; Georgia State Senator 1878–79; U.S. Representative from Georgia 1883–91; Georgia Secretary of State 1894–98; Governor of Georgia 1898–1902. Son of Daniel Gill Candler.
    - Milton A. Candler (1837–1909), Georgia State Representative 1861–63, delegate to the Georgia Constitutional Convention 1865, Georgia State Senator 1868–72, delegate to the Democratic National Convention 1872 1876, U.S. Representative from Georgia 1875–79. Cousin of Allen D. Candler.
      - Ezekiel S. Candler Jr. (1862–1944), Alcorn County, Mississippi Democratic Committeeman; U.S. Representative from Mississippi 1901–21; Mayor of Corinth, Mississippi 1933–37. Nephew of Milton A. Candler.
      - Charles Murphey Candler, Georgia State Representative 1886–1904 1907–08, Georgia State Senator 1905–06. First cousin of Ezekiel S. Candler Jr.

NOTE: Allen D. Candler and Milton A. Candler were also second cousins once removed of U.S. Representative Mark Anthony Cooper and third cousins once removed of U.S. Senator Joseph Meriwether Terrell. Milton A. Candler was also son-in-law of U.S. Representative Charles Murphey.

== The Candlers of Georgia ==
- Samuel C. Candler (1809–1873), Georgia State Representative, Georgia State Senator, delegate to the Democratic National Convention 1860. Father of Asa Griggs Candler and John S. Candler.
  - Asa Griggs Candler (1851–1929), Mayor of Atlanta 1917–19. Son of Samuel C. Candler.
  - John Slaughter Candler (1861–1941), Georgia Superior Court Judge 1896–1902, Justice of the Georgia Supreme Court 1902–06. Son of Samuel C. Candler.

== The Cannons ==
- See Cannon family

== The Cannons of Delaware ==
- William Cannon (1809–1865), Governor of Delaware 1863–65. Father of Philip L. Cannon.
  - Philip L. Cannon, Lieutenant Governor of Delaware 1901–05. Son of William Cannon.

== The Cantwells ==
- Paul F. Cantwell, Marion County, Indiana Commissioner; Indianapolis, Indiana Councilman; Indiana State Legislator. Father of Maria Cantwell.
  - Maria Cantwell (born 1958), Washington State Representative 1987–93, U.S. Representative from Washington 1993–95, U.S. Senator from Washington 2001–present. Daughter of Paul F. Cantwell.

== The Capertons ==
- Hugh Caperton (1781–1847), Sheriff of Monroe County, Virginia 1805; Virginia House Delegate 1810–13 1826–30; U.S. Representative from Virginia 1813–15. Father of Allen T. Caperton.
  - Allen T. Caperton (1810–1876), Virginia House Delegate 1841–42 1857–61, Virginia State Senator 1844–48, delegate to the Virginia Constitutional Convention 1850 1861, Confederate States Senator from Virginia 1864–65, U.S. Senator from Virginia 1875–76. Son of Hugh Caperton.

== The Cappers and Crawfords ==
- Samuel J. Crawford (1835–1913), Kansas State Representative 1861, Republican National Committeeman 1866–68, Governor of Kansas 1865–68. Father-in-law of Arthur Capper.
  - Arthur Capper (1865–1951), Governor of Kansas 1915–19, U.S. Senator from Kansas 1919–49, delegate to the Republican National Convention 1936. Son-in-law of Samuel J. Crawford.

== The Cappses ==
- Walter Capps (1934–1997), U.S. Representative from California 1997.
- Lois Capps (born 1938), U.S. Representative from California 1998–2017.

== The Caraways ==
- Thaddeus H. Caraway (1871–1931), U.S. Representative from Arkansas 1913–21, U.S. Senator from Arkansas 1921–31.
- Hattie Wyatt Caraway (1878–1950), U.S. Senator from Arkansas 1931–45. Wife of Thaddeus H. Caraway.
  - Paul Caraway (1905–1985), High Commissioner of the United States Civil Administration of the Ryukyu Islands 1961–64. Son of Thaddeus H. Caraway and Hattie Wyatt Caraway.

== The Cardins ==
- Meyer M. Cardin, Maryland House Delegate 1935–39, Baltimore, Maryland Circuit Court Judge 1961–77. Brother of Maurice A. Cardin.
- Maurice A. Cardin, Maryland House Delegate 1951–66. Brother of Meyer M. Cardin.
  - Benjamin L. Cardin (born 1943), Maryland House Delegate 1967–86, U.S. Representative from Maryland 1987–2007, U.S. Senator from Maryland 2007–present. Son of Meyer M. Cardin.
    - Jon S. Cardin, Maryland House Delegate 2003–15 2019–present. Nephew of Benjamin L. Cardin.

== The Cardozos ==
- Albert Cardozo (1828–1885), Justice of the New York Supreme Court. Father of Benjamin N. Cardozo.
  - Benjamin N. Cardozo (1870–1938), Justice of the New York Supreme Court 1914–17, Judge of the New York Court of Appeals 1914–26, Chief Judge of the New York Court of Appeals 1927–32, Justice of the U.S. Supreme Court 1932–38. Son of Albert Cardozo.

== The Carews and Magners ==
- Thomas F. Magner (1860–1945), New York Assemblyman 1888, U.S. Representative from New York 1889–95. Uncle of John F. Carew.
  - John F. Carew (1873–1951), New York Assemblyman 1904, delegate to the Democratic National Convention 1912 1924, U.S. Representative from New York 1913–29, Justice of the New York Supreme Court 1929–43. Nephew of Thomas F. Magner.

== The Careys ==
- Joseph M. Carey (1845–1924), U.S. Attorney of Wyoming Territory 1869–71, Justice of the Wyoming Territory Supreme Court 1871–76, Republican National Committeeman 1876–97, Mayor of Cheyenne, Wyoming 1881–85; U.S. Congressional Delegate from Wyoming Territory 1885–90; U.S. Senator from Wyoming 1890–95; Governor of Wyoming 1911–15. Father of Robert D. Carey.
  - Robert D. Carey (1878–1937), Progressive Party National Committeeman 1912–16, Governor of Wyoming 1919–23, U.S. Senator from Wyoming 1930–37. Son of Joseph M. Cary.

== The Carlinos ==
- Lorenzo Carlino (1890–1943), Long Beach, New York Republican Leader 1937–1943, Candidate for Mayor of Long Beach 1937. Father of Joseph F. Carlino
  - Joseph F. Carlino (1917–2006), Member of New York State Assembly 1945–1964, Majority Leader 1955–1959, Speaker of Assembly 1959–1964, alternate delegate to 1956 Republican National Convention, Delegate to 1960 and 1964 Republican National Convention, Long Beach, New York Republican Leader 1943–1964, Nassau County, New York Republican chairman 1959–1964, son of Lorenzo Carlino.

== The Carlisles and Goodsons ==
- John A. Goodson, Kentucky State Representative, Mayor of Covington, Kentucky 1860–64. Father-in-law John G. Carlisle.
  - John G. Carlisle (1835–1910), Kentucky State Representative 1859–61, Kentucky State Senator 1866–71, delegate to the Democratic National Convention 1868, Lieutenant Governor of Kentucky 1871–75, U.S. Representative from Kentucky 1877–90, Speaker of the U.S. House of Representative 1883–89, candidate for the Democratic nomination for President of the United States 1884, U.S. Senator from Kentucky 1890–1893, U.S. Secretary of the Treasury 1893–97. Son-in-law of John A. Goodson.

== The Carltons ==
- Doyle E. Carlton (1887–1972), Florida State Senator 1917–19, Governor of Florida 1929–33, delegate to the Democratic National Convention 1948. Relative of Vassar B. Carlton.
- Vassar B. Carlton, Justice of the Florida Supreme Court 1969–74. Relative of Doyle E. Carlton.

== The Carmichaels ==
- Jesse M. Carmichael, Probate Court Judge of Dale County, Alabama; Auditor of Alabama; Alabama Assemblyman; Alabama State Senator; Alabama Secretary of State; Circuit Court Judge in Alabama. Father of Archibald Hill Carmichael.
  - Archibald Hill Carmichael (1864–1947), Alabama Solicitor 1890–94, Alabama State Representative 1907–11 1915–19, delegate to the Democratic National Convention 1916 1928 1932, Alabama State Senator 1919–23, member of the Alabama State Board of Education 1919–47, member of the Tuscumbia, Alabama Board of Education 1920–47; U.S. Representative from Alabama 1933–37. Son of Jesse M. Carmichael.

== The Carmichaels of Maryland ==
- William Carmichael (1739–1795), Delegate to the Continental Congress from Maryland 1778–79, U.S. Chargé d'affaires to Spain 1782–94. Grand-uncle of Richard Bennett Carmichael.
  - Richard Bennett Carmichael (1807–1884), Maryland House Delegate 1831 1841–66, U.S. Representative from Maryland 1833–35, delegate to the Democratic National Convention 1856 1864 1868 1876, Judge of Maryland Circuit Court 1858–64, Judge of Queen Anne's County, Maryland Court 1861; President of the Maryland Constitutional Convention 1867. Grandnephew of William Carmichael.

== The Carnahans ==
- A. S. J. Carnahan (1897–1968), U.S. Representative from Missouri, 1945–47 and 1949–61; U.S. Ambassador to Sierra Leone, 1961–63.
  - Mel Carnahan (1934–2000), governor of Missouri, 1993–2000; died in plane crash while running for United States Senate, posthumously elected; son of A.S.J. Carnahan, husband of Jean Carnahan.
  - Jean Carnahan (1933-2024), wife of Mel Carnahan, appointed to Senate in his stead, 2000, served 2001–02; mother of Russ and Robin Carnahan.
    - Russ Carnahan (born 1958), U.S. Representative from Missouri, 2005–13; son of Mel and Jean Carnahan.
    - Robin Carnahan (born 1961), Missouri Secretary of State, 2005–13; U.S. Administrator of General Services, 2021-2025; daughter of Mel and Jean Carnahan.

== The Carrs ==
- Francis Carr (1751–1821), Massachusetts State Representative 1791–95 1801–03, Massachusetts State Senator 1809–11, U.S. Representative from Massachusetts 1812–13. Father of James Carr.
  - James Carr (1777–1818), Massachusetts State Representative 1806–11, U.S. Representative from Massachusetts 1815–17. Son of Francis Carr.

== The Carrs of North Carolina ==
- Elias Carr (1839–1900), 48th Governor of North Carolina 1893–1897
- Eleanor Kearny Carr (1840–1912), First Lady of North Carolina 1893–1897. Wife of Elias Carr.
- Julian S. Carr (1845–1924), industrialist. Cousin of Elias Carr.
- William A. Guthrie (1846–1916), lawyer and political candidate. Brother-in-law of Julian S. Carr
  - Mary Hilliard Hinton (1869–1961), State Regent of the North Carolina Society Daughters of the American Revolution. Niece of Elias Carr.

== The Carringtons and Prestons ==
- James H. Preston (1860–1938), Maryland House Delegate 1890–94, Mayor of Baltimore, Maryland 1911–19; delegate the Democratic National Convention 1912. Father-in-law of Edward C. Carrington Jr.
  - Edward C. Carrington Jr. (1872–1938), delegate to the Republican National Convention 1912, candidate for U.S. Senate from Maryland 1914, candidate for Borough President of Manhattan, New York City 1931. Son-in-law of James H. Preston.

NOTE: Edward C. Carrington Jr. was also grandson of U.S. Attorney Edward Carrington.

== The Carrolls ==
The Carrolls of Maryland were a very active family during the early history of the United States

- Charles Carroll, Barrister (1723–1783), delegate to the Continental Congress from Maryland, 1776–77.
- Daniel Carroll (1730–1796), delegate to Continental Congress from Maryland, 1781–83; signer of Articles of Confederation, 1781; member of the United States Constitutional Convention, 1787; U.S. Representative from Maryland, 1789–91; first cousin of Charles the Barrister and Charles of Carrollton.
  - Richard Brent (1757–1814), U.S. Representative from Virginia, 1795–99 and 1801–03; U.S. Senator from Virginia, 1809–14; nephew of Daniel Carroll.
    - William Leigh Brent (1784–1848), U.S. Representative from Louisiana, 1823–29; nephew of Richard Brent.
- John Carroll (1735–1815), First Roman Catholic Bishop of Baltimore, brother of Daniel, first cousin of Charles the Barrister and Charles of Carrollton.
- Charles Carroll of Carrollton (1737–1832), delegate to the Continental Congress from Maryland, 1776–81; signer of the United States Declaration of Independence, 1776; U.S. Senator from Maryland, 1789–92; first cousin of Charles the Barrister, Daniel and John.
  - Charles H. Carroll (1794–1865), U.S. Representative from New York, 1843–47; great-grandson of Daniel Carroll.
  - John Lee Carroll (1830–1911), Governor of Maryland, 1876–80; great-grandson of Charles Carroll of Carrollton.

== The Carrolls of Tennessee ==
- William Carroll (1788–1844), Governor of Tennessee 1821–27 1829–35. Father of William Henry Caroll.
  - William Henry Carroll (1810–1868), Postmaster in Tennessee. Son of William Carroll.

== The Carsons ==
- Julia Carson (1938–2007), Indiana State Representative 1972–76, Indiana State Senator 1976–90, U.S. Representative from Indiana 1997–2007. Grandmother of André Carson.
  - André Carson (born 1974), Indianapolis Councilman 2007–08; U.S. Representative from Indiana 2008–present. Grandson of Julia Carson.

== The Carters of Georgia ==
- James Earl Carter Sr. (1894–1953), Member of Georgia House of Representatives, 1953. Father of Jimmy Carter.
  - Hugh Carter (1920–1999), Georgia State Senator, 1967–81. First cousin of Jimmy Carter.
  - Jimmy Carter (1924–2024) Governor of Georgia, 1971–75; President of the United States, 1977–81.
    - Jack Carter (born 1947), 2006 Democratic nominee for U.S. Senate from Nevada.
      - Jason Carter (born 1975), Georgia State Senator, 2010–2015.
  - Billy Carter (1937–1988), mayoral candidate for Plains, Georgia, in 1976

== The Carters of Kentucky ==
- J.C. Carter (1863–1949), Circuit Court Judge in Kentucky, delegate to the Republican National Convention 1932. Father of James C. Carter Jr. and Tim Lee Carter.
  - James C. Carter Jr. (1903–1998), Kentucky State Representative 1936–37, delegate to the Republican National Convention 1960. Son of J.C. Carter.
  - Tim Lee Carter (1910–1987), U.S. Representative from Kentucky 1965–81, delegate to the Republican National Convention 1972. Son of J.C. Carter.

== The Carters, Graysons, Monroes, Orrs, and Smallwoods ==
- William Grayson (1740–1790), Virginia House Delegate 1784–85 1788, Delegate to the Continental Congress from Virginia 1785–87, U.S. Senator from Virginia 1789–90. Cousin of James Monroe.
- James Monroe (1758–1831), Virginia House Delegate 1782 1786 1810–11, Delegate to the Continental Congress from Virginia 1783–86, U.S. Senator from Virginia 1790–94, U.S. Minister to France 1794–96, Governor of Virginia 1799–1802 1811, U.S. Minister to Great Britain 1803–07, U.S. Secretary of State 1811–14 1815–17, U.S. Secretary of War 1814–15, President of the United States 1817–25, delegate to the Virginia Constitutional Convention 1829. Cousin of William Grayson.
- William Smallwood (1732–1792), Governor of Maryland 1785–88, Maryland State Senator 1791–92. Brother-in-law of William Grayson.
  - Alexander Orr (1761–1835), member of the Kentucky Legislature, U.S. Representative from Kentucky 1791–97. Nephew of William Grayson.
  - James Monroe (1799–1870), U.S. Representative from New York 1839–41, member of the New York Legislature. Nephew of James Monroe.
    - William Grayson Carter, Kentucky State Senator 1834–38. Grandson of William Grayson.

NOTE: James Monroe was also nephew of Continental Congressional Delegate Joseph Jones, distant cousin of Kentucky Secretary of State Thomas Monroe.

== The Carterets ==
- George Carteret (1610–1680), Proprietor of Carolina Colony. Cousin of Philip Carteret and Peter Carteret.
- Philip Carteret (1639–1682), Governor of New Jersey Colony 1665–72. Cousin of George Carteret.
- Peter Carteret, Governor of Albemarle Colony. Cousin of George Carteret.

== The Cases ==
- Leopold Case Sr. (1786–1864), Ohio State Representative 1824–27. Father of William Case.
  - William Case (1818–1862), Mayor of Cleveland, Ohio 1850–52. Son of Leopold Case Sr.

== The Cases and Holts ==
- Clifford P. Case (1904–1982), Rahway, New Jersey Councilman 1938–42; New Jersey Assemblyman 1943–45; U.S. Representative from New Jersey 1945–53; U.S. Senator from New Jersey 1955–79; candidate for Republican nomination for President of the United States 1968. Grandfather of Matthew Holt.
  - Matthew Holt, Mayor of Clinton, New Jersey; member of the Hunterdon County, New Jersey Board of Chosen Freeholders. Grandson of Clifford P. Case.

== The Caseys of Illinois ==
- Zadok Casey (1796–1862), Illinois House of Representatives 1822–26, 1848–52; Illinois Senate 1828–30, 1860–62; Lieutenant Governor of Illinois 1830–33; U.S. Representative 1833–43
  - Maj. Samuel K. Casey (1817–1871), Illinois Senate 1868–72
  - Dr. Newton R. Casey (1826–1899), Illinois House of Representatives 1866–70, 1872–74
  - Thomas S. Casey (1832–1891), Illinois House of Representatives 1870–72, Illinois Senate 1872–76, Illinois Appellate Court 1879–85, Illinois Circuit Courts 1879–85

== The Caseys of Pennsylvania ==
The Caseys are a family originally from New York City, but settled in Scranton, Pennsylvania after World War II.

- Bob Casey Sr. (January 9, 1932 – May 30, 2000), unsuccessful candidate for Governor of Pennsylvania in 1966, 1970, 1978; Auditor General of Pennsylvania 1969–77; Governor of Pennsylvania 1987–95.
  - Bob Casey Jr. (born April 13, 1960), Auditor General of Pennsylvania 1997–2005; Treasurer of Pennsylvania 2005–06; US Senator 2007-2025; son of Bob Casey Sr.
  - Patrick Casey, candidate for U.S. Representative from Pennsylvania 1998 2000. Son of Robert P. Casey Sr.

== The Casses and Ballengers ==
- Lewis Cass (1782–1866), U.S. Representative from Ohio 1806–07, Governor of Michigan 1813–31, U.S. Secretary of War 1831–36, U.S. Minister to France 1836–42, U.S. Senator from Michigan 1845–48 1849–57, candidate for President of the United States 1848, U.S. Secretary of State 1857–60. Great-great grandfather of Cass Ballenger.
  - Cass Ballenger (1926–2015), North Carolina State Representative 1974–76, North Carolina State Senator 1976–86, U.S. Representative from North Carolina 1986–2005. Great-great grandson of Lewis Cass.

== The Castors ==
- Elizabeth Castor (born 1941), Florida State Senator 1977–78 1983–86, delegate to the Democratic National Convention 2004, candidate for U.S. Senate from Florida 2004. Wife of Samuel P. Bell III.
- Samuel P. Bell III, Florida State Representative 1980. Husband of Elizabeth Castor.
  - Katherine A. Castor (born 1966), member of Hillsborough County, Florida Board of Commissioners 2002–06; U.S. Representative from Florida 2007–present. Daughter of Elizabeth Castor.

== The Catrons ==
- John Catron (1786–1865), prosecuting attorney of Sparta, Tennessee. 1815–18, Judge of the Tennessee Supreme Court of Errors and Appeals 1824–34, Justice of the Supreme Court of the United States 1837–65. Second cousin of Thomas B. Catron.
- Thomas B. Catron (1840–1921), Attorney General of New Mexico Territory 1869–72, U.S. Attorney of New Mexico Territory 1872–78, New Mexico Territory Councilman 1884, U.S. Congressional Delegate from New Mexico Territory 1895–97, U.S. Senator from New Mexico 1912–17. Second cousin of John Catron. Father of Charles C. Catron.
  - Charles C. Catron (1879–1951), Justice of the New Mexico Supreme Court 1929–31. Son of Thomas B. Catron.

== The Catts ==
- Sidney Johnston Catts (1863–1936), Governor of Florida 1917–21. Father of Sidney Johnston Catts Jr.
  - Sidney Johnston Catts Jr., delegate to the Democratic National Convention 1940. Son of Sidney Johnston Catts.

== The Cavanaughs ==
- John J. Cavanaugh III - Nebraska State Senator, 1973-1977, U.S. Representative from Nebraska, 1977-1981. Father of Machaela Cavanaugh, and John J. Cavanaugh Jr.
  - Machaela Cavanaugh - Nebraska State Senator, 2019-present. Daughter of John J. Cavanaugh III, sister of John J. Cavanaugh Jr.
  - John J. Cavanaugh Jr. - Nebraska State Senator, 2021-present. Son of John J. Cavanaugh III, brother of Machaela Cavanaugh.

== The Celebrezzes ==
See Celebrezze family

== The Chafees ==
- John Chafee (1922–1999), Governor of Rhode Island 1963–69, U.S. Secretary of the Navy 1969–72, U.S. Senator from Rhode Island 1976–99. Father of Lincoln Chafee.
  - Lincoln Chafee (1953–present), Mayor of Warwick RI 1992–99, U.S. Senator from Rhode Island 1999–2007, Governor of Rhode Island 2011–2015, 2016 presidential candidate. Son of John Chafee.

NOTE: See also The Lippitts.

== The Chaffees and Grants ==
- Jerome B. Chaffee (1825–1886), Colorado Territory Representative 1861–63, Republican National Committeeman 1866–68 1870–72, delegate to the Republican National Convention 1868, U.S. Congressional Delegate from Colorado Territory 1871–75, U.S. Senator from Colorado 1876–79, Chairman of the Colorado Republican Party 1884. Father-in-law of Ulysses S. Grant Jr.
  - Ulysses S. Grant Jr. (1852–1929), delegate to the Republican National Convention 1896. Son-in-law of Jerome B. Chaffee.

NOTE: Ulysses S. Grant Jr. was also son of U.S. President Ulysses S. Grant and brother of U.S. Minister Frederick Dent Grant.

== The Chalmers ==
- John G. Chalmers (1801–1847), member of the Virginia Legislature, Texas Republic Secretary of the Treasury 1841. Brother of Joseph W. Chalmers.
- Joseph W. Chalmers (1806–1853), U.S. Senator from Mississippi 1845–47. Brother of John G. Chalmers.
  - James Ronald Chalmers (1831–1898), Mississippi State Senator 1876–77, U.S. Representative from Mississippi 1877–82. Son of Joseph W. Chalmers.
  - H.H. Chalmers, Justice of the Mississippi Supreme Court 1898. Son of Joseph W. Chalmers.

== The Chambers ==
- Henry H. Chambers (1790–1826), delegate to the Alabama Constitutional Convention 1819, Alabama State Representative 1820, candidate for Governor of Alabama 1821 1823, U.S. Senator from Alabama 1925–1826. Father of Henry Cousins Chambers.
  - Henry Cousins Chambers (1823–1871), member of the Mississippi Legislature 1859, Confederate States Representative from Mississippi 1862–65. Son of Henry H. Chambers.

== The Chambers and Coxes ==
- James M. Cox (1870–1957), U.S. Representative from Ohio 1909–13, Governor of Ohio 1913–15 1917–21, candidate for President of the United States 1920. Father of Anne Cox Chambers.
  - Anne Cox Chambers (1919-2020), U.S. Ambassador to Belgium 1977–81. Daughter of James M. Cox.

== The Chamberlains ==
- William Chamberlain (1755–1828), Vermont State Representative 1785 1787–96 1805 1808, delegate to the Vermont Constitutional Convention 1791 1814, Vermont Governor's Councilman 1796–1803, U.S. Representative from Vermont 1803–05 1809–1911, Lieutenant Governor of Vermont 1813–15. Grandfather of Joshua Chamberlain.
  - Joshua Chamberlain (1828–1914), Governor of Maine 1867–71. Grandson of William Chamberlain.

== The Chandlers ==
- Albert Benjamin "Happy" Chandler I (1898–1991) was a governor of Kentucky, a U.S. Senator and the Baseball Commissioner who oversaw the initial steps toward integration of the major leagues, beginning with the debut of Jackie Robinson with the Brooklyn Dodgers in 1947. .
  - Albert Benjamin "Ben" Chandler III (born 1959) is an American politician from Kentucky and grandson of "Happy" Chandler. He was the democratic candidate for governor in 2003 and member of the House of Representatives for the sixth district of Kentucky from 2004 to 2013.

== The Chandlers of Maine ==
- John Chandler (1762–1841), Massachusetts State Senator 1803–05, U.S. Representative from Massachusetts 1805–09, Sheriff of Kennebec County, Maine; member of the Massachusetts General Court 1819; Maine State Senator 1819–20; U.S. Senator from Maine 1820–29. Brother of Thomas Chandler.
- Thomas Chandler (1772–1866), New Hampshire State Senator 1817–19 1825–28, New Hampshire State Representative 1828, U.S. Representative from New Hampshire 1829–33. Brother of John Chandler.
  - Zachariah Chandler (1813–1879), Mayor of Detroit, Michigan 1851–52; U.S. Senator from Michigan 1857–75 1879; U.S. Secretary of the Interior 1875–77; Chairman of the Republican National Committee 1876–79. Nephew of John Chandler and Thomas Chandler.
    - Eugene Hale (1836–1918), prosecuting attorney of Hancock County, Maine; member of Maine Legislature the 1867–68; U.S. Representative from Maine 1869–79; U.S. Senator from Maine 1881–1911. Son-in-law of Zachariah Chandler.
      - Chandler Hale (1873–1951), Third Assistant Secretary of State 1909–13. Son of Eugene Hale.
      - Frederick Hale (1874–1963), Maine State Representative 1905–06, Republican National Committeeman 1912–18, U.S. Senator from Maine 1917–41. Son of Eugene Hale.
        - Rodney D. Chandler (born 1942), Washington State Representative, U.S. Representative from Washington 1983–93. Great-great-grandnephew of Zachariah Chandler.

NOTE: Fredrick Hale was also cousin of U.S. Representative Robert Hale, who was the son of District Court Judge Clarence Hale.

== The Chandlers of Tennessee ==
- Walter Chandler (1887–1967), Tennessee State Representative 1917, Tennessee State Senator 1921, U.S. Representative from Tennessee 1935–40, Mayor of Memphis, Tennessee 1940–46 1955; delegate to the Democratic National Convention 1940 1944. Father of J. Wyeth Chandler.
  - J. Wyeth Chandler (1930–2004), Mayor of Memphis, Tennessee 1972–82; Circuit Court Judge in Tennessee 1982–96. Son of Walter Chandler.

== The Chandlers and Hales ==
- John P. Hale (1806–1873), New Hampshire State Representative 1832, U.S. Attorney of New Hampshire 1834–41, U.S. Representative from New Hampshire 1843–45, U.S. Senator from New Hampshire 1847–53 1855–65, candidate for President of the United States 1852, U.S. Minister to Spain 1865–69. Father-in-law of William E. Chandler.
  - William E. Chandler (1835–1917), New Hampshire State Representative 1862–1964 1881, delegate to the Republican National Convention 1868 1880, Republican National Committeeman, delegate to the New Hampshire Constitutional Convention 1876 1902, U.S. Secretary of the Navy 1882–85, U.S. Senator from New Hampshire 1887–89 1889–1901. Son-in-law of John P. Hale.
    - John P.H. Chandler Jr. (1911–2001), New Hampshire State Representative 1943, New Hampshire Governor's Councilman 1953–59, delegate to the Republican National Convention 1956 1960 1972 1980, New Hampshire State Senator 1961, candidate for U.S. Representative from New Hampshire 1962. Grandson of William E. Chandler.

== The Chanlers ==
- John W. Chanler (1826–1877), New York Assemblyman 1858–59, candidate for U.S. Representative from New York 1860, U.S. Representative from New York 1863–69. Father of William A. Chanler and Lewis Stuyvesant Chanler.
  - William A. Chanler (1867–1934), New York Assemblyman 1897, U.S. Representative from New York 1899–1901. Son of John W. Chanler.
  - Lewis Stuyvesant Chanler (1869–1942), Lieutenant Governor of New York 1907–08, candidate for Governor of New York 1908, New York Assemblyman 1910–12. Son of John W. Chanler.

== The Chaos and McConnells ==
- Mitch McConnell (born 1942), Acting United States Assistant Attorney General for the Office of Legislative Affairs 1975, Judge-Executive of Jefferson County 1978–84, U.S. Senator from Kentucky 1985–present.
- Elaine Chao (born 1953), Commissioner of the Federal Maritime Commission 1988–89, United States Deputy Secretary of Transportation 1989–91, Director of the Peace Corps 1991–92, United States Secretary of Labor 2001–09, United States Secretary of Transportation 2017–21, Wife of Mitch McConnell.

== The Chapmans ==
- John Grant Chapman (1798–1856), Maryland House Delegate 1824–32 1843–44, Maryland State Senator 1832–36, U.S. Representative from Maryland 1845–49. Father of Andrew Grant Chapman.
  - Andrew Grant Chapman (1839–1892), Maryland House Delegate 1867–68 1870 1872 1879 1885, U.S. Representative from Maryland 1881–83, delegate to the Democratic National Convention 1888. Son of John Grant Chapman.

== The Chases ==
- Harrie B. Chase (1889–1969), Associate Justice of the Vermont Supreme Court 1927–29, Judge of the United States Court of Appeals for the Second Circuit 1929–54.
- Paul A. Chase (1895–1963), Vermont State Representative 1947, Chairman of the Vermont Public Service Commission 1947–48, Judge of the Vermont Superior Court 1948–53, Associate Justice of the Vermont Supreme Court 1953–56. Brother of Harrie B. Chase.

== The Chases, Smiths and Spragues ==
- Dudley Chase (1771–1846), prosecuting attorney of Orange County, Vermont 1803–12; Vermont State Representative 1805–12 1823–24; delegate to the Vermont Constitutional Convention 1814 1822; U.S. Senator from Vermont 1813–17 1825–31; Chief Justice of the Vermont Supreme Court 1817–21. Uncle of Salmon P. Chase.
  - Salmon P. Chase (1808–1873), Cincinnati City Councilman 1840–49; U.S. Senator from Ohio 1849–55 1861; Governor of Ohio 1856–60; U.S. Secretary of the Treasury 1861–64; candidate for the Republican nominations for President of the United States 1864; Chief Justice of the United States 1864–73; candidate for the Democratic nomination for President of the United States 1868; candidate for President of the United States 1872. Nephew of Dudley Chase.
  - Horatio N. Smith (1820–1886), Wisconsin State Assemblyman 1849, Wisconsin State Senator 1853–54. Nephew by marriage of Dudley Chase.
    - William Sprague (1830–1915), Governor of Rhode Island 1860–63, U.S. Senator from Rhode Island 1863–75. Former son-in-law of Salmon P. Chase.

NOTE: Dudley Chase was also uncle of U.S. Representative Dudley C. Denison. William Sprague was also the nephew of U.S. Senator William Sprague III. William Sprague was also a distant cousin to Oregon Governor Charles A. Sprague.

== The Chavezes and Tristanis ==
- Dennis Chavez (1888–1962), member of the New Mexico Legislature, U.S. Representative from New Mexico 1930–34, U.S. Senator from New Mexico 1935–62. Grandfather of Gloria Tristani.
  - Gloria Tristani (born 1953), member of the New Mexico Corporation Commission 1994–97, member of the Federal Communications Commission 1997–2001, candidate for U.S. Senate from New Mexico 2002. Granddaughter of Dennis Chavez.

== The Cheathams ==
- Richard Cheatham (1799–1845), Tennessee State Representative 1833, delegate to the Tennessee Constitutional Convention 1834, candidate for U.S. Representative from Tennessee 1830 1832 1834, U.S. Representative from Tennessee 1837–39. Brother of Anderson Cheatham.
- Anderson Cheatham, Tennessee State Representative 1801–09 1819–21 1823–25. Brother of Richard Cheatham.
  - Edward Saunders Cheatham (1818–1878), Tennessee State Senator 1855–57 1861–63. Son of Richard Cheatham.
  - Richard Boone Cheatham (1824–1877), Tennessee State Representative 1859–61 1869–71, Mayor of Nashville, Tennessee 1860–62. Son of Richard Cheatham.
  - Boyd M. Cheatham, member of the Tennessee Legislature. Son of Richard Cheatham.

NOTE: Edward S. Cheatham was also son-in-law of U.S. Senator Ephraim Hubbard Foster.

== The Cheathams and Whites ==
- George Henry White (1852–1918), North Carolina State Representative 1881, North Carolina State Senator 1885, Solicitor in North Carolina 1886–94, prosecuting attorney in North Carolina 1886–94, delegate to the Republican National Convention 1896 1900, U.S. Representative from North Carolina 1897–1901. Brother-in-law of Henry P. Cheatham.
- Henry P. Cheatham (1857–1935), Register of Deeds of Vance County, North Carolina 1884–88; U.S. Representative from North Carolina 1889–93; candidate for the Republican nomination for U.S. Representative from North Carolina 1896; Recorder of Deeds of District of Columbia 1897–1901. Brother-in-law of George Henry White.

== The Cheneys and Perrys ==
- Richard B. Cheney (1941-2025), White House Chief of Staff 1975–77, U.S. Representative from Wyoming 1979–89, U.S. Secretary of Defense 1989–93, Vice President of the United States 2001–09. Husband of Lynne Cheney.
- Lynne Cheney (born 1941), chairwoman of the National Endowment for the Humanities, founder of the American Council of Trustees and Alumni, senior fellow in education and culture at the American Enterprise Institute for Public Policy Research, director of Reader's Digest Association, Inc., director emerita of the Independent Women's Forum, co-host of Crossfire, director of the Lockheed Corporation, former Republican Vice Presidential nominee
  - Elizabeth Cheney (born 1966), Deputy Assistant Secretary of State for Near Eastern Affairs 2002–03, Principal Deputy Assistant Secretary of State for Near Eastern Affairs 2005–06, Coordinator for Broader Middle East and North Africa Initiatives 2005–06. Former Fox contributor. Candidate for U.S. Senate in Wyoming in 2014. U.S. Representative from Wyoming 2017–present. Daughter of Richard B. Cheney and Lynne Cheney.
  - Philip Perry (born 1964), Associate Attorney General of the United States, General Counsel of the Office of Management and Budget, General Counsel to the Department of Homeland Security 2005–07. Husband of Elizabeth Cheney.

== The Cherrys and Farises ==
- Deborah Cherry (born 1954), Genesee County Commission (1988–1994); Michigan House of Representatives (1995–2000); Michigan Senate (2003–2010); Genesee County Treasurer (2010–2024). Brother of John D. Cherry.
- John D. Cherry (born 1951), Michigan House of Representatives (1983–1986); Michigan Senate (1987–2003); Lieutenant Governor of Michigan (2003-2011). Brother of Deborah Cherry; husband of Pam Faris.
- Pam Faris (born 1957), Michigan House of Representatives (2013–2019). Wife of John D. Cherry.
  - John Daniel Cherry (born 1985), Michigan House of Representatives (2019–2023); Michigan Senate (2023–present). Son of John D. Cherry and Pam Faris.

== The Chesnuts and Millers ==
- Stephen Decatur Miller (1787–1838), U.S. Representative from South Carolina 1817–19, Governor of South Carolina 1828–30, U.S. Senator from South Carolina 1831–33. Father-in-law of James Chesnut Jr.
  - James Chesnut Jr. (1815–1885), South Carolina State Representative 1842, South Carolina State Senator 1854, U.S. Senator from South Carolina 1858–60, Delegate to the Confederate States Provisional Congress from South Carolina 1861–62, candidate for Confederate States Senate from South Carolina 1861, delegate to the Democratic National Convention 1868. Son-in-law of Stephen Decatur Miller.

== The Childs and Hawleys ==
- Joseph R. Hawley (1826–1905), Governor of Connecticut 1866–67, delegate to the Republican National Convention 1868, U.S. Representative from Connecticut 1872–75 1879–81, U.S. Senator from Connecticut 1881–1905, candidate for the Republican nomination for President of the United States 1884. Brother-in-law of Samuel A. Childs.
- Samuel A. Childs, New York Assemblyman 1880. Brother-in-law of Joseph R. Hawley.

== The Chiles and Hagans ==
- Lawton Chiles (1930–1998), Florida State Representative, Florida State Senator, U.S. Senator from Florida 1971–89, Governor of Florida 1991–98. Uncle of Kay Hagan.
  - Kay Hagan (1953–2019), North Carolina State Senator, U.S. Senator from North Carolina 2009–15. Niece of Lawton Chiles.

== The Chiles and Trumans ==
- James Chiles (1802–1883), Missouri State Senator. Granduncle of Harry S. Truman.
  - Harry S. Truman (1884–1972), Jackson County, Missouri Judge 1922–24 1926–34; U.S. Senator from Missouri 1933–45; delegate to the Democratic National Convention 1940 1944 1952 1960; Vice President of the United States 1945; President of the United States 1945–53. Grandnephew of James Chiles.

== The Chiltons ==
- Thomas Chilton (1798–1854), Kentucky State Representative 1819, U.S. Representative from Kentucky 1927–1831 1833–35. Brother of William Parish Chilton.
- William Parish Chilton (1810–1871), member of the Alabama Legislature 1839, candidate for U.S. Representative from Alabama 1843, Justice of the Alabama Supreme Court 1852–56, Alabama State Senator 1859, Delegate to the Confederate States Provisional Congress from Alabama 1861–62, Confederate States Representative from Alabama 1862–65. Brother of Thomas Chilton.
  - Horace Chilton (1853–1932), U.S. Senator from Texas 1891–92 1895–1901. Grandson of Thomas Chilton.

== The Chiltons of West Virginia ==
- William E. Chilton (1858–1939), prosecuting attorney of Kanawha County, West Virginia 1883–84; candidate for West Virginia State Senate 1886; Chairman of the West Virginia Democratic Party 1892–96; West Virginia Secretary of State 1893–97; U.S. Senator from West Virginia 1911–17; candidate for U.S. Senate from West Virginia 1924 1934. Husband of Mary Louise Chilton.
- Mary Louise Chilton, delegate to the Democratic National Convention 1944. Wife of William E. Chilton.
  - William E. Chilton Jr., delegate to the Democratic National Convention 1932. Son of William E. Chilton and Mary Louise Chilton.
    - W.E. Chilton III (1921–1987), delegate to the Democratic National Convention 1948 1960, West Virginia House Delegate 1953–60. Son of William E. Chilton Jr.

== The Chinns and Withers ==
- Joseph Chinn (1798–1840), Jacksonian Representative to the United States House of Representatives 1831–35
- Dr. Joseph Graves Chinn (1797–1891), Mayor of Lexington, Kentucky 1868 and Lexington, Missouri
- Thomas Withers Chinn (1791–1852), U.S. Representative from Louisiana 1839–41. Cousin of Robert E. Withers.
- Robert E. Withers (1821–1907), Lieutenant Governor of Virginia, U.S. Senator from Virginia 1875–81, U.S. Consul in Hong Kong 1885–89. Cousin of Thomas Withers Chinn.
- R. Hart Chinn (1888–1972), Mayor of Biloxi, Mississippi 1933–34
- Withers A. Burress (1894–1977), Commander of the 100th Infantry Division (United States) during World War II 1942–45, Commander of the VII Corps (United States) during the beginning of the Cold War, and Commander of the First Army 1953–54

== The Chiodos ==
- Ned Chiodo (born 1942), Iowa State Representative 1977–85. Father of Frank Chiodo.
  - Frank Chiodo (born 1968), Iowa State Representative 1997–2005. Son of Ned Chiodo.

== The Chiperfields ==
- Burnett M. Chiperfield (1870–1940), Illinois State Representative 1903–13, candidate for U.S. Representative from Illinois 1912 1934, U.S. Representative from Illinois 1915–17 1930–33, candidate for U.S. Senate from Illinois 1916, delegate to the Republican National Convention 1920 1936. Father of Robert B. Chiperfield.
  - Robert B. Chiperfield (1899–1971), U.S. Representative from Illinois 1939–63. Son of Burnett M. Chiperfield.

== The Chipmans ==
- Nathaniel Chipman (1752–1843), Vermont State Representative 1784–85 1806–11, Justice of the Vermont Supreme Court, Chief Justice of the Vermont Supreme Court, U.S. District Court Judge of Vermont 1791–94, U.S. Senator from Vermont 1797–1803. Brother of Lemuel Chipman and Daniel Chipman.
- Lemuel Chipman (1754–1831), New York Assemblyman 1796–97 1800–01, New York State Senator 1801–05. Brother of Nathaniel Chipman and Daniel Chipman.
- Daniel Chipman (1765–1850), delegate to the Vermont Constitutional Convention 1793 1814 1836 1843 1850, Vermont State Representative 1798–1808 1812–14 1818 1821, Vermont Governor's Councilman 1808, U.S. Representative from Vermont 1815–16. Brother of Nathaniel Chipman and Lemuel Chipman.
  - Henry C. Chipman (1784–1867), Supreme Territorial Court of Michigan 1827–1832. Son of Nathaniel Chipman.
    - John Logan Chipman (1830–1893), Attorney of Detroit, Michigan 1857–60; Michigan State Representative 1865–66; candidate for U.S. Representative from Michigan 1866; Judge of the Detroit, Michigan Superior Court 1879–87; U.S. Representative from Michigan 1887–93. Grandson of Nathaniel Chipman.
    - John W. Brownson (1807–1860), New York State Senator 1848–49. Grandson of Nathaniel Chipman.

== The Chittendens ==
- Thomas Chittenden (1730–1797), President of the Vermont Republic; first Governor of Vermont.
  - Noah Chittenden (1753–1835), son of Thomas Chittenden. Sheriff of Addison County (1785–87), first sheriff of Chittenden County (1787–90), Member of the Vermont House of Representatives (1796, 1812–15), Member of the Governor's Council (1804–12), Assistant Judge of the Chittenden County Court (1804–1811), Chittenden County Probate Judge (1811–1812).
  - Martin Chittenden (1763–1840), Member of the United States House of Representatives; Governor of Vermont. Son of Thomas Chittenden.
  - Truman Chittenden (1770–1853), Son of Thomas Chittenden. Vermont Governor's Council (1815–1828), Member of the Vermont House of Representatives, Judge and Assistant Judge of the Chittenden County Court, Chittenden County Probate Judge.
    - Chittenden Lyon (1787–1842), Member of the Kentucky House of Representatives; Member of the Kentucky State Senate; member of the United States House of Representatives. Son of Matthew Lyon. Grandson of Thomas Chittenden.
      - Lucius E. Chittenden (1824–1900), Member of the Vermont State Senate; Register of the Treasury. Son of Giles Chittenden, grandson of Truman Chittenden, great-grandson of Thomas Chittenden.
      - William Peters Hepburn (1833–1916), Member of the United States House of Representatives from Iowa. Great-grandson of Matthew Lyon, great-great-grandson of Thomas Chittenden.

Notes: Matthew Lyon's second wife was Beulah Chittenden (1764–1824), the daughter of Thomas Chittenden and sister of Martin Chittenden.

The first wife of Governor Jonas Galusha (1753–1834) was Mary Chittenden (1758–1794), daughter of Thomas Chittenden and sister of Martin Chittenden.

United States Senator Willis Benson Machen (1810–1893) was married to Margaret A. Lyon, the daughter of Chittenden Lyon. In addition to being the son-in-law of Chittenden Lyon, he was the grandfather of Zelda Fitzgerald.

== The Choates ==
- George Choate, Massachusetts State Representative 1814–17 1819. Father of George Choate.
  - George Choate (1796–1880), Massachusetts State Representative. Son of George Choate.
  - Rufus Choate (1799–1859), Massachusetts State Representative 1825–26, Massachusetts State Senator 1827, U.S. Representative from Massachusetts 1831–34, U.S. Senator from Massachusetts 1841–45, Attorney General of Massachusetts 1853–54. Brother of George Choate.
    - William Gardner Choate, U.S. District Court Judge in New York 1878–81. Son of George Choate.
    - Joseph Hodges Choate (1832–1917), President of the New York Constitutional Convention 1894, candidate for U.S. Senate from New York 1897, U.S. Ambassador to Great Britain 1899–1905. Son of George Choate.

== The Christs ==
- Philip J. Christ (1872–1933), Supervisor of the Town of North Hempstead, New York 1907–1917, Chairman of Nassau County Board of Supervisors 1910–1917, Chairman of Nassau County, New York Democratic Party 1910. Father of Marcus G. Christ.
  - Marcus G. Christ (1900–1988), Nassau County, New York Court 1950–1953, State Supreme Court 1953–1959, Appellate Division Judge 1959–1976, Associate Justice 1959–1976, Presiding Justice 1970. Son of Philip J. Christ, father of M. Hallsted Christ.
    - M. Hallstead Christ, Nassau County, New York Comptroller 1973–1981, State Supreme Court Judge 1982–1992, son of Marcus G. Christ, father of Marcus Hallstead Christ Jr President, Nassau County Bar Association 1970–71.
      - Marcus Hallstead Christ Jr, lawyer for the office of general counsel of the Department of Health and Human Services in Baltimore

== The Churches ==
- Ralph E. Church (1883–1950), U.S. Representative from Illinois, 1935–41 and 1943–50.
- Marguerite S. Church (1892–1990), U.S. Representative from Illinois, 1951–63. Wife of Ralph E. Church.

== The Churches and Clarks ==
- Barzilla W. Clark (1880–1943), Mayor of Idaho Falls, Idaho, 1935; Governor of Idaho, 1937–39.
- Chase Addison Clark (1883–1966), Mayor of Idaho Falls, Idaho, 1937–38; Governor of Idaho 1941–43; Judge of the United States District Court for the District of Idaho 1943–64; brother of Barzilla W. Clark.
  - David Worth Clark (1902–1955), U.S. Representative from Idaho, 1935–39; U.S. Senator from Idaho, 1939–45; nephew of Barzilla W. Clark and Chase Addison Clark.
  - Robert E. Smylie (1914–2004), Attorney General of Idaho, 1947–55; Governor of Idaho 1955–67; brother-in-law of David Worth Clark.
  - Frank Church (1924–1984), U.S. Senator from Idaho, 1957–81; candidate for Democratic nomination for President, 1976; son-in-law of Chase Addison Clark.

== The Chutkans and Krauthamers ==
- Tanya S. Chutkan (born 1962), Judge of the United States District Court for the District of Columbia 2014–present.
- Peter A. Krauthamer, Associate Judge on the Superior Court of the District of Columbia 2012–present. Husband of Tanya S. Chutkan.

== The Cilleys ==
- Joseph Cilley (1734–1799), New Hampshire State Senator. Father of Bradbury Cilley.
  - Bradbury Cilley (1760–1831), U.S. Marshal of New Hampshire 1798–1802, U.S. Representative from New Hampshire 1813–17. Son of Joseph Cilley.
    - Joseph Cilley (1791–1887), U.S. Senator from New Hampshire 1846–47. Nephew of Bradbury Cilley.
    - Jonathan Cilley (1802–1838), Maine State Representative 1831–36, U.S. Representative from Maine 1837–38. Nephew of Bradbury Cilley.

== The Clagetts and Pettengills ==
- William H. Clagett (1838–1901), Nevada Territory Representative 1862–63, Nevada Assemblyman 1864–65, U.S. Congressional Delegate from Montana Territory 1871–73, President of the Idaho Constitutional Convention 1889, candidate for U.S. Senate from Idaho 1891 1895. Uncle of Samuel B. Pettengill.
  - Samuel B. Pettengill (1886–1974), U.S. Representative from Indiana 1931–39. Nephew of William H. Clagett.

== The Claibornes and Dallases ==
See Claiborne-Dallas-Pell family

== The Clancys ==
- Donald D. Clancy (1921–2007), Cincinnati Councilman 1952–60; Mayor of Cincinnati, Ohio 1958–60; U.S. Representative from Ohio 1961–77. Father of Patricia M. Clancy.
  - Patricia M. Clancy (born 1952), Ohio State Representative, Ohio State Senator 2004–07. Daughter of Donald D. Clancy.

== The Clardys ==
- Martin L. Clardy (1844–1914), U.S. Representative from Missouri 1879–89. First cousin once removed of Kit F. Clardy.
  - Kit F. Clardy (1892–1961), candidate for U.S. Representative from Missouri 1850 1856, U.S. Representative from Missouri 1853–55. First cousin once removed of Martin L. Clardy.

== The Clarks of Texas ==
- Tom C. Clark (1899–1977), U.S. Attorney-General 1945–49; Associate Justice of the U.S. Supreme Court, 1949–67
  - Ramsey Clark (1927–2021), U.S. Attorney General 1967–69, son of Tom C. Clark

NOTE: William F. Ramsey (1855–1922), Texas Supreme Court justice, was the father-in-law of Tom C. Clark and the grandfather of Ramsey Clark.

== The Clarks of Georgia and Texas ==
- Elijah Clarke (1742–1799), Georgia Assemblyman 1781–90. Father of John Clark.
  - John Clark (1766–1832), Governor of Georgia 1819–23. Son of Elijah Clarke.
    - John Archibald Campbell (1811–1889), Associate Justice of the Supreme Court of the United States 1853–61. Nephew of John Clark.
    - Edward Clark (1815–1880), delegate to the Texas Constitutional Convention 1845, Texas State Representative 1846, Texas State Senator 1847, Texas Secretary of State 1853–57, Governor of Texas 1861. Nephew of John Clark.
      - Ed Clark, U.S. Ambassador to Australia 1965–67. Descendant of Edward Clark.

== The Clarks of Kentucky, Missouri, and Virginia ==
- Christopher H. Clark (1767–1828), Virginia House Delegate 1790, U.S. Representative from Virginia 1804–06. Brother of James Clark.
- James Clark (1779–1839), Kentucky State Representative 1807–08, Judge of the Kentucky Court of Appeals 1810–12, U.S. Representative from Kentucky 1813–16 1825–31, Circuit Court Judge in Kentucky, Kentucky State Senator, Governor of Kentucky 1836–39. Brother of Christopher H. Clark.
  - John Bullock Clark (1802–1885), Clerk of Howard County, Missouri Courts 1824–34; Missouri State Representative 1850–51; U.S. Representative from Missouri 1857–61; Confederate States Senator from Missouri 1862–64; Confederate States Representative from Missouri 1864–65. Nephew of Christopher H. Clark and James Clark.
    - John Bullock Clark Jr. (1831–1903), U.S. Representative from Missouri 1873–83. Son of John Bullock Clark.

== The Clarks of Missouri ==
- James B. Clark (1850–1921), U.S. Representative from Missouri 1893–95 1897–1921, Speaker of the U.S. House of Representatives 1911–19. Father of Joel B. Clark.
  - Joel B. Clark (1890–1954), U.S. Senator from Missouri 1933–45, Judge of U.S. Court of Appeals of District of Columbia 1945–54. Son of James B. Clark.

NOTE: Joel B. Clark was also son-in-law of Democratic National Committeeman Wilbur W. Marsh.

== The Clarks of Mississippi ==
- Charles Clark (1811–1877), Governor of Mississippi 1863–65.
  - Charles Clark (1925–2011), Judge of the United States Court of Appeals for the Fifth Circuit 1969–92. Great-grandson of Charles Clark.

== The Clarks, Collins, Cooks, and Higgins ==
- John Cook (1730–1789), Sheriff of Kent County, Delaware; delegate to the Delaware Constitutional Convention 1776; Delaware Assemblyman 1776–77 1778–79 1783–84 1786–87; Delaware Councilman 1780–82 1787–89; President of Delaware 1782–83. Brother-in-law of Thomas Collins.
- Thomas Collins (1732–1789), Sheriff of Kent County, Delaware 1764–67; Delaware Colony Assemblyman; delegate to the Delaware Constitutional Convention 1776; Delaware Councilman 1776–83; Delaware Court of Common Pleas Judge 1782–86; President of Delaware 1786–89. Brother-in-law of John Cook.
  - John Clark (1761–1821), Sheriff of New Castle County, Delaware; Treasurer of Delaware 1794–99; Delaware State Representative 1799–1800; Governor of Delaware 1817–20. Son-in-law of John Cook.
    - Anthony Higgins (1840–1912), U.S. Attorney of Delaware 1869–76, candidate for U.S. Representative from Delaware 1884, U.S. Senator from Delaware 1889–95. Grandson of John Clark.

== The Clarks and Coopers ==
- William Cooper (1754–1809), U.S. Representative from New York 1795–97 1799–1801. Father of James Fenimore Cooper.
  - James Fenimore Cooper (1789–1851), U.S. Consul in Lyon, France 1826–28. Son of William Cooper.
    - Paul F. Clark (1861–1932), Nebraska State Representative, candidate for U.S. Representative from Nebraska 1912. Grandnephew of James Fenimore Cooper.

== The Clarks and Pidcocks ==
- James N. Pidcock (1836–1899), New Jersey State Senator 1877–80, delegate to the Democratic National Convention 1884 1888, U.S. Representative from New Jersey 1885–89. Cousin of Alvah A. Clark.
- Alvah A. Clark (1840–1912), U.S. Representative from New Jersey 1877–81, Postmaster of Somerville, New Jersey 1896–99. Cousin of James N. Pidcock.

== The Clarks and Ruckers ==
- William Clark (1770–1838), Governor of Missouri Territory 1813–20, candidate for Governor of Missouri 1820. Grandfather-in-law of Edgar P. Rucker.
  - Edgar P. Rucker (1861–1908), Attorney General of West Virginia 1897–1901. Grandson-in-law of William Clark.

== The Clarks and Williams ==
- Myron H. Clark (1806–1892), New York State Senator 1852–54, Governor of New York 1855–57, candidate for Governor of New York 1874. Grandfather of Clark Williams.
  - Clark Williams (1870–1946), New York Superintendent of Banks, Comptroller of New York 1909–10. Grandson of Myron H. Clark.

== The Clarkes ==
- Archibald S. Clarke (1788–1821), New York Assemblyman 1809–11, New York State Senator 1813–16, Clerk of Niagara County, New York 1815–16; U.S. Representative from New York 1816–17. Brother of Staley N. Clarke.
- Staley N. Clarke (1794–1860), Treasurer of Cattaraugus County, New York; U.S. Representative from New York 1841–43. Brother of Archibald S. Clarke.

== The Clarkes of New York ==
- John D. Clarke (1873–1933), U.S. Representative from New York, 1921–25 and 1927–33.
- Marian W. Clarke (1880–1953), U.S. Representative from New York, 1933–35. Wife of John D. Clarke.

== The Clasons ==
- Oliver B. Clason, Maine State Representative 1889–93, Mayor of Gardiner, Maine 1894–96; Maine Governor's Councilman 1895–97; Maine State Senator 1897–1901. Father of Charles R. Clason.
  - Charles R. Clason (1890–1985), candidate for U.S. Representative from Massachusetts 1934, U.S. Representative from Massachusetts 1937–49, delegate to the Republican National Convention 1952 1956 1960. Son of Oliver B. Clason.

== The Clausens ==
- Sally Clausen (born 1945), Louisiana commissioner of higher education 1988–90, 2008–10; president of Southeastern Louisiana University 1995–2001
  - Thomas G. Clausen (1939–2002), Louisiana superintendent of education 1984–88, brother of Sally Clausen

== The Claussens and Giffords ==
- Charles L. Gifford (1871–1947), Massachusetts State Representative 1912–13, Massachusetts State Senator 1914–19, delegate to the Republican National Convention 1816, U.S. Representative from Massachusetts 1922–47. Father of Florence G. Claussen.
  - Florence G. Claussen, Massachusetts Republican Committeewoman 1949. Daughter of Charles L. Gifford.

== The Clays ==
- Matthew Clay (1754–1815), Virginia House Delegate 1790–94, U.S. Representative from Virginia 1797–1813 1815. Brother of Green Clay.
- Green Clay (1757–1826), member of the Virginia Legislature 1788–89, member of the Kentucky Legislature 1793–94, Kentucky State Senator 1795–98 1807, delegate to the Kentucky Constitutional Convention 1799. Brother of Matthew Clay.
  - Matthew Clay (1795–1827), Alabama State Representative 1820–22, Alabama State Senator 1825–27. Son of Matthew Clay.
  - Brutus Clay (1808–1878), Kentucky State Representative 1840, U.S. Representative from Kentucky 1863–65. Son of Green Clay.
  - Cassius M. Clay (1810–1903), Kentucky State Representative 1835–37 1840, candidate for Republican nomination for Vice President of the United States 1860, U.S. Minister to Russia 1861–62 1863–69. Son of Green Clay.
  - Henry Clay (1777–1852), U.S. Representative from Kentucky 1811–14 1815–21 1823–25, candidate for President of the United States 1824 1832 1844, U.S. Secretary of States 1825–29, U.S. Senator from Kentucky 1831–42 1849–52. First cousin once removed of Matthew Clay and Green Clay.
  - Porter Clay (1779–1850), Kentucky Auditor of Public Accounts. First cousin once removed of Matthew Clay and Green Clay.
    - Thomas Hart Clay (1803–1871), U.S. Minister to Nicaragua 1863, U.S. Minister to Honduras 1863. Son of Henry Clay.
    - Henry Clay Jr. (1811–1847), Kentucky State Representative 1835–37. Son of Henry Clay.
    - James B. Clay (1817–1864), Chargé d'affaires to Portugal 1849–50, U.S. Representative from Kentucky 1847–49, member of the Peace Conference of 1861. Son of Henry Clay.
    - Brutus J. Clay (1847–1932), delegate to the Republican National Convention 1904, U.S. Minister to Switzerland 1905–10. Son of Cassius M. Clay.
    - W. Cassius Goodloe (1841–1889), Republican National Committeeman, U.S. Minister to Belgium 1878–80. Nephew of Cassius M. Clay.
    - Clement C. Clay (1789–1866), Alabama Territory Councilman 1817–18, Alabama State Court Judge 1819–23, Alabama State Representative 1827–28, U.S. Representative from Alabama 1829–35, Governor of Alabama 1835–37, U.S. Senator from Alabama 1837–41, Justice of the Alabama Supreme Court 1843. Third cousin once removed of Thomas H. Clay, James B. Clay, and Brutus J. Clay.
      - Henry Clay (1849–1884), candidate for Kentucky State Representative 1883.Grandson of Henry Clay.
      - Clement Claiborne Clay Jr. (1816–1882), Alabama State Representative 1842 1844 1845, Judge of the Madison County, Alabama 1846–48; U.S. Senator from Alabama 1853–61; Confederate States Senator 1861–63. Son of Clement C. Clay.

NOTE: Matthew Clay was also second cousin by marriage of U.S. Representative Robert Williams, U.S. Representative Marmaduke Williams, U.S. Representative Archibald Henderson, and North Carolina Supreme Court Justice Leonard Henderson. Clay was also cousin by marriage of U.S. Senator John Williams and U.S. Representative Lewis Williams and granduncle of U.S. Senator Thomas Clay McCreery. James B. Clay was also related by marriage to U.S. Senator John Breckinridge, U.S. Senator Thomas Hart Benton, and U.S. Senator William Grayson.

== The Clays of Missouri ==
- William L. Clay (born 1931), St. Louis, Missouri Alderman 1959–64; U.S. Representative from Missouri 1969–2001. Father of William Lacy Clay Jr.
  - William Lacy Clay Jr. (born 1956), U.S. Representative from Missouri 2001–2021. Son of William L. Clay.

== The Clays, Cummings, and Stiles ==
- Joseph Clay (1741–1804), Delegate to the Continental Congress from Georgia 1778, Treasurer of Georgia 1782, U.S. District Court Judge in Georgia 1786–91. Father of Joseph Clay Jr., grandfather of William H. Stiles, Alfred Cumming, and Henry Harford Cumming.
  - Joseph Clay Jr. (1764–1811), the second United States federal judge to be appointed to a federal court in the state of Georgia, son of Joseph Clay.
  - Thomas Cumming, Mayor of Augusta, Georgia. Son-in-law of Joseph Clay, father of Alfred Cumming and Henry Harford Cumming.
    - Alfred Cumming (1802–1873), Mayor of Augusta, Georgia 1836; Governor of Utah Territory 1858–61. Son of Thomas Cumming.
    - Henry Harford Cumming (1799–1866), an important figure in antebellum Augusta, Georgia.
    - William H. Stiles (1808–1865), Solicitor General in Georgia 1833–36, U.S. Representative from Georgia 1843–45, U.S. Chargé d'affaires to Austria 1845–49, Georgia State Representative, delegate to the Democratic National Convention 1860. Grandson of Joseph Clay.

NOTE: Alfred Cumming was also great-grandson-in-law of Continental Congressional Delegate Samuel Adams.

== The Claypools and Petersons ==
- John B. Peterson (1850–1944), prosecuting attorney in Indiana 1880–84, U.S. Representative from Indiana 1913–15. Cousin of Horatio C. Claypool.
- Horatio C. Claypool (1859–1921), prosecuting attorney of Ross County, Ohio 1899–1903; Probate Judge of Ross County, Ohio 1905–10; U.S. Representative from Ohio 1911–15 1917–19. Cousin of John B. Peterson.
  - Harold K. Claypool (1886–1958), U.S. Representative from Ohio 1937–43. Son of Horatio C. Claypool.

== The Claytons and Garwoods ==
- William L. Clayton (1880–1966), Under Secretary of State for Economic Affairs 1946–47.
  - William Lockhart Garwood (1931–2011), Judge of the United States Court of Appeals for the Fifth Circuit 1981–97. Grandson of William L. Clayton.

== The Claytons of Alabama ==
- Henry DeLamar Clayton (1827–1889), Alabama Circuit Court Judge. Father of Henry De Lamar Clayton Jr. and Bertram Tracy Clayton.
  - Henry De Lamar Clayton Jr. (1857–1929), Alabama State Representative 1890–91, U.S. Attorney in Alabama 1893–96, U.S. Representative from Alabama 1897–1914, Chairman of the Democratic National Convention 1908, delegate to the Democratic National Convention 1912. Son of Henry DeLamar Clayton.
  - Bertram Tracy Clayton (1862–1918), U.S. Representative from New York 1899–1901. Son of Henry DeLamar Clayton.

== The Claytons of Delaware ==
- Joshua Clayton (1744–1798) State court judge, Delaware; Governor, Delaware, 1789–96; U.S. Senator, Delaware, 1798; died in office 1798.
  - Thomas Clayton (1777–1854) Member, Delaware state house of representatives, 1802–06, 1810, 1812–13; member, Delaware state senate, 1808, 1821; secretary of state, Delaware, 1808–10; Delaware state attorney general, 1810–15; U.S. Representative, Delaware at-large, 1815–17; U.S. Senator, Delaware, 1824–27, 1837–47; judge, common pleas court, Delaware, 1828; superior court judge, Delaware, 1832. Son of Joshua.
  - John M. Clayton (1796–1856) Member, Delaware state house of representatives, 1824; secretary of state, Delaware, 1826; U.S. Senator, Delaware, 1829–36, 1845–49, 1853–56; died in office 1856; justice, Delaware state supreme court, 1837; U.S. Secretary of State, 1849–50. Nephew of Joshua.
    - C. Douglass Buck (1890–1965) Governor, Delaware, 1929–37; member, Republican National Committee, Delaware, 1932; delegate, Republican National Convention, Delaware, 1936, 1940, 1944, 1948; U.S. Senator, Delaware, 1943–49; defeated, 1948. Great-grandnephew of John.

== The Clements ==
- Robert Clement, Mayor of Dickson, Tennessee. Father of Frank G. Clement and Anna Belle Clement O'Brien.
  - Frank G. Clement (1920–1969), Governor of Tennessee 1953–59 1963–67, candidate for U.S. Senate from Tennessee 1966. Son of Robert Clement.
  - Anna Belle Clement O'Brien (1923–2009), Tennessee Assemblywoman 1975–77, Tennessee State Senator 1977–91, candidate for Democratic nomination for Governor of Tennessee 1982. Daughter of Robert Clement.
  - Charles H. O'Brien (1920–2007), Tennessee State Representative, Judge of the Tennessee Court of Criminal Appeals 1970–87, Justice of the Tennessee Supreme Court 1987–94. Husband of Anna Belle Clement O'Brien.
    - Robert N. Clement (born 1943), candidate for Democratic nomination for Governor of Tennessee 1978, candidate for U.S. Representative from Tennessee 1982, U.S. Representative from Tennessee 1988–2003, delegate to the Democratic National Convention 2000, candidate for U.S. Senate from Tennessee 2002. Son of Frank G. Clement.
    - Frank G. Clement Jr., Probate Court Judge in Tennessee, Judge of the Tennessee Court of Appeals. Son of Frank G. Clement.

== The Clements of Georgia ==
- Adam Clements (1804–1886), Georgia State Representative 1853–54 1861–62. Father of Judson C. Clements.
  - Judson C. Clements (1846–1917), Georgia State Representative 1872–76, Georgia State Senator 1877, U.S. Representative from Georgia 1881–91, member of the Interstate Commerce Commission 1892–1917. Son of Adam Clements.

== The Clevelands ==
- Grover Cleveland (1837–1908), Sheriff of Erie County, New York 1870–73; Mayor of Buffalo, New York 1882; Governor of New York 1882–85; President of the United States 1885–89 1893–97. Father of Richard F. Cleveland.
  - Richard F. Cleveland (1898–1974), delegate to the Maryland Constitutional Convention 1967. Son of Grover Cleveland.

== The Cliffords ==
- John H. Clifford (1809–1876), Massachusetts State Representative 1835, Attorney General of Massachusetts 1849–53 1854–58, Governor of Massachusetts 1853–54, Massachusetts State Senator 1862. Father of Walter Clifford.
  - Walter Clifford, Mayor of New Bedford, Massachusetts 1889–90. Son of John H. Clifford.

== The Cliffords of Maine ==
- Nathan Clifford (1803–1881), Maine State Representative 1830, Attorney General of Maine 1834–37, U.S. Representative 1839–43, Attorney General of the United States 1846–48, U.S. Minister to Mexico 1848–49, Justice of the U.S. Supreme Court 1858–81. Grandfather of Nathan Clifford.
  - Nathan Clifford, delegate to the Democratic National Convention 1904, Mayor of Portland, Maine 1906–07. Grandson of Nathan Clifford.

== The Cliffords, Delahantys, and Smiths ==
- John M. C. Smith (1853–1923), U.S. Representative from Michigan 1911–21 1921–23.
  - John David Clifford Jr. (1887–1956), Judge of the United States District Court for the District of Maine 1947–56. Son-in-law of John M. C. Smith.
    - Robert W. Clifford (born 1937), Justice of the Maine Supreme Judicial Court 1986–2009. Nephew of John David Clifford Jr.
    - Thomas E. Delahanty (1914–1985), Justice of the Maine Supreme Judicial Court 1973–85. Son-in-law of John David Clifford Jr.
      - Thomas E. Delahanty II (1945–2021), United States Attorney for the District of Maine 1980–81 2010–17, Justice of the Maine Supreme Judicial Court 1983–2010. Son of Thomas E. Delahanty.

== The Clintons of New York ==
- Charles Clinton, legislator in colonial New York
  - George Clinton, son of Charles, delegate to Continental Congress, army brigadier general, first Governor of New York (for 21 years, still the US record), Vice President under Thomas Jefferson and James Madison.
    - Matthias B. Tallmadge (1774–1819), Judge of the United States District Court for the District of New York 1805–14, Judge of the United States District Court for the Northern District of New York 1814–19. Son-in-law of George Clinton.
  - James Clinton, son of Charles, Revolutionary War general
    - DeWitt Clinton, legislator in New York, US Senator from New York, Mayor of New York City, candidate for US President, twice Governor of New York, responsible for Erie Canal. Son of James Clinton.
    - George Clinton, Jr. (1771–1809), New York Assemblyman 1803–05, U.S. Representative from New York 1805–09. Son of James Clinton.
    - James Graham Clinton (1804–1849), Master in Chancery of Orange County, New York; Judge of the Orange County, New York Court of Common Pleas; U.S. Representative from New York 1841–45. Son of James Clinton.

DeWitt Clinton was also brother-in-law of U.S. Representative Ambrose Spencer. Matthias B. Tallmadge was also brother of U.S. Representative and Lieutenant Governor James Tallmadge Jr.

== The Clintons, Rodhams, Lockharts, Boxers and Mezvinskys ==
- Bill Clinton (born 1946), 42nd President of the United States, 1993–2001, Governor of Arkansas, 1979–81, 1983–92, Attorney General of Arkansas, 1976–78, failed Congressional candidate, 1974; husband of Hillary Rodham Clinton.
- Hillary Clinton (born 1947), United States Secretary of State, 2009–13; former United States Senator from New York, 2001–09; First Lady of the United States, 1993–2001; First Lady of Arkansas, 1979–81, 1983–92; Chair, Legal Services Corporation, 1978–82; Legal Counsel, House Judiciary Committee, 1974; Democratic candidate for U.S. President, 2008; 2016, wife of Bill Clinton.
- Hugh Rodham (brother of Hillary), Democratic candidate for U.S. Senator from Florida, 1994.

Note: Bill Clinton (born William Blythe) is not related to the Clinton family of New York. He is, however, third cousin twice removed of Congressman James A. Lockhart. Hillary Rodham Clinton and Hugh Rodham's brother, Anthony, is also former son-in-law of U.S. Senator Barbara Boxer. William and Hillary's daughter, Chelsea, is also daughter-in-law of U.S. Representatives Edward Mezvinsky and Marjorie Margolies-Mezvinsky.

== The Cliffords ==
- Nathan Clifford (1803–1881), Maine State Representative 1830–34, Maine Attorney General 1834–38, U.S. Representative from Maine 1839–43, U.S. Attorney General 1846–48, U.S. Minister to Mexico 1848–49, Justice of the U.S. Supreme Court 1858–81, President of the Electoral Commission 1877. Father of William Henry Clifford.
  - William Henry Clifford, candidate for U.S. House of Representative from Maine, member of the National Democratic Committee from Maine. Son of Nathan Clifford.
    - Nathan Clifford, delegate to the Democratic National Convention 1904, Mayor of Portland, Maine 1906–07. Son of William Henry Clifford.

== The Clippingers ==
- Henry C. Clippinger (1853–1926), Mayor of Delaware, Ohio 1902–06. Third cousin of Charles H. Clippinger.
- Charles H. Clippinger (1879–1937), Chairman of the Franklin County, Pennsylvania Republican Party 1927; Pennsylvania State Senator 1931–32. Third cousin of Henry C. Clppinger.
  - Roy Clippinger (1886–1962), U.S. Representative from Illinois 1945–49. Third cousin once removed of Henry C. Clippinger and Charles H. Clippinger.

== The Cloughs and Hartleys ==
- David Marston Clough (1846–1924), Minnesota State Senator 1887–91, Lieutenant Governor of Minnesota 1893–95, Governor of Minnesota 1895–99. Father-in-law of Roland H. Hartley.
  - Roland H. Hartley (1864–1952), Mayor of Everett, Washington 1910–12; Washington State Representative 1915–16; Governor of Washington 1925–33. Son-in-law of David Marston Clough.

== The Clyburns and Murrays ==
- George W. Murray (1853–1926), Inspector of Customs of the Port of Charleston, South Carolina 1890–92; U.S. Representative from South Carolina 1893–95 1896–97. Relative of James E. Clyburn.
- James E. Clyburn (born 1940), U.S. Representative from South Carolina 1993–present. Relative of George Washington Murray.

== The Cobbs ==
- Howell Cobb (1772–1818), U.S. Representative from Georgia 1807–12. Great uncle of Howell Cobb.
  - Howell Cobb (1815–1868), U.S. Representative from Georgia 1843–51 1855–57, Governor of Georgia 1851–53, U.S. Secretary of the Treasury 1857–60, Speaker of the Provisional Confederate Congress 1861–62. Great nephew of Howell Cobb.
  - Thomas R.R. Cobb (1823–1862), member of the Provisional Confederate Congress from Georgia 1861. Brother of Howell Cobb.
  - Thomas W. Cobb (1784–1830), U.S. Representative from Georgia 1817–21 1823–24, U.S. Senator from Georgia 1824–28. Cousin of Howell Cobb and Thomas R.R. Cobb.
    - Henry R. Jackson (1820–1898), U.S. Minister to Mexico 1885–86. Son-in-law of Thomas R.R. Cobb.
    - M. Hoke Smith (1855–1931), President of multiple Georgia State Democratic Conventions, U.S. Secretary of the Interior 1893–96, Governor of Georgia 1907–09 1911, U.S. Senator from Georgia 1911–21. Son-in-law of Thomas R.R. Cobb.
      - Andrew C. Erwin (1884–1941), Mayor of Athens, Georgia 1918–21; delegate to the Democratic National Convention 1920 1924 1928 1932. Grandson of Howell Cobb.

NOTE: Thomas R.R. Cobb was also the son-in-law of Georgia Supreme Court Chief Justice Joseph Henry Lumpkin. Andrew C. Erwin was also brother-in-law of Athens, Georgia Mayor Robert L. McWhorter.

== The Coburns ==
- Abner Coburn (1803–1885), Governor of Maine 1863–64. Brother of Stephen Coburn.
- Stephen Coburn (1817–1882), U.S. Representative from Maine 1861. Brother of Stephen Coburn.

== The Cochrans and Dobbins ==
- James Cochran (c. 1767–1813), member of the North Carolina House of Representatives 1802 to 1806, member of the North Carolina Senate 1807, congressman from North Carolina 1809 to 1813.
  - James C. Dobbin (1814–1857), congressman from North Carolina 1845 to 1847, member of the North Carolina House of Representatives 1848; 1850; 1852, Speaker of the North Carolina House of Representatives 1850, United States Secretary of the Navy 1853 to 1857.

== The Cochranes and Van Schaicks ==
- Isaac W. Van Schaick (1817–1901), Milwaukee, Wisconsin Common Councilman 1871; Wisconsin Assemblyman 1873–75; Wisconsin State Senator 1877–82; U.S. Representative from Wisconsin 1885–87 1889–91; candidate for Wisconsin State Senate 1890. Uncle of Aaron V.S. Cochrane.
  - Aaron V.S. Cochrane (1858–1943), Judge of Hudson, New York 1887–88; District Attorney of Columbia County, New York 1889–92; U.S. Representative from New York 1897–1901; Justice of the New York Supreme Court 1902–28. Nephew of Isaac W. Van Schaick.

== The Cocks and Hicks ==
- William W. Cocks (1861–1932), Commissioner of Highways of North Hempstead, New York 1894–1900; New York State Senator 1901–02; New York Assemblyman 1904; delegate to the Republican National Convention 1908; U.S. Representative from New York 1905–11. Brother of Frederick C. Hicks.
- Frederick C. Hicks (1872–1925), candidate for U.S. Representative from New York 1912, U.S. Representative from New York 1915–23. Brother of William W. Cocks.

== The Cockes ==
- William Cocke (1747–1828), member of the Virginia House of Burgesses 1774, delegate to the Tennessee Constitutional Convention 1796, U.S. Senator from Tennessee 1796–97 1797 1799–1805, Circuit Court Judge in Tennessee 1809–12. Father of John Alexander Cocke.
  - John Alexander Cocke (1772–1854), Tennessee State Representative 1796–97 1807–09 1812 1837, Tennessee State Senator 1799–1801 1843, U.S. Representative from Tennessee 1819–27. Son of William Cocke.
    - Frederick Bird Smith Cocke (1813–1903), Texas State Representative 1861–63 1879, delegate to the Texas Constitutional Convention 1875. Son of John Alexander Cocke.
      - Frederick Bird Smith Cocke Jr. (1839–1912), Texas State Representative 1899. Son of Frederick Bird Smith Cocke.
    - William Michael Cocke (1815–1896), member of the Tennessee Legislature, U.S. Representative from Tennessee 1845–49. Grandson of William Cocke.
      - William Alexander Cocke (1874–1954), Texas State Representative 1906. Grandson of Frederick Bird Smith Cocke.
- John Hartwell Cocke (1780–1866), Brigadier General in the Virginia militia during the War of 1812; served on the board of visitors at the University of Virginia from 1819 until 1852.
  - Philip St. George Cocke (1809–1861), President of the Virginia State Agricultural Society from 1853 until 1856, Brigadier General in the Confederate Army. Son of John Hartwell Cocke.

== The Cockrans and Ides ==
- Henry Clay Ide (1844–1921), Vermont State Senator 1882, Governor-General of the Philippines 1906–07, U.S. Minister to Spain 1909–13. Father-in-law of W. Bourke Cockran.
  - W. Bourke Cockran (1854–1923), U.S. Representative from New York 1887–89 1891–95 1904–09 1921–23, delegate to the Democratic National Convention 1904 1920, candidate for U.S. Representative from New York 1912. Son-in-law of Henry Clay Ide.

== The Coddingtons ==
- William Coddington (1601–1678), Judge of Newport, Rhode Island 1630–40; Judge of Portsmouth, Rhode Island 1638–39; Governor of Newport and Portsmouth 1640–47 1651–53; Governor of Rhode Island Colony 1674–76 1678. Father of William Coddington Jr.
  - William Coddington Jr., Governor of Rhode Island Colony 1683–85. Son of William Coddington.

== The Coffmans ==
- Mike Coffman (born 1955), Colorado State Representative 1989–94, Colorado State Senator 1994–99, Treasurer of Colorado 1999–2005 2006–07, Secretary of State of Colorado 2007–09, U.S. Representative from Colorado 2009–19, Mayor of Aurora, Colorado 2019–present.
- Cynthia Coffman (born 1962), Chief Deputy Attorney General of Colorado 2005–15, Attorney General of Colorado 2015–19. Former wife of Mike Coffman.

== The Coggs ==
- Isaac N. Coggs (1920–1973), Member of Wisconsin State Assembly, 1953–64; Milwaukee County Board, 1964.
- Marcia P. Coggs (1928–2003), Member of Wisconsin State Assembly, 1977–93. Wife of Isaac Coggs.
- Spencer Coggs (born 1949), Member of Wisconsin State Assembly, 1982–2002; Wisconsin State Senate, 2003–present; Delegate to Democratic National Convention, 2004; Candidate for Lieutenant Governor of Wisconsin, 2010. Great-nephew of Isaac and Marcia Coggs.
  - Elizabeth M. Coggs Member of Milwaukee County Board, 1988–2010. Daughter of Isaac and Marcia Coggs
  - Leon Young, Member of Wisconsin State Assembly, 1993–2019. Nephew of Isaac and Marcia Coggs.
  - Milele Coggs, Member of Milwaukee's Common Council, 2008–present. Niece of Spencer Coggs, cousin of Elizabeth Coggs-Jones

== The Cohens of Philadelphia ==
- David Cohen (1914–2005) was a member of the Philadelphia City Council from 1968 to 1971, and from 1980 until his death in 2005. He was a delegate to the 1968 Democratic National Convention.
- Florence Cohen (b. 1917) was a delegate to the 1996 Democratic National Convention. She was the wife of David Cohen.
- Mark B. Cohen (born 1949) has been a member of the Pennsylvania House of Representatives since June 10, 1974. He is currently the most senior member of the Pennsylvania General Assembly. He was elected a delegate to the 2004 Democratic National Convention, the 2008 Democratic National Convention, and the 2012 Democratic National Convention. He is a son of David Cohen.
- Denis P. Cohen (b. 1952) was appointed by Governor Thomas Ridge as a Judge of the Philadelphia Court of Common Pleas in 2000. He was elected to the Court of Common Pleas in 2001 and re-elected in 2011. He is a son of David Cohen.

== The Cokes ==
- Richard Coke Jr. (1790–1851), U.S. Representative from Virginia 1829–33. Uncle of Richard Coke.
  - Richard Coke (1829–1897), Texas State Court Judge 1865, Justice of the Texas Supreme Court 1866, Governor of Texas 1874–76, U.S. Senator from Texas 1877–95. Nephew of Richard Coke Jr.

== The Colbys ==
- John P. Colby (1811–1894), New Hampshire State Representative 1863–64. Second cousin once removed of Frederick M. Colby.
  - Frederick M. Colby (1848–1920), candidate for U.S. Representative from New Hampshire 1908. Second cousin once removed of John P. Colby.
    - Bainbridge Colby (1869–1950), New York Assemblyman 1901–02, candidate for U.S. Senate from New York 1914 1916, delegate to the Democratic National Convention 1920 1924, U.S. Secretary of State 1920–21. Third cousin twice removed of John P. Colby.

== The Coles of Ohio ==
- Raymond C. Cole (1870–1957), Solicitor of Findlay, Ohio 1912–16; U.S. Representative from Ohio 1919–25. Brother of Ralph D. Cole
- Ralph D. Cole (1873–1932), Ohio State Representative 1900–04, U.S. Representative from Ohio 1905–11, delegate to the Republican National Convention 1916 1920 1924. Brother of Raymond C. Cole.

== The Coles of Virginia ==
- Isaac Coles (1747–1813), Virginia House Delegate 1780–81 1783–88, U.S. Representative from Virginia 1789–91 1793–97. Father of Walter Coles.
  - Walter Coles (1790–1857), Virginia House Delegate 1817–18 1833–34, U.S. Representative from Virginia 1835–45. Son of Isaac Coles.

== The Coles, Rutherfoords, and Stevensons ==
- Edward Coles (1786–1868), Governor of Illinois 1822–26. Brother-in-law of John Rutherfoord and Andrew Stevenson.
- John Rutherfoord (1792–1866), Governor of Virginia 1841–42. Brother-in-law of Edward Coles.
- Andrew Stevenson (1784–1857), Indiana State Representative 1831–32 1844–45, Indiana State Senator 1839–42, U.S. Representative from Virginia 1821–34, Speaker of the U.S. House of Representatives 1827–34, U.S. Minister to Great Britain 1836–41. Brother-in-law of Edward Coles.
  - John White Stevenson (1812–1886), Kentucky State Representative 1845–48, delegate to the Democratic National Convention 1848 1852 1856 1880, delegate to the Kentucky Constitutional Convention 1849, U.S. Representative from Kentucky 1857–61, Lieutenant Governor of Kentucky 1867, Governor of Kentucky 1867–71, U.S. Senator from Kentucky 1871–77. Son of Andrew Stevenson.

NOTE: Andrew Stevenson was also grandson-in-law of Continental Congressional Delegate Carter Braxton.

== The Colemans ==
- Peter Tali Coleman (1919–1997), Attorney General of American Samoa 1955–1956, Governor of American Samoa 1956–1961 1978–1985 1989–1993. Father of Amata Coleman Radewagen.
  - Amata Coleman Radewagen (born 1947), Republican National Committeewoman 1986–present, U.S. House Delegate from American Samoa 2015–present. Daughter of Peter Tali Coleman.

NOTE: Peter Tali Coleman was also the High Commissioner of the Trust Territory of the Pacific Islands from 1976 to 1977.

== The Colemans of Kentucky ==
- Jack Coleman (born 1953), Commissioner of Harrodsburg, Kentucky, member of the Burgin, Kentucky School Board, Vice Chair of the Burgin, Kentucky School Board; Kentucky Commonwealth Representative. Father of Jacqueline Coleman.
  - Jacqueline Coleman (born 1982), candidate for Kentucky Commonwealth Representative 2014, Lieutenant Governor of Kentucky 2019–present, Kentucky Secretary of Education and Workforce Development 2019–present. Daughter of Jack Coleman.

== The Colemans of Minnesota ==
- Nicholas D. Coleman (1925–1981), Minnesota State Senator 1963–81, delegate to the Democratic National Convention 1964. Father of Christopher B. Coleman.
  - Christopher B. Coleman (born 1961), Mayor of Saint Paul, Minnesota 2006–present. Son of Nicholas D. Coleman.

== The Colemans of Mississippi ==
- James P. Coleman (1914–1991), Judge of the Mississippi Circuit Court for the Fifth Judicial District 1947–50, Justice of the Mississippi Supreme Court 1950, Attorney General of Mississippi 1952–56, Governor of Mississippi 1956–60, Mississippi State Representative 1960–65, Judge of the United States Court of Appeals for the Fifth Circuit 1965–81.
  - Thomas Coleman, judge of the Mississippi Court of Appeals. Father of Josiah D. Coleman.
    - Josiah D. Coleman (born 1972), Associate Justice of the Supreme Court of Mississippi 2013–present. Grandson of James P. Coleman.

== The Colfaxes, Holmeses, and Wades ==
- Benjamin Wade (1800–1878), U.S. Senator from Ohio 1851–69. Brother of Edward Wade.
- Edward Wade (1802–1866), Justice of the Peace in Ashtabula County, Ohio 1831; prosecuting attorney of Ashtabula County, Ohio 1833; U.S. Representative from Ohio 1853–61. Brother of Benjamin Wade.
  - Schuyler Colfax (1823–1885), U.S. Representative from Indiana 1855–69, Vice President of the United States 1869–73. Son-in-law of Benjamin Wade.
    - Schuyler Colfax III (1870–1925), Mayor of South Bend, Indiana 1898–1902. Son of Schuyler Colfax.
    - Oliver W. Holmes (1841–1935), Justice of the U.S. Supreme Court 1902–32. Fourth cousin twice removed of Benjamin Wade.

== The Collinses ==
- George W. Collins (1925–1972), U.S. Representative from Illinois, 1970–72.
- Cardiss Collins (1931–2013), U.S. Representative from Illinois, 1973–97. Wife of George W. Collins.

== The Collinses of Georgia ==
- Mac Collins (1944-2018), Chair of the Butts County, Georgia Commission, 1977-1981; member of the Georgia State Senate, 1989-1993; U.S. Representative from Georgia, 1993-2005.
  - Mike Collins (born 1967), candidate for the U.S. House of Representatives, 2014; U.S. Representative from Georgia, 2023-present. Son of Mac Collins.

== The Collins and Hardmans ==
- Lamartine Griffin Hardman (1856–1937), Georgia State Representative 1902–07, Georgia State Senator 1908–10, Governor of Georgia 1927–31. Father-in-law of Linton McGee Collins.
  - Linton McGee Collins, Judge of U.S. Court of Claims 1964–71. Son-in-law of Lamartine Griffin Hardman.

== The Colons and Mayorals ==
- Rafael Hernández Colón (born 1936), Puerto Rico Commonwealth Senator 1969–72, Governor of Puerto Rico 1973–77 1985–93, candidate for Governor of Puerto Rico 1980. Father of Juan Hernandez Mayoral.
  - Juan Hernández Mayoral, Puerto Rico Territory Senator, candidate for the Democratic nomination for Resident Commissioner of Puerto Rico to the U.S. House of Representatives 2000, delegate to the Democratic National Convention 2004. Son of Rafael Hernández Colón.
  - Juan Eugenio Hernandez Mayoral, Puerto Rico Commonwealth Senator. Son of Rafael Hernandez Colon.

== The Colquitts and Lanes ==
- Walter T. Colquitt (1799–1855), Georgia State Senator 1834 1837, U.S. Representative from Georgia 1839–40 1842–43, U.S. Senator from George 1843–48. First cousin by marriage of Joseph Lane.
- Joseph Lane (1801–1881), Indiana State Representative, Indiana State Senator, Governor of Oregon Territory 1848–50, U.S. Congressional Delegate from Oregon Territory 1851–59, acting governor of Oregon Territory 1853, U.S. Senator from Oregon 1859–61, candidate for Vice President of the United States 1860. First cousin by marriage of Walter T. Colquitt.
  - Alfred H. Colquitt (1824–1894), U.S. Representative from Georgia 1853–55, Governor of Georgia 1877–82, U.S. Senator from Georgia 1883–94. Son of Walter T. Colquitt.
  - La Fayette Lane (1842–1896), Oregon State Representative 1864, U.S. Representative from Oregon 1875–77. Son of Joseph Lane.
    - Harry Lane (1855–1917), Mayor of Portland, Oregon 1905–09; U.S. Senator from Oregon 1913–17. Grandson of Joseph Lane.

== The Colts ==
- LeBaron Bradford Colt (1846–1924), Rhode Island State Representative 1879–81, Judge of the United States District Court for the District of Rhode Island 1881–84, Judge of the United States Circuit Courts for the First Circuit 1884–1911, Judge of the United States Court of Appeals for the First Circuit 1891–1913, U.S. Senator from Rhode Island 1913–24.
- Samuel P. Colt (1852–1921), Attorney General of Rhode Island 1882–86. Brother of LeBaron Bradford Colt.

== The Colvins ==
- Harvey Doolittle Colvin (1815–1892), Mayor of Chicago 1873–76. Father of John H. Colvin.
  - John H. Colvin, Chicago, Illinois Alderman 1882–88; delegate to the Democratic National Convention 1904. Son of Harvey Doolittle Colvin.

== The Combses ==
- Bert Combs (1911–1991), Governor of Kentucky 1959–63, Judge of the United States Court of Appeals for the Sixth Circuit 1967–70.
- Sara Walter Combs (born 1948), Associate Justice of the Kentucky Supreme Court 1993, Associate Judge of the Kentucky Court of Appeals 1994–present. Wife of Bert Combs.
  - Lois Combs Weinberg (born 1943), candidate for U.S. Senator 2002. Daughter of Bert Combs.

== The Comegys and Ridgelys ==
- Cornelius P. Comegys (1780–1851), Delaware Assemblyman 1811–15 1830, Governor of Delaware 1837–41. Father of Joseph P. Comegys.
  - Joseph P. Comegys (1813–1893), Delaware State Representative 1843–44 1849–50, U.S. Senator from Delaware 1856–57, Chief Justice of the Delaware Supreme Court 1876–93. Son of Cornelius P. Comegys.
  - Henry M. Ridgely (1779–1847), Delaware State Representative 1808–10, U.S. Representative from Delaware 1811–15, Delaware Secretary of State 1817–27, Delaware State Senator 1816 1822 1827, U.S. Senator from Delaware 1827–29. Son-in-law of Cornelius P. Comegys.

== The Comers, Blounts, and Lathrops ==
- Braxton B. Comer (1948–1927), Governor of Alabama 1907–11, U.S. Senator from Alabama 1920. Father-in-law of Frank H. Lathrop.
  - Frank H. Lathrop, delegate to the Republican National Convention 1908 1920, candidate for U.S. Senate from Alabama 1924, candidate for U.S. Representative from Alabama 1926. Son-in-law of Braxton B. Comer.
  - James H. Blount Jr. (1869–1918), U.S. District Court Judge in the Philippines 1901–05. Former son-in-law of Braxton B. Comer.

NOTE: James H. Blount Jr. was also son of U.S. Representative James H. Blount.

== The Comptons and Keys ==
- Philip Key (1750–1820), Maryland House Delegate 1773 1779–90 1795–96, U.S. Representative from Maryland 1791–93. Cousin of Philip Barton Key.
- Philip Barton Key (1757–1815), Maryland House Delegate 1794–99, Mayor of Annapolis, Maryland 1797–98; U.S. Representative from Maryland 1807–13. Cousin of Philip Key.
  - Francis Scott Key (1779–1843), U.S. District Attorney of District of Columbia 1833–41. Nephew of Philip Barton Key.
  - Joseph Hopper Nicholson (1770–1817), Maryland House Delegate 1796–98, U.S. Representative from Maryland 1799–1806, Judge of the Maryland Court of Appeals 1806–17. Brother-in-law of Francis Scott Key.
  - Roger B. Taney (1777–1864), Maryland House Delegate 1799, Maryland State Senator 1816–20, Attorney General of Maryland 1827–31, Attorney General of the United States 1831–33, U.S. Secretary of the Treasury 1833–34, Chief Justice of the U.S. Supreme Court 1836–64. Brother-in-law of Francis Scott Key.
    - Philip Barton Key II (1818–1859), U.S. District Attorney of District of Columbia 1853–59. Son of Francis Scott Key.
    - George H. Pendleton (1825–1889), Ohio State Senator 1854, U.S. Representative from Ohio 1857–65, delegate to the Democratic National Convention 1864, candidate for Vice President of the United States 1864, candidate for Democratic nomination for President of the United States 1868, candidate for Governor of Ohio 1869, U.S. Senator from Ohio 1879–85, U.S. Minister to Germany 1885–89. Son-in-law of Francis Scott Key.
      - Barnes Compton (1830–1898), Maryland House Delegate 1860–61, Maryland State Senator 1867–68 1870 1872, Treasurer of Maryland 1874–85, U.S. Representative from Maryland 1885–89 1891–94. Great-grandson of Philip Key.

NOTE: George Hunt Pendleton was also son of U.S. Representative Nathanael Greene Pendleton.

== The Comstocks and Russells ==
- Charles C. Comstock (1818–1900), Mayor of Grand Rapids, Michigan 1963–65; candidate for Governor of Michigan 1870; candidate for U.S. Representative from Michigan 1873; U.S. Representative from Michigan 1883–85. Father-in-law of Huntley Russell.
  - Huntley Russell, Michigan State Senator 1905–08. Son-in-law of Charles C. Comstock.

== The Conaways of Baltimore ==
- Frank M. Conaway Sr. (1933-2015), Delegate in the Maryland General Assembly 1971–75 and 1979-83; Clerk of Courts for Baltimore City 1999–2015
- Mary W. Conaway Register of Wills for Baltimore City 1982–2012
- Frank M. Conaway Jr. (1963), Maryland General Assembly Delegate from the 40th district 2007
- Belinda K. Conaway, Member of Baltimore City Council representing 7th district 2004–11, Candidate for Baltimore Register of Wills in 2014.

== The Condicts and Cutlers ==
- Silas Condict (1738–1801), Delegate to the Continental Congress from New Jersey 1781–83, New Jersey Assemblyman. Uncle of Lewis Condict.
  - Lewis Condict (1772–1862), Sheriff of Morris County, New Jersey 1801–03; New Jersey Assemblyman 1805–09 1837–38; U.S. Representative from New Jersey 1811–17 1821–33. Nephew of Silas Condict.
    - Augustus W. Cutler (1827–1897), Prosecutor of Pleas of Morris County, New Jersey 1856–61; New Jersey State Senator 1871–74; delegate to the New Jersey Constitutional Convention 1873; U.S. Representative from New Jersey 1875–79; candidate for U.S. Representative from New Jersey 1880 1896. Great-grandson of Silas Condict.

== The Condits ==
- John Condit (1755–1834), New Jersey Assemblyman 1788–89, U.S. Representative from New Jersey 1799–1803 1819, U.S. Senator from New Jersey 1803–09 1809–17, Collector of the Port of New York City 1819–30. Father of Silas Condit.
  - Silas Condit (1778–1861), New Jersey Assemblyman 1812–13 1816, New Jersey State Senator 1819–22, U.S. Representative from New Jersey 1831–33, delegate to the New Jersey Constitutional Convention 1844. Son of John Condit.

== The Congers ==
- Omar D. Conger (1818–1898), Judge in St. Clair County, Michigan 1850–54; Michigan State Senator 1855–59; delegate to the Michigan Constitutional Convention 1866; U.S. Representative from Michigan 1869–81; delegate to the Republican National Convention 1880; U.S. Senator from Michigan 1881–87. Brother of Chauncey S. Conger.
- Chauncey S. Conger, Illinois State Representative 1863–64, Circuit Court Judge in Illinois 1879. Brother of Omar D. Conger.
- Edwin H. Conger (1843–1907), Treasurer of Dallas County, Iowa 1877–81; Treasurer of Iowa 1881–85; U.S. Representative from Iowa 1885–91; U.S. Minister to Brazil 1890–93 1897–98; U.S. Minister to China 1898–1905; U.S. Ambassador to Mexico 1905. First cousin of Omar D. Conger and Chauncey S. Conger.
  - Chauncey S. Conger (1882–1963), delegate to the Democratic National Convention 1932, Judge in White County, Illinois 1934–42. Son of Chauncey S. Conger.

== The Conklings ==
- Alfred Conkling (1789–1874), District Attorney of Montgomery County, New York 1818–21; U.S. Representative from New York 1821–23; U.S. District Court Judge in New York 1825–52; U.S. Minister to Mexico 1852–53. Father of Frederick A. Conkling and Roscoe Conkling.
  - Frederick A. Conkling (1816–1891), New York Assemblyman 1854 1859–60, U.S. Representative from New York 1861–63, candidate for Republican nomination for Mayor of New York City 1868. Son of Alfred Conkling.
  - Roscoe Conkling (1829–1888), District Attorney of Oneida County, New York 1850; Mayor of Utica, New York 1858; U.S. Representative from New York 1859–63 1865–67; U.S. Senator from New York 1867–81. Son of Alfred Conkling.
    - Alfred R. Conkling (1850–1917), New York Assemblyman 1892. Son of Frederick A. Conkling.
    - Howard Conkling, New York Assemblyman 1892–93 1903 1914–15. Son of Frederick A. Conkling.
    - Alfred Conkling Coxe Sr. (1847–1923), U.S. District Court Judge in New York 1882–1902, Judge of U.S. Court of Appeals 1902–17. Grandson of Alfred Conkling.
      - Alfred Conkling Coxe Jr. (1880–1957), U.S. District Court Judge in New York 1929–51. Son of Alfred Conkling Coxe Sr.

NOTE: Roscoe Conkling was also son-in-law of New York Assemblyman Henry Seymour and brother-in-law of New York Governor Horatio Seymour.

== The Connallys of Texas ==
- John Connally (1917–1993), Governor of Texas 1963–1969, United States Secretary of the Navy (1961–1962), United States Secretary of the Treasury (1971–1972). Brother of Merrill Connally. Brother of Wayne Connally.
- Merrill Connally (1921–2001), Actor. Wilson County, Texas commissioner (1947–1950; 1955–1959). Served as a delegate to the Democratic National Convention 1956, 1960. Brother of John Connally. Brother of Wayne Connally.
- Wayne Connally (1923–2000), Member of the Texas House of Representatives (1965–1967), Member of the Texas Senate (1967–1973). Brother of John Connally.

== The Connells ==
- William Connell (1827–1909), delegate to the Republican National Convention 1896, Pennsylvania Republican Committeeman, U.S. Representative from Pennsylvania 1897–1903 1904–05. Father of Charles Robert Connell.
  - Charles Robert Connell (1864–1922), U.S. Representative from Pennsylvania 1921–22. Son of William Connell.

== The Connerys ==
- William P. Connery Sr. (1855–1928), Mayor of Lynn, Massachusetts 1911–12. Father of William P. Connery Jr. and Lawrence J. Connery.
  - William P. Connery Jr. (1888–1937), U.S. Representative from Massachusetts 1923–37, delegate to the Democratic National Convention 1932. Son of William P. Connery Sr.
  - Lawrence J. Connery (1895–1941), U.S. Representative from Massachusetts 1937–41. Son of William P. Connery Sr.

== The Connors ==
- Bob Connor (1938–1997), Member of the Delaware Senate from the 12th district
  - Dorinda Connor (1947–2024), Member of the Delaware Senate from the 12th district, widow of Bob Connor

== The Conrads and Schafers ==
- Ed Schafer (born 1946), candidate for U.S. Representative from North Dakota 1990, Governor of North Dakota 1992–2000, U.S. Secretary of Agriculture 2008–09. Former brother-in-law of Kent Conrad.
- Kent Conrad (born 1948), candidate for Auditor of North Dakota 1976, Tax Commissioner of North Dakota 1981–87, U.S. Senator from North Dakota 1987–2013. Former brother-in-law of Ed Schafer.

== The Contees, Hansons, Kents, Pratts, and Worthingtons ==
- Thomas Contee (1729–1811), member of the Maryland Legislature. Brother-in-law of John Hanson.
- John Hanson (1715–1783), Maryland Colony Representative 1757–63 1765–66 1768–69, Delegate to the Continental Congress from Maryland 1780–82, President of the U.S. Congress 1781–82. Brother-in-law of Thomas Contee.
  - Benjamin Contee (1755–1815), Maryland House Delegate 1785–87, Delegate to the Confederation Congress from Maryland 1787–88, U.S. Representative from Maryland 1789–91. Son of Thomas Contee.
    - Alexander Contee Hanson (1786–1819), Maryland House Delegate 1811–15, U.S. Representative from Maryland 1813–16, U.S. Senator from Maryland 1816–19. Grandson of John Hanson.
    - Thomas Contee Worthington (1782–1847), Maryland Executive Councilman 1830, Maryland State Representative 1818, U.S. Representative from Maryland 1825–27. Nephew of Benjamin Contee.
    - William Grafton Delaney Worthington (1785–1856), candidate for U.S. Representative from Maryland 1823, Governor of East Florida Territory 1821–23, Judge of the Baltimore, Maryland Courts. Grandson of Thomas Contee.
    - Joseph Kent (1779–1837), U.S. Representative from Maryland 1811–15 1819–26, Governor of Maryland 1826–29, U.S. Senator from Maryland 1833–37. Son-in-law of Benjamin Contee.
      - Thomas Pratt (1804–1869), Maryland House Delegate 1832–35, Maryland State Senator 1838–43, Governor of Maryland 1845–48, U.S. Senator from Maryland 1850–57, delegate to the Democratic National Convention 1864, candidate for U.S. Senate from Maryland 1867. Son-in-law of Joseph Kent.

== The Conways and Seviers ==
See Conway and Sevier family

== The Conys ==
- Samuel Cony (1811–1870), Mayor of Augusta, Maine 1854; Governor of Maine 1864–67. Father of Daniel A. Cony.
  - Daniel A. Cony (1837–1892), Mayor of Augusta, Maine 1875. Son of Samuel Cony.

== The Conyerses ==
- John Conyers, Jr. (1929–2017), U.S. Representative from Michigan 1964–2017, co-founder of Congressional Black Caucus, Dean of the United States House of Representatives 2015–2017. Delegate to Democratic National Convention from Michigan, 1968, 1972, 1976, 1984, 1988, 1996, 2000, 2004, 2008, 2012, 2016. Candidate for Mayor of Detroit, 1989.
- Monica Conyers (born 1964), Detroit City Council President 2006–2010. Wife of John Conyers Jr.
  - Ian Conyers (born 1988), Michigan State Senator 2016–2018. Grand-nephew of John Conyers Jr.

== The Cooks and Edwards ==
- Benjamin Edwards (1753–1829), Maryland House Delegate 1782–84, delegate to the Maryland Constitutional Convention 1788, Maryland State Court Judge 1793, U.S. Representative from Maryland 1795. Father of Ninian Edwards and Cyrus Edwards.
  - Ninian Edwards (1775–1833), Governor of Illinois Territory 1809–18, U.S. Senator from Illinois 1918–24, Governor of Illinois 1826–30. Son of Benjamin Edwards.
  - Cyrus Edwards, candidate for Governor of Illinois 1838, delegate to the Illinois Constitutional Convention 1847. Son of Benjamin Edwards.
    - Ninian W. Edwards (1809–1889), Attorney General of Illinois 1834–35, Illinois State Representative 1837–41 1849–53, Illinois State Senator 1845–49, delegate to the Illinois Constitutional Convention 1847. Son of Ninian Edwards.
    - Daniel Pope Cook (1794–1827), candidate for U.S. Representative from Illinois 1818, Attorney General of Illinois, U.S. Representative from Illinois 1819–27. Son-in-law of Ninian Edwards.
      - John Cook (1825–1910), Mayor of Springfield, Illinois; Illinois Assemblyman. Son of Daniel Pope Cook.

NOTE: Ninian W. Edwards was also brother-in-law of U.S. President Abraham Lincoln, and his daughter, Julia, was daughter-in-law of U.S. Representative David J. Baker. Daniel Pope Cook was nephew of U.S. Senator John Pope and U.S. Representative Nathaniel Pope.

== The Cooks, and Thometzes ==
- Merrill Cook (born 1946), candidate for Mayor of Salt Lake City, Utah 1985 2004; candidate for Governor of Utah 1988; U.S. Representative from Utah 1997–2001. Distant cousin by marriage of David Thometz.
  - David Thometz (born 1966), delegate to the Democratic National Convention 2000. Grandnephew by marriage of Karl Snow.

NOTE: David Thometz's aunt, Teresa Woodward, married (and later divorced) Michael Brockbank Snow, the nephew of Utah State Senator Karl Snow.

== The Cookerlys, Hughes, and McLeans ==
- Grafton Fleener Cookerly (1815–1885), Indiana State Representative 1845–48, candidate for U.S. Representative from Indiana 1849, delegate to the Indiana Constitutional Convention 1850 1851, delegate Democratic National Convention 1856, Mayor of Terre Haute, Indiana 1867–71. Uncle of William Edward McLean.
- James Hughes (1823–1873), Circuit Court Judge in Indiana 1852–56, U.S. Representative from Indiana 1857–59, Judge of the U.S. Court of Claims 1860–64, Indiana State Representative 1864–66. Stepfather-in-law of William Edward McLean.
  - William Edward McLean (1832–1906), Indiana State Senator 1857–60 1893–96, Indiana State Representative 1861 1867–68, candidate for U.S. Representative from Indiana 1876. Nephew of Grafton Fleener Cookerly.

== The Coolidges ==
- Archibald C. Coolidge (1866–1928), History professor and member of the United States Foreign Service.
  - Calvin Galusha Coolidge (1815–1878), Vermont State Representative. Father of John Calvin Coolidge Sr. Grandfather of Calvin Coolidge.
  - John Calvin Coolidge Sr. (1845–1926), Vermont State Representative, Vermont State Senator, Justice of the Peace. Father of Calvin Coolidge.
- Arthur Brown (1843–1906), U.S. Senator from Utah 1896–97. First cousin three times removed of Calvin Coolidge.
    - William Wallace Stickney (1853–1932), Governor of Vermont 1900–02. Cousin of Calvin Coolidge.
    - Calvin Coolidge (1872–1933), member of the Republican City Committee of Northampton, Massachusetts; member of the Northampton, Massachusetts City Council 1898–99; City Solicitor of Northampton, Massachusetts 1900–02; Clerk of Courts of Northampton, Massachusetts 1903–04; candidate for the Northampton, Massachusetts school board, 1904; Massachusetts State Representative 1907–08; Mayor of Northampton, Massachusetts 1910–11; Massachusetts State Senator 1912–15; Lieutenant Governor of Massachusetts 1916–19; Governor of Massachusetts 1919–21; Vice President of the United States 1921–23; President of the United States 1923–29. Descendant of Archibald C. Coolidge, son of John Calvin Coolidge Sr.; first cousin three times removed of Arthur Brown.
    - Richard B. Coolidge, Massachusetts State Representative 1920–22, Mayor of Medford, Massachusetts 1923–26; delegate to the Republican National Convention 1928. Fourth cousin of Calvin Coolidge.
    - Arthur W. Coolidge (1881–1952), Massachusetts State Representative 1937–40, Massachusetts State Senator 1941–46, Lieutenant Governor of Massachusetts 1947–49, candidate for Governor of Massachusetts 1950. Fourth cousin of Calvin Coolidge.

NOTE: Calvin Coolidge was also a distant relative of Vermont Governor Carlos Coolidge. Calvin Coolidge's son, John, was also son-in-law of Connecticut Governor John H. Trumbull.

== The Coolidges of Massachusetts ==
- Frederick S. Coolidge (1841–1906), Selectman of Westminster, Massachusetts; Massachusetts Democratic Committeeman; Massachusetts State Representative 1875; U.S. Representative from Massachusetts 1891–93. Father of Marcus A. Coolidge.
  - Marcus A. Coolidge (1865–1947), Mayor of Fitchburg, Massachusetts; Chairman of the Massachusetts Democratic Convention 1920; U.S. Senator from Massachusetts 1931–37. Son of Frederick S. Coolidge.

== The Coombs ==
- Nathan Coombs (1824–1877), California Assemblyman 1855–56 1860–61. Father of Frank Coombs.
  - Frank Coombs (1853–1934), District Attorney of Napa County, California 1880–85; California Assemblyman 1887–89 1921–23 1925–27; U.S. Minister to Japan 1892–93; U.S. Attorney in California 1899–1901; U.S. Representative from California 1901–03. Son of Nathan Coombs.
    - Nathan F. Coombs, delegate to the Republican National Convention 1944. Son of Frank Coombs.

== The Cooneys ==
- Frank Henry Cooney (1872–1935), Lieutenant Governor of Montana 1933, Governor of Montana 1933–35.
  - Mike Cooney (born 1954), Montana State Representative 1977–81, Secretary of State of Montana 1989–2001, Montana State Senator 2003–11, Lieutenant Governor of Montana 2016–present. Grandson of Frank Henry Cooney.

== The Coopers ==
- William Prentice Cooper (1870–1961), Mayor of Shelbyville, Tennessee 1905–07, Speaker of the Tennessee House of Representatives from 1915–17. Father of Prentice Cooper.
  - Prentice Cooper (1895–1969), Governor of Tennessee 1939–45, U.S. Ambassador to Peru 1946–48. Father of James H.S. Cooper and John Cooper.
    - James H.S. Cooper (born 1954), U.S. Representative from Tennessee 1983–95, 2003–2023, candidate for U.S. Senate from Tennessee 1994. Son of Prentice Cooper.
    - John Cooper (born 1956), Mayor of Nashville 2019–2023. Son of Prentice Cooper.

== The Coopers of Delaware ==
- Thomas Cooper (1764–1829), Delaware State Representative 1803–08, U.S. Representative from Delaware 1813–17. Brother of William B. Cooper.
- William B. Cooper (1771–1849), Governor of Delaware 1841–45. Brother of Thomas Cooper.

== The Coopers of Kentucky ==
- John Cooper, Circuit Court Judge in Kentucky. Father of John Sherman Cooper.
  - John Sherman Cooper (1901–1991), Kentucky State Representative 1928–30, County Judge in Kentucky 1930–38, candidate for Governor of Kentucky 1939, U.S. Senator from Kentucky 1946–49 1952–55 1956–73, delegate to the Republican National Convention 1948 1956 1960 1972, U.S Ambassador to India 1955–56, U.S. Ambassador to Nepal 1955–56, U.S. Ambassador to East Germany 1974–76. Son of John Cooper.

== The Coopers of North Carolina ==
- Roy Asberry Cooper Jr. (1927–2014), lawyer and political strategist
  - Roy Asberry Cooper III (born 1957), member of the North Carolina House of Representatives 1987–1991, member of the North Carolina Senate 1991–2001, 50th Attorney General of North Carolina 2001–2017, 75th Governor of North Carolina 2017–2025; son of Roy Asberry Cooper Jr.
  - Kristin Bernhardt Cooper (born 1956), First Lady of North Carolina 2017–2025; wife of Roy Asberry Cooper III
  - Pell C. Cooper (born 1959), Judge of the 7th Judicial District Court of North Carolina; son of Roy Asberry Cooper Jr.

== The Coopers of Tennessee ==
- Edmund Cooper (1821–1911), Tennessee State Representative 1849, delegate to the Tennessee Constitutional Convention 1861, U.S. Representative from Tennessee 1866–67. Brother of Henry Cooper.
- Henry Cooper (1827–1884), Tennessee State Representative 1853–55 1857–59, Circuit Court Judge in Tennessee 1862–66, Tennessee State Senator 1869–70, U.S. Senator from Tennessee 1871–77. Brother of Edmund Cooper.

== The Coopers of Wisconsin ==
- Joel H. Cooper (1821–1893), Wisconsin State Assemblyman 1852, Postmaster of Burlington, Wisconsin 1861–74. Father of Henry Allen Cooper.
  - Henry Allen Cooper (1850–1931), District Attorney of Racine County, Wisconsin; delegate to the Republican National Convention 1884 1908 1924; Wisconsin State Senator 1887–89; U.S. Representative from Wisconsin 1893–1919 1921–31. Son of Joel H. Cooper.

== The Coopers, Bryces, Hewitts, and Tiemanns ==
- Peter Cooper (1791–1883), candidate for President of the United States 1876. Father of Edward Cooper.
  - Edward Cooper (1824–1905), delegate to the Democratic National Convention 1860 1876, Mayor of New York City 1879–80. Son of Peter Cooper.
  - Daniel Fawcett Tiemann, Mayor of New York City 1858–60, New York State Senator 1872–73. Nephew by marriage of Peter Cooper.
  - Abram S. Hewitt (1822–1903), U.S. Representative from New York 1875–79 1881–86, Mayor of New York City 1887–88. Son-in-law of Peter Cooper.
    - Lloyd Bryce (1851–1917), U.S. Representative from New York 1887–89, U.S. Minister to the Netherlands 1911–13, U.S. Minister to Luxembourg 1911–13. Son-in-law of Edward Cooper.

== The Coopers and Nisbets ==
- Mark Anthony Cooper (1800–1885), Georgia State Representative 1833, U.S. Representative from Georgia 1839–41 1842–43, candidate for Governor of Georgia 1841 1843. Cousin of Eugenius Aristides Nisbet.
- Eugenius Aristides Nisbet (1803–1871), Georgia State Representative 1827–30, Georgia State Senator 1830–37, candidate for U.S. Representative from Georgia 1836, U.S. Representative from Georgia 1839–41, Justice of the Georgia Supreme Court 1845–53, candidate for Governor of Georgia 1861. Cousin of Mark Anthony Cooper.

== The Coopers and Wileys ==
- John J. Cooper, Treasurer of Indiana 1883–87. Father-in-law of John McClure Wiley.
  - John McClure Wiley (1846–1912), New York Assemblyman 1871–72, delegate to the Democratic National Convention 1884 1888 1892, U.S. Representative from New York 1889–91, U.S. Consul in Bordeaux, France 1893–97. Son-in-law of John J. Cooper.
    - John C. Wiley (1893–1967), U.S. Consul General in Antwerp, Belgium 1935–37; U.S. Consul in Vienna, Austria 1937–38; U.S. Minister to Estonia 1938–40; U.S. Minister to Latvia 1938–40; U.S. Ambassador to Colombia 1944–47; U.S. Ambassador to Portugal 1947–48; U.S. Ambassador to Iran 1948–50; U.S. Ambassador to Panama 1951–53. Son of John McClure Wiley.

== The Copelands ==
- Joseph T. Copeland (1813–1893), Michigan State Senator 1850–51, Justice of the Michigan Supreme Court 1852–57. Brother of Roscoe P. Copeland.
- Roscoe P. Copeland (1838–1933), President of Dexter, Michigan. Brother of Joseph T. Copeland.
- George M. Copeland (1815–1892), New York Assemblyman 1852. Fourth cousin once removed of Joseph T. Copeland and Roscoe P. Copeland.
  - Arthur Corwin Copeland (1841–1904), Indiana State Representative 1876–79. Third cousin once removed of George M. Copeland.
  - Royal S. Copeland (1868–1938), Mayor of Ann Arbor, Michigan 1901–03; U.S. Senator from New York 1923–38; delegate to the Democratic National Convention 1924 1936; candidate for Mayor of New York City 1937. Son of Roscoe P. Copeland.

== The Córdovas of Puerto Rico ==
- Félix Córdova Dávila (1878–1938), Judge of the Caguas, Puerto Rico Municipal Court 1904; Judge of the Manatí, Puerto Rico 1904–08; District Attorney of Aguadilla, Puerto Rico 1908; Judge of the Guayama, Puerto Rico District Court 1908–10; Judge of the Arecibo, Puerto Rico 1910–11; Judge of the San Juan, Puerto Rico District Court 1911–17; Resident Commissioner of Puerto Rico to the U.S. Congress 1917–32; Justice of the Puerto Rico Supreme Court 1932–38. Father of Jorge Luis Córdova.
  - Jorge Luis Córdova (1907–1994), Puerto Rico Superior Court Judge 1940–45, Justice of the Puerto Rico Supreme Court 1945–46, Resident Commissioner of Puerto Rico to the U.S. Congress 1969–73. Son of Félix Córdova Dávila.

== The Cornells ==
- Ezekiel Cornell (1733–1800), Rhode Island Representative to the Continental Congress.
- Ezra Cornell (1807–1874), New York Assemblyman 1862–63, New York State Senator 1864–67. Father of Alonzo B. Cornell.
- Thomas Cornell (1814–1890), Republican Representative to the United States Congress 1867–69, 1881–83.
- Francis R. E. Cornell (1821–1881), represented the 26th District in the New York State Senate 1852–53, Member of the Minnesota House of Representatives 1861–62 and 1865, and Minnesota Attorney General 1868–74.
- Dudley E. Cornell (1837–1911), Mayor of Kansas City, Kansas 1907–08
- Thurber Cornell (1885–1954), Member of the Michigan House of Representatives 1945–48
- Alonzo B. Cornell (1832–1904), candidate for Lieutenant Governor of New York 1868, Chairman of the New York Republican Party 1870–74 1875–77 1878–79, New York Assemblyman 1873, Governor of New York 1880–83. Son of Ezra Cornell.

Note: Alonzo B. Cornell's son, Charles Ezra, was also son-in-law of New York Assemblyman Charles C. Bouck.

Note: Other US political figures which descend from Thomas Cornell (settler) include Presidents Richard Nixon and Jimmy Carter, John Kerry, William Ellery (signer of the United States Declaration of Independence), and Bob Graham, among others.

== The Cornings ==
- Erastus Corning (1794–1872), mayor of Albany, New York, 1834–37; formed New York Central railroad; U.S. Congressman from New York, 1857–59, 1861–63.
  - Parker Corning (1874–1943), U.S. Congressman from New York, 28th District, 1923–37; grandson of Erastus Corning.
  - Edwin Corning (1883–1934), New York Democratic chair, 1926–28; Lieutenant Governor of New York, 1927–28; grandson of Erastus Corning.
    - Erastus Corning 2nd (1909–1983), member of the New York State Assembly (1936–37), member of the New York State Senate (1937–41). Mayor of Albany, 1942–83. Son of Edwin Corning.
    - Edwin Corning Jr. (1919–1964), member of the New York State Assembly (1955–1959). Son of Edwin Corning.

== The Corrigans ==
- Francis P. Corrigan (1881–1968), U.S. Minister to El Salvador 1934–37, U.S. Minister to Panama 1937–39, U.S. Ambassador to Venezuela 1939–47. Father of Robert F. Corrigan.
  - Robert F. Corrigan (born 1914), U.S. Vice Consul in Rio de Janeiro, Brazil 1941–43; U.S. Consul General in São Paulo, Brazil 1970–71; U.S. Ambassador to Rwanda 1971–73. Son of Francis P. Corrigan.

== The Cortezes ==
- Manny Cortez, Clark County, Nevada Commissioner. Father of Catherine Cortez Masto.
  - Catherine Cortez Masto (born 1964), Attorney General of Nevada 2007–2015, U.S. Senator from Nevada 2017–present. Daughter of Manny Cortez.

== The Corwins ==
- Matthias Corwin (1761–1829), Ohio, Speaker of the Ohio House of Representatives 1811, 1815. Father of Thomas Corwin.
  - Moses B. Corwin (1790–1872), Ohio State Representative 1838–39, U.S. Representative from Ohio 1849–51 1853–55. Brother of Thomas Corwin.
  - Thomas Corwin (1794–1865), Ohio State Representative 1822–23 1829, U.S. Representative from Ohio 1831–40 1859–61, Governor of Ohio 1840–42, U.S. Senator from Ohio 1845–50, U.S. Secretary of the Treasury 1850–53, U.S. Ambassador to Mexico 1861–64. Brother of Moses B. Corwin.
    - Franklin Corwin (1818–1879), Illinois State Representative 1846–47, Illinois State Senator 1847–49, U.S. Representative from Illinois 1873–75. Nephew of Moses B. Corwin and Thomas Corwin.

== The Corzines ==
- Roy A. Corzine (1882–1957), Illinois State Representative 1927–1933. Grandfather of Jon Corzine.
  - Jon Corzine (born 1947), United States Senator from New Jersey 2001–2006; Governor of New Jersey 2006–2010. Grandson of Roy Corzine.

== The Cottons ==
- Aylett R. Cotton (1826–1912), Member of the Iowa House of Representatives 1868–1871; Member of the United States House of Representatives from Iowa 1871–1875. Brother of Wickliffe Cotton.
- Wickliffe Cotton (1843–1912), Member of the Iowa Senate 1882–1886. Brother of Aylett R. Cotton.

== The Couderts, Rands, and Tracys ==
- Benjamin F. Tracy (1830–1915), New York Assemblyman 1862, U.S. Attorney in New York 1866–77, Judge of the New York Court of Appeals 1881–83, U.S. Secretary of the Navy 1889–93, candidate for Mayor of New York City 1897. Great-grandfather of Frederic R. Coudert Jr.
  - Frederic R. Coudert (1832–1903), delegate to the Democratic National Convention 1896. Grandfather of Frederic R. Coudert Jr.
    - Frederic R. Coudert Jr. (1898–1972), U.S. Attorney in New York 1924–25, candidate for District Attorney of New York County, New York 1929; delegate to the Republican National Convention 1936 1940 1944 1948; New York State Senator 1939–46; U.S. Representative from New York 1947–59. Grandson of Frederic R. Coudert.
      - William Rand Jr. (born 1926), Justice of the New York Supreme Court 1962. Son-in-law of Frederic R. Coudert Jr.

== The Coughlins ==
- Clarence Dennis Coughlin (1883–1946), Chairman of the Luzerne County, Pennsylvania Republican Committee 1915–17; U.S. Representative from Pennsylvania 1921–23; Judge of Luzerne County, Pennsylvania Court of Common Pleas 1925–37. Uncle of Lawrence Coughlin.
  - Lawrence Coughlin (1929–2001), Pennsylvania State Representative 1965–67, Pennsylvania State Senator 1967–69, U.S. Representative from Pennsylvania 1969–93. Nephew of Clarence Dennis Coughlin.

== The Couzens ==
- James J. Couzens (1872–1936), Mayor of Detroit, Michigan 1919–22; U.S. Senator from Michigan 1922–36. Father of Frank Couzens.
  - Frank Couzens (1902–1950), Mayor of Detroit, Michigan 1934–38. Son of James J. Couzens.

== The Cowgills ==
- Calvin Cowgill (1819–1903), Indiana State Representative 1851–52 1865, U.S. Representative from Indiana 1879–81. Father of Cary E. Cowgill.
  - Cary E. Cowgill (1843–1914), Indiana State Representative 1873, delegate to the Republican National Convention 1904. Son of Calvin Cowgill.

== The Cowles and Holdens ==
- William Woods Holden (1818–1892), delegate to the North Carolina Democratic Convention 1843, member of the North Carolina House of Commons, candidate for Democratic nomination for Governor of North Carolina 1858, Governor of North Carolina 1865 1868–71. Grandfather of Charles H. Cowles.
  - William H. H. Cowles (1840–1901), Solicitor in North Carolina 1874–78, U.S. Representative from North Carolina 1885–87. Uncle of Charles H. Cowles.
    - Charles H. Cowles (1875–1957), North Carolina State Representative 1904–08 1920–24 1928–30 1932–34, delegate to the Republican National Convention 1904 1908 1912 1916, U.S. Representative from North Carolina 1909–11, North Carolina State Senator 1938–40. Grandson of William Woods Holden.

== The Cowles of Iowa ==
- Gardner Cowles Sr. (1861–1946), Member of the Iowa House of Representatives 1899–1903. Brother of LaMonte Cowles.
- LaMonte Cowles (1859–1942) Member of the Iowa Senate 1911–15. Brother of Gardner Cowles Sr.

== The Coxes ==
- James Cox (1753–1810), New Jersey Assemblyman 1801–07, U.S. Representative from New Jersey 1809–10. Father of Ezekiel Taylor Cox.
  - Ezekiel Taylor Cox, Ohio State Senator. Son of James Cox.
    - Samuel S. Cox (1824–1889), delegate to the Democratic National Convention 1864 1868, U.S. Representative from Ohio 1957–65, U.S. Representative from New York 1869–73 1873–85, U.S. Minister to Turkey 1885–86. Son of Ezekiel Taylor Cox.

== The Cramtons ==
- Louis C. Cramton (1875–1966), Michigan State Representative 1909–10 1948–60, U.S. Representative from Michigan 1913–31, candidate for Republican nomination for U.S. Representative from Michigan 1932, Circuit Judge in Michigan 1934–41, delegate to the Republican National Convention 1948. Father of Louis K. Cramton.
  - Louis K. Cramton, Michigan State Representative 1971–80. Son of Louis C. Cramton.

== The Cranes of Illinois ==
- Philip M. Crane (1930–2014), U.S. Representative from Illinois 1969–2005, candidate for Republican nomination for President of the United States 1980. Brother of Daniel B. Crane.
- Daniel B. Crane (1936–2019), U.S. Representative from Illinois 1979–85. Brother of Philip M. Crane.

== The Cranes of New Jersey and Ohio ==
- Stephen Crane (1709–1780), Sheriff of Essex County, New Jersey; Elizabethtown, New Jersey Committeeman 1750 1776; Judge of Court of Commons Pleas in New Jersey Colony; New Jersey Colony Assemblyman 1766–73; Mayor of Elizabethtown, New Jersey 1772–74; Delegate to the Continental Congress from New Jersey 1774–76; New Jersey Councilman 1776–77 1779. Grandfather of Joseph Halsey Crane.
  - Joseph Halsey Crane (1782–1851), Ohio State Representative 1809, prosecuting attorney of Montgomery County, Ohio 1813–16; Judge of Ohio Circuit Court 1817–29; U.S. Representative from Ohio 1829–37. Grandson of Stephen Crane.

== The Cranstons ==
- John Cranston (1625–1680), Deputy Governor of Rhode Island Colony 1672–78, Governor of Rhode Island Colony 1678–80. Father of Samuel Cranston.
  - Samuel Cranston (1659–1727), Governor of Rhode Island Colony 1698–1727. Son of John Cranston.

NOTE: Samuel Cranston was also nephew of Rhode Island Colony Governor Walter Clarke.

== The Cranstons of Rhode Island ==
- Robert B. Cranston (1791–1873), Sheriff of Newport County, Rhode Island 1818–27; Postmaster of Newport, Rhode Island 1827; U.S. Representative from Rhode Island 1837–43 1847–49; Rhode Island State Representative 1843–47; Rhode Island State Senator; Mayor of Newport, Rhode Island 1853. Brother of Henry Y. Cranston.
- Henry Y. Cranston (1789–1864), Clerk of Rhode Island Court of Common Pleas 1818–33, Rhode Island State Representative 1827–43 1847–54, U.S. Representative from Rhode Island 1843–47. Brother of Robert B. Cranston.

== The Cravens ==
- Felix Ives Batson (1819–1871), Arkansas State Court Judge 1853, Justice of the Arkansas Supreme Court 1858, Confederate States Representative from Arkansas 1862–65. Father-in-law of Jordan E. Cravens.
  - Jordan E. Cravens (1830–1914), Arkansas State Representative 1860, Arkansas State Senator 1866–68, U.S. Representative from Arkansas 1877–83, Circuit Court Judge 1890–94. Son-in-law of Felix Ives Batson.
  - William B. Cravens (1872–1939), U.S. Representative from Arkansas 1907–13 1933–39. Cousin of Jordan E. Cravens.
    - William Fadjo Cravens (1899–1974), U.S. Representative from Arkansas 1939–49. Son of William B. Cravens.

== The Cravens of Indiana ==
- James H. Cravens (1802–1876), Indiana State Representative 1831–32 1856, Indiana State Senator 1839, U.S. Representative from Indiana 1841–43, candidate for Governor of Indiana 1852, candidate for Attorney General of Indiana 1856. Second cousin of James A. Cravens.
- James A. Cravens (1818–1893), Indiana State Representative 1848–49, Indiana State Senator 1850–53, U.S. Representative from Indiana 1861–65, delegate to the National Union Convention, delegate to the Democratic National Convention 1868. Second cousin of James H. Cravens.
  - Aaron Asbury Cravens, Indiana State Representative 1893 1899. Son of James A. Cravens.

== The Crawfords ==
- William H. Crawford (1772–1834), member of the Georgia State Legislature 1803–07, U.S. Senator from Georgia 1807–13, U.S. Minister to France 1813–15, U.S. Secretary of War 1815–16, U.S. Secretary of the Treasury 1816–25, candidate for President of the United States 1824. Cousin of George W. Crawford.
- George W. Crawford (1798–1872), Attorney General of Georgia 1827–31, U.S. Representative from Georgia 1843, Governor of Georgia 1843–47, U.S. Secretary of War 1849–50. Cousin of William H. Crawford.

== The Crawfords of Connecticut ==
- Sara Crawford (1876–1949), member of the Connecticut House of Representatives 1925–27; 1931–37, Connecticut Secretary of State 1939–41
  - Sara Crawford Maschal (died c. 1983), elected to the Connecticut House of Representatives in 1938. Daughter of Sarah Crawford.

== The Creedons ==
- Michael C. Creedon, member of the Massachusetts House of Representatives (1974–1988), Massachusetts Senate (1988–1996). Brother of Robert S. Creedon Jr.
- Robert S. Creedon Jr., member of the Massachusetts House of Representatives (1968–1972), Massachusetts Senate (1997–2009) Brother of Michael C. Creedon Jr. Husband of Geraldine Creedon.
- Geraldine Creedon, member of the Massachusetts House of Representatives (1995–2013). Wife of Robert S. Creedon Jr.

== The Cresaps ==
- Luther Martin (1748–1826), Attorney General of Maryland 1778–1805 1818–22, Delegate to the Continental Congress from Maryland 1784. First cousin by marriage of Joseph Cresap, James Cresap, and Thomas Cresap.
- Joseph Cresap (1755–1827), Maryland State Senator 1816–20. First cousin by marriage of Luther Martin.
- James Cresap (1770–1836), Maryland House Delegate. First cousin by marriage of Luther Martin.
- Thomas Cresap (1772–1845), Orphan's Court Judge in Maryland. First cousin by marriage of Luther Martin.

== The Crisfields and Pages ==
- John Woodland Crisfield (1806–1897), Maryland State Representative 1836, U.S. Representative from Maryland 1847–49 1861–63, delegate to the Maryland Constitutional Convention 1850, delegate to the Union Party National Convention 1866. Father of Henry Page.
  - Henry Page (1841–1913), delegate to the Maryland Constitutional Convention 1867, State Attorney of Somerset County, Maryland 1870–84; U.S. Representative from Maryland 1891–92; Judge of the Maryland Court of Appeals 1892; Chief District Court Judge in Maryland 1892–1908. Son of John Woodland Crisfield.

== The Crisps ==
- Charles Frederick Crisp (1845–1896), Solicitor General in Georgia 1872–77, Judge in Georgia 1878–82, U.S. Representative from Georgia 1883–96, Speaker of the U.S. House of Representatives 1891–93 1893–95. Father of Charles R. Crisp.
  - Charles R. Crisp (1870–1867), Parliamentarian of the U.S. House of Representatives 1891–95 1811–13, U.S. Representative from Georgia 1896–97 1913-32, Parliamentarian of the Democratic National Convention 1912, candidate for U.S. Senate 1932. Son of Charles Frederick Crisp.

== The Crittendens ==
- John Crittenden Sr. (1754–1809), member of the Virginia House of Burgesses 1790–1805. Father of John J. Crittenden, Thomas T. Crittenden, and Robert Crittenden.
  - John J. Crittenden (1786–1863), Kentucky State Representative, U.S. Senator from Kentucky 1817–19 1835–41 1842–48 1855–61, U.S. District Attorney in Kentucky 1827–29, Attorney General of the United States 1841 1850–53, Governor of Kentucky 1848–50. Son of John Crittenden Sr.
  - Thomas T. Crittenden (1788–1832), Kentucky Secretary of State 1828–32. Son of John Crittenden Sr.
  - Robert Crittenden (1797–1834), Secretary of Arkansas Territory 1819–29, Governor of Arkansas Territory 1828–29. Son of John Crittenden Sr.
    - Thomas Leonidas Crittenden (1819–1893), US General. U.S. Consul in England, Treasurer of Kentucky. Son of John J. Crittenden.
    - Thomas Theodore Crittenden (1832–1909), Attorney General of Missouri 1864, U.S. Representative from Missouri 1873–75 1877–79, Governor of Missouri 1881–85, U.S. Consul in Mexico 1893–97. Nephew of John J. Crittenden.
      - Thomas T. Crittenden Jr. (1863–1938), Mayor of Kansas City, Missouri 1908–10. Son of Thomas Theodore Crittenden.

Note:John J. Crittenden's second wife was Maria Knox Todd, the daughter of District Judge Harry Innes.

== The Crocherons ==
- Henry Crocheron (1772–1819), U.S. Representative from New York 1815–17. Brother of Jacob Crocheron.
- Jacob Crocheron (1774–1849), Sheriff of Richmond County, New York 1802 1811 1821; U.S. Representative from New York 1829–31. Brother of Henry Crocheron.

== The Crocketts ==
- David S. Crockett (1786–1836), Tennessee State Representative 1821–23, candidate for U.S. Representative from Tennessee 1825, U.S. Representative from Tennessee 1827–31 1833–35. Father of John Wesely Crockett.
  - John Wesley Crockett (1807–1852), U.S. Representative from Tennessee 1837–41, attorney general in Tennessee 1841–43. Son of David S. Crockett.

NOTE: David S. Crockett is also grandfather of Portia Rebecca Crockett, who is former sister-in-law of California State Senator Thomas Hayden.

== The Crocketts of Michigan ==
- George W. Crockett Jr. (1909–1997), Recorder's Court Judge in Michigan 1966–78, U.S. Representative from Michigan 1980–91, delegate to the Democratic National Convention 1984. Father of George W. Crockett III.
  - George W. Crockett III, candidate for Michigan State Representative 1966, Circuit Court Judge in Michigan 2001. Son of George W. Crockett Jr.

== The Crofts ==
- George W. Croft (1846–1904), South Carolina State Representative 1882–83 1901–02, South Carolina State Senator, U.S. Representative from South Carolina 1903–04. Father of Theodore G. Croft.
  - Theodore G. Croft (1874–1920), U.S. Representative from South Carolina 1904–05, South Carolina State Representative 1907–08, South Carolina State Senator 1909–12. Son of George W. Croft.

== The Crofts of Alaska ==
- Leland Chancy Croft (1937–2022), Alaska State Representative 1969–71, Alaska State Senator 1971–79, candidate for Governor of Alaska 1978. Father of Eric Croft
  - Eric Chancy Croft (born 1964), Alaska State Representative 1997–2007, candidate for Governor of Alaska 2006, candidate for Mayor of Anchorage, Alaska 2009. Son of Leland Chancy Croft

== The Crouchs ==
- Joseph Crouch (1934–1989), Virginia House of Delegates, 22nd district 1982–89
  - Joyce Crouch (1935–2018), Virginia House of Delegates, 22nd district 1990–98, his wife

== The Crows ==
- William E. Crow (1870–1922), Pennsylvania State Senator 1907–21, U.S. Senator from Pennsylvania 1921–22. Father of William J. Crow.
  - William J. Crow (1902–1974), Mayor of Uniontown, Pennsylvania 1938–41; U.S. Representative from Pennsylvania 1947–49. Son of William E. Crow.

== The Crowninshields ==
- Benjamin Williams Crowninshield, Secretary of the Navy
- Jacob Crowninshield, his brother, representative from Massachusetts, appointed Secretary of the Navy
  - Arent S. Crowninshield (1843–1908), his grandson, U.S. Navy admiral

== The Crumpackers ==
- Edgar D. Crumpacker (1851–1920), prosecuting attorney in Indiana 1884–88, Appellate Judge in Indiana 1891–93, U.S. Representative from Indiana 1897–1913. Father of Maurice E. Crumpacker.
  - Maurice E. Crumpacker (1886–1927), candidate for Republican nomination for U.S. Representative from Oregon 1922, U.S. Representative from Indiana 1925–27. Son of Edgar D. Crumpacker.
  - Shepard Crumpacker Jr. (1917–1986), U.S. Representative from Indiana 1951–57. Cousin of Edgar D. Crumpacker and Maurice E. Crumpacker.

== The Cuellars ==
- Henry Cuellar (born 1955), candidate for U.S. Representative from Texas 2002, U.S. Representative from Texas 2005–present. Brother of Martin J. Cuellar.
- Martin J. Cuellar (born 1958), Sheriff of Webb County, Texas. Brother of Henry Cuellar.

== The Culbersons ==
- David B. Culberson (1830–1900), Texas State Representative 1859 1864, Texas State Senator, U.S. Representative from Texas 1875–97. Father of Charles Allen Culberson.
  - Charles Allen Culberson (1855–1925), Attorney General of Texas 1890–94, Governor of Texas 1894–98, U.S. Senator from Texas 1899–1923. Son of David B. Culberson.
  - John Culberson (born 1956), Texas State Representative 1986–2001, U.S. Representative from Texas 2001–present. Cousin of Charles Allen Culberson.

== The Culloms ==
- Alvan Cullom (1797–1877), Tennessee State Representative 1835–36, U.S. Representative from Tennessee 1843–47, Circuit Court Judge in Tennessee 1850–52. Brother of William Cullom.
- William Cullom (1810–1896), Tennessee Assemblyman 1843–47, U.S. Representative from Tennessee 1851–55 1856–57, attorney general in Tennessee 1873–78. Brother of Alvan Cullom.
  - Shelby Moore Cullom (1829–1914), Attorney of Springfield, Illinois; Illinois State Representative 1856 1860–61 1873–74; U.S. Representative from Illinois 1865–71; Governor of Illinois 1877–83; U.S. Senator from Illinois 1883–1913. Nephew of Alvan Cullom and William Cullom.

== The Culpeppers ==
- Robert C. Culpepper, educator, lawyer, state senator from 1908 to 1912 for Jackson Parish, and state district court judge in Alexandria, Louisiana, 1924 to 1942, father of William A. Culpepper
  - William A. Culpepper, lawyer and judge from Alexandria, Louisiana; served for six years on the 9th Judicial District Court and for twenty-two years on the Louisiana Court of Appeal for the Third Circuit, son of Robert C. Culpepper.

== The Culvers ==
- John Culver (1932–2018), U.S. Representative from Iowa 1965–75, U.S. Senator from Iowa 1975–81. Father of Chester Culver.
  - Chester J. Culver (born 1966), Iowa Secretary of State 1999–2007, Governor of Iowa 2007–11. Son of John Culver.
  - Mariclare Culver, delegate to the Democratic National Convention 2008. Wife of Chester J. Culver.

== The Cunninghams ==
- Bill Cunningham (born 1944), City Attorney of Eddyville, Kentucky 1974–1991, Commonwealth's Attorney for the 56th District of Kentucky 1976–1988, Justice of the Kentucky Supreme Court 2007–2019. Father of Joe Cunningham.
  - Joe Cunningham (born 1982), U.S. Representative from South Carolina 2019–present. Son of Bill Cunningham.

== The Cunninghams, Paynes, and Methvins ==
- Milton Joseph Cunningham, member of the Louisiana House 1878 to 1880 and Louisiana Senate 1880 to 1884 from Natchitoches and DeSoto parishes; state attorney general from 1884 to 1888 and 1892 to 1900, administrator of Orleans Parish 1900 to 1904, lawyer and landowner, father of W. T. Cunningham and Charles Milton Cunningham and grandfather of W. Peyton Cunningham
  - W. T. Cunningham (1871–1952), planter, lawyer, state court judge, and state representative in Natchitoches, Louisiana, son of Milton Joseph Cunningham, brother of Charles Milton Cunningham, and uncle of W. Petyon Cunningham
  - Charles Milton Cunningham (1877–1936), lawyer in Natchitoches, Louisiana, publisher of The Natchitoches times 1903 to 1930, Louisiana state senator from Natchitoches Parish 1915–22, son of Milton Joseph Cunningham, brother of W. T. Cunningham, brother-in-law of John William Payne, and father of W. Peyton Cunningham
  - John William Payne (1877–1933), sheriff of Natchitoches Parish, 1901–33, succeeded as sheriff by son William "Bill" Payne; brother-in-law of Charles Milton Cunningham and uncle of W. Peyton Cunningham
    - W. Peyton Cunningham (1901–1971), lawyer in Natchitoches, Louisiana, member of the Louisiana House of Representatives 1932 to 1940, son of Charles Milton Cunningham, nephew of W. T. Cunningham and John William Payne, and grandson of Milton Joseph Cunningham
    - Myrtis Methvin (1895–1977), first woman to serve as mayor of Castor in Bienville Parish; second woman mayor in Louisiana history, mother of DeWitt T. Methvin Jr., grandmother of Mildred Methvin
      - DeWitt T. Methvin Jr. (1924–2005), Alexandria lawyer and first chairman of the Louisiana Board of Ethics for Elected Officials 1972–81, son-in-law of W. Peyton Cunningham, son of Myrtis Gregory Methvin, and father of Mildred Methvin
        - Mildred Methvin (born 1952), retired United States magistrate judge from the Western District of Louisiana, based in Lafayette, 1983 to 2009; interim judge of the Louisiana 27th Judicial District Court in St. Landry Parish, daughter of DeWitt T. Methvin Jr., and granddaughter of Myrtis Methvin and W. Peyton Cunningham

== The Cuomos ==
- Mario Cuomo (1932–2015), unsuccessful candidate for Lieutenant Governor of New York in 1974; appointed New York Secretary of State by Governor Hugh Carey serving 1975–78; unsuccessful candidate in Democratic primary for New York City Mayor in 1977, losing to Ed Koch; unsuccessful Liberal party candidate in general election for New York City Mayor in 1977, again losing to Ed Koch; Lieutenant Governor of New York 1979–82; Governor of New York 1983–94, losing to George Pataki in 1994; keynote speaker at the 1984 Democratic National Convention in San Francisco;
  - Andrew Cuomo (born 1957), US Secretary of Housing and Urban Development 1997–2001; New York State Attorney General, 2007–10; Governor of New York, 2011–2021. Son of Mario Cuomo.

NOTE: Andrew Cuomo is also former son-in-law of U.S. Attorney General Robert F. Kennedy. Chris Cuomo is a journalist who formerly worked at CNN.

== The Curleys ==
- John J. Curley (1873–1944), delegate to the Democratic National Convention 1928, Treasurer of Boston, Massachusetts 1932. Brother of James Michael Curley.
- James Michael Curley (1874–1958), Massachusetts State Representative 1902–03, U.S. Representative from Massachusetts 1911–14 1943–47, Mayor of Boston, Massachusetts 1914–17 1922–25 1930–33 1946–49; candidate for Governor of Massachusetts 1924 1938; delegate to the Democratic National Convention 1928 1936 1940 1944 1948 1952 1956; Governor of Massachusetts 1935–37; candidate for U.S. Senate from Massachusetts 1936; candidate for Mayor of Boston, Massachusetts 1937 1941 1951 1955; Democratic National Committeeman 1941–43 1947. Brother of John J. Curley.

== The Currins ==
- Samuel Thoms Currin, United States Attorney for the Eastern District of North Carolina 1981–1987; North Carolina Superior Court Judge 1987–1990, Chair of the North Carolina Republican Party 1996–1999.
- Margaret Person Currin, United States Attorney for the Eastern District of North Carolina 1988–1993; Wife of Samuel Thomas Currin.
  - Samuel Thomas Currin II (born 1984), North Carolina Superior Court judge 2025–present; son of Samuel and Margaret Currin.

== The Currys ==
- Charles F. Curry (1858–1930), California Assemblyman 1887–88, Clerk of San Francisco, California 1894–98; Clerk of San Francisco County, California 1894–98; California Secretary of State 1899–1910; candidate for Republican nomination for Governor of California 1910; U.S. Representative from California 1913–30. Father of Charles F. Curry Jr.
  - Charles F. Curry Jr. (1893–1972), California State Representative 1919–30, U.S. Representative from California 1931–33. Son of Charles F. Curry.

== The Currys of Louisiana ==
- Robert Houston Curry (1842–1892), South Carolina native and Confederate Army soldier wounded at the Second Battle of Manassas, member of the Louisiana House of Representatives for Bossier Parish, Louisiana, 1888 to 1892, father of Robert H. "Bob" Curry, who was born shortly before his father's death
  - Robert H. "Bob" Curry, member of the Louisiana State Board of Education for Louisiana's 4th congressional district, c. 1954–74; Shreveport resident, son of Robert Houston Curry and Mollie Banks Curry Gray (1862–1958), a descendant of George Washington

== The Curtins, Greggs, and McLanahans ==
- Andrew Gregg (1755–1835), U.S. Representative from Pennsylvania 1791–1807, U.S. Senator from Pennsylvania 1807–13, Pennsylvania Secretary of State 1820–23, candidate for Governor of Pennsylvania 1823. Grandfather of James Xavier McLanahan, Andrew Gregg Curtin, and David McMurtie Gregg.
  - James Xavier McLanahan (1809–1861), Pennsylvania State Senator 1842–44, U.S. Representative from Pennsylvania 1849–53. Grandson of Andrew Gregg.
  - Andrew Gregg Curtin (1817–1894), Pennsylvania Secretary of State, Pennsylvania Superintendent of Public Instruction, Governor of Pennsylvania 1861–67, U.S. Minister to Russia 1869–72, U.S. Representative from Pennsylvania 1881–87. Grandson of Andrew Gregg.
  - David McMurtie Gregg (1833–1916), U.S. Consul to Prague, Austria-Hungary. Grandson of Andrew Gregg.
    - Willard S. Curtin (1905–1996), District Attorney of Bucks County, Pennsylvania 1949–53; Pennsylvania Republican Committeeman 1954–56; U.S. Representative from Pennsylvania 1957–67. Great-grandnephew of Andrew Gregg Curtin.

== The Curtises and Lows ==
- Benjamin Robbins Curtis (1809–1874), Associate Justice of the Supreme Court of the United States 1851–57.
  - Seth Low (1850–1916), Mayor of Brooklyn 1882–85, Mayor of New York City 1902–03. Son-in-law of Benjamin Robbins Curtis.

== The Cushings and Wildes ==
- Samuel Wilde, Justice of the Massachusetts Supreme Court. Father-in-law of Caleb Cushing.
  - Caleb Cushing (1800–1879), Massachusetts State Representative 1825 1828 1833–34 1847 1858–59 1862–63, Massachusetts State Senator 1826, U.S. Representative from Massachusetts 1835–43, U.S. Minister to China 1843–45, candidate for Governor of Massachusetts 1847 1848, Mayor of Newburyport, Massachusetts 1851–52; Justice of the Massachusetts Supreme Court 1853; U.S. Attorney General 1853–57; delegate to the Democratic National Convention 1860; U.S. Minister to Spain 1874–77. Son-in-law of Samuel Wilde.

== The Cuthberts ==
- Alfred Cuthbert (1785–1856), Georgia State Representative 1810–13, U.S. Representative from Georgia 1813–16 1821–27, U.S. Representative from Georgia 1835–43. Brother of John Alfred Cuthbert.
- John Alfred Cuthbert (1788–1881), Georgia State Representative 1811 1813 1817 1822, Georgia State Senator 1814–15, U.S. Representative from Georgia 1819–21. Brother of Alfred Cuthbert.

== The Cuylers and Lows ==
- Abraham Cuyler, Mayor of Albany, New York 1770–76. Father-in-law of Isaac Low.
  - Isaac Low (1735–1791), Delegate to the Continental Congress from New York Colony 1774. Son-in-law of Abraham C. Cuyler.

NOTE: Abraham Cuyler was also son-in-law Albany, New York Mayor Jan Jansen Bleecker and brother-in-law of Albany, New York Mayors John Bleecker and Rutger Bleecker. Isaac Low was also brother of New York Assemblyman Nicholas Low.
