= Thomas Delahanty (disambiguation) =

Thomas Delahanty (born c. 1935) is an American retired police officer wounded during the attempted assassination of President Ronald Reagan.

Thomas Delahanty also refers to:

- Thomas E. Delahanty (1914–1985), justice of the Maine Supreme Judicial Court
- Thomas E. Delahanty II (1945–2021), United States attorney for the District of Maine
- Tom Delahanty (Thomas James Delahanty; 1872–1951), American baseball player
