= List of United States federal courthouses in Maine =

Following is a list of current and former courthouses of the United States federal court system located in Maine. Each entry indicates the name of the building along with an image, if available, its location and the jurisdiction it covers, the dates during which it was used for each such jurisdiction, and, if applicable the person for whom it was named, and the date of renaming. Dates of use will not necessarily correspond with the dates of construction or demolition of a building, as pre-existing structures may be adapted or court use, and former court buildings may later be put to other uses. Also, the official name of the building may be changed at some point after its use as a federal court building has been initiated.

== Courthouses ==
Courthouse	City	Image	Street address	Jurisdiction	Dates of use	Named for
Olde Federal Building†	Augusta		295 Water Street	D. Maine	1886–? Still houses a Post Office	n/a
U.S. Custom House and Post Office	Bangor		Central Street Bridge & State Street	D. Maine	1855–1911; Destroyed in the Great Fire of 1911.	n/a
U.S. Post Office	Bangor		73 Harlow Street	D. Maine	1915–1968; Currently in use as Bangor City Hall.	n/a
Margaret Chase Smith Federal Building and United States Courthouse	Bangor		202 Harlow Street	D. Maine	1968–present	Senator Margaret Chase Smith
U.S. Court House and Post Office	Portland	U.S. Custom House, Portland, ME - 1873-1905	Middle & Exchange Sts.	D. Maine	1873–1905; Razed in 1965	n/a
Edward T. Gignoux United States Courthouse†	Portland		156 Federal Street	D. Maine	1911–present	District Court judge Edward Thaxter Gignoux

== Key ==
^{†}	Listed on the National Register of Historic Places (NRHP)
^{††}	NRHP-listed and also designated as a National Historic Landmark
