= Portland Pipe Line Corp. v. City of South Portland =

Portland Pipe Line Corporation v. City of South Portland
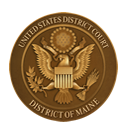
- Seal of the United States District Court for the District of Maine
- Court: United States District Court for the District of Maine
- Full case name: Portland Pipe Line Corporation et al. v. City of South Portland et al.
- Decided: August 24, 2018

Court membership
- Judge sitting: John A. Woodcock Jr.

Portland Pipe Line Corp. v. City of South Portland is a lawsuit filed on February 6, 2015, in the United States District Court for the District of Maine. It involved a pipeline operator's challenge to South Portland, Maine's local ordinance prohibiting loading crude oil onto tankers and the construction of new structures for that purpose on the grounds that it violates the Dormant Commerce Clause and Foreign Commerce Clause of the United States Constitution.

== Decision ==
After a four-day bench trial, the court ruled on August 24, 2018, that the local ordinance does not violate the Dormant Commerce Clause or the Foreign Commerce Clause of the United States Constitution.

The federal district court for the District of Maine ruled that the City of South Portland's ordinance prohibiting the loading of crude oil onto tankers and related activities and structures did not violate the Dormant Commerce Clause or the Foreign Commerce Clause. The ordinance, known as the "Clean Skies Ordinance," was adopted after a pipeline operator (the plaintiff in this case) made plans to reverse the flow in a pipeline that extended from the harbor in South Portland to refineries in Quebec so that instead of transporting crude oil from the harbor to the refineries, the pipeline could transport crude oil from Canada to the harbor for shipment. Concerns regarding local pollution and other local impacts were raised in response to these plans, as well as concerns regarding climate change. The Clear Skies Ordinance's stated purposes are to "encourage the most appropriate use of land throughout the municipality"; "to protect citizens and visitors from harmful effects caused by air pollutants"; "to promote a wholesome home environment"; and "to conserve natural resources."

The district court found that the ordinance did not regulate extraterritorially even if it had effects on the functions of the pipeline company's infrastructure outside the city. The court was not persuaded by the pipeline operator's arguments that the ordinance had an "extraterritorial purpose," including arguments that members of the public had cited the pipeline's potential impacts outside the city, including concerns about continued reliance on fossil fuels causing global climate change. The court said the "vast majority" of evidence regarding support of the ordinance focused on local impacts and that "[c]ourts have upheld other statutes more clearly motivated by extraterritorial concerns, as long as the regulatory effect did not control out-of-state transactions."

The court also found that the ordinance did not discriminate against interstate or foreign commerce on its face or in practical effect and that the operator had not shown that the primary purpose of the ordinance was to discriminate against such commerce. In making this finding, the court noted that while several members of the City Council had "expressed their desire to see reduced reliance on fossil fuels in the economy in general through more renewables," they "also disclaimed an ability to accomplish that goal with an ordinance ... and focused their comments on the developmental impacts within South Portland." The court also found that the ordinance did not impose burdens on foreign or interstate commerce that were clearly excessive in relation to the putative local benefit. Finally, the court found that the ordinance did not impermissibly interfere with the federal government's ability to speak with "one voice" when regulating commerce with foreign governments.

== See also ==
- Climate change in the United States
