= Judge Levy =

Judge Levy may refer to:

- Jon D. Levy (born 1954), judge of the United States District Court for the District of Maine
- Judith E. Levy (born 1958), judge of the United States District Court for the Eastern District of Michigan

== See also ==
- David F. Levi (born 1951), judge of the United States District Court for the Eastern District of California
- Judge Leavy (disambiguation)
