= Justice Fox =

Justice Fox may refer to:

- Charles N. Fox (1829–1904), associate justice of the Supreme Court of California
- Cyril J. Fox (1889–1946), justice of the Newfoundland Supreme Court
- Edward Fox (judge) (1815–1881), associate justice of the Supreme Court of Maine
- Fred L. Fox (1876–1952), associate justice of the Supreme Court of Appeals of West Virginia
- James David Fox (1847–1910), associate justice of the Supreme Court of Missouri
- Kate M. Fox (born 1955), associate justice of the Wyoming Supreme Court

== See also ==
- Judge Fox (disambiguation)
