= List of first women lawyers and judges in Maine =

This is a list of the first women lawyer(s) and judge(s) in Maine. It includes the year in which the women were admitted to practice law (in parentheses). Also included are women who achieved other distinctions such becoming the first in their state to graduate from law school or become a political figure.

== Firsts in state history ==
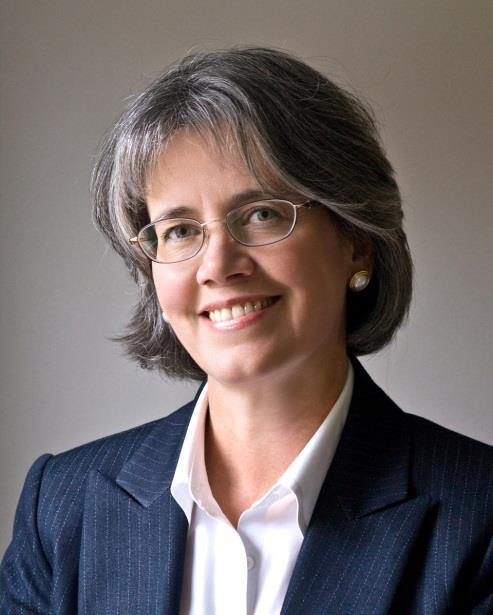
Nancy Torresen: First female appointed as a Judge of the U.S. District Court for the District of Maine (2011)

=== Law School ===
- First female law graduate: Velma Peabody in 1938

=== Lawyers ===
- First female: Clara Hapgood Nash (1872)
- First female (employed by Maine legislature): Gail Laughlin in 1913
- First female to argue case before Law Court: Alice Parker in 1932
- First female prosecutor: Suzanne E.K. Smith in 1972
- First Penobscot female: Jill E. Tompkins (1989)
- First Passamaquoddy female: Tina M. Farrenkopf (1997)
- First Wabanaki female: Sherri Mitchell:

=== State judges ===
- First female (district court): Harriet Henry in 1973
- First female (superior court): Jessie Briggs Gunther in 1976
- First female (law court Maine Supreme Judicial Court): Caroline Duby Glassman in 1983 for the latter court
- First female (Chief Justice; Maine Supreme Judicial Court): Leigh Saufley in 2001

=== Federal judges ===
- First female (federal judge): Margaret “Peggy” Kravchuk
- First female (U.S. District Court for the District of Maine): Nancy Torresen (1987) in 2011

=== Attorney General of Maine ===
- First female: Janet Mills (c. 1976) in 2008

=== Deputy Attorney General ===
- First female (Chief Deputy Attorney General of Maine): Vendean Vafiades

=== District Attorney ===
- First female: Janet Mills (c. 1976) in 1980

=== Political Office ===
- First female (Governor of Maine): Janet Mills (c. 1976) in 2018
- First Latino American female (Deputy Secretary of State for Maine): Joann Bautista in 2021

=== United States Attorney ===
- First female (interim): Paula D. Silsby in 2001
- First female (permanent): Darcie N. McElwee in 2021

=== Maine State Bar Association ===
- First female president: Phyllis Givertz (1974) in 1983
- First Asian American (female) president: Susan Faunce in 2025

== Firsts in local history ==
- Janet Mills (c. 1976): First female to serve as a District Attorney in Androscoggin, Franklin and Oxford Counties, Maine (1980)
- Natasha Irving: First female District Attorney for Knox, Lincoln, Sagadahoc and Waldo Counties, Maine (2019)
- Jessie Briggs Gunther: First female to serve as a Judge of the Androscoggin County Superior Court, Maine
- Adeline Bond Rines (1914): First female lawyer in Cumberland County, Maine
- Sigrid E. Tompkins: First female to serve as the President of the Cumberland County Bar Association, Maine (1974)
- Stephanie Anderson: First female District Attorney for Cumberland County, Maine
- Paula Sawyer: First female to graduate from the University of Maine School of Law (1968) [Cumberland County, Maine]
- Agnes Robinson (1900): First female lawyer in Franklin County, Maine
- Iola S. Kearney (1920): First female lawyer in Augusta, Maine [Kennebec County, Maine]
- Shirley Cogswell: First female to serve as the Chief Justice of the Pleasant Point – Passamaquoddy Tribal Court (1980) [Washington County, Maine]

== See also ==
- List of first women lawyers and judges in the United States
- Timeline of women lawyers in the United States
- Women in law

== Other topics of interest ==
- List of first minority male lawyers and judges in the United States
- List of first minority male lawyers and judges in Maine
