= Judge Fox =

Judge Fox may refer to:

- Edward Fox (judge) (1815–1881), judge of the United States District Court for the District of Maine
- James Carroll Fox (1928–2019), judge of the United States District Court for the Eastern District of North Carolina
- Noel Peter Fox (1910–1987), judge of the United States District Court for the Western District of Michigan

== See also ==
- Justice Fox (disambiguation)
