= Jeffrey Hjelm =

American judge (born 1955)

Associate Justice of the Maine Supreme Judicial Court
- In office August 1, 2014 – December 2019
- Appointed by: Paul LePage
- Preceded by: Jon D. Levy
- Succeeded by: Catherine Connors

Personal details
- Born: September 30, 1955 (age 69)
- Education: Hamilton College (BA); Case Western Reserve University (JD)

Jeffrey L. Hjelm (born September 30, 1955) is an American lawyer who served as an associate justice of the Maine Supreme Judicial Court from 2014 to 2019.

== Education ==
Hjelm is a graduate of Hampden Academy. He received a Bachelor of Arts from Hamilton College in 1977 and a Juris Doctor from Case Western Reserve University School of Law in 1980.

== Judicial career ==
Hjelm was appointed to the Maine District Court in 1992 and to the Maine Superior Court in 1998. He was reappointed to the Superior Court in 2005 and 2012. On May 7, 2014, Hjelm was nominated by Paul LePage to be an associate justice of the Maine Supreme Judicial Court. On August 1, 2014, Hjelm was sworn in by Governor Paul LePage as an associate justice. On September 20, 2019, Hjelm announced his intention to retire upon the confirmation of his successor. He retired in December 2019. He was later sworn in as an Active Retired Justice of the Maine Supreme Judicial Court.

Legal offices
Preceded by Jon D. Levy	Associate Justice of the Maine Supreme Judicial Court; 2014–2019	Succeeded by Catherine Connors
