= Morton A. Brody Distinguished Judicial Service Award =

- Awarded for: United States federal or state judge who embodies the qualities of integrity, compassion, humanity, and judicial craftsmanship.
- Country: USA
- Presented by: Colby College
- First award: 2001
- Website: Official website

The Morton A. Brody Distinguished Judicial Service Award is presented annually by Colby College to a United States federal or state judge who embodies the qualities of integrity, compassion, humanity, and judicial craftsmanship. The award is named for Morton A. Brody and was established in 2000 at the request of the Brody family. It is conferred biennially, except for 2001 and 2002.

== Recipients ==
Year	Recipient	Reference
2001	Guido Calabresi	
2002	Ann Claire Williams	
2004	Richard S. Arnold	
2006	Frank M. Coffin	
2008	Leonie Brinkema	
2010	Nancy Gertner	
2012	Wallace B. Jefferson	
2014	D. Brock Hornby	
2016	Tani Gorre Cantil-Sakauye	
2018	Anita B. Brody	
2022	Patti B. Saris	
2024	Esther Salas	
