= Nancy Torresen =

American judge (born 1959)

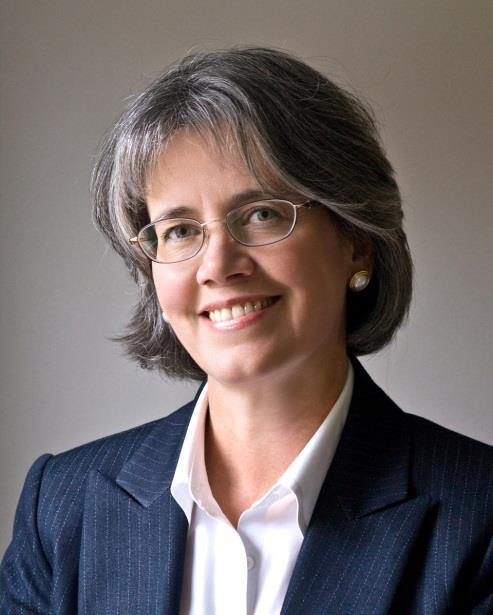

Senior Judge of the United States District Court for the District of Maine
- Incumbent
- Assumed office October 11, 2025

Chief Judge of the United States District Court for the District of Maine
- In office January 6, 2015 – December 31, 2018
- Preceded by: John A. Woodcock Jr.
- Succeeded by: Jon D. Levy

Judge of the United States District Court for the District of Maine
- In office October 4, 2011 – October 11, 2025
- Appointed by: Barack Obama
- Preceded by: D. Brock Hornby
- Succeeded by: vacant

Personal details
- Born: 1959 (age 66–67) Ridgewood, New Jersey, U.S.
- Education: Hope College (BA); University of Michigan (JD)

Nancy Torresen (born 1959) is a senior United States district judge of the United States District Court for the District of Maine. She is the first female judge to serve in the District of Maine.

== Early life and education ==
Torresen received a Bachelor of Arts from Hope College in Holland, Michigan in 1981 and a Juris Doctor from the University of Michigan Law School in 1987.

== Career ==
Torresen worked as a law clerk for then-District Judge Conrad K. Cyr of the United States District Court for the District of Maine from 1987 to 1988. Between the years 1988 to 1990, Torresen worked at the law firm of Williams & Connolly, where she was based in Washington, D.C. In 1990, Torresen joined the United States Attorney's Office in Maine, where she handled civil actions involving United States federal agencies. Between 1994 and 2001, Torresen worked for the appellate section of the criminal division of the Maine Attorney General’s Office, where she was responsible for representing the state of Maine in appeals of serious violent crime convictions. From 2001 until becoming a federal judge in 2011, she worked in the United States Attorney’s Office in Bangor and focused on investigating and prosecuting various federal crimes.

=== Federal judicial service ===
Torresen was nominated to fill the seat of Judge D. Brock Hornby by President Barack Obama on March 2, 2011. Torresen is the first woman to serve as a federal judge in Maine. The United States Senate confirmed Torresen on October 3, 2011. She received her judicial commission on October 4, 2011. She became Chief Judge on January 6, 2015. She ended her term as Chief Judge on December 31, 2018. She assumed senior status on October 11, 2025.

== See also ==
- List of first women lawyers and judges in Maine

Legal offices
| Preceded by D. Brock Hornby | Judge of the United States District Court for the District of Maine; 2011–2025 | Vacant |
| Preceded by John A. Woodcock Jr. | Chief Judge of the United States District Court for the District of Maine; 2015–2018 | Succeeded by Jon D. Levy |
