= Judge Ware =

Judge Ware may refer to:

- Ashur Ware (1782–1873), judge of the United States District Court for the District of Maine
- James Ware (judge) (born 1946), judge of the United States District Court for the Northern District of California
- Martha Ware (1917–2009), judge of the Plymouth County, Massachusetts district court
- Onzlee Ware (born 1954), judge of the Roanoke County, Virginia, Juvenile and Domestic Relations District Court
- Orie Solomon Ware (1882–1974), judge of the Kentucky circuit court
