= Frank M. Coffin =

American judge (1919–2009)

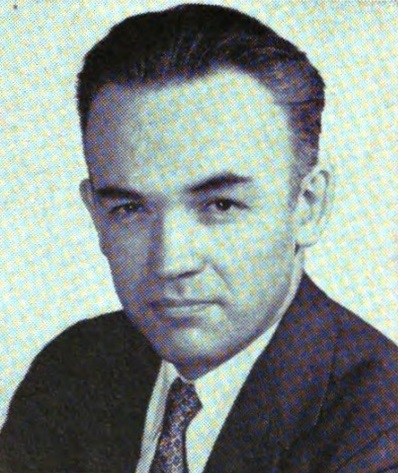

Senior Judge of the United States Court of Appeals for the First Circuit
- In office February 1, 1989 – December 7, 2009

Chief Judge of the United States Court of Appeals for the First Circuit
- In office 1972–1983
- Preceded by: Bailey Aldrich
- Succeeded by: Levin H. Campbell

Judge of the United States Court of Appeals for the First Circuit
- In office October 2, 1965 – February 1, 1989
- Appointed by: Lyndon B. Johnson
- Preceded by: John Patrick Hartigan
- Succeeded by: Conrad K. Cyr

Member of the U.S. House of Representatives from Maine's 2nd district
- In office January 3, 1957 – January 3, 1961
- Preceded by: Charles P. Nelson
- Succeeded by: Stanley R. Tupper

Personal details
- Born: Frank Morey Coffin; July 11, 1919 Lewiston, Maine, U.S.
- Died: December 7, 2009 (aged 90) Portland, Maine, U.S.
- Party: Democratic
- Education: Bates College (AB); Harvard University (IA, LLB)

Frank Morey Coffin (July 11, 1919 – December 7, 2009) was an American politician and judge from Maine who served as a United States circuit judge of the United States Court of Appeals for the First Circuit.

== Education and career ==
Born on July 11, 1919, in Lewiston, Maine, Coffin received an Artium Baccalaureus degree in 1940 from Bates College. He completed graduate instruction in Industrial Administration in 1943 from Harvard Business School and a Bachelor of Laws in 1947 from Harvard Law School. He was a lieutenant in the United States Navy from 1943 to 1946. He was a law clerk for Judge John David Clifford Jr. of the United States District Court for the District of Maine from 1947 to 1949. He was corporation counsel for Lewiston from 1949 to 1952. He was in private practice in Lewiston from 1946 to 1953. He was in private practice in Portland, Maine from 1953 to 1956. He was a United States representative from Maine from 1957 to 1961. He was the Managing Director of the Development Loan Fund in 1961. He was the Deputy Administrator of the United States Agency for International Development from 1961 to 1964. He was United States Representative to the development assistance committee of the Organisation for Economic Co-Operation and Development from 1964 to 1965.

== Political career ==
Coffin served as chairman of the Maine Democratic state committee from 1954 to 1956 and was elected as a Democrat to the United States House of Representatives in 1956. He was elected to the 85th and 86th Congresses, serving from January 3, 1957, until January 3, 1961. He did not seek re-election in the 1960 election, choosing instead to embark on an unsuccessful campaign for Governor of Maine. He would be defeated in the 1960 Maine gubernatorial special election by Republican incumbent John H. Reed.

== Federal judicial service ==
Coffin was nominated by President Lyndon B. Johnson on September 15, 1965, to a seat on the United States Court of Appeals for the First Circuit vacated by Judge John Patrick Hartigan. He was confirmed by the United States Senate on October 1, 1965, and received his commission on October 2, 1965. He served as a board member of the Federal Judicial Center from 1971 to 1972. He was a member of the Judicial Conference of the United States from 1972 to 1983. He served as Chief Judge from 1972 to 1983. He assumed senior status on February 1, 1989. He took inactive senior status in the fall of 2006. His service terminated on December 7, 2009, due to his death.

== Death ==
Coffin died on December 7, 2009, at Maine Medical Center in Portland from complications following surgery to repair an aortic aneurysm.

== Publications ==
Coffin is the author of four books: Witness for AID (Houghton Mifflin 1964); The Ways of a Judge: Views from the Federal Appellate Bench (Houghton Mifflin 1980); A Lexicon of Oral Advocacy (National Institute of Trial Advocacy 1985); On Appeal: Courts, Lawyering and Judging (W.W. Norton 1994).

== See also ==
- List of United States federal judges by longevity of service

== Sources ==
- United States Congress. "Frank M. Coffin (id: C000589)". Biographical Directory of the United States Congress.; retrieved February 6, 2008.
- Frank Morey Coffin at the Biographical Directory of Federal Judges, a publication of the Federal Judicial Center.

Party political offices
Preceded by Clinton Clauson	Democratic nominee for Governor of Maine; 1960	Succeeded by Maynard Dolloff
U.S. House of Representatives
Preceded by Charles P. Nelson	Member of the U.S. House of Representatives from Maine's 2nd congressional district 1957–1961	Succeeded by Stanley R. Tupper
Legal offices
Preceded by John Patrick Hartigan	Judge of the United States Court of Appeals for the First Circuit; 1965–1989	Succeeded by Conrad K. Cyr
Preceded by Bailey Aldrich	Chief Judge of the United States Court of Appeals for the First Circuit; 1972–1983	Succeeded by Levin H. Campbell
