= Judge Hale =

Judge Hale may refer to:

- Clarence Hale (1848–1934), judge of the United States District Court for the District of Maine
- David J. Hale (born 1967), judge of the United States District Court for the Western District of Kentucky
