= Judge Brody =

Judge Brody may refer to:

- Anita B. Brody (born 1935), judge of the United States District Court for the Eastern District of Pennsylvania
- Morton A. Brody (1933–2000), judge of the United States District Court for the District of Maine

== See also ==
- Margo Kitsy Brodie (born 1966), judge of the United States District Court for the Eastern District of New York
