= Gene Carter =

American judge (1935–2021)

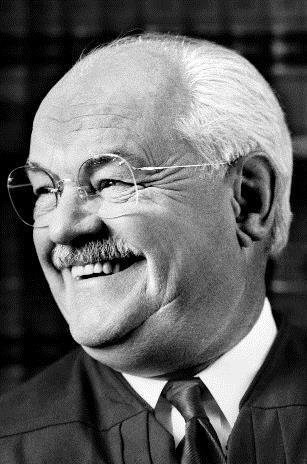

Senior Judge of the United States District Court for the District of Maine
- In office January 2, 2003 – November 17, 2021

Chief Judge of the United States District Court for the District of Maine
- In office 1989–1996
- Preceded by: Conrad K. Cyr
- Succeeded by: D. Brock Hornby

Judge of the United States District Court for the District of Maine
- In office June 23, 1983 – January 2, 2003
- Appointed by: Ronald Reagan
- Preceded by: Edward Thaxter Gignoux
- Succeeded by: John A. Woodcock Jr.

Personal details
- Born: Gene Carter; November 1, 1935 Milbridge, Maine, U.S.
- Died: November 17, 2021 (aged 86) Hampden, Maine, U.S.
- Education: University of Maine (B.A.); New York University School of Law (LL.B.)

Gene Carter (November 1, 1935 – November 17, 2021) was a United States district judge of the United States District Court for the District of Maine.

== Education and career ==
Born in Milbridge, Maine, Carter received a Bachelor of Arts degree from the University of Maine in 1958 and a Bachelor of Laws from New York University School of Law in 1961. He was a law clerk to Judge J. Spencer Bell of the United States Court of Appeals for the Fourth Circuit from 1961 to 1962, and was then in the United States Army Reserve, JAG Corps, from 1962 to 1968, achieving the rank of captain. Carter entered private practice in Bangor, Maine in 1965, remaining in practice until 1980, when he became an associate justice of the Maine Supreme Judicial Court from 1980 to 1983.

Carter died on November 17, 2021.

== Federal judicial service ==
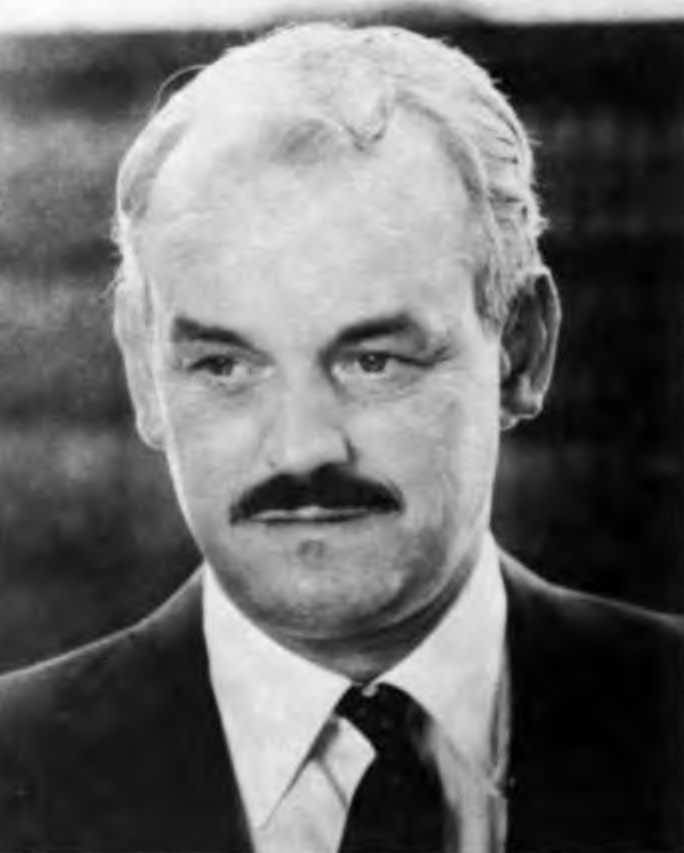
Carter in the 1980s.

On May 26, 1983, Carter was nominated by President Ronald Reagan to a seat on the United States District Court for the District of Maine vacated by Judge Edward Thaxter Gignoux. Carter was confirmed by the United States Senate on June 22, 1983, and received his commission on June 23, 1983. He served as Chief Judge from 1989 to 1996. He assumed senior status on January 2, 2003.

== Ethics controversy ==
In 1995, Carter was charged with an ethical violation involving allegations of dishonesty and favoritism in handling a civil matter. Judge Juan R. Torruella, then Chief Judge of the United States Court of Appeals for the First Circuit, required Carter to explain his actions. Carter issued a 21-page statement attempting to justify his actions. Ultimately, Carter was found to have used poor judgement and acted inappropriately in the matter, but did not commit an ethics violation and was not sanctioned.

== Sources ==
Legal offices
Preceded by Edward Thaxter Gignoux	Judge of the United States District Court for the District of Maine; 1983–2003	Succeeded by John A. Woodcock Jr.
Preceded by Conrad K. Cyr	Chief Judge of the United States District Court for the District of Maine; 1989–1996	Succeeded by D. Brock Hornby
