= Elmer Samuel Hosmer =

American composer & teacher (1862–1945)

Elmer Samuel Hosmer (1862 – 1945) was an American composer. A native of Massachusetts, he studied with J. C. D. Parker and Percy Goetschius, and wrote a good deal of church music. He also composed a number of cantatas, including one about Christopher Columbus (Columbus: A Short Cantata for Men's Voices) and one after "The Man Without a Country". He set a poem by Clara Hapgood Nash, "Mother", to music as a song.

He taught music at the Rhode Island College of Education in Providence, for some years starting in 1924.
