= William Bayard Shields =

American judge (1780–1823)

Judge of the United States District Court for the District of Mississippi
- In office April 20, 1818 – April 18, 1823
- Appointed by: James Monroe
- Preceded by: Seat established by 3 Stat. 413
- Succeeded by: Peter Randolph

Personal details
- Born: William Bayard Shields; 1780 Maryland
- Died: April 18, 1823 (aged 42–43) Natchez, Mississippi
- Education: read law

William Bayard Shields (1780 – April 18, 1823) was a United States district judge of the United States District Court for the District of Mississippi.

== Education and career ==
Born in 1780, in Maryland, Shields read law with Caesar Augustus Rodney. He entered private practice in Wilmington, Delaware until 1802. He was Secretary of State of Delaware in 1802. He resumed private practice in Natchez, Mississippi Territory (State of Mississippi from December 10, 1817) from 1803 to 1809, until 1812, and from 1814 to 1817. He was a United States agent to adjust land claims west of the Pearl River in 1804. He was a member of the Territorial Legislature of the Mississippi Territory from 1808 to 1809, and from 1813 to 1814. He was Attorney General of the Mississippi Territory starting in 1809. He was a Judge of the Superior Court of Mississippi and a Justice of the Supreme Court of Mississippi from 1817 to 1818.

As of 1812 he was a director of the Bank of Mississippi, capitalized at $500,000, along with Stephen Minor, Ferdinand Claiborne, Samuel Postlethwaite, Wm. Brooks, John Hankerson, Lyman Harding, Wm. G. Forman, Jeremiah Hunt, Lewis Evans, Jas. McIntosh, Thos. Wilkins, and Jas. C. Wilkins.

== Federal judicial service ==
Shields was nominated by President James Monroe on April 20, 1818, to the United States District Court for the District of Mississippi, to a new seat authorized by 3 Stat. 413. He was confirmed by the United States Senate on April 20, 1818, and received commission the same day. His service terminated on April 18, 1823, (Note: There is some ambiguity in sources regarding his date of death. His Federal Judicial Center biography gives his death date as April 19 at one point in the article, but later gives it as April 18. Other sources are ambiguous and conflicting as to whether the date is April 18 or April 19, but April 18 is slightly more prevalent.) due to his death in Natchez.

== Circumstances of his death ==
Shields obituary in the Natchez Gazette of April 23, 1823, describes his last days and death thus; "On the morning of the 16th inst. he had a severe attack of Apoplexy, which was followed by a severe derangement of his mind which continued in violent paroxyms, with intervals of apparent rationality, until the evening of the 18th when in a most agonizing exacerbation he relieved himself of sufferance by suddenly terminating his existence." (Note: Spelling and capitalization errors present in the original quote.)

== See also ==
- List of justices of the Supreme Court of Mississippi

== Sources ==
Legal offices
Preceded by Seat established by 3 Stat. 413	Judge of the United States District Court for the District of Mississippi; 1818–1823	Succeeded by Peter Randolph
Preceded by Newly established seat	Justice of the Supreme Court of Mississippi; 1817–1818	Succeeded by Joshua G. Clarke
