= List of federal judges appointed by James Monroe =

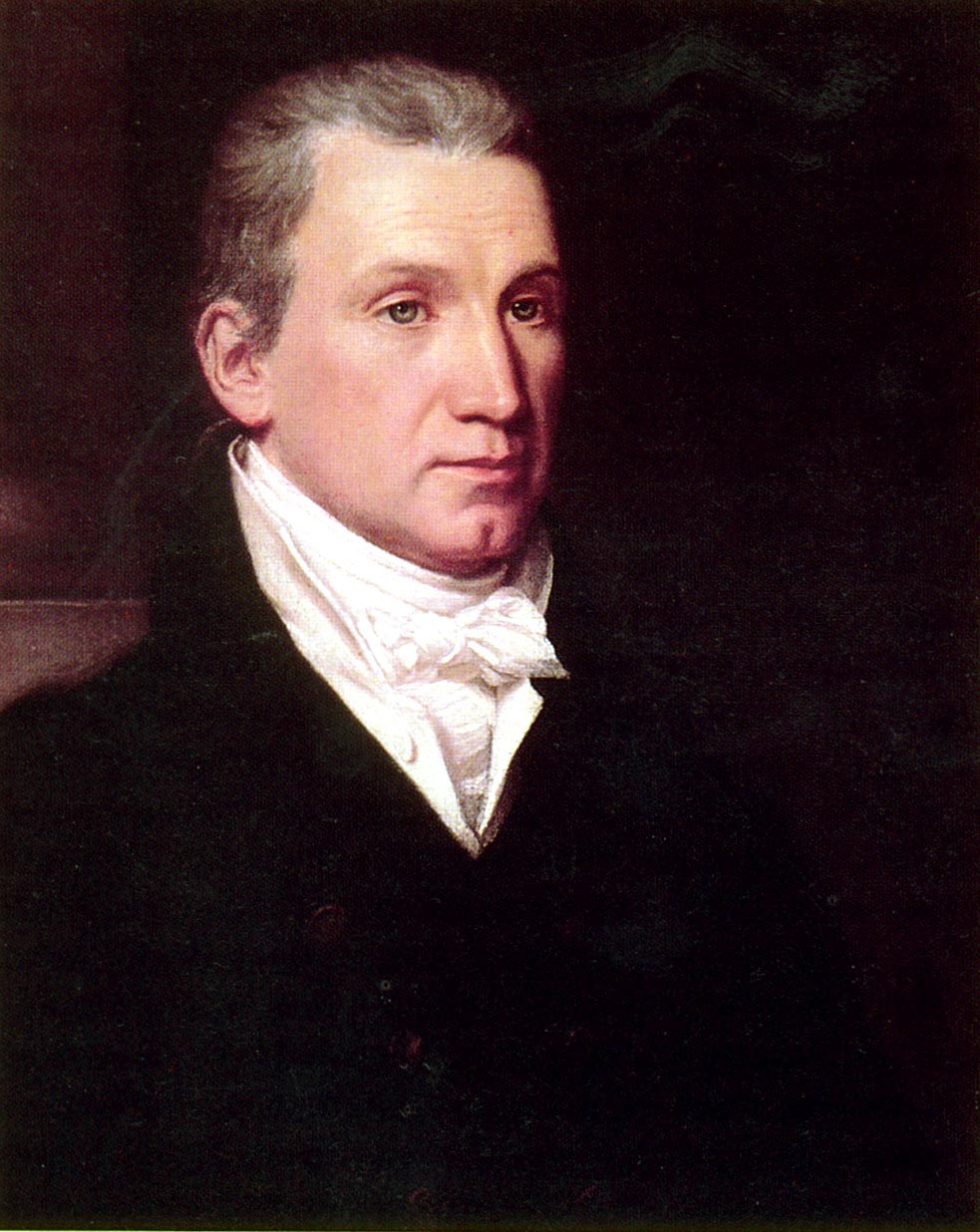
President James Monroe.

Following is a list of all Article III United States federal judges appointed by President James Monroe during his presidency. In total Monroe appointed 22 Article III federal judges, including 1 Justice to the Supreme Court of the United States and 21 judges to the United States district courts.

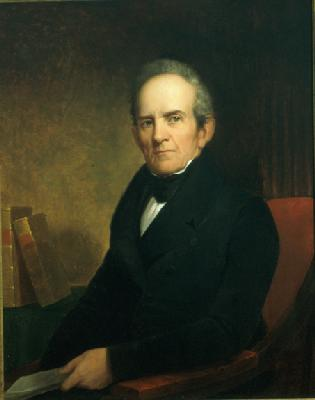
Monroe appointed Smith Thompson to the Supreme Court.

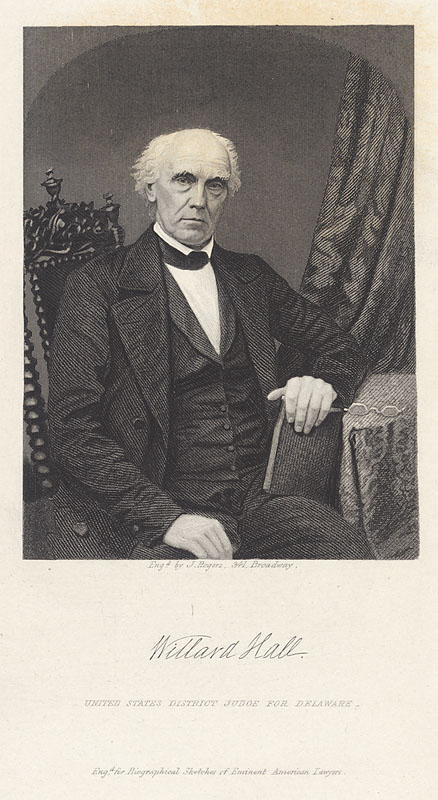
Willard Hall was appointed by Monroe to the District of Delaware, and continued serving on the court for forty years after Monroe's death.

== United States Supreme Court justices ==
#	Justice	Seat	State	Former justice	Nomination date	Confirmation date	Began active service	Ended active service
1	Smith Thompson	1	New York	Henry Brockholst Livingston	December 5, 1823	December 9, 1823	September 1, 1823	December 18, 1843

== District courts ==
#	Judge	Court (Note: See List of United States district and territorial courts)	Nomination date	Confirmation date	Began active service	Ended active service
1	Benjamin Parke	D. Ind.	March 5, 1817 (Note: Previously nominated by President Madison on January 28, 1817. That nomination expired at the end of the term. Renominated on March 5, 1817 by President Monroe.)	March 5, 1817	March 6, 1817	July 12, 1835
2	Albion Parris	D. Me.	January 27, 1818	January 28, 1818	January 28, 1818	January 1, 1822
3	William Bayard Shields	D. Miss.	April 20, 1818	April 20, 1818	April 20, 1818	April 18, 1823
4	Jonathan Hoge Walker	W.D. Pa.	April 20, 1818	April 20, 1818	April 20, 1818	March 23, 1824
5	William Davies	D. Ga.	January 11, 1819	January 11, 1819	January 14, 1819	March 9, 1821
6	John G. Jackson	W.D. Va.	February 20, 1819	February 24, 1819	February 24, 1819	March 28, 1825
7	Nathaniel Pope	D. Ill.	March 3, 1819	March 3, 1819	March 3, 1819	January 23, 1850
8	Theodorick Bland	D. Md.	January 3, 1820	January 5, 1820	November 23, 1819	August 16, 1824
9	Roger Skinner	N.D.N.Y.	January 3, 1820	January 5, 1820	November 24, 1819	August 19, 1825
10	Charles Tait	D. Ala.	May 10, 1820	May 13, 1820	May 13, 1820	February 1, 1826
11	John Dick	D. La.	March 1, 1821	March 2, 1821	March 2, 1821	April 23, 1824
12	Jeremiah La Touche Cuyler	D. Ga.	December 19, 1821	January 10, 1822	June 12, 1821	May 7, 1839
13	Ashur Ware	D. Me.	February 15, 1822	February 15, 1822	February 15, 1822	May 31, 1866
14	James H. Peck	D. Mo.	March 26, 1822	April 5, 1822	April 5, 1822	April 29, 1836
15	Thomas Lee	D.S.C.	February 7, 1823	February 17, 1823	February 17, 1823	October 24, 1839
16	Willard Hall	D. Del.	December 5, 1823	December 9, 1823	May 6, 1823	December 6, 1871
17	Peter Randolph	D. Miss.	December 5, 1823	December 9, 1823	June 25, 1823	January 30, 1832
18	William Wilkins	W.D. Pa.	May 10, 1824	May 12, 1824	May 12, 1824	April 14, 1831
19	Thomas B. Robertson	E.D. La. W.D. La.	May 24, 1824	May 26, 1824	May 26, 1824	October 5, 1828
20	John Pitman	D.R.I.	December 16, 1824	January 3, 1825	August 4, 1824	November 17, 1864
21	Elias Glenn	D. Md.	December 16, 1824	January 3, 1825	August 31, 1824	April 1, 1836

== Notes ==
Renominations

== Sources ==
- Federal Judicial Center
