= Stacey D. Neumann =

American judge (born 1978)

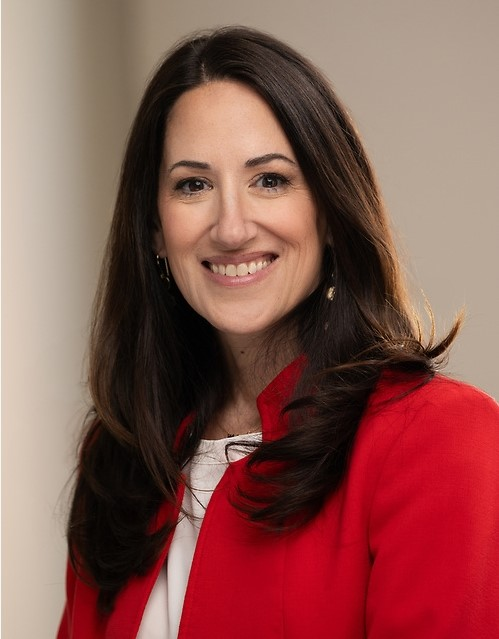

Judge of the United States District Court for the District of Maine
- Incumbent
- Assumed office August 22, 2024
- Appointed by: Joe Biden
- Preceded by: Jon D. Levy

Personal details
- Born: 1978 (age 47–48) Natick, Massachusetts, U.S.
- Education: James Madison University (BA); Cornell University (JD)

Stacey Diane Neumann (born 1978) is an American lawyer who serves as a United States district judge of the United States District Court for the District of Maine.

== Education ==
Neumann received a Bachelor of Arts, magna cum laude, from James Madison University in 2000 and a Juris Doctor, magna cum laude, from Cornell Law School in 2005.

== Career ==
From 2005 to 2006, Neumann was a law clerk to Associate Justice John A. Dooley of the Vermont Supreme Court and from 2006 to 2007, she was a law clerk for Judge Peter W. Hall of the United States Court of Appeals for the Second Circuit. From 2007 to 2009, she was a staff attorney at the Vermont Office of the Defender General in Chittenden County. From 2009 to 2013, Neumann served as a special assistant U.S. attorney and then an assistant U.S. attorney in the U.S. Attorney's Office for the District of Maine. From 2013 to 2024, she worked in private practice at Murray, Plumb & Murray in Portland, where her focus was on employment law; she was a partner with the firm from 2017 to 2024. In 2023, she was named by the United States Sentencing Commission to the Practitioners Advisory Group.

=== Federal judicial service ===
On April 24, 2024, President Joe Biden announced his intent to nominate Neumann to serve as a United States district judge of the United States District Court for the District of Maine. On April 30, 2024, her nomination was sent to the Senate. President Biden nominated Neumann to the seat being vacated by Judge Jon D. Levy, who subsequently assumed senior status on May 6, 2024. On May 22, 2024, a hearing on her nomination was held before the Senate Judiciary Committee. On July 11, 2024, her nomination was reported out of committee by a 13–8 vote. On July 30, 2024, the United States Senate invoked cloture on her nomination by a 50–41 vote. Later that day, her nomination was confirmed by a 50–43 vote. She received her judicial commission on August 22, 2024. She was sworn in on August 26, 2024.

Legal offices
Preceded by Jon D. Levy	Judge of the United States District Court for the District of Maine; 2024–present	Incumbent
