= Pullen Fountain =

Historic public water fountain and horse trough in Portland, Maine

Coordinates: 43°39′33″N 70°15′19″W

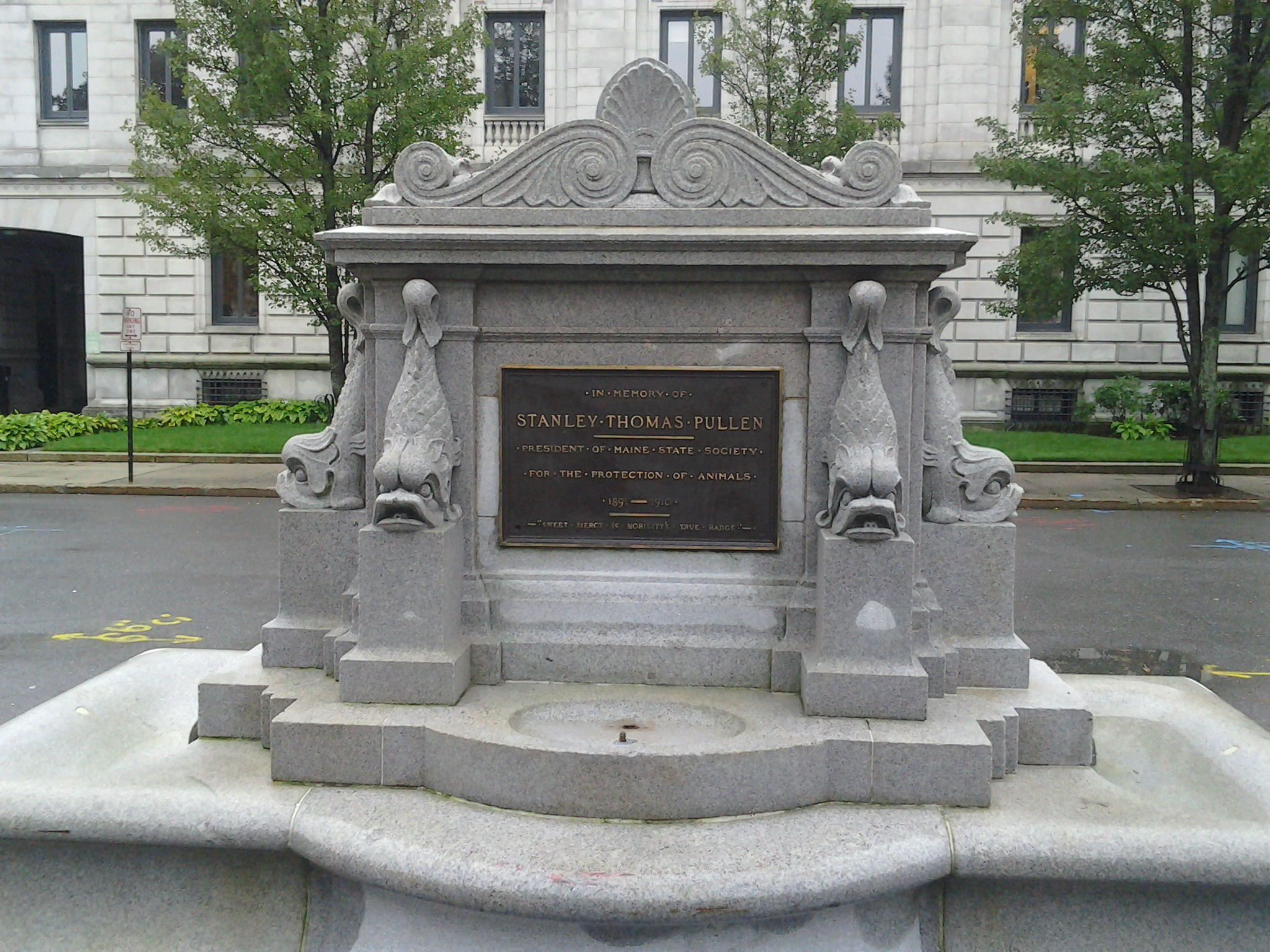
The Pullen Fountain.

Stanley Thomas Pullen Fountain is an historic public water fountain and horse trough in Portland, Maine. It is named for Stanley T. Pullen, a former president of the Maine State Society for the Protection of Animals. Pullen died in 1910; the fountain's installation date is not known. The fountain was designed by George Burnham, and is made from granite mined at Jay, Maine.

In 2010, the fountain was renovated, and set into a protective curb to protect it from snow plowing equipment. This work was funded by the Portland Public Art Committee and the Margaret E. Burnham Charitable Trust; Margaret Burnham was the daughter of the fountain's designer, George Burnham.

The fountain is located on Federal Street, between the Central Fire Station and the Edward T. Gignoux United States Courthouse.
