= Peter Randolph (judge) =

American judge

Judge of the United States District Court for the District of Mississippi
- In office June 25, 1823 – January 30. 1832
- Appointed by: James Monroe
- Preceded by: William Bayard Shields
- Succeeded by: Powhatan Ellis

Personal details
- Born: Peter Randolph; 1779 Nottoway County, Virginia
- Died: January 30, 1832 (aged 52–53) Woodville, Mississippi
- Education: College of William & Mary read law

Peter Randolph (1779 – January 30, 1832) was a United States district judge of the United States District Court for the District of Mississippi.

== Education and career ==
Born in Nottoway County, Virginia, Randolph attended the College of William & Mary, and read law to enter the bar in 1806. He was in private practice in Nottoway County from 1806 to 1812, during which time he also served as a lieutenant colonel in the Virginia State Militia from 1807 to 1810, and as a member of the Virginia House of Delegates. He was a Judge of the General Court of Virginia for the 5th Circuit from 1812 to 1820. He then moved to Woodville, Mississippi, where he was a planter and continued his private practice from 1820 to 1823.

== Federal judicial service ==
Randolph received a recess appointment from President James Monroe on June 25, 1823, to a seat on the United States District Court for the District of Mississippi vacated by Judge William Bayard Shields. He was nominated to the same position by President Monroe on December 5, 1823. He was confirmed by the United States Senate on December 9, 1823, and received his commission the same day. His service terminated on January 30, 1832, due to his death in Woodville.

== See also ==
- Nottoway Plantation, built by his son

== Sources ==
Legal offices
Preceded by William Bayard Shields	Judge of the United States District Court for the District of Mississippi; 1823–1832	Succeeded by Powhatan Ellis
