= George Z. Singal =

American judge (born 1945)

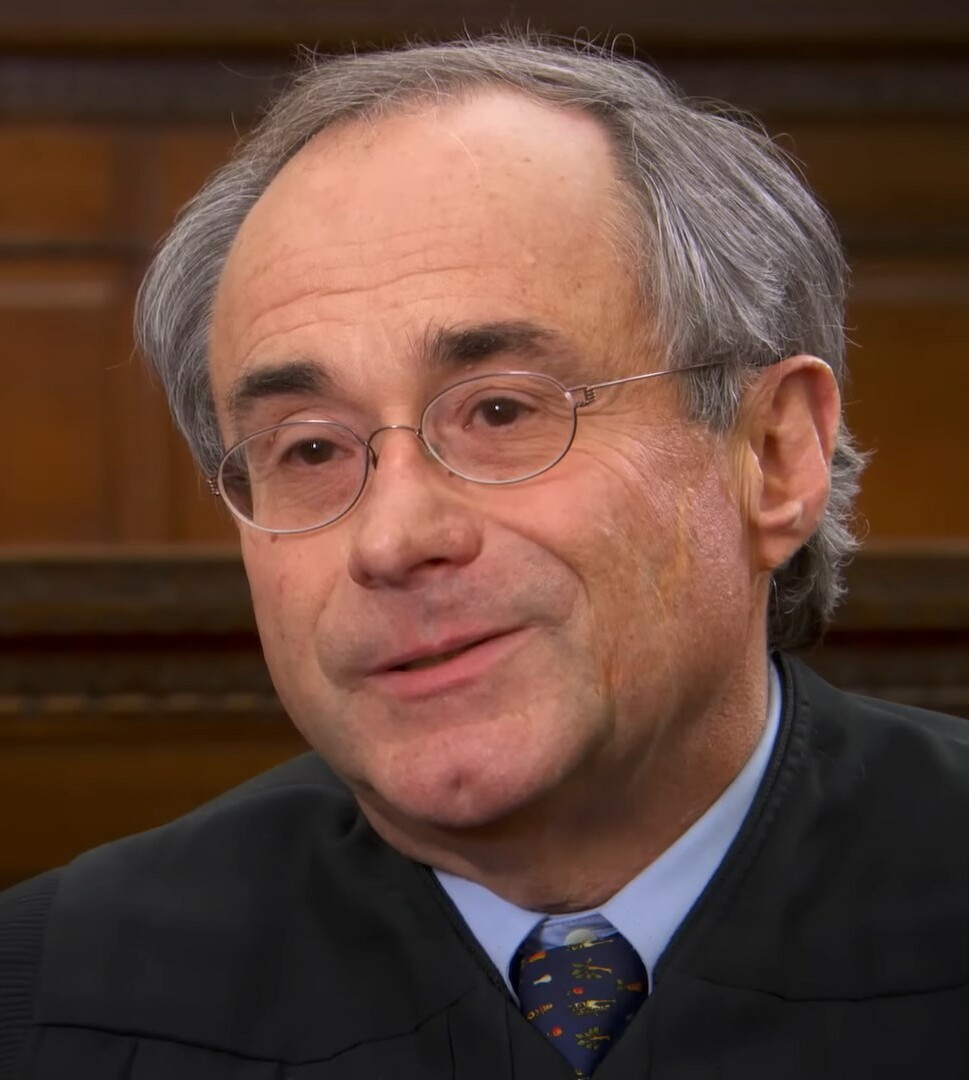
- Singal in 2012

Judge of the United States Foreign Intelligence Surveillance Court
- In office May 19, 2019 – May 19, 2026
- Appointed by: John Roberts
- Preceded by: Claire Eagan
- Succeeded by: David J. Novak

Senior Judge of the United States District Court for the District of Maine
- Incumbent
- Assumed office July 31, 2013

Chief Judge of the United States District Court for the District of Maine
- In office 2003–2009
- Preceded by: D. Brock Hornby
- Succeeded by: John A. Woodcock Jr.

Judge of the United States District Court for the District of Maine
- In office July 11, 2000 – July 31, 2013
- Appointed by: Bill Clinton
- Preceded by: Morton A. Brody
- Succeeded by: Jon D. Levy

Personal details
- Born: October 27, 1945 (age 80) Florence, Italy
- Education: University of Maine (BA); Harvard University (JD)

George Zvi-Arjie Singal (born October 27, 1945) is a senior United States district judge of the United States District Court for the District of Maine and served as a judge on the United States Foreign Intelligence Surveillance Court.

== Education and career ==
Singal was born in a refugee camp in Florence, Italy in 1945. His family emigrated to Bangor, Maine, in 1948. He subsequently became a naturalized American citizen. He received a Bachelor of Arts degree from the University of Maine in 1967. He received a Juris Doctor from Harvard Law School in 1970. He was in private practice of law in Maine from 1970 to 2000. He was an assistant county attorney of Office of the County Attorney, Maine from 1971 to 1973. He was a complaint justice in Bangor in 1974.

=== Federal judicial service ===
On May 11, 2000, Singal was nominated by President Bill Clinton to serve as a United States district judge of the United States District Court for the District of Maine, to a seat vacated by Judge Morton A. Brody. He was confirmed by the United States Senate on June 30, 2000, and received commission on July 11, 2000. He served as chief judge from 2003 to 2009. He took senior status on July 31, 2013.

=== Foreign Intelligence Surveillance Court ===
On May 15, 2019, Chief Justice John Roberts appointed Singal to the Foreign Intelligence Surveillance Court for a term beginning May 19, 2019.

== See also ==
- List of Jewish American jurists

== Sources ==
Legal offices
| Preceded by Morton A. Brody | Judge of the United States District Court for the District of Maine; 2000–2013 | Succeeded by Jon D. Levy |
| Preceded by D. Brock Hornby | Chief Judge of the United States District Court for the District of Maine; 2003–2009 | Succeeded by John A. Woodcock Jr. |
| Preceded by Claire Eagan | Judge of the United States Foreign Intelligence Surveillance Court; 2019–2026 | Succeeded by David J. Novak |
