= John A. Peters (1864–1953) =

American judge and politician (1864–1953)

John Andrew Peters
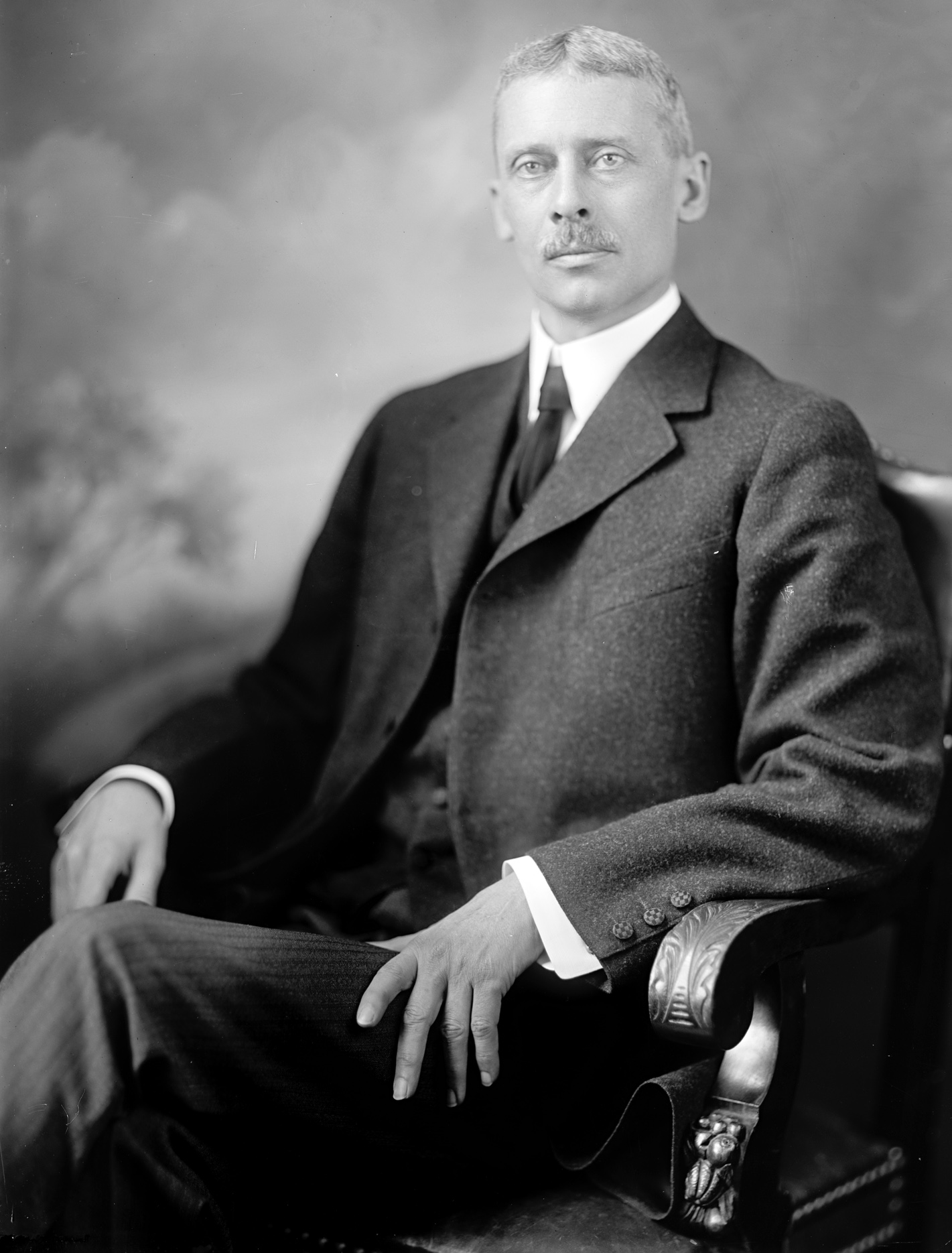

Senior Judge of the United States District Court for the District of Maine
- In office January 2, 1947 – August 1, 1953

Judge of the United States District Court for the District of Maine
- In office November 14, 1921 – January 2, 1947
- Appointed by: Warren G. Harding
- Preceded by: Clarence Hale
- Succeeded by: John David Clifford Jr.

Member of the U.S. House of Representatives from Maine's 3rd district
- In office September 9, 1913 – January 2, 1922
- Preceded by: Forrest Goodwin
- Succeeded by: John E. Nelson

Personal details
- Born: John Andrew Peters; August 13, 1864 Ellsworth, Maine, U.S.
- Died: August 22, 1953 (aged 89) Ellsworth, Maine, U.S.
- Resting place: Woodbine Cemetery; Ellsworth, Maine
- Party: Republican
- Education: Bowdoin College (A.B., A.M.) read law

John Andrew Peters (August 13, 1864 – August 22, 1953) was a United States representative from Maine and a United States district judge of the United States District Court for the District of Maine.

== Education and career ==
Born on August 13, 1864, in Ellsworth, Hancock County, Maine, Peters, a nephew of John A. Peters (1822–1904), attended the common schools. He received an Artium Baccalaureus degree in 1885 from Bowdoin College, read law in 1887, and received an Artium Magister degree in 1888 from Bowdoin College. He entered private practice in Ellsworth from 1887 to 1913. He was a Judge of the Ellsworth Municipal Court from 1896 to 1908. He was a member of the Maine House of Representatives in 1909, 1911 and 1913, serving as Speaker in 1913. He was a delegate at large to the Republican National Convention in 1916. He served as Vice President of the Board of Trustees of Bowdoin College.

== Congressional service ==
Peters was elected as a Republican to the United States House of Representatives of the 63rd United States Congress, by special election, to fill the vacancy caused by the death of United States Representative Forrest Goodwin, and reelected to the four succeeding Congresses until his resignation on January 2, 1922, serving from September 9, 1913, to January 2, 1922.

== Federal judicial service ==
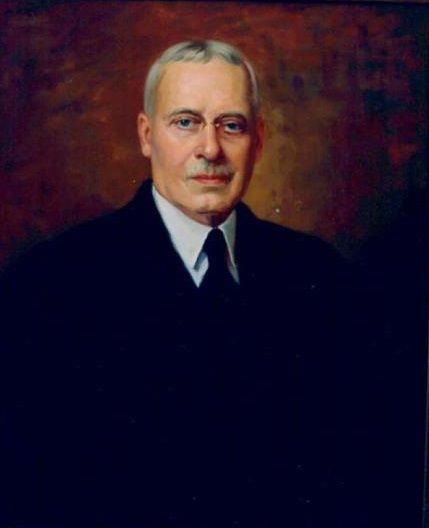
Peters's court portrait.

Peters was nominated by President Warren G. Harding on October 25, 1921, to a seat on the United States District Court for the District of Maine vacated by Judge Clarence Hale. He was confirmed by the United States Senate on November 14, 1921, and received his commission the same day. He, however, did not take his seat until January 2, 1922 after resigning from the House. He assumed senior status on January 2, 1947. His service terminated on August 1, 1953, due to his retirement.

== Death ==
Peters died on August 22, 1953, in Ellsworth. He was interred in Woodbine Cemetery in Ellsworth.

== Sources ==
- United States Congress. "John A. Peters (id: P000253)". Biographical Directory of the United States Congress.
- "Peters, John Andrew - Federal Judicial Center". www.fjc.gov.

U.S. House of Representatives
Preceded by Forrest Goodwin	Member of the U.S. House of Representatives from Maine's 3rd congressional district 1913–1922	Succeeded by John E. Nelson
Legal offices
Preceded by Clarence Hale	Judge of the United States District Court for the District of Maine; 1921–1947	Succeeded by John David Clifford Jr.
