= Halsey Frank =

American attorney

Halsey B. Frank
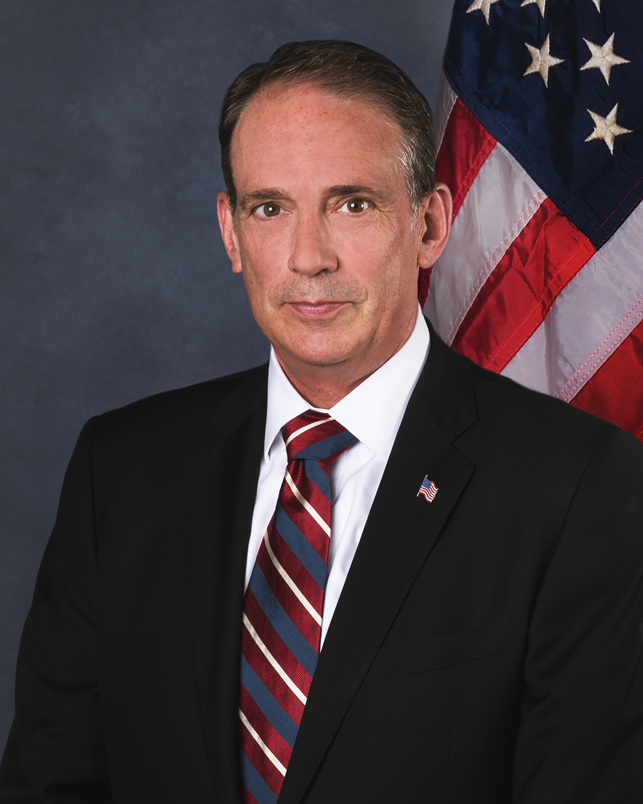

United States Attorney for the District of Maine
- In office October 10, 2017 – February 28, 2021
- President: Donald Trump; Joe Biden
- Preceded by: Thomas E. Delahanty II
- Succeeded by: Darcie N. McElwee

Personal details
- Education: Wesleyan University; Boston University School of Law

Halsey B. Frank is an American attorney who served as the United States Attorney for the District of Maine from 2017 to 2021. Prior to assuming the role of U.S. Attorney, he served as an Assistant United States Attorney for the District of Maine. Frank previously served as an Assistant United States Attorney in the District of Columbia and as a trial attorney in the torts branch of the civil division in the United States Department of Justice. He has prosecuted a number of high-profile criminal cases in Maine. Frank was recommended for the position of U.S. Attorney by U.S. Senator Susan Collins. He was confirmed by the United States Senate on October 3, 2017. He was sworn into office on October 10, 2017. On February 8, 2021, he along with 55 other Trump-era attorneys were asked to resign. He resigned on February 28, 2021. Frank now serves as State Office Representative for Senator Collins in her Portland, Maine office.
