= D. Brock Hornby =

American judge (born 1944)

David Brock Hornby
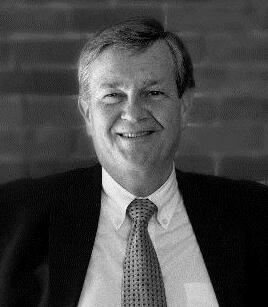

Senior Judge of the United States District Court for the District of Maine
- Incumbent
- Assumed office May 1, 2010

Chief Judge of the United States District Court for the District of Maine
- In office 1996–2003
- Preceded by: Gene Carter
- Succeeded by: George Z. Singal

Judge of the United States District Court for the District of Maine
- In office April 30, 1990 – May 1, 2010
- Appointed by: George H. W. Bush
- Preceded by: Conrad K. Cyr
- Succeeded by: Nancy Torresen

Magistrate Judge of the United States District Court for the District of Maine
- In office 1982–1988

Personal details
- Born: David Brock Hornby; April 21, 1944 (age 81) Brandon, Manitoba, Canada
- Education: University of Western Ontario (BA); Harvard University (JD)

David Brock Hornby (born April 21, 1944) is an inactive senior United States district judge of the United States District Court for the District of Maine.

== Early life and education ==
Hornby was born in 1944 in Brandon, Manitoba, Canada, and was raised there and in London, Ontario. Hornby received a Bachelor of Arts degree from the University of Western Ontario in 1965. From 1965 to 1966, he was enrolled in the Near Eastern Languages and Literatures department of the Harvard University Graduate School of Arts and Sciences. He received a Juris Doctor from Harvard Law School cum laude in 1969 and served as the Supreme Court Note and Developments Editor of the Harvard Law Review.

== Career ==
Following law school, Hornby was a law clerk for Judge John Minor Wisdom of the United States Court of Appeals for the Fifth Circuit in New Orleans (1969–70).

Hornby taught law at the University of Virginia School of Law (1970-1974), becoming an Associate Professor and receiving tenure in 1973. He became a naturalized United States citizen in Abingdon Virginia.

Hornby engaged in the private practice of law at Perkins, Thompson, Hinckley & Keddy in Portland, Maine (1974–82; partner from 1975). He held various officer and board positions including that of President (1977–79) at the Portland Society of Art (1975–84), which then operated both the Portland Museum of Art and the Portland School of Art (now Maine College of Art) during a period when the School attained national accreditation and the Museum embarked on its ambitious expansion program engaging Henry M. Cobb of Pei Cobb Freed & Partners to design the new Museum building with the support of Charles Shipman Payson. Hornby served as trustee and member of various committees (including the executive committee) of Westbrook College (1979–85, 1986–90) (now part of University of New England). He served on the board of the Chamber of Commerce of the Greater Portland Region (1979–82). He also served on the boards of various other charitable and civic endeavors.

== Judicial service ==
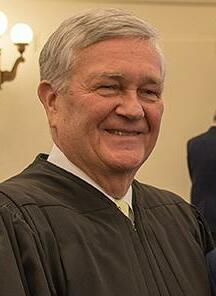
Hornby in 2018

Hornby was the first full-time United States magistrate judge of the United States District Court for the District of Maine (1982-1988). He was succeeded by Magistrate Judge David M. Cohen.

In 1988, Maine Governor John A. McKernan appointed Hornby an associate justice of the Maine Supreme Judicial Court to fill a seat vacated by Justice David Nichols. Hornby served there until 1990 and was succeeded by Justice Morton A. Brody.

President George H. W. Bush appointed Hornby a United States District Judge in the District of Maine in 1990 to fill a seat made vacant by the appointment of Conrad Cyr to the First Circuit. Hornby was confirmed by the U.S. Senate on April 27, 1990. He served as chief judge of the court from 1996 to 2003. Hornby assumed senior status on May 1, 2010, and inactive senior status on February 28, 2022. Hornby was succeeded in the position by Nancy Torresen.

== Awards for judicial service ==
In 2009, Hornby received the 27th Annual Edward J. Devitt Distinguished Service to Justice Award. The Devitt Award is the highest honor that can be bestowed on a federal judge.

In 2014, Hornby received an Honorary Doctor of Laws degree and the Morton A. Brody Distinguished Judicial Service Award from Colby College, given to a judge "who embodies the qualities of integrity, compassion, humanity, and judicial craftsmanship exhibited by Judge Brody." In April 2014, the Maine Legislature passed a resolution recognizing Hornby's achievement.

== Other activities during judicial service ==
Writing and speaking

As a judge, apart from judicial opinions, Hornby has focused his writing on less formal genres. He is a frequent contributor to the Green Bag, an "entertaining journal of law" dedicated to good legal writing. Hornby's writing has also appeared in publications such as Judicature, The ALI Reporter, the Maine Bar Journal, The Federal Lawyer, The Journal of Appellate Practice and Process, In Camera, FCCA Journal, Judges' Journal, Litigation, and FJC Directions. While the federal judiciary was seeking salary restoration, Hornby also wrote and spoke on that topic.

The Green Bag has published "Beatitudes and Jeremiads" as well as several chapters of Hornby's "Fables in Law: Legal Lessons from Field, Forest, and Glen," Aesopian legal fables for lawyers, judges, and law professors. Judicature has published three "imagined conversations" among fictitious former law school classmates now well along in their careers, on the topics of judicial opinion writing, the decline in federal civil trials, and public attention to federal judges. Hornby uses his characters, including the federal trial lawyer Talagud Storey and the general counsel Manny G. Risk, to canvas the major issues surrounding these topics. Hornby has also written about criminal sentencing and summary judgment.

Hornby has taught other judges in the United States and in foreign countries. He has spoken publicly at commencements and ceremonies honoring other judges and lawyers. For many years he updated pattern jury instructions for district courts within the First Circuit Court of Appeals (now updated by Judge Torresen) and a case-based manual for opening statements and closing arguments in jury trials.

Committees and boards

Hornby has served on numerous committees and boards. When Hornby became a United States District Judge, Chief Justice Rehnquist appointed him to the Judicial Conference's Committee on Court Administration and Case Management (CACM) (1990-2000; chair 1997–2000) and as chair of the FJC's Committee on District Judge Education (1995–98). Hornby served on the Judicial Conference itself from 2000 to 2003. The Chief Justice appointed him to the executive committee (2002–03), the Judicial Conduct and Disability Act Study Committee (2004–06), and as chair of the Committee on the Judicial Branch (2005-2012). In 2007, Chief Justice Roberts appointed Hornby chair of an ad hoc committee to secure federal judge salary restoration. Hornby's committee duties have included testifying before Congress.

Judge Hornby was elected to the Council of the American Law Institute in 1996 (ALI member since 1979), and took emeritus status in 2017. He was an Adviser on the Restatement of the Law (Third), Restitution and Unjust Enrichment and Chair of the Awards Committee.

Hornby was a Member of the National Academies' Standing Committee on Science, Technology, and Law (2006–13).

== Selected publications ==
"History Lessons: Instructive Legal Episodes from Maine's Early Years — Episode 3: An Enslaved Man Suing in Federal Court," vol. 26, no. 2 Green Bag 2d 101 (Winter 2023).

"History Lessons: Instructive Legal Episodes from Maine's Early Years — Episode 2: Public School Bible Reading and the Ellsworth Incident," vol. 23, no. 4 Green Bag 2d 289 (Summer 2020).

"History Lessons: Instructive Legal Episodes From Maine's Early Years — Episode 1: Becoming a Lawyer," vol. 23, no. 3 Green Bag 2d 195 (Spring 2020).

"Emails to a federal judge," vol. 103, no. 3 Judicature 73 (Fall 2019).

"Can Federal Sentencing Remain Transparent?" vol. 103, no. 1 Judicature 46 (Spring 2019).

"Final Judgment," vol. 22, no. 1 Green Bag 2d 83 (Autumn 2018).

"Over Ruled," vol. 21, no. 1 Green Bag 2d 17 (Autumn 2017).

"Fables in Law," many chapters, vols 17–20, Green Bag 2d, often reprinted in Maine Bar Journal, the ALI Reporter, and the Harvard Law Record.

"Chief Justices of the United States in Maine," vol. 19, no. 3 Green Bag 2d 241 (Spring 2016).

"Beatitudes and Jeremiads," vol. 17, no. 4 Green Bag 2d 483 (Summer 2014).

"Speaking in Sentences," vol. 14, no. 2 Green Bag 2d 147 (Winter 2011).

"Summary Judgment Without Illusions," vol. 13, no. 3 Green Bag 2d 273 (Spring 2010).

"The Business of the U.S. District Courts," vol. 10, no. 4 Green Bag 2d 453 (Summer 2007).

"Federal Judges and Opinion Writing," vol. 101, no. 3 Judicature 40 (Autumn 2017).

"Federal Judges and Public Attention," vol. 100, no. 3 Judicature 64 (Autumn 2016).

"The Decline in Federal Civil Trials," vol. 100, no. 1 Judicature 37 (Spring 2016).

"Stepping Down," vol. 8, no. 2 The Journal of Appellate Practice and Process 265 (Fall 2006).

"How Jurors See Us," vol. 14, no. 3 Maine Bar Journal 174 (July 1999).

"Higher Education Admission Law Service" (Educational Testing Service, 1973–1982) (loose-leaf treatise updated annually).

"Delegating Authority to the Community of Scholars," 1975 Duke Law Journal 279 (1975).

"Constitutional Limitations on Admissions Procedures and Standards" (with Ernest Gellhorn) 60 Virginia Law Review 975 (1974).

== Personal ==
Hornby is married to Helaine Cora (Mandel) Hornby, a management consultant in human services. They have two children and five grandchildren.

Legal offices
Preceded by Conrad K. Cyr	Judge of the United States District Court for the District of Maine; 1990–2010	Succeeded by Nancy Torresen
Preceded by Gene Carter	Chief Judge of the United States District Court for the District of Maine; 1996–2003	Succeeded by George Z. Singal
