= Lance E. Walker =

American judge (born 1972)

Lance Walker
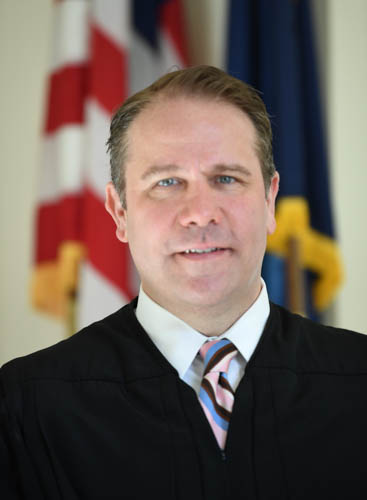

Chief Judge of the United States District Court for the District of Maine
- Incumbent
- Assumed office March 18, 2024
- Preceded by: Jon D. Levy

Judge of the United States District Court for the District of Maine
- Incumbent
- Assumed office October 17, 2018
- Appointed by: Donald Trump
- Preceded by: John A. Woodcock Jr.

Personal details
- Born: Lance Edward Walker; March 13, 1972 (age 54) Milo, Maine, U.S.
- Education: University of Maine (BA, JD)

Lance Edward Walker (born March 13, 1972) is the chief United States district judge of the United States District Court for the District of Maine. He was formerly a justice of the Maine Superior Court.

== Education ==
Walker was born on March 13, 1972, in Milo, Maine. His father was an engineer for the Canadian Pacific Railway. When Walker was in fifth grade, his family moved to Dover-Foxcroft, Maine, where his parents owned a hardware store and travel agency. In 1990, Walker graduated from Foxcroft Academy. He earned his Bachelor of Arts in philosophy from the University of Maine and obtained a Juris Doctor with honors from the University of Maine School of Law.

== Career ==
In 1999 he was in private practice in Bangor, Maine. Upon graduation from law school, Walker served as a law clerk to Justices Atwood, Marden, and Studstrup of the Maine Superior Court for one year. Before his nomination to the bench by Governor of Maine Paul LePage, he worked in private practice at the Portland, Maine, law firm of Norman Hanson & DeTroy. For approximately thirteen years he handled personal injury and products liability claims for insurance companies. He tried twenty cases to verdict.

=== State judicial service ===
Walker was nominated to the state district court by Governor Paul LePage on February 7, 2014, and his appointment was unanimously confirmed by the Maine Senate soon thereafter. Walker was sworn into office on May 2, 2014.

On May 26, 2015, Walker was nominated to the Maine Superior Court by Governor Paul LePage. He was unanimously confirmed by the Maine Senate. He was sworn in on June 17, 2015. Walker's service on the state bench terminated when he became a federal judge.

=== Federal judicial service ===
Walker was recommended to the White House for a federal judgeship by U.S. Senators Susan Collins and Angus King of Maine.

On April 10, 2018, President Donald Trump nominated Walker to serve as a United States district judge of the United States District Court for the District of Maine. He was nominated to the seat vacated by Judge John A. Woodcock Jr., who assumed senior status on June 27, 2017. On June 6, 2018, a hearing on his nomination was held before the Senate Judiciary Committee. On June 28, 2018, his nomination was reported out of committee by a voice vote. On October 11, 2018, his nomination was confirmed by voice vote. He received his judicial commission on October 17, 2018. Walker became chief judge on March 18, 2024.

Walker rejected challenges to Maine's ranked-choice voting system by former Republican U.S. Representative Bruce Poliquin, who was seeking to have ranked-choice voting declared unconstitutional in order to initiate a new election after narrowly losing his seat to Jared Golden.

== Memberships ==
On his Senate Judiciary Committee questionnaire, Walker reported being a member of the Federalist Society, the National Rifle Association of America, the Woodlands Club, Scarborough Fish & Game Club, and the Maine Audubon Society.

== Political activities ==
He was appointed by Governor Paul LePage in 2012 to serve on the Board of the Combat Sports Authority of Maine. He served on the board from 2012 to 2013.

Legal offices
Preceded by John A. Woodcock Jr.	Judge of the United States District Court for the District of Maine; 2018–present	Incumbent
Preceded by Jon D. Levy	Chief Judge of the United States District Court for the District of Maine; 2024–present	Incumbent
