= William G. Barrows =

American judge (1821–1886)

William Griswell Barrows (January 12, 1821 – April 6, 1886), of Brunswick, Maine, was a justice of the Maine Supreme Judicial Court from March 27, 1863, to March 24, 1884.

== Early life, education, and career ==
Born at Yarmouth, Maine, Barrows graduated from Bowdoin College in 1839 and read law in Portland with General Samuel Fessenden, a relative, and afterwards with Judge Tenney in Norridgewock, to gain admission to the bar in 1842. He commenced the practice of law in Brunswick, Maine, which remained his home for the rest of his life. From 1853 to 1855 he edited the Brunswick Telegraph.

== Judicial service and later life ==
He served eight years as Judge of Probate for Cumberland County, Maine, being appointed about 1854, and then elected in 1856 and reelected in 1860. During his career on the bench, he "sentenced the famous Bowdoinham bank robbers to 17 years imprisonment and passed the death sentence upon Wagner, the Isle of Shoals murderer".

On March 27, 1863, Governor Abner Coburn appointed Barrows to a seat on the Supreme Judicial Court of Maine vacated by the resignation of Judge Edward Fox. Barrows was reappointed at the end of each successive term, on March 24, 1870, and March 24, 1877. He declined reappointment in 1884, serving until March 24, 1884.

Following his service on the court, he was one of the founders of the Brunswick Public Library, to which he donated a large number of volumes from his extensive personal library at the time of its construction.

In politics, Barrows was a Republican, though "he never was a strong partisan".

== Personal life and death ==
His first wife was Hulda M. Whitemore of Brunswick, niece of General J. C. Humphreys. Hulda died in 1866. Barrows's second wife, who survived him, was Mary P. Fessenden, a relative of the judge and cousin of William Pitt Fessenden. Barrows left no surviving children.

Barrows died at his home in Brunswick at the age of 65, having been in ill health for over a year, and having been unconscious for the week before his death.

Political offices
Preceded by Edward Fox	Justice of the Maine Supreme Judicial Court; 1863–1884	Succeeded by Enoch Foster
