= List of first minority male lawyers and judges in Maine =

This is a list of the first minority male lawyer(s) and judge(s) in Maine. It includes the year in which the men were admitted to practice law (in parentheses). Also included are men who achieved other distinctions, such as becoming the first in their state to graduate from law school or become a political figure.

== Firsts in Maine's history ==
=== Lawyers ===
- First African American male: Macon Bolling Allen (1844)
- First African American male (actively practice): Milton Roscoe Geary in 1913
- First African American male to appear before a Maine court: Henry E. Quarles, Sr. (1920)

=== State judges ===
- First Jewish American male: Edward Glezer in 1926
- First Jewish American male (Maine Supreme Court): Abraham M. Rudman in 1965
- First Greek American male: Nicholas W. Danton in 1971
- First blind male: Courtland D. Perry in 1976
- First African American male (Maine Supreme Court): Rick E. Lawrence in 2000
- First African American male (Chief Justice; Maine Supreme Court): Rick E. Lawrence in 2022

== Firsts in local history ==
- Milton Roscoe Geary: First African American male to graduate from the University of Maine School of Law (1913) [Cumberland County, Maine]. He was the first African American male lawyer admitted to the Penobscot County Bar Association, Maine.
- John H. Hill (1879): First African American male lawyer admitted to the bar of the Supreme Judicial Court of Sagadahoc County, Maine

== See also ==
- List of first minority male lawyers and judges in the United States

== Other topics of interest ==
- List of first women lawyers and judges in the United States
- List of first women lawyers and judge in Maine
