= Nathan Webb (judge) =

American judge (1825–1902)

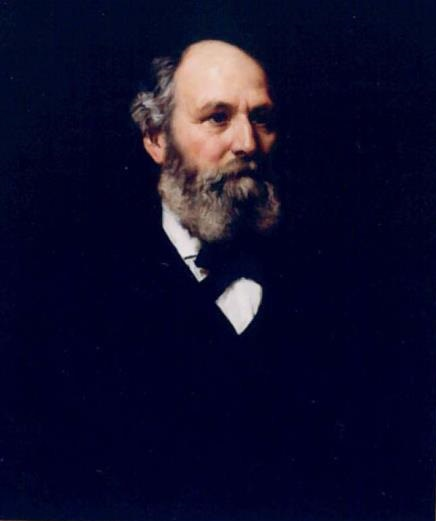
- Webb's court portrait

Judge of the United States District Court for the District of Maine
- In office January 24, 1882 – June 30, 1902
- Appointed by: Chester A. Arthur
- Preceded by: Edward Fox
- Succeeded by: Clarence Hale

Personal details
- Born: Nathan Webb; May 7, 1825 Portland, Maine
- Died: November 8, 1902 (aged 77) Portland, Maine
- Education: Harvard University (A.B.) read law

Nathan Webb (May 7, 1825 – November 8, 1902) was a United States district judge of the United States District Court for the District of Maine.

== Education and career ==
Born in Portland, Maine, Webb received an Artium Baccalaureus degree from Harvard University in 1846 and read law to enter the bar in 1849. He was in private practice in Portland from 1849 to 1865, becoming county attorney of Cumberland County, Maine in 1866. He was the United States Attorney for the District of Maine from 1870 to 1878, thereafter resuming his private practice in Portland until 1882.

== Federal judicial service ==
On January 18, 1882, Webb was nominated by President Chester A. Arthur to a seat on the United States District Court for the District of Maine vacated by Judge Edward Fox. Webb was confirmed by the United States Senate on January 24, 1882, and received his commission the same day. Webb served in that capacity until his retirement from the bench on June 30, 1902. He died in Portland on November 8, 1902. He is buried at Evergreen Cemetery.

== Sources ==
Legal offices
Preceded by Edward Fox	Judge of the United States District Court for the District of Maine; 1882–1902	Succeeded by Clarence Hale
