= Judge Leavy =

Judge Leavy may refer to:

- Charles H. Leavy (1884–1952), judge of the United States District Court for the Western District of Washington
- Edward Leavy (1929–2023), judge of the United States Court of Appeals for the Ninth Circuit

== See also ==
- Judge Levy (disambiguation)
