= Clara Hapgood Nash =

American lawyer (1839–1921)

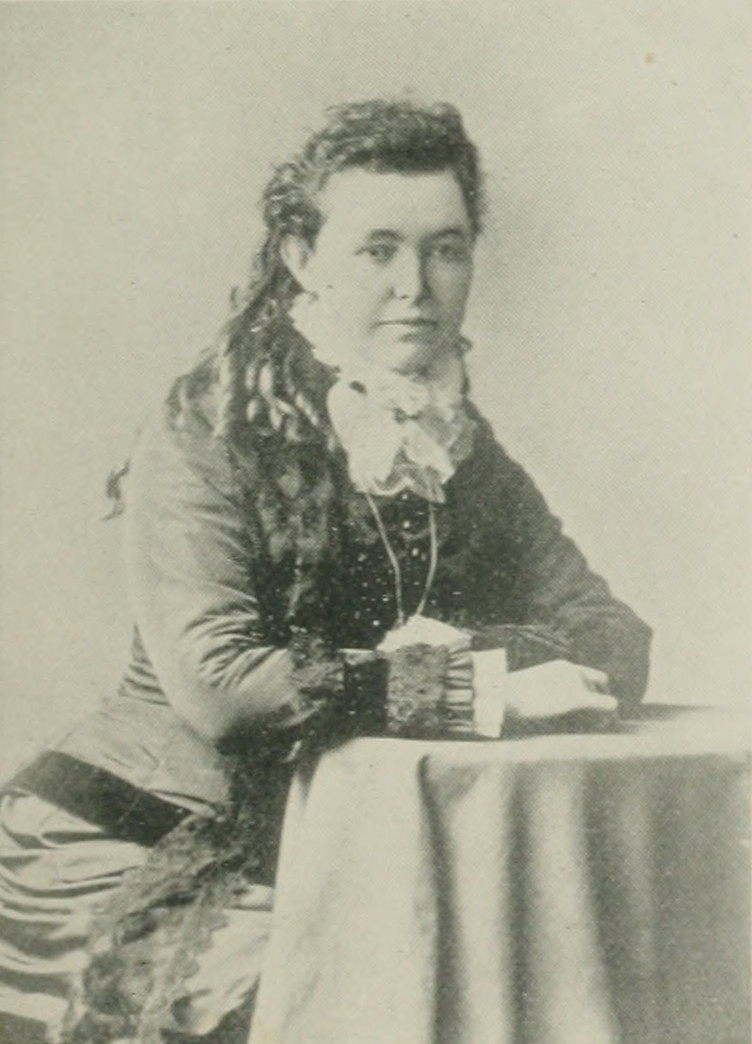
Clara Hapgood Nash, c. 1893.

Clara Holmes Hapgood Nash (January 15, 1839 – March 18, 1921) was an American lawyer who was the first woman admitted to the bar in New England (Maine).

== Family and education ==
Born Clara Holmes Hapgood in Fitchburg, Massachusetts, she was the fifth of eight children of John and Mary Ann Hosmer Hapgood. On her mother's side she was related to the sculptor Harriet Hosmer, while on her father's side she was related to Henry Durant, the founding president of the University of California.

In 1846 the family moved to Acton, the hometown of both of Clara's parents. Due to ill health, her early schooling was frequently interrupted, but she eventually graduated from the State Normal School in Framingham, after which she became a teacher in the towns of Acton, Marlborough, and Danvers. She also edited a pro-temperance publication, The Crystal Font.

In 1869, she married Frederick Cushing Nash, a Maine lawyer who taught for a time in the nearby South Acton school district. They had a son, Frederick Hapgood Nash.

== Career ==
Not long after her marriage, Nash began to study the law in her husband's office (a normal form of legal apprenticeship at the time). In 1871, the governor of Maine appointed Nash a justice of the peace alongside two other women, Anne P. Ladd and Inez A. Blanchard. In October 1872, Nash was admitted to the bar of the Supreme Judicial Court of Maine, thereby becoming the first woman admitted to the bar in New England as well as one of the earliest women lawyers anywhere in the United States. Her achievement was widely reported in newspapers throughout the country.

Nash formed a partnership with her husband, and they practiced together in Maine. In 1873, she appeared in court for the first time and made the opening remarks in a jury trial. That same year, she led a petition drive in favor of women's suffrage. In Maine, justices of the peace had limited authority. While they were permitted to administer oaths, officiate marriages, take depositions, and acknowledge deeds, justices of the peace notably were not permitted to hold trials. In 1874, the Maine Supreme Court prohibited women justices of the peace, ruling that women were ineligible to be justices because the state's constitution was "the work of its male citizens" and did not intend to permit women officers.

Nash and her husband later moved back to Massachusetts, where Nash could no longer practice law because Massachusetts did not yet admit women to the bar. Instead, she served as the first librarian of the Citizens’ Library in West Acton and continued to be very active in the temperance movement. She served as president of the local affiliate of the Woman's Christian Temperance Union for over two decades.

Nash also wrote poetry, especially poems about family and occasional verse for birthdays and anniversaries. In 1909, she published a volume of poetry with Cambridge University Press entitled Verses. One of her poems, "Mother", was set to the music of Elmer Samuel Hosmer.

Around 1915, Nash and her husband moved from Acton to Newton. Frederick died in February 1921 and Clara followed him in March. They are buried together in Mount Hope Cemetery.

== See also ==
- List of first women lawyers and judges in Maine
