= Catherine Connors =

American judge (born 1959)

Associate Justice of the Maine Supreme Judicial Court
- Incumbent
- Assumed office February 4, 2020
- Appointed by: Janet Mills
- Preceded by: Jeffrey Hjelm

Personal details
- Born: January 26, 1959 (age 67) East Orange, New Jersey, U.S.
- Education: Northwestern University (BA, JD)

Catherine Connors (born January 26, 1959) is an American lawyer who has served an associate justice of the Maine Supreme Judicial Court.

== Education ==
Connors earned a Bachelor of Arts degree from Northwestern University in 1981 and a Juris Doctor from Northwestern University Pritzker School of Law in 1984.

== Career ==
Connors practiced at Pierce Atwood. Connors also filed an amicus brief in the U.S. Supreme Court in support of striking down the Defense of Marriage Act.

=== Maine Supreme Judicial Court ===
On January 6, 2020, Governor Janet Mills announced the nomination of Connors to the seat vacated by Jeffrey Hjelm. On January 30, 2020, her nomination was approved by the legislate judiciary committee by a 11–0 vote. On February 4, 2020, she was confirmed unanimously by the Maine Senate.

Legal offices
| Preceded by Jeffrey Hjelm | Associate Justice of the Maine Supreme Judicial Court; 2020–present | Incumbent |
