= Darcie N. McElwee =

American judge (born 1973)

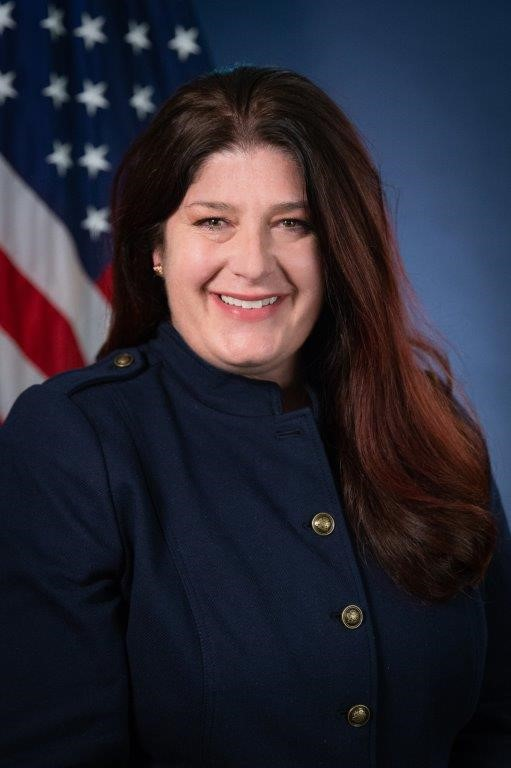

Justice of the Maine Superior Court
- Incumbent
- Assumed office March 28, 2025
- Appointed by: Janet Mills
- Preceded by: Julia M. Lipez

United States Attorney for the District of Maine
- In office October 8, 2021 – February 17, 2025
- President: Joe Biden; Donald Trump
- Preceded by: Halsey Frank
- Succeeded by: Craig M. Wolff (acting)

Personal details
- Born: Darcie Nicole McElwee; 1973 (age 52–53) Portland, Maine, U.S.
- Education: Bowdoin College (AB); University of Maine (JD)

Darcie Nicole McElwee (born 1973) is an American lawyer who has served as a justice of the Maine Superior Court since 2025. She served as the United States attorney for the District of Maine from 2021 to 2025.

== Education ==
McElwee received her Bachelor of Arts from Bowdoin College in 1995 and her Juris Doctor from the University of Maine School of Law in 1998.

== Career ==
McElwee began her legal career as an assistant district attorney for the Penobscot and Piscataquis counties in Maine from 1998 to 2002. Between 2005 and 2008, McElwee was an adjunct professor of advanced trial advocacy at the University of Maine School of Law. From 2002 to 2021, she served as an Assistant United States Attorney in the United States Attorney's Office for the District of Maine. Since 2005, she has been the coordinator of Project Safe Neighborhoods.

=== U.S. attorney for the District of Maine ===
On August 10, 2021, President Joe Biden nominated McElwee to be the United States attorney for the District of Maine. On September 30, 2021, her nomination was reported out of committee by voice vote. On October 5, 2021, her nomination was confirmed in the United States Senate by voice vote. On October 8, 2021, she was sworn in by Chief U.S. District Judge Jon D. Levy. On February 17, 2025, she was terminated as U.S. attorney by the Trump administration.

=== Maine Superior Court ===
On February 28, 2025, Governor Janet Mills nominated McElwee to serve as a justice of the Maine Superior Court. Her nomination advanced out of the judicial committee by an 8–2 vote. On March 20, 2025, she was confirmed by the Maine Senate. She was sworn into office on March 28, by Governor Mills.

Legal offices
Preceded by Halsey Frank; Donald E. Clark; Acting	United States Attorney for the District of Maine; 2021–2025	Succeeded by Craig M. Wolff; Acting
