= Thomas E. Delahanty =

American judge

Judge of the Maine Supreme Judicial Court
- In office September 5, 1973 – February 4, 1985
- Appointed by: Kenneth M. Curtis

Judge of the Maine Superior Court
- In office December 31, 1958 – September 5, 1973
- Appointed by: Edmund Muskie

Personal details
- Born: July 26, 1914 Lewiston, Maine, U.S.
- Died: February 4, 1985 (aged 70) Lewiston, Maine, U.S.
- Spouse: Jeanne Clifford (m. 1942)
- Children: Thomas E. Delahanty II; John D. Delahanty; Kevin B. Delahanty
- Education: George Washington University; Columbus School of Law

Thomas Edward Delahanty (July 26, 1914 – February 4, 1985) was a justice of the Maine Supreme Judicial Court. He was appointed to the position on September 5, 1973 and later served as active retired from August 31, 1979 until his death.

== Early life and education ==
Delahanty was the son of an Irish immigrant and working-class parents, Thomas and Agnes Culbert Delahanty. He was the third of five children and attended Lewiston High School where he excelled at baseball and football. He worked in local textile mills to earn money for law school. After getting an athletic scholarship to George Washington University, he earned a law degree from the Columbus School of Law. After an ulcer kept him out of the military during World War II, he became a special agent for the Federal Bureau of Investigation.

== Career ==
In 1945, Delahanty returned to Lewiston, Maine and opened a law office. In 1948, he was a delegate to Democratic National Convention from Maine. In 1954, he was a candidate for United States House of Representatives from Maine's 2nd congressional district. Delahanty was appointed to the Maine Superior Court on December 31, 1958, to succeed Justice Donald W. Webber, as one of Edmund Muskie's final acts as Governor of Maine. Delahanty served on the Superior Court until his appointment to the Maine Supreme Judicial Court on September 5, 1973.

== Personal life ==
Thomas E. Delahanty was married to Jeanne Clifford who was the daughter of Judge John David Clifford, Jr., cousin to Judge Robert W. Clifford, and granddaughter of John M. C. Smith, a U.S. Representative from Michigan's 3rd congressional district. Their eldest son, Thomas E. Delahanty II, was appointed as a justice of the Maine Superior Court.

Thomas and his wife, Jeanne, regularly spent summers residing at Pine Point in Scarborough, Maine.

== Legacy ==
Following his death, a memorial service was held for Thomas E. Delahanty on June 10, 1985 at the Androscoggin County Courthouse.

The Androscoggin County Law Library was named in honor of Thomas E. Delahanty until it closed in 2014.
