= Edward T. Gignoux United States Courthouse =

- U.S. Courthouse
- U.S. National Register of Historic Places
- U.S. Historic district – Contributing property
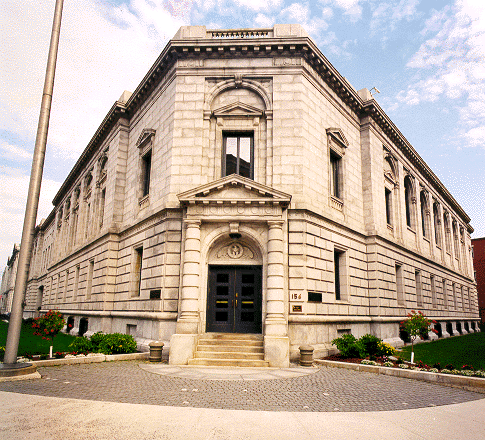

- Location within Maine Location within the United States
- Map showing the location of Edward T. Gignoux US Courthouse
- Location: 156 Federal Street, Portland, Maine
- Coordinates: 43°39′31″N 70°15′42″W
- Area: 0.7 acres (0.28 ha)
- Built: 1908
- Architect: James Knox Taylor
- Architectural style: Italian Renaissance Revival
- Part of: Portland Waterfront (ID74000353)
- NRHP reference No.: 74000168

Significant dates
- Added to NRHP: February 12, 1974
- Designated CP: May 2, 1974

The Edward T. Gignoux U.S. Courthouse is a historic courthouse at 156 Federal Street in Portland, Maine, United States. It is the courthouse for the United States District Court for the District of Maine.

== Building history ==
When it was completed in 1911, the U.S. Courthouse in Portland, now known as the Edward T. Gignoux U.S. Courthouse, was the first federal courthouse in Maine. Its national stature combined with its distinctive Italian Renaissance Revival architecture brought prestige to Portland's civic center. Designed by James Knox Taylor, Supervising Architect of the U.S. Treasury Department, the courthouse's classical details complement its neighbors surrounding Lincoln Park, which include the U.S. Custom House (1872), Cumberland County Courthouse (1910), and Portland City Hall (1912). The U.S. Courthouse was listed in the National Register of Historic Places in 1974.

Construction of the U.S. Post Office Building near Lincoln Park in 1868 helped establish the area as a location for public buildings at the turn of the twentieth century. By 1908, the federal government had acquired a prominent site for a new courthouse adjacent to the park, and construction began that year. Knox designed a trapezoidal building with an interior courtyard to be constructed in two phases. The U-shaped first phase of construction was completed in 1911. In 1931–32, Knox's original design was completed, closing the U, under the direction of the Office of the Supervising Architect under James A. Wetmore. The new construction provided space for a post office and additional offices on the upper floors.

In 1988, the U.S. Courthouse was renamed in honor of Judge Edward T. Gignoux, a veteran of 26 years on the bench, who had gained notoriety when he presided over the contempt trial of activists who attempted to disrupt the Democratic National Convention in Chicago in 1968.

In 1996, the courthouse underwent extensive modernization, which added two new courtrooms in the 1931–32 addition. The principal features and details of the first and second floors of the 1911 construction were rehabilitated and restored. As a result of the project, the Edward T. Gignoux U.S. Courthouse was awarded an Institutional Preservation Award from Greater Portland Landmarks in 1999.

== Architecture ==
The Edward T. Gignoux U.S. Courthouse's Italian Renaissance Revival style reflects its architect's belief that classicism was well suited for federal buildings. Entirely faced with New England granite, the building is composed of two stories above a raised stone base. Each level is articulated on the exterior through the use of subtle variations in ornamentation and textures. The first story is characterized by channeled stone. It is distinguished from the second story by a stringcourse and by the second story's smooth masonry. Differentiation also occurs in the fenestration. While the first floor has recessed, rectangular windows with simple moldings, the second-story windows are larger and elaborately detailed with classical moldings, balcony balustrades, and crowning triangular and segmented pediments, some of which are set within large arched niches with keystones. A continuous frieze, dentil molding, and cornice finish the top of the wall, where a parapet caps the composition. A succession of circular dormer windows punctuates the attic story of the slate-shingled mansard roof. The exterior articulation and ornamentation of the 1931–32 addition faithfully replicates the architectural detail of the original 1911 construction.

The building's trapezoidal plan occupies an entire city block bounded by Federal, Newbury, Pearl, and Market Streets. The building's original U-shaped plan comprises the southwest portion of the block, with the 1931–32 addition completing the northeast side and enclosing the central courtyard. The courtyard is accessed through a porte-cochere on Federal Street, and features buff-colored brick walls with granite stringcourses and keystones for the walls.

The building's formal entrance, located at the angled corner at Federal and Market Streets, is marked by a large, triangular pediment that surmounts a Doric frieze and engaged columns decorated with banded rustication. The entrance leads into the elliptical Rotunda, an elegant and open two-story foyer with refined classical detailing. The Rotunda features a curving marble staircase with a balustrade of thin cast-iron balusters, rising to the second floor along the perimeter of the room.

The elegant public spaces are symmetrically composed using classical proportions and details for the bases, wainscoting, and crown molding. Stained wood finishes, such as oak and pine, are used in the courtrooms, corridors, and judicial chambers. Marble finishes and terrazzo floors are reserved for the courtrooms and the corridors in the first floor. Interior finishes in the 1931–32 addition reveal the reduced or — stripped — classical style of the era, as seen in the abstracted designs in the terrazzo flooring and the flattened moldings used for the door framing.

In 1992, a major renovation project began to modernize and renovate the historic fabric of the building. Space in the original 1911 floor plan was converted into the Court Clerk offices and a new Magistrate Hearing room. District Courtroom No. 1 was carefully restored to its original design — including arched casement windows, period light fixtures, original color palette, and replicated plaster moldings for the ceiling.

The renovations to the 1932 east wing allowed for significant alterations, most notably for the new District Courtroom No. 2, which features an open, two-story space illuminated by skylights and contemporary materials and finishes. The Edward T. Gignoux U.S. Courthouse remains a fine example of early twentieth century Federal architecture and an important historic landmark in Portland.

== See also ==
- National Register of Historic Places listings in Portland, Maine
- Pullen Fountain
