= Morton A. Brody =

American judge (1933–2000)

Morton Aaron Brody
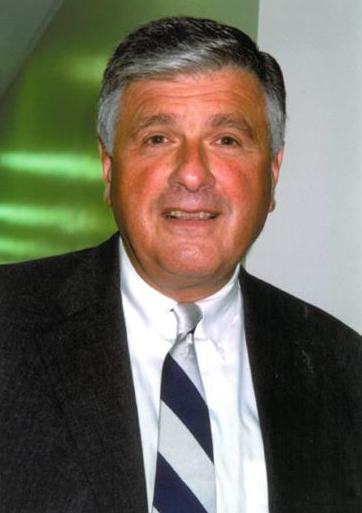

Judge of the United States District Court for the District of Maine
- In office July 25, 1991 – March 25, 2000
- Appointed by: George H. W. Bush
- Preceded by: Seat established by 104 Stat. 5089
- Succeeded by: George Z. Singal

Personal details
- Born: Morton Aaron Brody; June 12, 1933 Lewiston, Maine
- Died: March 25, 2000 (aged 66) Boston, Massachusetts
- Education: Bates College (BA); University of Chicago Law School (JD)

Morton Aaron Brody (June 12, 1933 – March 25, 2000) was a United States district judge of the United States District Court for the District of Maine from 1991 to 2000.

== Education and career ==
Brody was born in Lewiston, Maine. He graduated from Bates College with a Bachelor of Arts degree in 1955 and University of Chicago Law School with a J.D. degree in 1958. Brody was engaged in private practice in Washington, D.C. from 1958 to 1961 and in Waterville, Maine from 1961 to 1980. Brody was then appointed as a justice of the Superior Court of Maine, serving from 1980 to 1985. Brody served as chief justice of the Superior Court from 1985 to 1990, and as an associate justice of the Supreme Judicial Court of Maine from 1990 to 1991.

== Federal judicial service ==
Brody was nominated by George H. W. Bush on June 14, 1991, to a new seat on the United States District Court for the District of Maine created by 104 Stat. 5089. He was confirmed by the United States Senate on July 18, 1991, and received his commission on July 25, 1991. Brody's service terminated on March 25, 2000, due to death in Boston, Massachusetts. Colby College in Maine awards the Morton A. Brody Distinguished Judicial Service Award biennially.

== See also ==
- List of Bates College people

Legal offices
Preceded by Seat established by 104 Stat. 5089	Judge of the United States District Court for the District of Maine; 1991–2000	Succeeded by George Z. Singal
