= John David Clifford Jr. =

American judge

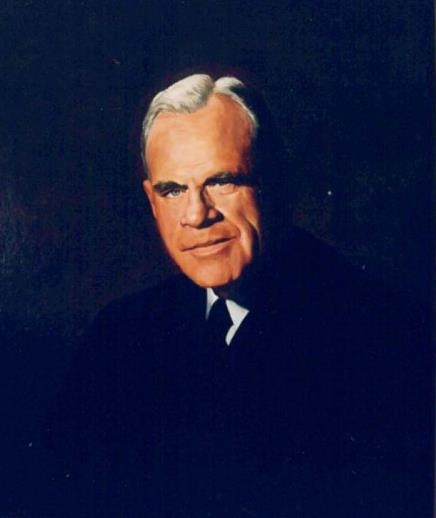
- Clifford's court portrait

Judge of the United States District Court for the District of Maine
- In office March 24, 1947 – November 18, 1956
- Appointed by: Harry S. Truman
- Preceded by: John A. Peters
- Succeeded by: Edward Thaxter Gignoux

Personal details
- Born: May 15, 1887 Lewiston, Maine, U.S.
- Died: November 18, 1956 (aged 69)
- Party: Democratic
- Education: Bowdoin College (A.B.); Georgetown Law (LL.B.)

John David Clifford Jr. (May 15, 1887 – November 18, 1956) was a United States district judge of the United States District Court for the District of Maine.

== Education and career ==
Born in Lewiston, Maine, Clifford received an Artium Baccalaureus degree from Bowdoin College in 1910 and a Bachelor of Laws from Georgetown Law in 1913. Clifford practiced law in Lewiston from 1914 until 1947. He had been active in the Democratic Party prior to his federal appointments and was a member of the Maine House of Representatives from 1915 to 1916. He was the United States Attorney for the District of Maine from 1933 to 1947.

== Federal judicial service ==
On January 10, 1947, Clifford was nominated by President Harry S. Truman to a seat on the United States District Court for the District of Maine vacated by Judge John A. Peters. Clifford was confirmed by the United States Senate on March 14, 1947, and received his commission on March 24, 1947. He held that office until his death on November 18, 1956.

== Family ==
On July 14, 1915, he married Lucile E. Smith of Lansing, Michigan, the daughter of Rep. John M. C. Smith. Clifford's nephew, Robert W. Clifford, son-in-law, Thomas E. Delahanty, and grandson, Thomas E. Delahanty II, have been judges in Maine. His grandson, Thomas E. Delahanty II, has held the United States Attorney position twice.

== Sources ==
Legal offices
Preceded by John A. Peters	Judge of the United States District Court for the District of Maine; 1947–1956	Succeeded by Edward Thaxter Gignoux
