= John A. Woodcock Jr. =

American judge (born 1950)

John Alden Woodcock Jr.
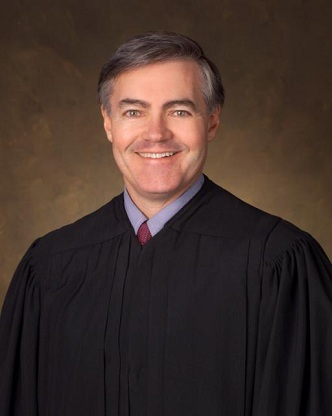

Senior Judge of the United States District Court for the District of Maine
- Incumbent
- Assumed office June 27, 2017

Chief Judge of the United States District Court for the District of Maine
- In office 2009 – January 5, 2015
- Preceded by: George Z. Singal
- Succeeded by: Nancy Torresen

Judge of the United States District Court for the District of Maine
- In office June 16, 2003 – June 27, 2017
- Appointed by: George W. Bush
- Preceded by: Gene Carter
- Succeeded by: Lance E. Walker

Personal details
- Born: John Alden Woodcock Jr. July 6, 1950 (age 75) Bangor, Maine, U.S.
- Education: Bowdoin College (BA); London School of Economics (MA); University of Maine (JD)

John Alden Woodcock Jr. (born July 6, 1950) is a senior United States district judge of the United States District Court for the District of Maine.

== Education and career ==
Born in Bangor, Maine, Woodcock received a Bachelor of Arts degree from Bowdoin College in 1972, a Master of Arts degree from London School of Economics in 1973, and a Juris Doctor from the University of Maine School of Law in 1976. He was in private practice in Maine from 1976 to 2003. He was an assistant district attorney (part-time) in Maine from 1977 to 1978.

=== Federal judicial service ===
On March 27, 2003, Woodcock was nominated by President George W. Bush to a seat on the United States District Court for the District of Maine vacated by Gene Carter. Woodcock was confirmed by the United States Senate on June 12, 2003, and received his commission on June 16, 2003. He served as chief judge from 2009, to January 5, 2015. He assumed senior status as June 27, 2017.

Legal offices
Preceded by Gene Carter	Judge of the United States District Court for the District of Maine; 2003–2017	Succeeded by Lance E. Walker
Preceded by George Z. Singal	Chief Judge of the United States District Court for the District of Maine; 2009–2015	Succeeded by Nancy Torresen
