= Thomas E. Delahanty II =

American judge (1945–2021)

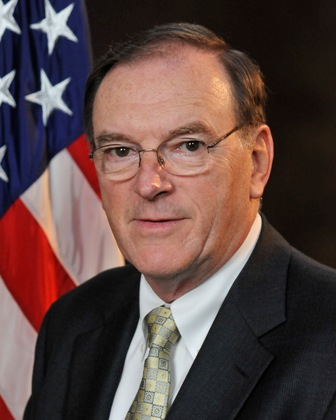

United States Attorney for the District of Maine
- In office July 1, 2010 – March 10, 2017
- President: Barack Obama; Donald Trump
- Preceded by: Jay Patrick McCloskey
- Succeeded by: Halsey Frank
- In office May 1980 – August 1, 1981
- Appointed by: Jimmy Carter
- President: Jimmy Carter; Ronald Reagan
- Preceded by: George J. Mitchell
- Succeeded by: Richard S. Cohen

Chief Judge of the Maine Superior Court
- In office June 6, 1990 – June 6, 1995
- Preceded by: Morton A. Brody
- Succeeded by: Roland A. Cole

Judge of the Maine Superior Court
- In office November 4, 1983 – June 30, 2010
- Appointed by: Joseph E. Brennan

District Attorney of Androscoggin, Franklin, and Oxford Counties
- In office 1975–1980
- Preceded by: Position established
- Succeeded by: Janet Mills

Personal details
- Born: June 6, 1945 Lewiston, Maine, U.S.
- Died: April 12, 2021 (aged 75) Falmouth, Maine, U.S.
- Spouse: Ruth Delahanty
- Children: Patrick Delahanty; Michael Delahanty
- Parents: Thomas E. Delahanty (father); Jeanne Clifford (mother)
- Education: Saint Michael's College (BA); University of Maine (JD)

Thomas E. Delahanty II (June 6, 1945 – April 12, 2021) was an American lawyer and former judge. He was the former United States attorney for the District of Maine.

== Early life and education ==
Delahanty was a graduate of Saint Michael's College in Vermont in 1967 and the University of Maine School of Law in 1970.

== Career ==
From 1970 to 1974, Delahanty was an associate at Marshall, Raymond & Beliveau; County Attorney and Assistant County Attorney with the Androscoggin County Attorney's Office (1971 to 1975); and a District Attorney for Prosecutorial District 3 for Androscoggin, Franklin, and Oxford Counties (1975 to 1980). Delahanty held the U.S. Attorney position from 1980 to 1981 under President Jimmy Carter after George J. Mitchell was appointed to a judicial position.

From 1981 to 1983, Delahanty was a partner in the firm Delahanty & Longley with James B. Longley Jr.. In 1983, Delahanty was appointed to Maine Superior Court where he served from November 4, 1983, to June 30, 2010. He served as chief justice from 1990 until 1995.

Delahanty was nominated by U.S. President Barack Obama on March 10, 2010, appointed on June 23, 2010, and was sworn into office on July 1, 2010.

Delahanty was the fifth person to serve two terms as U.S. Attorney for Maine.

In January 2014, Delahanty was appointed by Attorney General Eric Holder to the Attorney General's Advisory Committee (AGAC), where he was the committee's chairperson of the AGAC Controlled Substances and Asset Forfeiture Working Group. Delahanty was also a member of both the Medical Marijuana Enforcement Working Group and the Northern Border Initiative Subcommittee.

Delahanty remained a U.S. Attorney until the 2017 dismissal of U.S. attorneys on March 10, 2017. He was out of state on vacation with his family when he received the news. Along with fellow former U.S. Attorney Michael W. Cotter, he released his resignation letter to the public after the Justice Department refused to do so citing an exemption to the Freedom of Information Act. Following his dismissal, he returned to the Maine Superior Court as an active retired justice on July 7, 2017.

== Personal life ==
Delahanty's father, Thomas E. Delahanty, and cousin, Robert W. Clifford, are or have also been judges in Maine. His maternal grandfather, John David Clifford, Jr., was a judge and also previously held the United States Attorney position. His great-grandfather was John M. C. Smith, a U.S. Representative from Michigan's 3rd congressional district.

Delahanty had been married since 1970 and had two sons, a granddaughter, and a grandson.

Delahanty died at his home on April 12, 2021, after a battle with pancreatic cancer.

== Legacy ==
Following his death, a memorial service was held for Thomas E. Delahanty II on June 6, 2023 at the Androscoggin County Courthouse. A portrait of Delahanty was revealed which now hangs on the wall of the courtroom.

== See also ==
- 2017 dismissal of U.S. attorneys
