= Jon D. Levy =

American judge (born 1954)

Jon David Levy
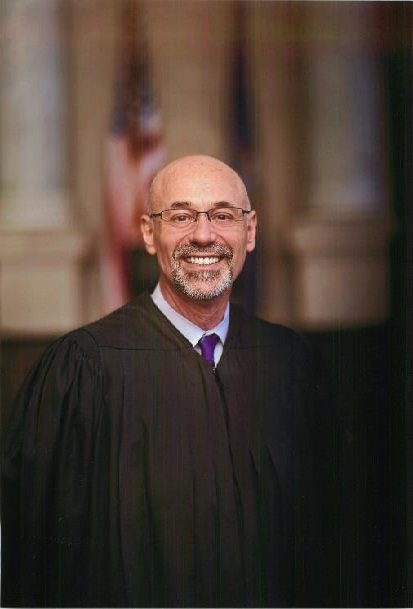

Senior Judge of the United States District Court for the District of Maine
- Incumbent
- Assumed office May 6, 2024

Chief Judge of the United States District Court for the District of Maine
- In office January 1, 2019 – March 18, 2024
- Preceded by: Nancy Torresen
- Succeeded by: Lance E. Walker

Judge of the United States District Court for the District of Maine
- In office May 2, 2014 – May 6, 2024
- Appointed by: Barack Obama
- Preceded by: George Z. Singal
- Succeeded by: Stacey D. Neumann

Associate Justice of the Maine Supreme Judicial Court
- In office March 7, 2002 – May 5, 2014
- Appointed by: Angus King
- Preceded by: Leigh Saufley
- Succeeded by: Jeffrey Hjelm

Personal details
- Born: March 18, 1954 (age 72) New York City, New York, U.S.
- Education: Syracuse University (BS); West Virginia University (JD)

Jon David Levy (born March 18, 1954) is a senior United States district judge of the United States District Court for the District of Maine and served as an associate justice of the Maine Supreme Judicial Court from 2002 to 2014.

== Biography ==
Levy received a Bachelor of Science degree in 1976 from Syracuse University. He received a Juris Doctor in 1979 from the West Virginia University College of Law where he was the lead article editor of the Law Review and graduated Order of the Coif. He served as a law clerk for Judge John Thomas Copenhaver Jr. of the United States District Court for the Southern District of West Virginia from 1979 to 1981. From 1981 to 1982, he was appointed by Judge William Wayne Justice to serve as a special court monitor of the United States District Court for the Southern District of Texas. From 1983 to 1995, he was an attorney in private practice in York, Maine. From 1995 to 2002, he served as a judge of the Maine District Court, serving as deputy chief judge from 2000 to 2001 and chief judge from 2001 to 2002. From 2002 until his confirmation as a federal judge in 2014, he served as an associate justice of the Maine Supreme Judicial Court.

=== Federal judicial service ===
On September 19, 2013, President Barack Obama nominated Levy to serve as a United States district judge of the United States District Court for the District of Maine, to the seat vacated by Judge George Z. Singal, who assumed senior status on July 31, 2013. On January 16, 2014 his nomination was reported out of committee by a 15–2 vote. On April 11, 2014 Senate Majority Leader Reid filed a motion to invoke cloture on the nomination. On April 29, 2014 the United States Senate invoked cloture on his nomination by a 63–34 vote. On April 30, 2014, his nomination was confirmed by a 75–20 vote. He received his judicial commission on May 2, 2014. He served as chief judge from January 1, 2019 to March 18, 2024. He assumed senior status on May 6, 2024.

On May 3, 2024, Levy dismissed a lawsuit filed by Amber Lavigne against Great Salt Bay Community School in Damariscotta, Maine. Lavigne contended that the school board and individual school officers had violated her “right to control and direct the care, custody, education, upbringing and healthcare decisions of her children,” by providing her then 13-year-old daughter with a chest binder and instructions on using it, and by referring to the child using a new name and pronouns, without consulting Lavigne. Levy held that the school district and individual school personnel could not be held legally liable for providing transgender care to minors without parental permission.

== See also ==
- List of Jewish American jurists

Legal offices
Preceded by Leigh Saufley	Justice of the Maine Supreme Judicial Court; 2002–2014	Succeeded by Jeffrey Hjelm
Preceded by George Z. Singal	Judge of the United States District Court for the District of Maine; 2014–2024	Succeeded by Stacey D. Neumann
Preceded by Nancy Torresen	Chief Judge of the United States District Court for the District of Maine; 2019–2024	Succeeded by Lance E. Walker
