= Ashur Ware =

American judge

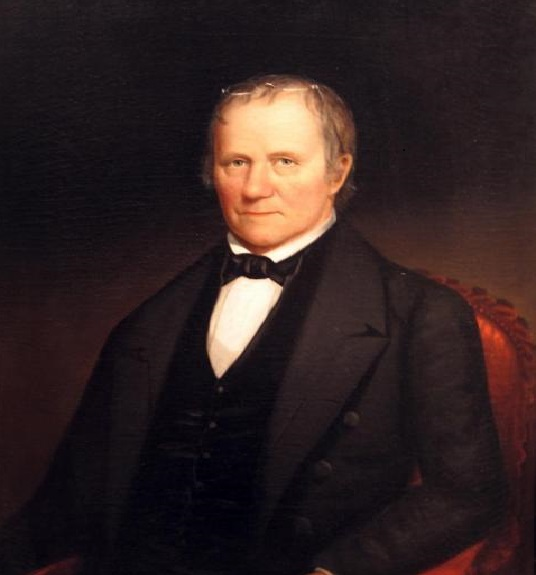
- Ware in 1848

Judge of the United States District Court for the District of Maine
- In office February 15, 1822 – May 31, 1866
- Appointed by: James Monroe
- Preceded by: Albion Parris
- Succeeded by: Edward Fox

1st Secretary of State of Maine
- In office 1820–1822
- Governor: William King
- Preceded by: Office established
- Succeeded by: Amos Nichols

Personal details
- Born: February 10, 1782 Sherborn, Massachusetts
- Died: September 10, 1873 (aged 91) Portland, Maine
- Education: Harvard University (A.B.) read law

Ashur Ware (February 10, 1782 – September 10, 1873) was the 1st Secretary of State of Maine and a United States district judge of the United States District Court for the District of Maine.

== Education and career ==
Born in Sherborn, Massachusetts, Ware received an Artium Baccalaureus degree from Harvard University in 1804 and read law to enter the bar in 1816. He was an editor of the Boston Yankee in Boston, Massachusetts from 1816 to 1817, and of the Eastern Argus in Portland, District of Maine, Massachusetts (State of Maine from March 15, 1820) from 1817 to 1820. He was in private practice in Portland from 1817 to 1820, and then served as the 1st Secretary of State of Maine from 1820 to 1822.

== Federal judicial service ==
On February 15, 1822, Ware was nominated by President James Monroe to a seat on the United States District Court for the District of Maine vacated by Judge Albion Parris. Ware was confirmed by the United States Senate on February 15, 1822, and received his commission the same day. Ware resigned on May 31, 1866, having served for over 44 years, one of the longest tenures of any United States federal judge.

== Death ==
Ware died on September 10, 1873, in Portland.

== See also ==
- List of United States federal judges by longevity of service

== Sources ==
Political offices
Preceded by Office established	1st Secretary of State of Maine; 1820–1822	Succeeded by Amos Nichols
Legal offices
Preceded by Albion Parris	Judge of the United States District Court for the District of Maine; 1822–1866	Succeeded by Edward Fox
