= Conrad K. Cyr =

American judge (1931–2016)

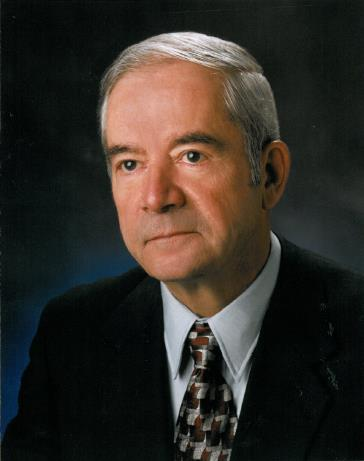

Senior Judge of the United States Court of Appeals for the First Circuit
- In office January 31, 1997 – July 28, 2016

Judge of the United States Court of Appeals for the First Circuit
- In office November 20, 1989 – January 31, 1997
- Appointed by: George H. W. Bush
- Preceded by: Frank M. Coffin
- Succeeded by: Kermit Lipez

Judge of the United States Foreign Intelligence Surveillance Court
- In office May 19, 1987 – November 20, 1989
- Appointed by: William Rehnquist
- Preceded by: William Clark O'Kelley
- Succeeded by: Frank Harlan Freedman

Chief Judge of the United States District Court for the District of Maine
- In office 1983–1989
- Preceded by: Edward Thaxter Gignoux
- Succeeded by: Gene Carter

Judge of the United States District Court for the District of Maine
- In office September 28, 1981 – November 20, 1989
- Appointed by: Ronald Reagan
- Preceded by: George J. Mitchell
- Succeeded by: D. Brock Hornby

Personal details
- Born: December 9, 1931 Limestone, Maine, U.S.
- Died: July 28, 2016 (aged 84) Hampton, New Hampshire, U.S.
- Education: College of the Holy Cross (BS); Yale University (LLB)

Conrad Keefe Cyr (December 9, 1931 – July 28, 2016) was an American jurist who served as a United States circuit judge of the United States Court of Appeals for the First Circuit from 1989 until his death. He was previously a United States district judge of the United States District Court for the District of Maine.

== Early life and education ==
Cyr was born in Limestone, Maine, on December 9, 1931. His father was the owner of a local department store and his mother was a librarian. He graduated from Limestone High School in 1949.

After high school, Cyr attended the College of the Holy Cross in Worcester, Massachusetts, and graduated with a Bachelor of Science, cum laude, in sociology in 1953. As an undergraduate at Holy Cross, he wrote a senior thesis titled, "Sociological advancements among selected foreign-born population groups in the U.S." He then earned his Bachelor of Laws (LL.B.) from Yale Law School in 1956.

== Early legal career ==
Cyr was in private practice of law in Limestone from 1956 to 1959, during which time he established his own legal practice in the same building as his family's department store. He served as an assistant United States attorney in Bangor, Maine, from 1959 to 1961. He was then a referee in bankruptcy for the District of Maine from 1961 to 1973.

== Federal judicial service ==
=== District court service ===
Cyr served as a federal bankruptcy judge from 1973 to 1981, and was chief judge of the Bankruptcy Appellate Panel for the First Circuit from 1980 to 1981. On August 11, 1981, President Ronald Reagan nominated Cyr to the United States District Court for the District of Maine vacated by George J. Mitchell, who had resigned following his appointment as a United States Senator. Cyr was unanimously confirmed by the United States Senate on September 25, 1981. He received his commission on September 28, 1981. Cyr served as chief judge of that District from 1983 to 1989. His service was terminated on November 20, 1989, due to his elevation to the court of appeals.

=== Appeals court service ===
On August 4, 1989, President George H. W. Bush nominated Cyr to serve on the First Circuit, in the seat vacated when Frank M. Coffin assumed senior status. Cyr was confirmed by the Senate on October 24, 1989 and received his commission on November 20, 1989. Cyr assumed senior status on January 31, 1997 and continued to hear cases for several years afterwards. He was succeeded by fellow Maine resident Kermit Lipez.

== Death ==
Cyr died on July 28, 2016, at the age of 84. He was remembered by Chief Judge Jeffrey R. Howard as "a wonderful friend. His dedication to justice and to his country has left an indelible mark on the legal system and on this nation". He is interred in Saint Louis Cemetery in his hometown of Limestone, Maine, alongside his parents, Louis and Kathleen, and sister, Marilyn, who preceded him in death by ten months.

== Notes ==
Legal offices
Preceded by George J. Mitchell	Judge of the United States District Court for the District of Maine; 1981–1989	Succeeded by D. Brock Hornby
Preceded by Edward Thaxter Gignoux	Chief Judge of the United States District Court for the District of Maine; 1983–1989	Succeeded by Gene Carter
Preceded by William Clark O'Kelley	Judge of the United States Foreign Intelligence Surveillance Court; 1987–1989	Succeeded by Frank Harlan Freedman
Preceded by Frank M. Coffin	Judge of the United States Court of Appeals for the First Circuit; 1989–1997	Succeeded by Kermit Lipez
