= Clarence Hale =

American judge

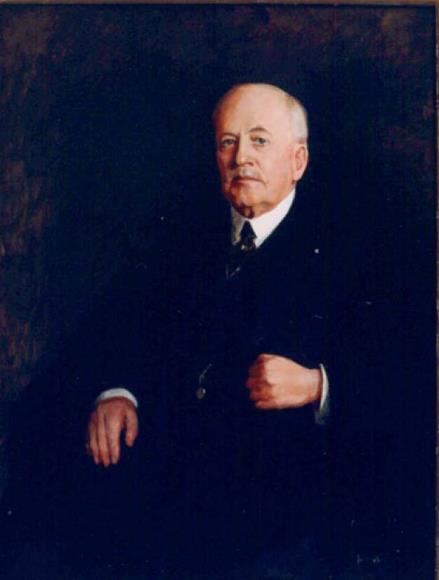
- Hale's court portrait

Senior Judge of the United States District Court for the District of Maine
- In office January 1, 1922 – April 9, 1934

Judge of the United States District Court for the District of Maine
- In office May 19, 1902 – January 1, 1922
- Appointed by: Theodore Roosevelt
- Preceded by: Nathan Webb
- Succeeded by: John A. Peters

Personal details
- Born: April 15, 1848 Turner, Maine
- Died: April 9, 1934 (aged 85) Portland, Maine
- Education: Bowdoin College (A.B., A.M.) read law

Clarence Hale (April 15, 1848 – April 9, 1934) was a United States district judge of the United States District Court for the District of Maine.

== Education and career ==
Born in Turner, Maine, Hale received an Artium Baccalaureus degree from Bowdoin College in 1869, an Artium Magister degree from the same institution, then read law to enter the bar in 1871. He was in private practice in Portland, Maine from 1871 to 1902, also serving as city solicitor for Portland from 1879 to 1882, and as a member of the Maine House of Representatives from 1883 to 1886.

== Federal judicial service ==
On May 13, 1902, Hale was nominated by President Theodore Roosevelt to a seat on the United States District Court for the District of Maine vacated by Judge Nathan Webb. Hale was confirmed by the United States Senate on May 19, 1902, and received his commission the same day. He assumed senior status on January 1, 1922, serving in that capacity until his death on April 9, 1934, in Portland.

== Sources ==
Legal offices
Preceded by Nathan Webb	Judge of the United States District Court for the District of Maine; 1902–1922	Succeeded by John A. Peters
