= Edward Thaxter Gignoux =

American judge

Edward Gignoux
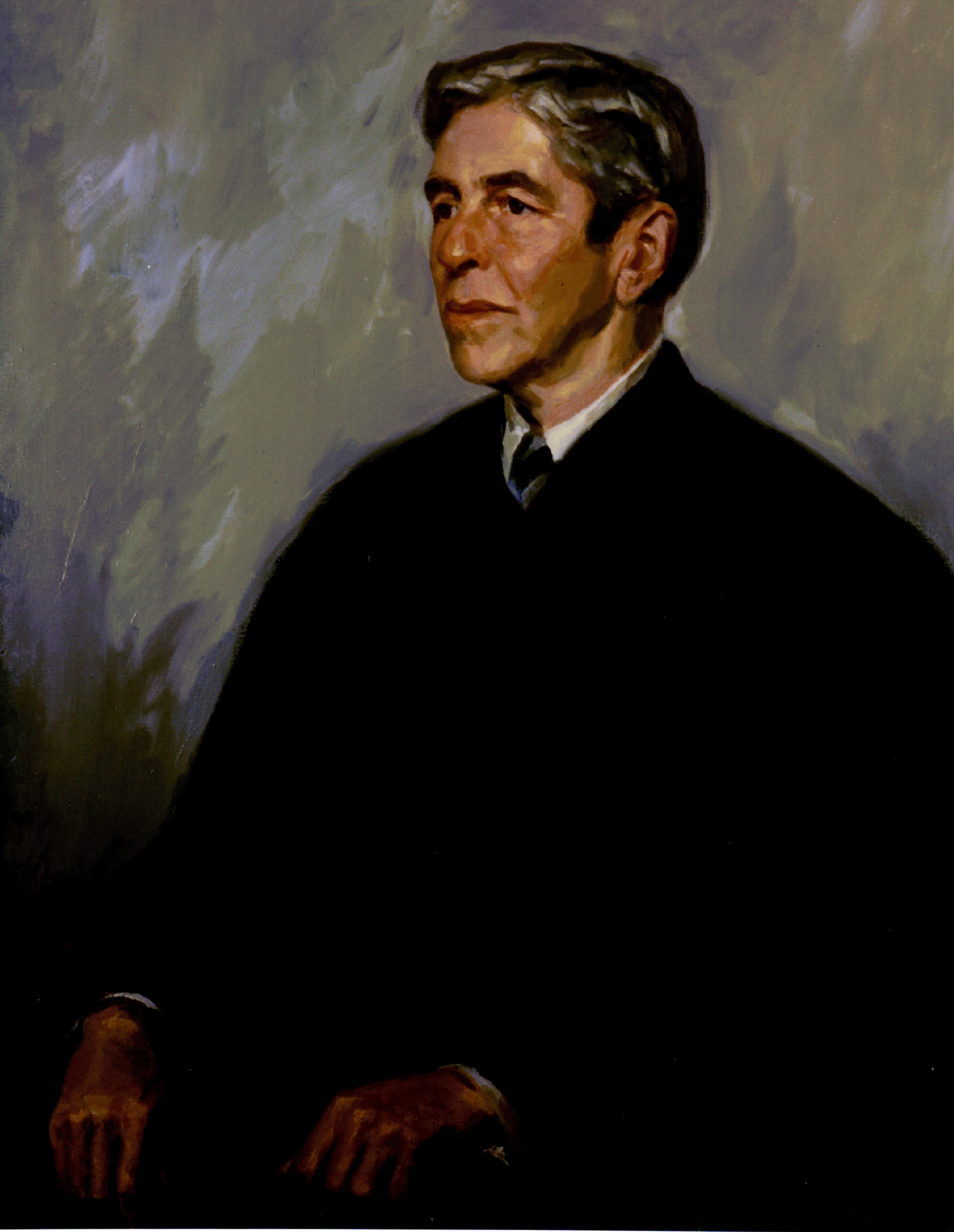

Senior Judge of the United States District Court for the District of Maine
- In office June 1, 1983 – November 4, 1988

Chief Judge of the United States District Court for the District of Maine
- In office 1978 – June 1, 1983
- Preceded by: Position established
- Succeeded by: Conrad K. Cyr

Judge of the United States District Court for the District of Maine
- In office August 26, 1957 – June 1, 1983
- Appointed by: Dwight D. Eisenhower
- Preceded by: John David Clifford Jr.
- Succeeded by: Gene Carter

Personal details
- Born: Edward Thaxter Gignoux; June 28, 1916; Portland, Maine, U.S.
- Died: November 4, 1988 (aged 72); Portland, Maine, U.S.
- Education: Harvard University (BA, LLB)

Edward Thaxter Gignoux (June 28, 1916 – November 4, 1988) was a United States district judge of the United States District Court for the District of Maine.

== Education and career ==
Gignoux was born in Portland, Maine and attended St. George's School in Newport, Rhode Island in 1933. He received an Artium Baccalaureus degree from Harvard College in 1937 and a Bachelor of Laws from Harvard Law School in 1940. He was in private practice in Buffalo, New York from 1940 to 1941, then in Washington, D.C. from 1941 to 1942. He was in the United States Army from January 1942 to February 1946 during World War II. He was stationed in Australia and became a major. He returned to private practice in Portland from 1946 to 1957.

== Federal judicial service ==
On August 9, 1957, Gignoux was nominated by President Dwight D. Eisenhower to a seat on the United States District Court for the District of Maine vacated by Judge John David Clifford Jr. Gignoux was confirmed by the United States Senate on August 22, 1957, and received his commission on August 26, 1957. He was a member of the Judicial Conference of the United States from 1967 to 1973. In 1970, following the rejection of Clement Haynsworth and George Harrold Carswell by the Senate, Gignoux was the runner-up to Harry Blackmun in Richard Nixon‘s quest to fill Abe Fortas’ seat on the Supreme Court. He served as Chief Judge from 1978 to 1983. He was a Judge of the Temporary Emergency Court of Appeals from 1980 to 1987. He assumed senior status on June 1, 1983, serving in that capacity until his death on November 4, 1988, in Portland.

== Honor ==
The Edward T. Gignoux U.S. Courthouse was named in Gignoux's honor in 1982.

== Sources ==
Legal offices
| Preceded by John David Clifford Jr. | Judge of the United States District Court for the District of Maine; 1957–1983 | Succeeded by Gene Carter |
| New office | Chief Judge of the United States District Court for the District of Maine; 1979–1983 | Succeeded by Conrad K. Cyr |
