= Edward Fox (judge) =

American judge

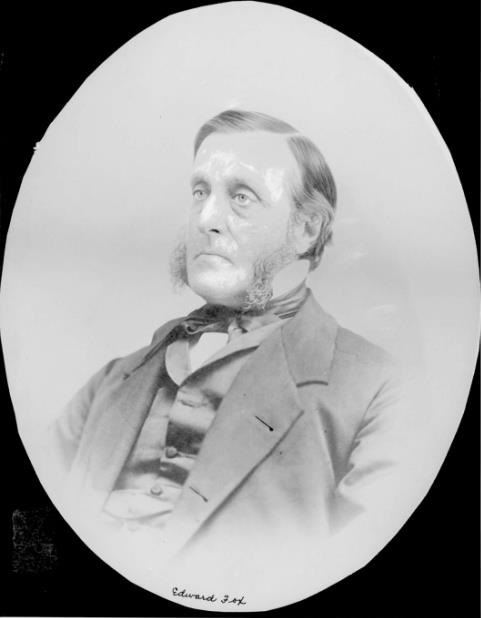

Judge of the United States District Court for the District of Maine
- In office May 31, 1866 – December 14, 1881
- Appointed by: Andrew Johnson
- Preceded by: Ashur Ware
- Succeeded by: Nathan Webb

Personal details
- Born: Edward Fox; June 10, 1815 Portland, Maine
- Died: December 14, 1881 (aged 66) Portland, Maine
- Education: Harvard University; Harvard Law School

Edward Fox (June 10, 1815 – December 14, 1881) was a United States district judge of the United States District Court for the District of Maine.

== Education and career ==
Born in Portland, Massachusetts (in the area that bevame Maine in 1820), Fox graduated from Harvard University in 1834, and from Harvard Law School in 1837. He practiced in Portland, and in Cincinnati, Ohio, and was city solicitor for Portland. He was the county attorney of Cumberland County, Maine. He worked with Neal Dow to draft a prohibition law, which became known as the Maine Law after the state legislature approved it in 1851. Dow claimed credit for authoring the law, but his cousin John Neal revealed Fox's contribution in the press. That contribution was the search and seizure provision, which created a new legal standard for obtaining search warrants and contributed toward to the modern probable cause standard. A decade later he was an associate justice of the Maine Supreme Court from 1862 to 1863.

== Federal judicial service ==
On May 28, 1866, Fox was nominated by President Andrew Johnson to a seat on the United States District Court for the District of Maine vacated by Judge Ashur Ware. Fox was confirmed by the United States Senate on May 30, 1866, and received his commission the next day. Fox served in this position until his death in Portland on December 14, 1881. He is buried at Evergreen Cemetery.

== Sources ==
Legal offices
Preceded by Ashur Ware	Judge of the United States District Court for the District of Maine; 1866–1881	Succeeded by Nathan Webb
Political offices
Preceded by Daniel Goodenow	Justice of the Maine Supreme Judicial Court; 1862–1863	Succeeded by William G. Barrows

Daniel Goodenow
