= Courts of Maine =

Courts of Maine include:

State courts of Maine

- Maine Supreme Judicial Court
  - Maine Superior Court
    - Maine District Courts (13 districts)
    - Maine Problem-Solving Courts

Federal courts located in Maine

- United States District Court for the District of Maine
