= United States District Court for the District of Maine =

United States district court

Coordinates: 43°39′31″N 70°15′19″W

- (D. Me.)
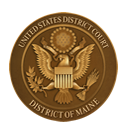

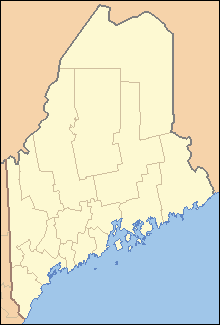
- Location: Edward T. Gignoux U.S. Courthouse (Portland) More locations: Bangor
- Appeals to: First Circuit
- Established: March 30, 1820
- Judges: 3
- Chief Judge: Lance E. Walker

Officers of the court
- U.S. Attorney: Andrew B. Benson
- U.S. Marshal: Kevin W. Neal (acting)
- www.med.uscourts.gov

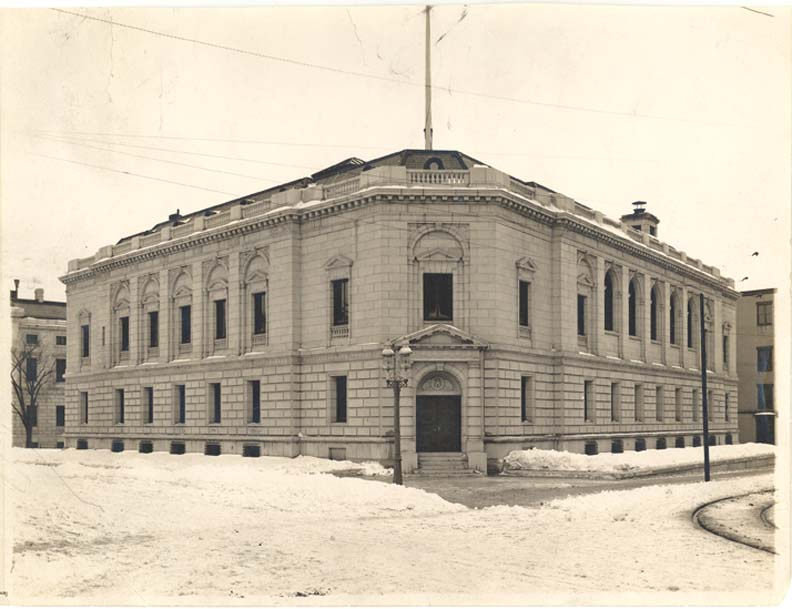
U.S. Courthouse in 1911

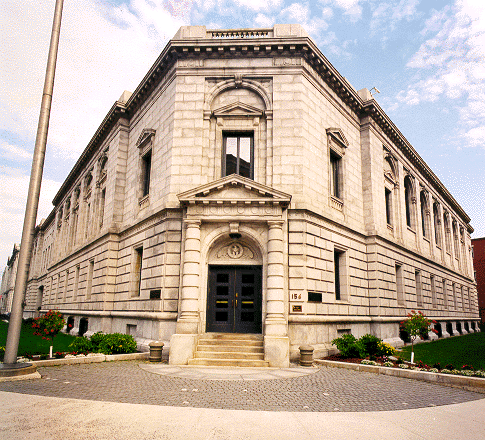
U.S. Courthouse today

The U.S. District Court for the District of Maine (in case citations, D. Me.) is the U.S. district court for the state of Maine. The District of Maine was one of the original thirteen district courts established by the Judiciary Act of 1789, even though Maine was not a separate state from Massachusetts until 1820. The court is headquartered at the Edward T. Gignoux United States Courthouse in Portland, Maine, and has a second courthouse in Bangor, Maine.

The U.S. attorney for the District of Maine represents the United States in criminal and civil litigation before the court. As of October 22, 2025, the U.S. attorney is Andrew B. Benson.

Appeals from the District of Maine are heard by the United States Court of Appeals for the First Circuit (except for patent claims and claims against the U.S. government under the Tucker Act, which are appealed to the Federal Circuit).

== History ==
The District of Maine was one of the thirteen original districts created on September 24, 1789, by the Judiciary Act of 1789, 1 Stat. 73. At the time, Maine was part of the state of Massachusetts. As with other jurisdictions of the time, the District of Maine was originally assigned a single judgeship. Not being assigned to a judicial circuit, it was granted the same jurisdiction as the United States circuit court, except in appeals and writs of error, which were the jurisdiction of the U.S. Circuit Court for the District of Massachusetts. The circuit court jurisdiction of the District of Maine was repealed on February 13, 1801, by 2 Stat. 89, and restored on March 8, 1802, by 2 Stat. 132. On March 30, 1820, shortly after Maine entered the Union, the District of Maine was assigned to the First Circuit and its internal circuit court jurisdiction was again repealed by 3 Stat. 554. A second judgeship was authorized on October 20, 1978, by, 92 Stat. 1629, and a third was authorized on December 1, 1990, by 104 Stat. 5089.

== Current judges ==
As of October 11, 2025:

#	Title	Judge	Duty station	Born	Term of service			Appointed by
#	Title	Judge	Duty station	Born	Active	Chief	Senior	Appointed by
19	Chief Judge	Lance E. Walker	Bangor	1972	2018–present	2024–present	—	Trump
20	District Judge	Stacey D. Neumann	Portland	1978	2024–present	—	—	Biden
21	District Judge	vacant	—	—	—	—	—	—
13	Senior Judge	D. Brock Hornby	inactive	1944	1990–2010	1996–2003	2010–present	G.H.W. Bush
15	Senior Judge	George Z. Singal	Portland	1945	2000–2013	2003–2009	2013–present	Clinton
16	Senior Judge	John A. Woodcock Jr.	Portland	1950	2003–2017	2009–2015	2017–present	G.W. Bush
17	Senior Judge	Nancy Torresen	inactive	1959	2011–2025	2015–2018	2025–present	Obama
18	Senior Judge	Jon D. Levy	inactive	1954	2014–2024	2019–2024	2024–present	Obama

== Magistrate judges ==
John C. Nivison

Karen Frink Wolf

== Vacancies and pending nominations ==
Seat	Prior judge's duty station	Seat last held by	Vacancy reason	Date of vacancy	Nominee	Date of nomination
2	Portland	Nancy Torresen	Senior status	October 11, 2025	–	–

== Former judges ==
#	Judge	Born–died	Active service	Chief Judge	Senior status	Appointed by	Reason for termination
1	David Sewall	1735–1825	1789–1818	—	—	Washington	resignation
2	Albion Parris	1788–1857	1818–1822	—	—	Monroe	resignation
3	Ashur Ware	1782–1873	1822–1866	—	—	Monroe	resignation
4	Edward Fox	1815–1881	1866–1881	—	—	A. Johnson	death
5	Nathan Webb	1825–1902	1882–1902	—	—	Arthur	retirement
6	Clarence Hale	1848–1934	1902–1922	—	1922–1934	T. Roosevelt	death
7	John A. Peters	1864–1953	1922–1947	—	1947–1953	Harding	retirement
8	John David Clifford Jr.	1887–1956	1947–1956	—	—	Truman	death
9	Edward Thaxter Gignoux	1916–1988	1957–1983	1978–1983	1983–1988	Eisenhower	death
10	George J. Mitchell	1933–present	1979–1980	—	—	Carter	resignation
11	Conrad K. Cyr	1931–2016	1981–1989	1983–1989	—	Reagan	elevation
12	Gene Carter	1935–2021	1983–2003	1989–1996	2003–2021	Reagan	death
14	Morton A. Brody	1933–2000	1991–2000	—	—	G.H.W. Bush	death

== Chief Judges ==
Chief judges have administrative responsibilities with respect to their district court. Unlike the Supreme Court, where one justice is specifically nominated to be chief, the office of chief judge rotates among the district court judges. To be chief, a judge must have been in active service on the court for at least one year, be under the age of 65, and have not previously served as chief judge.

A vacancy is filled by the judge highest in seniority among the group of qualified judges. The chief judge serves for a term of seven years, or until age 70, whichever occurs first. The age restrictions are waived if no members of the court would otherwise be qualified for the position.

When the office was created in 1948, the chief judge was the longest-serving judge who had not elected to retire, on what has since 1958 been known as senior status, or declined to serve as chief judge. After August 6, 1959, judges could not become or remain chief after turning 70 years old. The current rules have been in operation since October 1, 1982.

== Succession of seats ==
Seat 1
Seat established on September 24, 1789 by 1 Stat. 73
Sewall	1789–1818
Parris	1818–1822
Ware	1822–1866
Fox	1866–1881
Webb	1882–1902
Hale	1902–1922
Peters	1922–1947
Clifford, Jr.	1947–1956
Gignoux	1957–1983
Carter	1983–2003
Woodcock, Jr.	2003–2017
Walker	2018–present

Seat 2
Seat established on October 20, 1978 by 92 Stat. 1629
Mitchell	1979–1980
Cyr	1981–1989
Hornby	1990–2010
Torresen	2011–2025
vacant	2025–present

Seat 3
Seat established on December 1, 1990 by 104 Stat. 5089
Brody	1991–2000
Singal	2000–2013
Levy	2014–2024
Neumann	2024–present

== U.S. Attorneys ==
- William Lithgow Jr. 1789-96
- Daniel Davis 1796–1801
- Silas Lee 1801–14
- William Pitt Preble 1814–20
- Ether Shepley 1820–33
- John Anderson 1833–37
- Joseph Howard 1837–41
- John Holmes 1841–43
- Gorham Parks 1843–45
- Augustine Haines 1845–48
- George F. Shepley 1848–49
- Thomas A. Deblois 1849–53
- George F. Shepley 1853–61
- George F. Talbot 1861–70
- Nathan Webb 1870–78
- Wilbur F. Lunt 1878–85
- George E. Bird 1886–90
- Issac W. Dyer 1890–94
- Albert W. Bradbury 1894–98
- Issac W. Dyer 1898–1906
- Robert T. Whitehouse 1906–14
- Stephen C. Perry 1914–15
- John F. A. Merrill 1915–22
- Frederick R. Dyer 1922–33
- John D. Clifford 1933–47
- Edward J. Harrington 1947
- Alton A. Lessard 1947–53
- Peter Mills 1953–61
- Alton A. Lessard 1961–65
- William E. McKinley Jr. 1965
- Lloyd P. LaFountain 1966–69
- Peter Mills 1969–77
- George J. Mitchell 1977–79
- James W. Brannigan Jr. 1979–80
- Thomas E. Delahanty II 1980–81
- Richard S. Cohen 1981–93
- Jay P. McCloskey 1993–2001
- Paula D. Silsby 2001-2010
- Thomas E. Delahanty II 2010–2017
- Halsey Frank 2017–2024
- Darcie N. McElwee 2021–2025
- Craig M. Wolff 2025
- Andrew B. Benson 2025-Present

== See also ==
- Courts of Maine
- List of current United States district judges
- List of United States federal courthouses in Maine
- Maine Supreme Judicial Court
