= List of speakers of the Maine House of Representatives =

Speaker of the Maine House of Representatives
- Great Seal of Maine
- Incumbent; Ryan Fecteau since December 4, 2024
- Formation: 1820
- First holder: Benjamin Ames

The Speaker of the Maine House of Representatives is the speaker and presiding officer of the Maine House of Representatives, the lower house of the Maine Legislature.

== List of speakers ==
Years	Name	Residence	Party	Notes
1820–1823	Benjamin Ames	Bath	Democratic-Republican	
1824–1825	Benjamin Greene	South Berwick	National Republican	
1825–1828	John Ruggles	Thomaston	Democratic-Republican	
1829–1830	George Evans	Gardiner	National Republican	
1830–1831	Daniel Goodenow	York	National Republican	
1831–1832	John Ruggles	Thomaston	Democratic-Republican	Resigned
1832–1833	Benjamin White	Monmouth	Democratic	
1833–1834	Nathan Clifford	Newfield	Democratic	
1835	Thomas Davee	Blanchard	Democratic	Resigned February 26, 1835
1835–1836	Jonathan Cilley	Thomaston	Democratic	
1837–1838	Hannibal Hamlin	Hampden	Democratic	
1838–1839	Elisha Hunt Allen	Bangor	Whig	
1839–1840	Hannibal Hamlin	Hampden	Democratic	
1841–1842	Josiah S. Little	Portland	Whig	
1842–1843	Charles Andrews	Turner	Democratic	
1843–1844	David Dunn	Poland	Democratic	
1845–1846	Moses Macdonald	Limerick	Democratic	
1846–1847	Ebenezer Knowlton	Montville	Democratic	
1847–1848	Hugh Davis McLellan	Gorham	Democratic	
1849–1850	Samuel Belcher	Farmington	Democratic	
1851–1852	George P. Sewall	Old Town	Democratic	
1853–1854	John C. Talbot, Jr.	Lubec	Democratic	
1854–1855	Noah Smith, Jr.	Calais	Whig	
1855–1856	Sidney Perham	Woodstock	Republican	
1856–1857	Josiah S. Little	Portland	Democratic	
1857–1858	Charles A. Spofford	Deer Isle	Democratic	
1858–1859	Josiah Hayden Drummond	Waterville	Republican	
1859–1860	William T. Johnson	Augusta	Republican	
1860–1861	Frederick A. Pike	Calais	Republican	
1861–1862	James G. Blaine	Augusta	Republican	
1863–1864	Nelson Dingley Jr.	Auburn	Republican	
1865–1866	William Addison Pitt Dillingham	Waterville	Republican	
1866–1867	James Stone	Kennebunk	Republican	
1867–1868	Lewis Barker	Stetson	Republican	
1868–1869	Theodore C. Woodman	Bucksport	Republican	
1869–1870	Josiah Hayden Drummond	Waterville	Republican	
1870–1871	Reuben Foster	Waterville	Republican	
1871–1872	Edwin B. Smith	Saco	Republican	
1872–1873	Frederick Robie	Gorham	Republican	
1873–1874	Edmund F. Webb	Waterville	Republican	
1874–1875	William W. Thomas Jr.	Portland	Republican	
1876–1877	Frederick Robie	Gorham	Republican	
1877–1878	Edward Bowdoin Nealley	Bangor	Republican	
1878–1879	Henry Lord	Bangor	Republican	
1879–1880	Melvin P. Frank	Portland	Democratic	
1881	George E. Weeks	Augusta	Republican	
1881–1882	Liberty H. Hutchinson	Lewiston	Republican	
1882–1884	J. Manchester Haynes	Augusta	Republican	
1884–1886	Charles Hamlin	Bangor	Republican	
1886–1888	Charles E. Littlefield	Rockland	Republican	
1888–1890	Fred Dow	Portland	Republican	
1890–1892	Andrew P. Wiswell	Ellsworth	Republican	
1892–1894	Albert R. Savage	Auburn	Republican	
1894–1896	Llewellyn Powers	Houlton	Republican	
1896–1898	Seth L. Larrabee	Portland	Republican	
1898–1900	Isaiah K. Stetson	Bangor	Republican	
1900–1902	Joseph Homan Manley	Augusta	Republican	
1902–1904	Oscar F. Fellows	Bucksport	Republican	
1904–1906	Morrill N. Drew	Portland	Republican	
1906–1908	Donald A. H. Powers	Houlton	Republican	
1908–1910	George G. Weeks	Fairfield	Republican	
1910–1912	Frank A. Morey	Lewiston	Democratic	
1912–1914	John A. Peters	Ellsworth	Republican	
1914–1916	Herbert W. Trafton	Fort Fairfield	Democratic	
1916–1918	William L. Bonney	Bowdoinham	Republican	
1918–1920	Frank G. Farrington	Augusta	Republican	
1920–1922	Charles P. Barnes	Houlton	Republican	
1922–1924	Frank H. Holley	Anson	Republican	
1924–1926	William Tudor Gardiner	Gardiner	Republican	
1926–1928	Burleigh Martin	Augusta	Republican	
1928–1930	Robert Hale	Portland	Republican	
1930–1932	E. Delmont Merrill	Dover-Foxcroft	Republican	
1932–1934	Franz U. Burkett	Portland	Republican	
1934–1936	Nathaniel Tompkins	Houlton	Republican	
1936–1938	George E. Hill	South Portland	Republican	
1938–1940	D. W. Philbrick	Cape Elizabeth	Republican	
1940–1942	George D. Varney Sr.	Berwick	Republican	
1942–1945	F. Ardine Richardson	Strong	Republican	
1945–1946	George B. Barnes	Houlton	Republican	
1946–1948	John F. Ward	Millinocket	Republican	
1948–1950	Nathaniel M. Haskell	Portland	Republican	
1950–1952	William S. Silsby	Aurora	Republican	
1952–1954	Roswell P. Bates	Orono	Republican	
1954–1956	Willis A. Trafton Jr.	Auburn	Republican	
1956–1960	Joseph T. Edgar	Bar Harbor	Republican	
1960–1962	Vinal G. Good	Sebago	Republican	
1962–1964	David J. Kennedy	Milbridge	Republican	
1964–1966	Dana Childs	Portland	Democratic	
1966–1972	David J. Kennedy	Milbridge	Republican	
1972–1974	Richard Hewes	Cape Elizabeth	Republican	
1974–1994	John L. Martin	Eagle Lake	Democratic	Resigned as Speaker February 2, 1994
1994–1996	Dan Gwadosky	Fairfield	Democratic	Elected Speaker January 25, 1994
1996–1998	Libby Mitchell	Vassalboro	Democratic	First female House Speaker
1998–2000	G. Steven Rowe	Portland	Democratic	
2000–2002	Michael V. Saxl	Portland	Democratic	
2002–2004	Patrick Colwell	Gardiner	Democratic	
2004–2006	John G. Richardson	Brunswick	Democratic	
2006–2008	Glenn Cummings	Portland	Democratic	
2008–2010	Hannah Pingree	North Haven	Democratic	
2010–2012	Robert Nutting	Oakland	Republican	
2012–2016	Mark Eves	North Berwick	Democratic	
2016–2020	Sara Gideon	Freeport	Democratic	First Asian-American Speaker
2020–2022	Ryan Fecteau	Biddeford	Democratic	First openly gay Speaker
2022–2024	Rachel Talbot Ross	Portland	Democratic	First African-American Speaker
2024–	Ryan Fecteau	Biddeford	Democratic	

== See also ==
- List of Maine state legislatures
