= Senator Katz =

Senator Katz may refer to:

- Bennett Katz (1918–2007), Maine State Senate
- Roger Katz (born c. 1950s), Maine State Senate
