= Masonic Hall (Augusta, Maine) =

- U.S. National Register of Historic Places
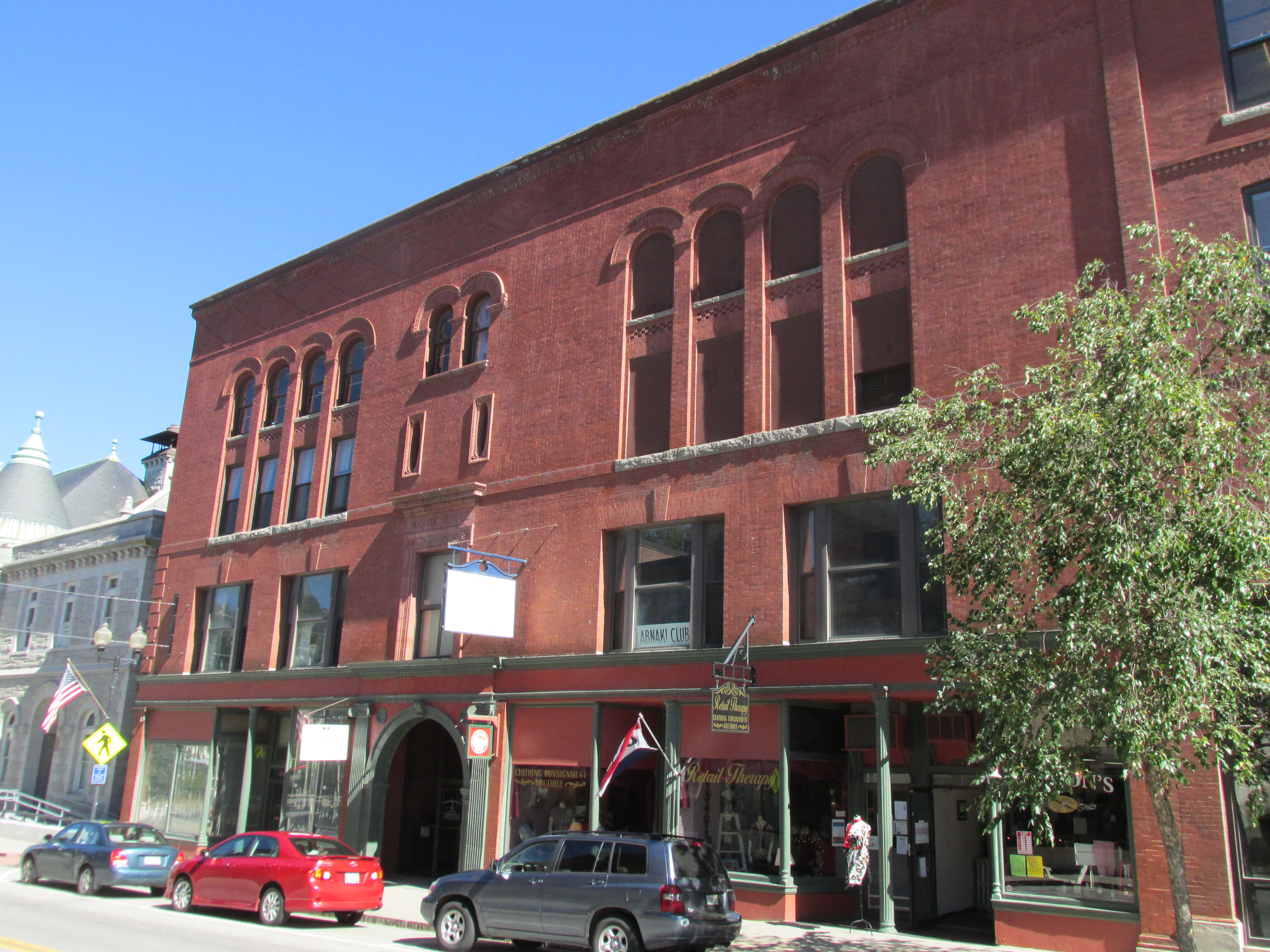
- Masonic Temple

- Location within Maine Location within the United States
- Location: 313–321 Water St., Augusta, Maine
- Coordinates: 44°18′51″N 69°46′30″W
- Area: 0.3 acres (0.12 ha)
- Built: 1894
- Architect: Spofford, John
- Architectural style: Renaissance
- MPS: Augusta Central Business District MRA
- NRHP reference No.: 86001695
- Added to NRHP: May 02, 1986

The Masonic Hall is a historic commercial and fraternal society building at 313-321 Water Street in downtown Augusta, Maine. Built in 1894, it is a significant work of Boston architect John Spofford, and a good local example of restrained Renaissance Revival architecture. It was listed on the National Register of Historic Places in 1986.

== Description and history ==
The Masonic Hall is located on the east side of Water Street, Augusta's principal downtown thoroughfare, a short way south of the junction with Winthrop Street. The building is a four-story masonry structure, built out of red brick with some granite trim. The ground floor has five storefronts, each with display windows and a recessed entrance to one side. Near the center of the building is the main entrance, set in a round-arch opening flanked by fluted pilasters. The second floor has rectangular keystoned window openings, each of which has a recessed polygonal bay window. Windows on the third and fourth floors are grouped together in columns, with patterned brickwork between, and a rounded arch above. A patterned entablature separates the upper windows from a simple cornice. The windows above the main entrance are more ornately decorated than the others.

The hall was built in 1894 to a design by Boston architect John Spofford, and is a modest and restrained interpretation of the Renaissance Revival. Spofford was at the time already well known for several commissions in Maine, include an expansion of the Maine State House, the Former Augusta City Hall, and the ornate Vickery Building, also in downtown Augusta.

== See also ==
- National Register of Historic Places listings in Kennebec County, Maine
