= Senator Barker =

Senator Barker may refer to:

- Ed Barker (politician) (1935–2025), Georgia State Senate
- George Barker (Virginia politician) (born 1951), Virginia State Senate
- H. W. Barker (1860–1950), Wisconsin State Senate
- Jacob Barker (1779–1871), New York State Senate
- James A. Barker (1858–1943), Wisconsin State Senate
- John Jack Barker (1852–1927), Oklahoma State Senate
- Lewis Barker (Maine politician) (1818–1890), Maine State Senate
- Robert L. Barker (died 2010), North Carolina State Senate
- W. Onico Barker (1934–2023), Virginia State Senate
