= 1948 Minnesota gubernatorial election =

- November 2, 1948
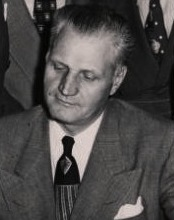

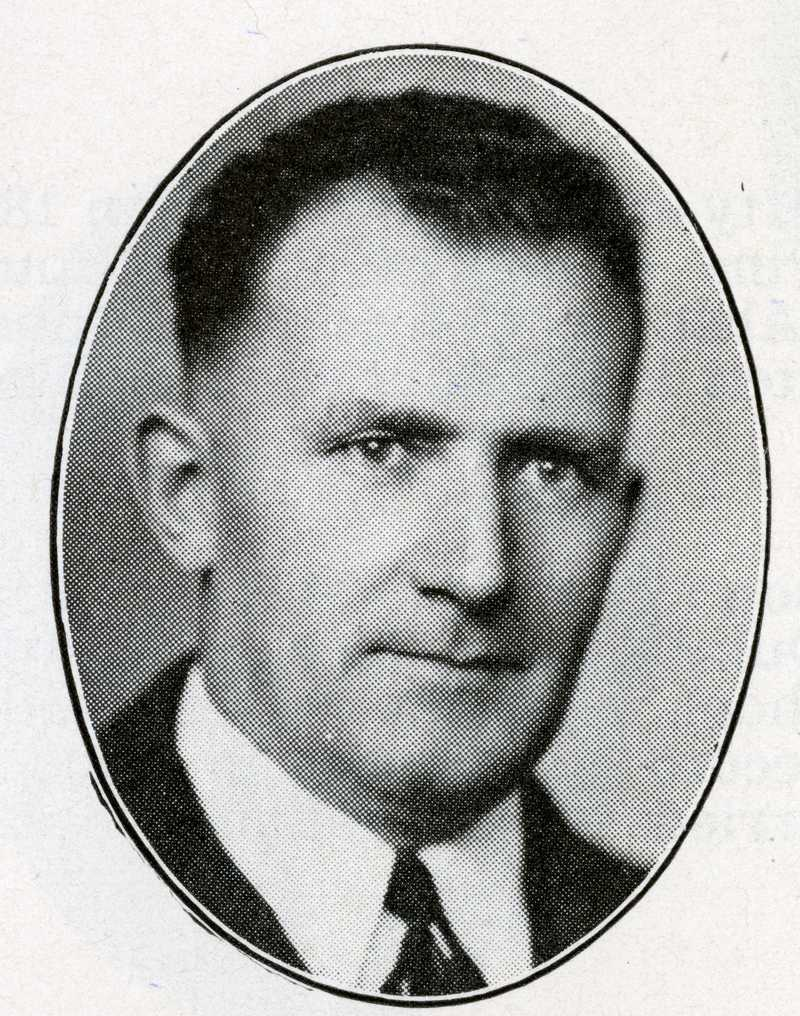
Nominee	Luther Youngdahl	Charles Halsted
Party	Republican	Democratic (DFL)
Popular vote	643,572	545,766
Percentage	53.15%	45.07%
- County results Youngdahl: 40–50% 50–60% 60–70% 70–80% Halsted: 40–50% 50–60% 60–70%
Governor before election
Luther Youngdahl
Republican
Elected Governor
Luther Youngdahl
Republican

The 1948 Minnesota gubernatorial election took place on November 2, 1948. Republican Luther Youngdahl was elected to a second term, defeating Minnesota Democratic–Farmer–Labor Party challenger Charles Halsted.

== Republican primary ==
Luther Youngdahl was renominated. Stafford King was Youngdahl's main opposition. King accused Youngdahl of ruling the Republican Party by dictation. King waited until the final hours of the campaign registration window to file. His campaign came as a surprise, despite the known opposition between Youngdahl and King. King had previously changed his mind multiple times as to whether he would run. King's campaign was centered around deregulation of certain industries, notably a campaign to attempt to legalize gambling. King called the ban an "insidious encroachment of centralized authority upon local, county and state's rights."

Former governor Harold Stassen put his support behind Youngdahl. Stassen did not criticize King, or even mention him, in his endorsement letter.

=== Candidates ===
==== Nominated ====
- Luther Youngdahl, incumbent

=== Eliminated in primary ===
- W. Eugene Cooper, plumber
- William Daley, attorney
- Golden Davis, farmhand
- Stafford King, Minnesota state auditor
- Walt Werner, salesman

=== Results ===
Republican Party of Minnesota primary results
Party	Candidate	Votes	%
Republican	Luther Youngdahl	215,754	57.84%
Republican	Stafford King	148,636	39.84%
Republican	William Daley	2,646	0.71%
Republican	Walt Werner	2,344	0.63%
Republican	W. Eugene Cooper	1,939	0.52%
Republican	Golden Davis	1,722	0.46%
Total votes		373,041	100.00%

== Democratic-Farmer-Labor primary ==
The Republican party had held the governor's office since 1939. In 1944, the Democratic-Farmer-Labor Party (DFL) was founded as the main opposition against the Republicans. That year, Byron G. Allen, a member of the liberal wing of the DFL, was nominated. Following his defeat, Harold H. Barker, a member of the leftist wing of the party, was nominated. His campaign was also unsuccessful. With both wings of the party having been defeated electorally, the DFL soon found itself internally divided. Charles Halsted was nominated, supported by the right-wing faction of the party, then led by Hubert Humphrey.

=== Candidates ===
==== Nominated ====
- Charles Halsted, former member of the Minnesota House of Representatives

=== Eliminated in primary ===
- Edgar Bernard, farmer, Republican primary candidate in 1934; Farmer-Labor primary candidate in 1936, 1940, 1942; and DFL primary candidate in 1946
- Walter Johnson, state chair of the Progressive Party
- Ray G. Moonan, attorney
- Francis L. Murphy, painter and 1944 nominee for lieutenant governor
- John Leo Nolan, small business owner

=== Results ===
Republican Party of Minnesota primary results
Party	Candidate	Votes	%
Democratic (DFL)	Charles Halsted	80,901	35.96%
Democratic (DFL)	Ray G. Moonan	48,795	21.69%
Democratic (DFL)	Walter Johnson	37,004	16.45%
Democratic (DFL)	Francis L. Murphy	33,113	14.72%
Democratic (DFL)	John Leo Nolan	14,117	6.28%
Democratic (DFL)	Edgar Bernard	11,022	4.90%
Total votes		224,952	100.00%

== Candidates ==
- Rudolph Gustafson, plumber (Industrial Government)
- Charles Halsted, member of the Minnesota House of Representatives (DFL)
- Orville Olson, head of Independent Voters of Minnesota (Prohibition)
- Luther Youngdahl, incumbent (Republican)

== Campaigns ==
Youngdahl intended to desegregate the Minnesota National Guard. He considered segregation a "shame and disgrace" and a suitable cause to drive people towards communism. He was supported in the law by Minnesota Attorney General and former governor Joseph A. A. Burnquist.

Halsted campaigned on a platform that the two biggest issues of the day were healthcare access and housing. He noted the scarcity in access to medical care in rural regions, with some medical buildings being nothing more than a single room. In the far north of the state, distances to the nearest hospital became as great as 100 miles. Halsted stated that the funds to build new hospitals were available, but no action had been taken to use the funds.

== Results ==
1948 gubernatorial election, Minnesota
Party	Candidate	Votes	%	±%
Republican	Luther Youngdahl (incumbent)	643,572	53.15%	−5.81%
Democratic (DFL)	Charles Halsted	545,766	45.07%	+5.36%
Prohibition	Orville Olson	14,950	1.23%	n/a
Industrial Government	Rudolph Gustafson	6,598	0.54%	−0.79%
Majority		97,806	8.08%	
Turnout		1,210,886		
Republican hold		Swing		

== See also ==
- List of Minnesota gubernatorial elections
