= George Babb =

George Babb may refer to:

- George Herbert Babb (1864–1950), member of the Maine Senate
- George Fletcher Babb (1835–1915), American architect
