= Harry Barker =

Harry Barker may refer to:

- Harry Barker Reserve, a cricket ground near Gisborne, New Zealand, named after a former mayor
- Harry Barker (mayor) (1898–1994), mayor of Gisborne, New Zealand
- Harry Barker (business)

== See also ==
- Harold Barker (disambiguation)
- Henry Barker (disambiguation)
