= Lewis Barker =

Lewis Barker may refer to:

- Lewis Barker (Maine politician) (1818–1890), American lawyer and politician
- Lewis Barker (Illinois politician), American politician, member of the Illinois Senate
- Lewis Barker (Australian Army officer) (1895–1981), Australian Army brigadier
