= Ernest Joseph Dennen =

Ernest Joseph Dennen (September 6, 1866 – January 22, 1937) was an American Episcopal clergyman. He was the founder and supreme director of the Order of Sir Galahad, which was an organization for Anglican and Episcopal boys and men. In 1906, he founded the Order's summer camp, Camp O-AT-KA in Sebago, Maine. He was also the author of several books, including Introduction to the Prayer Book, 1906; The Sunday School Under Scientific Management, 1914; The Manual for Leaders (booklet for The Order of Sir Galahad), 1921.

== Family and early life ==
The son of Charles Oscar and Josephine (Day) D., he was born in Naugatuck, Connecticut on September 6, 1866. Dennen earned a B.A. from University of Michigan in 1893 and a Bachelor of Divinity from the Episcopal Divinity School in Cambridge, Massachusetts in 1896. He became a Deacon in 1895 and a priest in 1896. On November 17, 1903, he married Anna Blake Hayden. The couple had four children—Anna Hayden, Elizabeth Blake, William Ives, and Susan Williams.

== Professional life ==
He worked as an assistant at St. Stephen's Episcopal church in Boston, St. John's Church in East Boston, and Trinity Church in Newport, Rhode Island until 1905. From 1905 to 1914, he served as rector of St. Stephen's Memorial Episcopal Church in Lynn, Massachusetts. In 1914, he became the archdeacon of Boston. From 1927 to 1929, he was rector of Christ Church in the City of Boston (better known as the Old North Church). From 1929 until the end of his life, he served on staff at Boston's Cathedral Church of St. Paul. He suffered a heart attack in September 1936 and died suddenly the following January. More than 1,500 people attended his funeral services at the Cathedral Church of St. Paul.
