= Michael V. Saxl =

American lawyer and politician

Speaker of the Maine House of Representatives
- In office December 6, 2000 – December 4, 2002
- Preceded by: G. Steven Rowe
- Succeeded by: Patrick Colwell

Majority Leader of the Maine House of Representatives
- In office December 3, 1998 – December 6, 2000
- Preceded by: Carol Kontos
- Succeeded by: Patrick Colwell

Member of the Maine House of Representatives from the 31st district
- In office March 1, 1995 – December 4, 2002
- Preceded by: James V. Oliver
- Succeeded by: John Eder

Personal details
- Party: Democratic
- Education: Bowdoin College (AB); University of Maine (JD)
- Profession: Lawyer

Michael V. Saxl is American lawyer and former politician from Maine. Saxl, who lived in Portland's West End, was a member of the Maine House of Representatives from the 117th – 120th legislatures (1995–2002). He was Speaker of the Maine House of Representatives from 2001–02. He is a Democrat.

Saxl, a native of Bangor, was elected in a special election in February 1995 to replace Jim Oliver, who resigned to join the Peace Corps. He won 61% of the vote, beating both a Republican and a Green Independent. He was a second year law student at the time of election and son of fellow State Representative Jane Saxl of Bangor.

Saxl was elected Speaker of the Maine House of Representatives at the age of 33, the youngest Speaker since John L. Martin was elected at 32.

After leaving the Maine House of Representatives, Saxl became a lobbyist, including Winter Harbor Properties, a real estate firm.

== Positions ==
Saxl opposed term limits for elected officials in Maine.

Maine House of Representatives
| Preceded by James V. Oliver | Member of the Maine House of Representatives from the 31st district 1995–2002 | Succeeded by John Eder |
| Preceded by Carol Kontos | Majority Leader of the Maine House of Representatives; 1998–2000 | Succeeded by Patrick Colwell |
Political offices
| Preceded by G. Steven Rowe | Speaker of the Maine House of Representatives; 2000–2002 | Succeeded by Patrick Colwell |
