= Harold Barker =

Harold Barker may refer to:

- Harold Barker (rower) (1886–1937), British rower
- Harold H. Barker (1889–1949), American politician
- Gregg Barton (1912–2000), real name Harold Barker, American actor

== See also ==
- Harry Barker (disambiguation)
