= 1950 Minnesota gubernatorial election =

- November 7, 1950
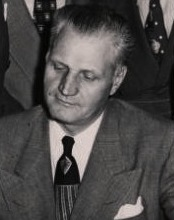

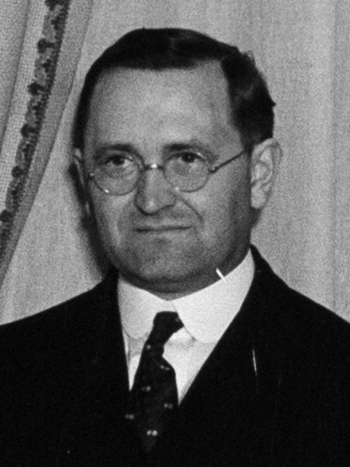
Nominee	Luther Youngdahl	Harry H. Peterson
Party	Republican	Democratic (DFL)
Popular vote	635,800	400,637
Percentage	60.75%	38.28%
- County results Youngdahl: 50–60% 60–70% 70–80% Peterson: 40–50% 50–60%
Governor before election
Luther Youngdahl
Republican
Elected Governor
Luther Youngdahl
Republican

The 1950 Minnesota gubernatorial election took place on November 7, 1950. Republican incumbent Luther Youngdahl defeated Minnesota Democratic–Farmer–Labor Party challenger Harry H. Peterson. Youngdahl secured a third term in office.

== Republican primary ==
Youngdahl was renominated.

=== Candidates ===
==== Nominated ====
- Luther Youngdahl, incumbent

==== Eliminated in primary ====
- Arthur B. Gilbert, president of the Recovery League of Minnesota
- John Haluska, hotel clerk
- Walter G. Olson, golf course manager
- August Scramstad, railroad tower worker

=== Results ===
Republican Party of Minnesota primary results
Party	Candidate	Votes	%
Republican	Luther Youngdahl	309,022	89.79%
Republican	Walter G. Olson	13,456	3.91%
Republican	Arthur B. Gilbert	10,156	2.95%
Republican	August Scramstad	6,230	1.81%
Republican	John Haluska	5,307	1.54%
Total votes		344,171	100%

== Democratic-Farmer-Labor primary ==
Peterson was nominated, defeating 1948 nominee Charles Halsted. Halsted, a member of the party's right wing, accused Peterson of being a communist. Peterson's campaign dispelled the accusations by pointing out that former governor Floyd Olson was also accused of communism, and that the actual Communist Party had denounced Peterson as "capitalistic". Following his defeat in the primary, Halsted endorsed Peterson.

=== Candidates ===
==== Nominated ====
- Harry H. Peterson, former Minnesota attorney general and judge on the Minnesota Supreme Court

==== Eliminated in primary ====
- James Dougherty, switchman
- Charles Halsted, former member of the Minnesota House of Representatives
- Hjalmar Petersen, former governor
- August Peterson, ironworker
- Joseph A. Ryan

=== Results ===
Minnesota Democratic-Farmer-Labor primary results
Party	Candidate	Votes	%
Democratic (DFL)	Harry H. Peterson	107,357	47.48%
Democratic (DFL)	Charles Halsted	59,279	26.22%
Democratic (DFL)	Hjalmar Petersen	24,569	10.87%
Democratic (DFL)	Joseph A. Ryan	14,643	6.48%
Democratic (DFL)	James Dougherty	10,423	4.61%
Democratic (DFL)	August Peterson	9,853	4.36%
Total votes		344,171	100%

== Candidates ==
- Vernon Campbell, beauty shop proprietor (Industrial Government)
- Harry H. Peterson, former Minnesota attorney general and judge on the Minnesota Supreme Court (DFL)
- Luther Youngdahl, incumbent (Republican)

== Campaigns ==
Youngdahl received support from the presidents of Gustavus Adolphus College, St. Olaf College, Carleton College, Hamline University, Augsburg College, and Macalester College.

Youngdahl expanded his ongoing campaign against gambling in the state. His administration had already enacted strict regulations on gambling. He believed that continuing his campaign against gambling would succeed in curbing the organized crime which he claimed relied on it for income.

Peterson attempted to appeal to the labor vote, including small business owners, and members of cooperatives. He claimed that Republicans were fiscally irresponsible, and that taxes were unfairly placed on the individual while lifted on businesses.

Peterson intended to expand the tourism industry in Minnesota. He felt that Minnesota was falling behind Wisconsin an Michigan and not properly capitalizing on potential tourists from the Great Plains.

On October 17, 1950, the St. Paul League of Women Voters organized a shared event attended by Peterson and Youngdahl. Each candidate had the opportunity to give a 15-minute speech, and to take questions from the audience.

=== Polling ===
This was the third gubernatorial election in Minnesota in which a straw poll was conducted. The previous one was conducted in 1934. The poll predicted a nearly tied election, with 11,003 straw votes for Peterson and 11,005 straw votes for Youngdahl.

Poll source	Date(s) administered	Sample size	Margin of error	Harry Peterson (DFL)	Luther Youngdahl (R)
Jack Lyon's Annual Straw Ballot	August 30 – September 1, 1950	22,008	–	49.995%	50.005%

== Results ==
1950 gubernatorial election, Minnesota
Party	Candidate	Votes	%	±%
Republican	Luther Youngdahl (incumbent)	635,800	60.75%	+7.59%
Democratic (DFL)	Harry H. Peterson	400,637	38.28%	−6.79%
Industrial Government	Vernon Campbell	10,195	0.97%	+0.43%
Majority		235,163	22.47%	
Turnout		1,046,632		
Republican hold		Swing		

== See also ==
- List of Minnesota gubernatorial elections
