= Henry Barker =

Henry Barker may refer to:

- Henry Barker (athlete) (1871–1944), British Olympic athlete
- Henry Alfred Barker (1858–1940), English socialist activist
- Henry Aston Barker (1774–1856), Scottish artist
- Henry Francis Barker, state legislator and granite businessman in Massachusetts who lived in the Henry F. Barker House
- Henry Raine Barker (1829–1902), English lawyer, banker and rower
- Henry Stites Barker (1850–1928), American university administrator, lawyer and judge
- Henry Rodman Barker (1841–1901), mayor of Providence, Rhode Island
- Henry Barker (canon) (1657–1740), Canon of Westminster
- H. W. Barker (1860–1950), American politician

== See also ==
- Edmund Henry Barker (1788–1839), English classical scholar
- Harry Barker (disambiguation)
