= Morrill N. Drew =

Corporate attorney, businessman and Politician from America

Member of the Maine House of Representatives
- In office 1903–1906

Personal details
- Born: May 17, 1862
- Died: September 25, 1917 (aged 55)
- Party: Republican
- Profession: Lawyer, Businessperson

Morrill N. Drew (May 17, 1862 – September 25, 1917) was an American corporate lawyer, businessperson, and politician from Maine. A Republican from Portland, Drew served two terms in the Maine House of Representatives (1903 – 1906). In his second term, he was elected Speaker.

In 1891, he was a founding member of the Maine State Bar Association.

His former home, the Morrill N. Drew House, is located at 143 Vaughan Street near Portland's Western Promenade. It was commissioned by the Drew family and designed by local architect John Calvin Stevens, who also designed many of the other mansions in the neighborhood. He died in the home in September 1917. The building was restored in 2011 and honored with an award in 2012 by Maine Preservation.
