= James V. Oliver =

American politician

Member of the Maine House of Representatives
- In office 1986–1994
- Succeeded by: Michael V. Saxl

Personal details
- Party: Democratic

James V. Oliver is an American politician from Maine. Oliver represented Portland, Maine in the Maine House of Representatives from 1986 to 1994, when he accepted a Country Director position with the Peace Corps. He was replaced in a special election by Michael V. Saxl.

From 1967 to 1994, Oliver served as executive director of the Portland West Neighborhood Planning Council. In 1994, Oliver resigned his position with Pirtland West to accept a position overseas as a Peace Corps Country Director for two South American countries: Suriname and Guyana.

In May 1986, as executive director of Portland West, Oliver was involved in the successful referendum prohibiting further development on Portland's working waterfront.

In 1988, Oliver was one of 7 Portland residents arrested while protesting the demolition of a nineteenth-century building on Park Street in the West End. The historic building was demolished shortly after their arrests. Not long afterwards, the Portland City Council voted to strengthen the law protecting Historic Buildings from demolition by stipulating demolition was only allowed to occur if a historic building is beyond repair or dangerous to the public.
