= Camp O-AT-KA =

Christian summer camp

Coordinates: 43.8752°N 70.6328°W

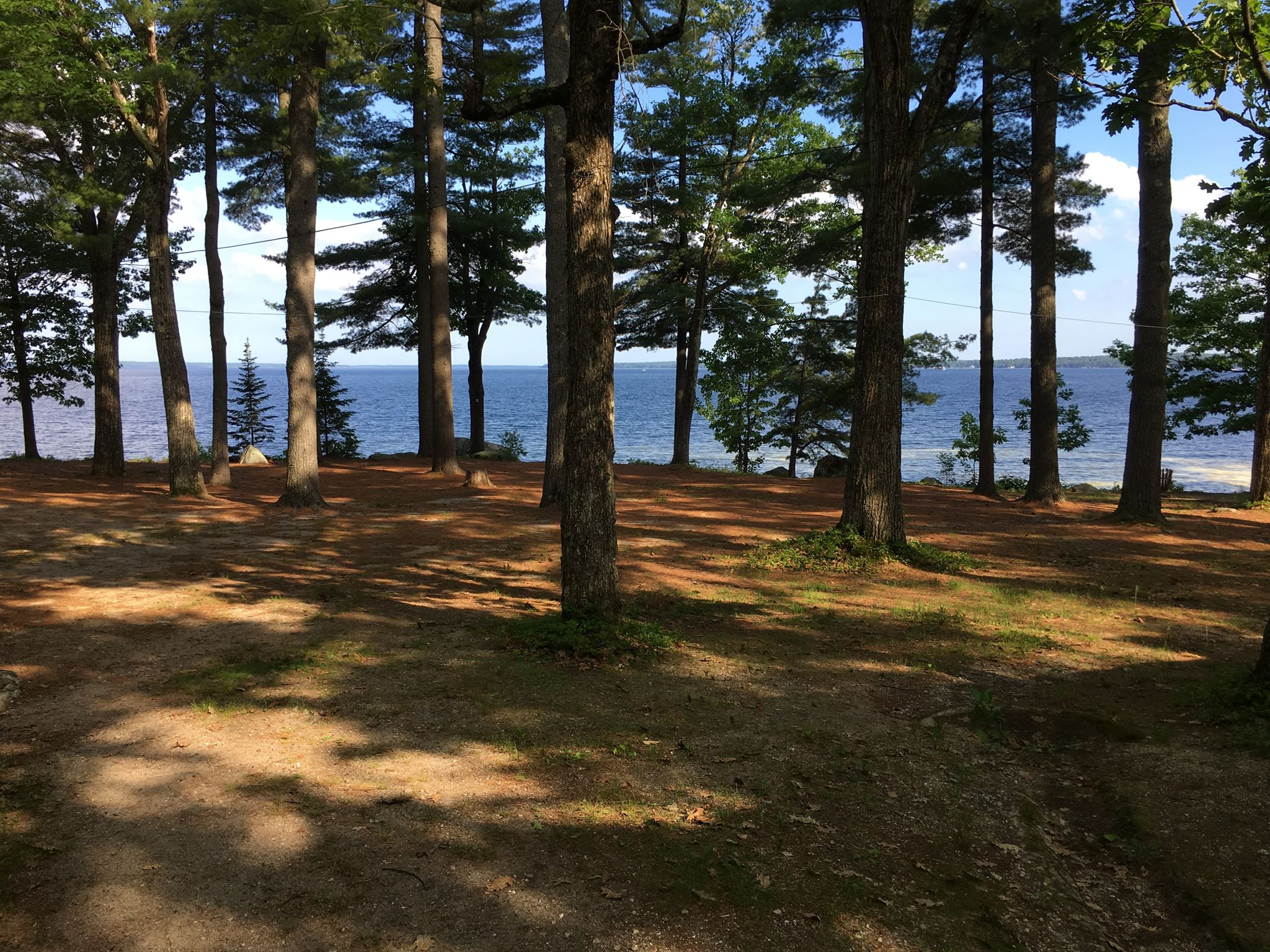
- A wooded clearing next to O-AT-KA's main office building looking out on Lake Sebago
- Interactive map of Camp O-AT-KA
- Website: campoatka.org

Camp O-AT-KA is a non-profit summer camp for boys in East Sebago, Maine, on the western shore of Sebago Lake.

It runs as a traditional summer camp for boys aged 7-16 and is accredited with the American Camp Association.

== History ==
It was founded in 1906 by Rev. Ernest Joseph Dennen of Lynn, Massachusetts as the summer camp of the Order of Sir Galahad, an Episcopal church organization founded by Dennen in 1896. Originally founded as an explicitly Episcopal camp, O-AT-KA allowed Jewish campers as well. In the modern period, it is open to campers of all backgrounds.

== Off-season events ==
During the off-season, O-AT-KA is a popular venue for weddings and other events. It was featured on Martha Stewart's website, described as making one "feel like you stepped into a Wes Anderson film."

== Alumni ==
- Christopher Ross, sculptor and designer
