= Charles P. Nelson (Maine politician) =

American politician

Charles P. "Charlie" Nelson
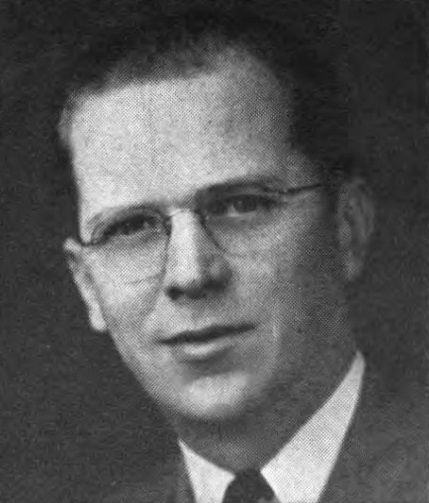

Member of the U.S. House of Representatives from Maine's 2nd district
- In office January 3, 1949 – January 3, 1957
- Preceded by: Margaret Chase Smith
- Succeeded by: Frank M. Coffin

Personal details
- Born: July 2, 1907 Waterville, Maine
- Died: June 8, 1962 (aged 54) Augusta, Maine
- Citizenship: United States
- Party: Republican
- Education: Colby College; Harvard Law School
- Profession: Attorney

Military service
- Allegiance: United States
- Branch/service: United States Army Air Corps
- Years of service: 1942 to 1946
- Rank: second lieutenant; lieutenant colonel
- Battles/wars: World War II; European Theater of Operations

Charles Pembroke Nelson (July 2, 1907 – June 8, 1962) was an American politician and a member of the US House of Representatives from Maine.

== Biography ==
Born in Waterville, Maine, on July 2, 1907, Nelson was the son of Nelson, John Edward and Margaret Heath Nelson. He graduated from Cony High School in Augusta, Maine, and from Colby College in Waterville. Later, he attended Harvard Law School, earning his Juris Doctor.

== Career ==
Nelson was secretary to his father, Representative John E. Nelson. The younger Nelson engaged in the general practice of law in Augusta, Maine, from 1932 to 1933, then worked as city solicitor of Augusta from 1934 to 1942. He was the chief of the State Arson Division in 1941 and 1942.

Nelson entered the military service in 1942 as a second lieutenant in the United States Army Air Corps during World War II. He served in the armed forces until discharge in 1946 as a lieutenant colonel with two years of service in the European Theater of Operations. He remained a member of the National Guard and Reserves after leaving the military. He was a member of the State board of bar examiners from 1946 to 1948. He was also mayor of Augusta in 1947 and 1948.

Elected as a Republican to the Eighty-first and to the three succeeding Congresses, Nelson served from January 3, 1949, to January 3, 1957. He retired in 1957 and became a teacher at the University of Florida for two years. He was also chief trial attorney of the State highway commission in 1959, and moderator of the town of West Bath 1960.

== Death ==
Nelson died in Augusta, Maine, on June 8, 1962 (age 54 years, 341 days). His remains were cremated, and the ashes interred on family property at Georgetown, Maine.

== See also ==
- List of mayors of Augusta, Maine

U.S. House of Representatives
Preceded by Margaret Chase Smith	Member of the U.S. House of Representatives from Maine's 2nd congressional district January 3, 1949 – January 3, 1957	Succeeded by Frank M. Coffin
