= Vinal G. Good =

American politician and lawyer

Member of the Maine House of Representatives
- In office 1959–1962

Member of the Maine Senate
- In office 1967–1968

Personal details
- Born: January 6, 1906 Houlton, Maine, U.S.
- Died: December 23, 2000 (aged 94) Sebago, Maine, U.S.
- Party: Republican
- Education: Colby College; Northeastern University School of Law
- Occupation: Insurance agent
- Profession: Attorney

Vinal G. Good (January 6, 1906 – December 23, 2000) was an American politician and lawyer from Maine. A Republican from Sebago, Maine, Good served 6 years in the Maine Legislature. He was initially elected in 1958 to the Maine House of Representatives. Re-elected in 1960, Vinal was elected Speaker of the Maine House of Representatives in January 1961 after spending the previous summer traveling the state meeting fellow house members.

Good was born in Houlton, Maine on January 6, 1906. He graduated from Colby College and Northeastern University School of Law before joining the U.S. Army's 10th Mountain Division during World War II. His unit was based in Colorado during the war. After leaving the Army, he served in the Judge Advocate General's Corps, United States Army at Fort George G. Meade in Maryland.

Leaving the military, he and his wife moved back to Maine and established the Sebago Agency in the town of Sebago, Maine.
