= Josiah S. Little =

American politician

Josiah S. Little (July 9, 1801 - April 2, 1862) was an American politician from Maine. Little was the 39th Speaker of the Maine House of Representatives. He was speaker in 1841 both and 1856. In 1841, Little was elected as a Whig and as a Democrat in 1856. He was from Portland, Maine.
