= George G. Weeks =

American politician (1860–1923)

Speaker of the Maine House of Representatives
- In office 1909–1910
- Preceded by: Donald A. H. Powers
- Succeeded by: Frank A. Morey

Personal details
- Born: April 14, 1860 Fairfield, Maine, U.S.
- Died: November 21, 1923 (aged 63) Portland, Maine, U.S.
- Resting place: Maplewood Cemetery; Fairfield, Maine, U.S.
- Party: Republican
- Education: Bowdoin College
- Occupation: Lawyer

George Granville Weeks (April 14, 1860 – November 21, 1923) was an American lawyer and politician who was Speaker of the Maine House of Representatives from 1909 to 1910.

== Biography ==
Weeks was born in Fairfield, Maine, on April 14, 1860, to George G. and Lucy (Howard) Weeks. He was educated in the Fairfield public schools and graduated from Bowdoin College with a bachelor's degree in 1882. He studied law in the office of D. A. McFadden and was admitted to the bar in 1885.

In 1887, Weeks married Lottie E. Friend of Carmel, Maine. They had three children – Harold, Helen, and Lucy. Harold Weeks was admitted to the bar in 1912 and formed the firm of Weeks & Weeks with his father. Their clients included the National Bank of Fairfield, Fairfield Savings Bank, Shawmut Manufacturing Company, United Paper Board Company, Fairfield Development Company, and Fairfield and Shawmut Railway.

Weeks was Fairfield's superintendent of schools and a member of the board of selectmen and board of assessors. Weeks served three terms (1893, 1897, and 1909) in the Maine House of Representatives and two (1889 and 1902) in the Maine Senate. He was Speaker of the House during his final term. It was rumored that he would challenge incumbent governor William T. Haines for the Republican nomination in the 1914 Maine gubernatorial election, but chose not to enter the race.

On November 21, 1923, Weeks had a heart attack while checking into a hotel in Portland, Maine. He died on the way to the hospital.
