= Roger Katz =

American politician

Member of the Maine Senate from the 15th district
- In office December 3, 2014 – December 5, 2018
- Preceded by: John J. Cleveland
- Succeeded by: Matthew Pouliot

Member of the Maine Senate from the 24th district
- In office December 8, 2010 – December 3, 2014
- Preceded by: Libby Mitchell
- Succeeded by: Stanley Gerzofsky

Personal details
- Born: Augusta, Maine
- Party: Republican
- Spouse: Ericka Katz
- Profession: Attorney at law

Roger J. Katz (born c. 1950s) is an American politician and lawyer. Katz was a Republican State Senator from Maine's 15th District, representing Augusta, China, Oakland, Sidney and Vassalboro. He was first elected to the Maine State Senate in 2010 after serving from 2006 to 2010 as mayor of the state capital Augusta. He is chaired the Government Oversight committee in the State Senate. A practicing lawyer, he is a partner in the law firm Lipman & Katz in Augusta. In 2010, Katz defeated State Representative Patsy Crockett. Following re-election in November 2012, Katz was elected as Republican Senate assistant minority leader after his party lost majority status to the Democrats.

== Education and family ==
Katz's father, Bennett Katz, served as state senator in the 1960s and 1970s, including a stint as Senate Majority Leader. Roger Katz graduated from Cony High School in Augusta, Maine, where he played on the boys' basketball team, which won the 1973 state championship. He then went on to Harvard College and Boston University Law School. He is Jewish.

== Political career ==
When the Republicans regained the majority in the Senate after the 2014 election, Katz decided not to seek a leadership position in the following legislative session.

Governor Paul LePage called for Katz to resign his chairmanship of the Government Oversight Committee, which investigated LePage for using state funds to force a non-profit to reverse its hiring of Democratic Speaker of the House Mark Eves. LePage said that Katz had a clear conflict of interest due to past public statements against LePage and having already arrived at some conclusions in the investigation. Katz responded by noting that the committee vote to begin the investigation was unanimous. LePage also said Katz was conducting a "witch hunt" against him. Senate President Michael Thibodeau and Majority Leader Garrett Mason each issued statements of support for Katz.

The American Legion's Maine Department awarded Katz its Legislator of the Year award on January 17, 2016, citing what they termed his tireless work for veterans.

Katz opposed Donald Trump in the 2016 election, calling him "not fit to be president".

== See also ==
- List of mayors of Augusta, Maine
