= Order of Sir Galahad =

Christian fraternal order

The Order of Sir Galahad is an organization for Anglican and Episcopal boys and men, founded in Boston in 1896 by the Reverend Ernest Joseph Dennen. The Order's activities are structured around Galahad in Arthurian legend. The Order's summer camp is Camp O-AT-KA in Sebago, Maine.
