= D. W. Philbrick =

American politician from Maine

Donald Ward Philbrick

Speaker of the Maine House of Representatives
- In office 1939–1940
- Preceded by: George Hill
- Succeeded by: George D. Varney Sr.

Member of the Maine House of Representatives from the Cape Elizabeth district
- In office 1935–1940

Personal details
- Born: March 16, 1896 Skowhegan, Maine
- Died: September 1, 1984 (aged 88) Portland, Maine
- Party: Republican
- Education: Bowdoin College (BA); Harvard Law School (LLB)

Donald Ward Philbrick (March 16, 1896 – September 1, 1984) was an American politician who served in the Maine House of Representatives from the Cape Elizabeth district from 1935 to 1940. He served as Speaker of the Maine House of Representatives from 1939 to 1940.
