= Frank A. Morey =

American politician from Maine (1863-1933)

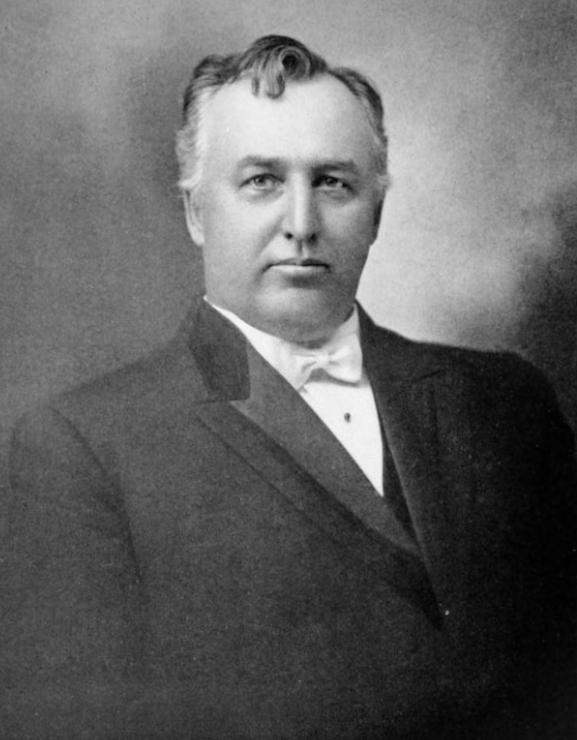

62nd Speaker of the Maine House of Representatives
- In office 1911–1913
- Preceded by: George G. Weeks
- Succeeded by: John A. Peters

32nd Mayor of Lewiston
- In office 1907–1912
- Preceded by: William A. Webster
- Succeeded by: William H. Hines

Member of the Maine House of Representatives from Lewiston
- In office 1899–1907

Member of the Maine Senate
- In office 1913–1915

Personal details
- Born: March 11, 1863 Keeseville, New York, U.S.
- Died: August 16, 1933 (aged 70) New York City, U.S.
- Party: Democratic
- Spouse: Maude Mildred Douglass (m. 1889)
- Children: 1
- Education: Bates College
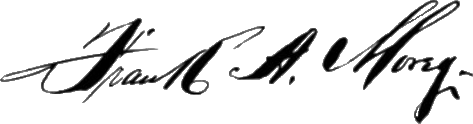
- Signature

Frank Andrew Morey (March 11, 1863 – August 16, 1933) was an American politician who served as the Mayor of Lewiston as a member of the Democratic party as well as serving in the Maine Legislature, including being its speaker.

== Early life ==
Morey was born on March 11, 1863, in Keeseville, New York, to Andrew J. Morey and Elvira Allen. He studied at Keeseville Academy before entering Bates College, graduating in 1885. Morey was admitted to the bar of Maine in 1887 and practiced law in Keeseville before moving to Lewiston, Maine, in 1891. He married Maude Mildred Douglass in June 1889 and the couple went on to have a daughter in 1892.

== Political career ==
Morey was first elected to the Maine House of Representatives in 1899, serving three terms until 1907 when he was elected Mayor of Lewiston. He served as mayor for six consecutive terms, and was also elected Speaker of the Maine House of Representatives during his tenure in 1911. He remained mayor until 1912 and served as speaker until 1913, when he was elected to the Maine Senate. He served in the Senate for a single term from 1913 until 1915, whereafter he retired from politics and focused again on his career as a lawyer.

== Later life and death ==
Besides practicing law, Morey also served as an Overseer of Bates College from 1923 until his death, and was also a Life member of the Boston Marine Society. Morey also owned a farm in Norfolk and was travelling back from his farm to Lewiston when he fell ill on the way. He was taken to Flower Hospital in New York City, where he subsequently died on August 16, 1933, aged 70. He was buried at Riverside Cemetery in Lewiston.

== See also ==
- List of mayors of Lewiston, Maine
