= Patrick Colwell =

American politician

Patrick Colwell (born c. 1951) is an American former politician in the state of Maine. A Democrat, he was Speaker of the Maine House of Representatives from 2003-2004 (121st Maine State Legislature). He previously had served as Majority Leader. He represented Gardiner and part of Randolph in Kennebec County.

== Personal ==
He was married to Rebecca, with whom he has one child. Born in Machias, Maine, he is a ceramic tile contractor by profession. He previously served on the Gardiner City Council for three terms.

Maine House of Representatives
Preceded by Sharon Treat	Member of the Maine House of Representatives from the 91st district 1996–2004	Succeeded by Arlan R. Jodrey
Preceded by Michael V. Saxl	Majority Leader of the Maine House of Representatives; 2000–2002	Succeeded by John G. Richardson
Political offices
Preceded by Michael V. Saxl	Speaker of the Maine House of Representatives; 2002–2004	Succeeded by John G. Richardson
