= Douglas Mountain (Maine) =

Mountain in Maine, United States

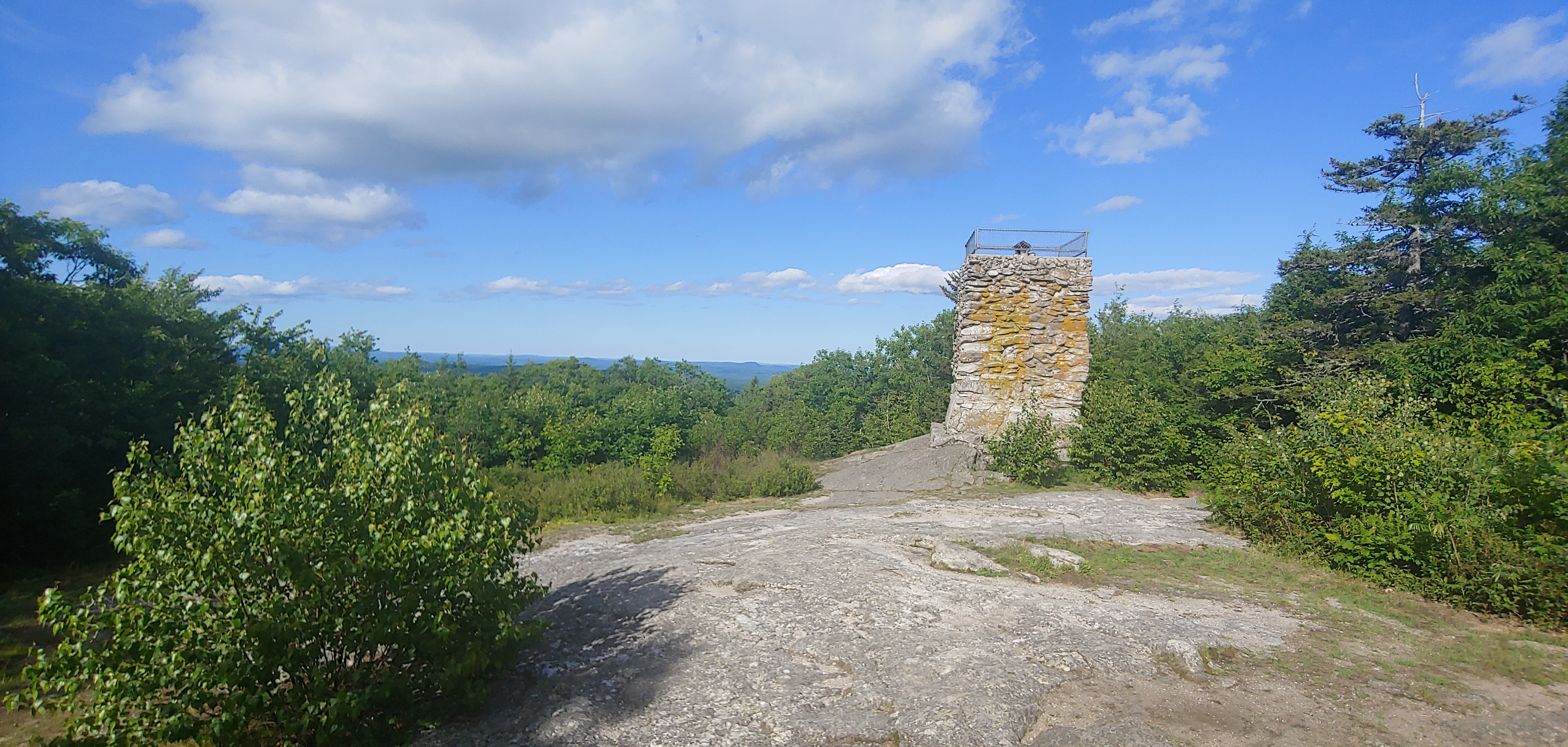
- The summit of Douglas Mountain in Sebago, Maine, United States

Highest point
- Elevation: 1,381 ft (421 m) NAVD 88
- Prominence: 852 ft (260 m)
- Coordinates: 43°52′18″N 70°41′49″W

Geography
- Location within Maine
- Location: Sebago, Cumberland County, Maine, U.S.

Douglas Mountain or Douglas Hill is a small mountain in the towns of Sebago, Maine and Baldwin, Maine in the United States. It is named after early European settlers John and Andrew Douglas and was first settled by United States citizens in the 1830s. It is part of a small range called the Saddleback Hills on the west side of Sebago Lake. The peak of the mountain is the second highest point in Cumberland County, Maine

In 1892, the mountain and surrounding area was purchased by Dr. William Blackman, a New York surgeon. He constructed a sixteen-foot stone tower at the summit, which provides striking panoramic views of Sebago Lake, the Presidential Mountains, and the city of Portland, as well as much of the Western Maine lakes and foothills. The Nature Conservancy later purchased and protected the land from development and later handed over its ownership to the town of Sebago for public recreation.
