= Stanley R. Tupper =

American politician

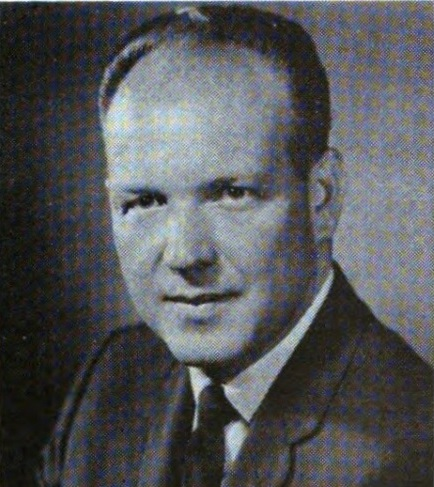

Member of the U.S. House of Representatives from Maine
- In office January 3, 1961 – January 3, 1967
- Preceded by: Frank M. Coffin
- Succeeded by: Peter Kyros
- Constituency: 2nd district (1961-1963); 1st district (1963-1967)

Personal details
- Born: Stanley Roger Tupper; January 25, 1921 Boothbay Harbor, Maine, US
- Died: January 6, 2006 (aged 84) Boothbay Harbor, Maine, US
- Party: Republican
- Education: Middlebury College (BA); La Salle Extension University (JD)
- Profession: Attorney

Stanley Roger Tupper (January 25, 1921 – January 6, 2006) was an American lawyer, World War II veteran, and liberal politician who served three terms as a U.S. representative from Maine, serving three terms from 1961 to 1967.

== Early life ==
Born in Boothbay Harbor, Maine, Tupper was educated at local schools, and graduated from Boothbay Harbor High School in 1939. He then attended Hebron Academy for a year of college prep, and was admitted into Middlebury College in Middlebury, Vermont.

== World War II ==
In 1942 at age 21, Tupper joined the United States Border Patrol, completed training in El Paso, Texas, and carried out assignments on both the Mexican and Canadian borders.

Tupper joined the United States Navy in mid-World War II; he served from September 1944 to March 1946, and was discharged as a Petty Officer Third Class.

== Career ==
He returned to the Border Patrol until resigning in 1948, when he returned to Maine and began to study law with his father while also taking law school courses through LaSalle Extension University of Chicago, Illinois.

He graduated from LaSalle University in 1948, was admitted to the bar in 1949, and began to practice in Boothbay Harbor. Tupper also began to serve in local government; he was elected to the Boothbay Harbor board of selectmen in 1948, and was selected to serve as chairman in 1949. As a selectman, he took a lead role in creating the town's police department, and his other initiatives included adopting the secret ballot for election of town officials, competitive bidding for town equipment and services, and the town manager form of government.

=== Early political offices ===
A Republican, Tupper served as member of the Maine House of Representatives from 1953 to 1954, as assistant state attorney general from 1959 to 1960, and as commissioner of the state Department of Sea and Shore Fisheries from 1953 to 1957.

== Congressman ==
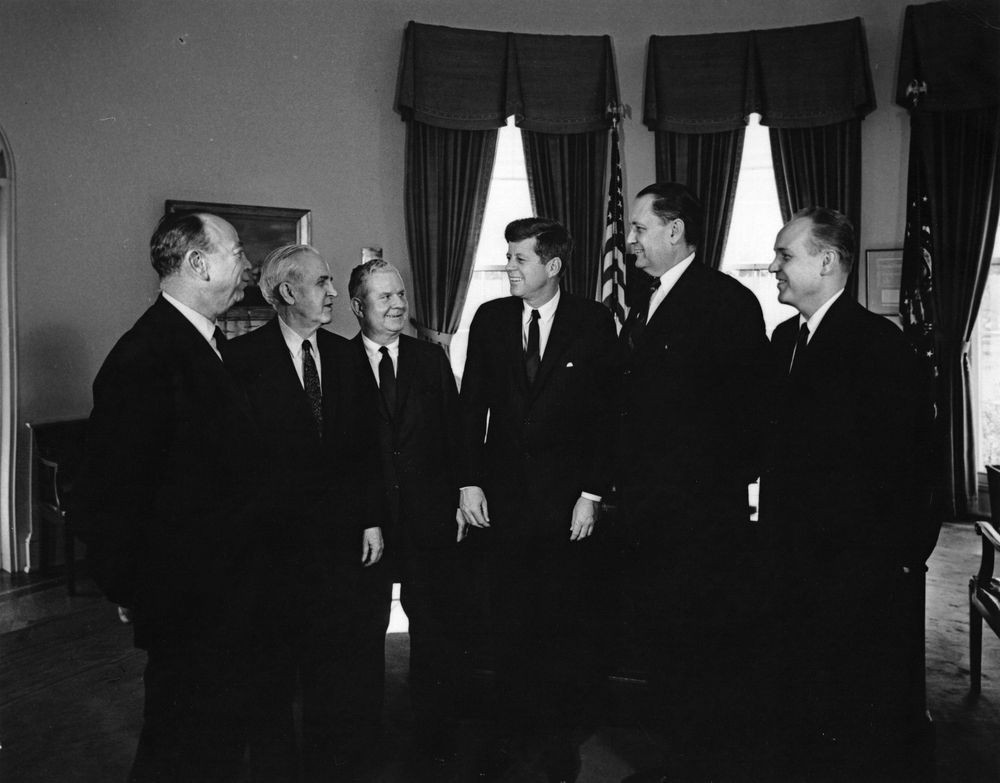
President John F. Kennedy meets with members of Congress. Left to right: Representative Phil M. Landrum (Georgia); Representative James William Trimble (Arkansas); Representative Harris B. McDowell, Jr. (Delaware); President Kennedy; Representative Carl Elliott (Alabama); Representative Stanley R. Tupper (Maine). Oval Office, White House, Washington, D.C.

Tupper was elected as a Republican to the Eighty-seventh and the two succeeding Congresses (January 3, 1961 – January 3, 1967).

Tupper voted in favor of the Civil Rights Act of 1964 and the Voting Rights Act of 1965, and along with fellow Republican congressman John Lindsay co-sponsored Medicare, and also supported Medicaid. Tupper was one of 20 House Republicans to support the repeal of the right-to-work law in the Taft-Hartley Act. In 1964, Tupper served as manager for Nelson Rockefeller's 1964 presidential campaign in New England and refused to support Arizona conservative senator Barry Goldwater for the 1964 United States presidential election.

In 1966, along with three Republican Senators and four other Republican Representatives, Tupper signed a telegram sent to Georgia Governor Carl E. Sanders regarding the Georgia legislature's refusal to seat the recently elected Julian Bond in the Georgia House of Representatives. This refusal, said the telegram, was "a dangerous attack on representative government. None of us agree with Mr. Bond's views on the Vietnam War; in fact we strongly repudiate these views. But unless otherwise determined by a court of law, which the Georgia Legislature is not, he is entitled to express them."

== Later career ==
Tupper was not a candidate for reelection to the Ninetieth Congress in 1966. He was appointed United States Commissioner General to the Canadian World Exhibition of 1967. He resumed the practice of law in 1968. In 1969, Tupper was appointed president of the States’ Urban Action Center, a non-profit entity created by Nelson Rockefeller to aid state governors with identifying problems unique to cities and crafting solutions.

From 1969 to 1972, Tupper practiced law in Washington, D.C., as a partner in the firm now known as Rogers & Wells. In 1972, he returned to Boothbay Harbor and continued to practice law. In 1975, he declined a position as an Assistant Secretary of Defense in the administration of Gerald Ford. From 1975 to 1976, Tupper was United States Commissioner on the North East Atlantic Fisheries Commission.

Although a Republican, Tupper supported Democratic presidential candidate Bill Clinton in the 1992 presidential election.

== Career as author ==
Tupper was the co-author of One Continent-Two Voices, a book on Canadian-American relations. He also authored a set of memoirs based on the notable individuals he met during his life, which was titled Recollections.

In addition to his writing, Tupper lectured at several colleges and universities, and served on a number of government and civic boards and commissions, including the Maine Maritime Academy Board of Trustees, St. Andrews Hospital of Boothbay, Bigelow Laboratory for Ocean Sciences, and the U.S. Civil Rights Advisory Commission.

Tupper was a recipient of the honorary degree of LL.D. from Ricker College.

== Death and burial ==
Tupper died in Boothbay Harbor on January 6, 2006.

== Family ==
Tupper's first wife was Esther McKown; they were the parents of a son, Stanley R. Tupper Jr.

After his 1968 divorce from his first wife, Tupper was married to Jill Kaplan Tupper, an attorney who practiced law in partnership with him. Their children included daughter Lara Abigail.

== Sources ==
=== Internet ===
- "Obituary, Stanley R. Tupper". GenLookUps.com. January 12, 2006.

=== Books ===
- United States House of Representatives (1964). Official Congressional Directory. Washington, DC: US Government Printing Office.

=== Newspapers ===
- "Maine Briefs: Stanley R. Tupper, a former Maine congressman, and his wife are divorced after 27 years of marriage". Biddeford-Saco Journal. Biddeford, Maine. Associated Press. July 16, 1968.

U.S. House of Representatives
Preceded by Frank M. Coffin	Member of the U.S. House of Representatives from Maine's 2nd congressional district 1961–1963	Succeeded by Clifford G. McIntire
Preceded by Peter A. Garland	Member of the U.S. House of Representatives from Maine's 1st congressional district 1963–1967	Succeeded by Peter Kyros
