= John F. Ward =

American politician

John F. Ward (June 12, 1904 - March 16, 1973) was an American politician from Maine. A Republican from Millinocket, Maine, Ward served three terms in the Maine House of Representatives (1942–1948) and three terms in the Maine Senate (1948–1954). He served two terms in the leadership of the Maine House, including as Majority Leader (1944–1946) and as Speaker (1946–1948). During Ward's final term in the Maine Senate, he served as president during the 1954 special session.
