= John G. Richardson =

American politician (1957–2020)

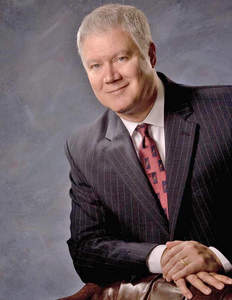

Commissioner of the Department of Economic and Community Development
- In office January 2007 – November 2009
- Preceded by: Jack Cashman
- Succeeded by: Thaxter Trafton

97th Speaker of the Maine House of Representatives
- In office December 2004 – December 2006
- Preceded by: Patrick Colwell
- Succeeded by: Glenn Cummings

Maine House Majority Leader
- In office December 2002 – December 2004
- Preceded by: Patrick Colwell
- Succeeded by: Glenn Cummings

Member of the Maine House of Representatives from the 49th & 63rd district
- In office December 1998 – December 2006
- Preceded by: Reginald G. Pinkham
- Succeeded by: Charles R. Priest

Personal details
- Born: June 29, 1957 Washington, D.C., US
- Died: June 16, 2020 (aged 62) Brunswick, Maine, US
- Party: Democratic
- Spouse: Dr. Stephanie Grohs
- Children: 3
- Education: Creighton University School of Law, University of Maryland
- Profession: Lawyer
- Website: John Richardson for Maine

John G. Richardson (June 29, 1957 – June 16, 2020) was an American politician and consultant from Maine. A Democrat, he served as Maine's Commissioner of Economic and Community Development and the Speaker of the Maine House of Representatives. Richardson unsuccessfully sought the Democratic nomination for Governor of Maine in 2010. In February 2018, the Portland Press Herald reported that Richardson was involved in a potential conflict of interest case regarding the University of Maine and a $100 million redevelopment plan for the nearby Old Town mill. On February 9, 2018, the Portland Press Herald reported that there weren't any conflict of interest issues involving UMaine or Richardson.

== Background ==
Richardson was born in Washington, D.C. He received his bachelor's degree from University of Maryland in 1983 and his Juris Doctor degree from Creighton University School of Law in 1987. He practiced law in Brunswick, Maine.

== Political career ==
In 2002, Richardson was elected House Majority Leader in the 121st Legislature, where he was the political spokesperson for the House Democratic caucus.

Richardson was elected the 97th Speaker of the House of Representatives in 2005. As Speaker, he successfully led efforts eliminate a $1 billion budget deficit and to balance the budget, brokered legislation to cut taxes, and reformed the Business Equipment Tax Reimbursement law.

Richardson also sponsored the legislation which created the Mid Coast Regional Redevelopment Authority(MRRA) and served on its planning and implementing committees.

In January 2007, he was appointed Commissioner of the Maine Department of Economic and Community Development, a position that he held until November 2009. He also served as a board member on the Finance Authority of Maine (FAME).

Committee assignments

- Business and Economic Development (Chair)
- Banking and Insurance
- Rules and Business of the House (Ex Officio)

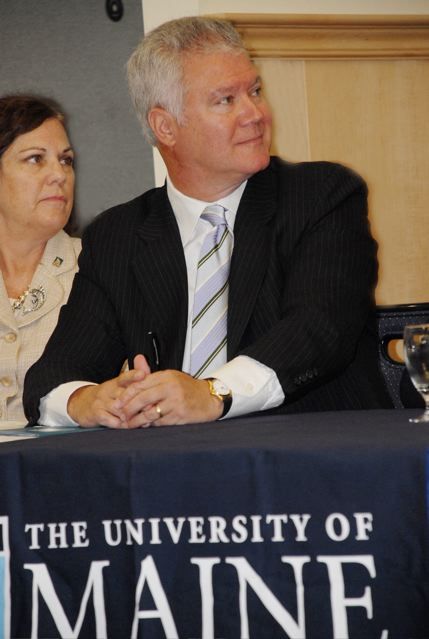
Richardson at the University of Maine.

== 2010 gubernatorial bid and public appearances ==
On April 26, 2010, just six weeks prior to the Democratic primary, Richardson ended his run for governor. He was denied failed public financing after the state ethics commission discovered hundreds of falsified or otherwise improperly collected $5 qualifying contributions which were required of candidates to obtain public funding.

Richardson was a political commentator on WCSH, Southern Maine' NBC affiliate. He also gave the political rebuttal to Governor Paul LePage's weekly radio address on WCME.

== Death ==
Richardson died on June 16, 2020, at the age of 62, from an apparent heart attack.

== Election history ==
Year	Office	Election	Subject	Party	Votes	%	Opponent	Party	Votes	%
1998	State Representative District 49	General	John Richardson	Democratic	1,351	51.1	Reginald G. Pinkham	Republican	1,294	48.9
2000	State Representative District 49	General	John Richardson	Democratic	2,399	65.6	William J. Donovan	Republican	1,259	34.4
2002	State Representative District 49	General	John Richardson	Democratic	1,884	63.3	Ronald G. Dumont	Republican	1,094	36.7
2004	State Representative District 63	General	John Richardson	Democratic	2,920	61.5	Amy L. Mckenna	Republican	1,827	38.5
