= George E. Weeks =

American politician (1837–1893)

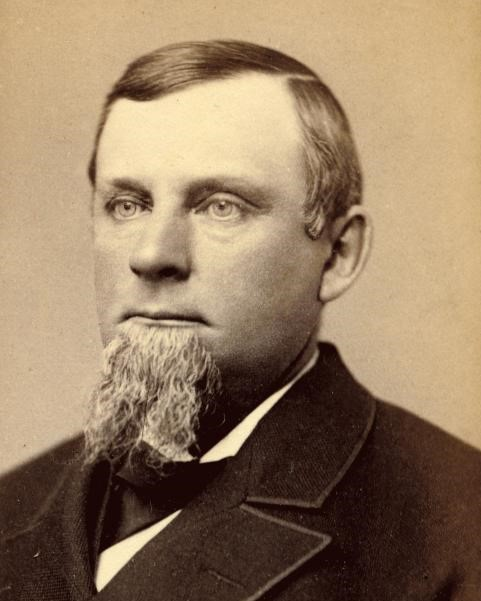
- Official portrait, 1880

Member of the Maine Senate from the 7th district
- In office January 3, 1883 – January 5, 1887 Serving with Francis Heath
- Preceded by: Joseph S. Berry
- Succeeded by: Herbert M. Heath
- Constituency: Kennebec County

Mayor of Augusta, Maine
- In office 1885–1886
- Preceded by: Seth C. Whitehouse
- Succeeded by: George E. Macomber

46th Speaker of the Maine House of Representatives
- In office January 12, 1880 – January 5, 1881
- Preceded by: Melvin P. Frank
- Succeeded by: L. H. Hutchinson

Member of the Maine House of Representatives from Augusta
- In office January 2, 1878 – January 5, 1881 Serving with Peleg O. Vickery (1878–1880); J. Prescott Wyman (1880–1881)
- Preceded by: J. Manchester Haynes
- Succeeded by: Anson Morrill
- In office January 1, 1873 – January 7, 1874 Serving with Samuel Titcomb
- Preceded by: J. Prescott Wyman
- Succeeded by: Joseph H. Williams

Personal details
- Born: December 16, 1837 Jefferson, Maine, U.S.
- Died: February 22, 1893 (aged 55)
- Party: Republican
- Education: Maine State Seminary; Waterville College
- Occupation: Businessman; lawyer; politician

George E. Weeks (December 16, 1837 – February 22, 1893) was an American politician, who served in the Maine House of Representatives and Maine Senate and as Mayor of Augusta. He was elected Speaker of the Maine House of Representatives during the legislature's 1880 session.
