= J. Manchester Haynes =

American politician from Maine

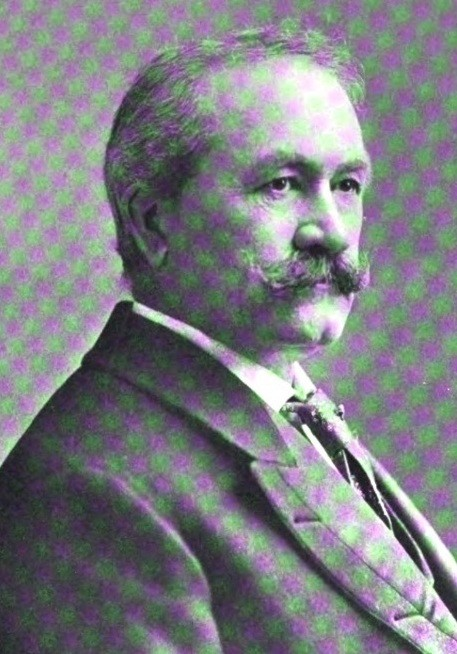
- Haynes in 1903

48th Speaker of the Maine House of Representatives
- In office January 3, 1883 – January 7, 1885
- Preceded by: L. H. Hutchinson
- Succeeded by: Charles Hamlin

Member of the Maine House of Representatives from Augusta
- In office January 3, 1883 – January 7, 1885 Serving with Herbert M. Heath
- Preceded by: Anson Morrill
- Succeeded by: Ira H. Randall
- In office 1876–1878 Serving with George S. Ballard
- Preceded by: Gardiner C. Vose
- Succeeded by: George E. Weeks

56th President of the Maine Senate
- In office 1879–1880
- Preceded by: Warren H. Vinton
- Succeeded by: Joseph A. Locke

Member of the Maine Senate from the 7th district
- In office 1878–1880 Serving with Greenlief T. Stevens (1878–1879); Moses S. Mayhew (1879–1880)
- Preceded by: John Woodberry
- Succeeded by: Joseph S. Berry
- Constituency: Kennebec County

Personal details
- Born: Josiah Manchester Haynes; May 12, 1839 Waterville, Maine, U.S.
- Died: September 3, 1906 (aged 67)
- Party: Republican
- Education: Waterville College
- Occupation: Businessperson; politician

Josiah Manchester Haynes (May 12, 1839 – September 3, 1906) was an American businessperson, lawyer, and politician from Augusta, Maine. Haynes was elected to the Maine Legislature five times and served as Senate President in 1879 and Speaker of the House in 1882—83. In business, he was heavily invested in shipbuilding, railroads, timber, and the commercial ice production.

== Politics ==
Haynes, a Republican, served two single year terms in the Maine House of Representatives (1876—77) and two in the Maine Senate (1878—79). As Senate President during a constitutional crisis following the 1878 gubernatorial election, Haynes served as acting governor. In 1882, shortly after legislative terms were changed from one to two years, he was elected again to the House where he was chosen as Speaker.

He was heavily involved in national politics as well. From 1884-92, he served on the Republican National Committee and as delegate to the 1884 Republican National Convention which chose fellow Mainer Sen. James G. Blaine as its presidential nominee.

== Business ==
Haynes was the promoter and president of a number of companies, including the Augusta, Hallowell and Gardiner Electric Railway and Augusta's Opera House. He also served as a director of the Edwards Manufacturing Company, the Knickerbocker Steam and Towage Company, and the Portland Street Railroad Company.

== Personal ==
Haynes was from Waterville, Maine and graduated from Waterville College. At the time of his death in 1906, he was a millionaire. He bequeathed $10,000 in his will to build the "J. Manchester Haynes Home for Nurses," which opened in 1908.
