= List of mayors of Augusta, Maine =

The following is a list of mayors of the city of Augusta, Maine, United States.

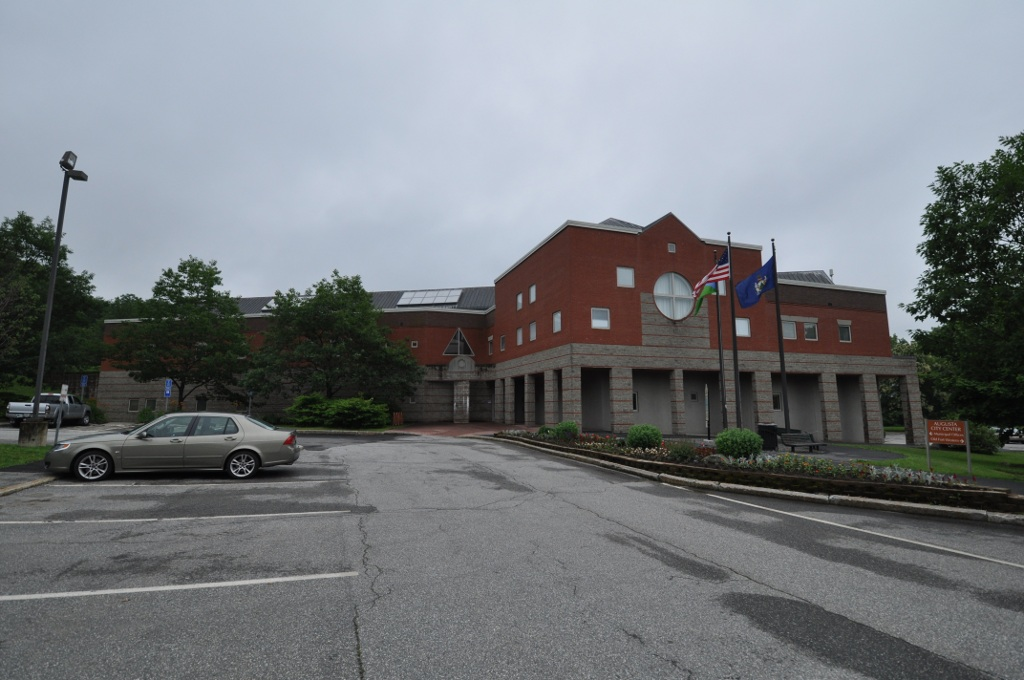
View of current City Hall building in Augusta, Maine, 2013

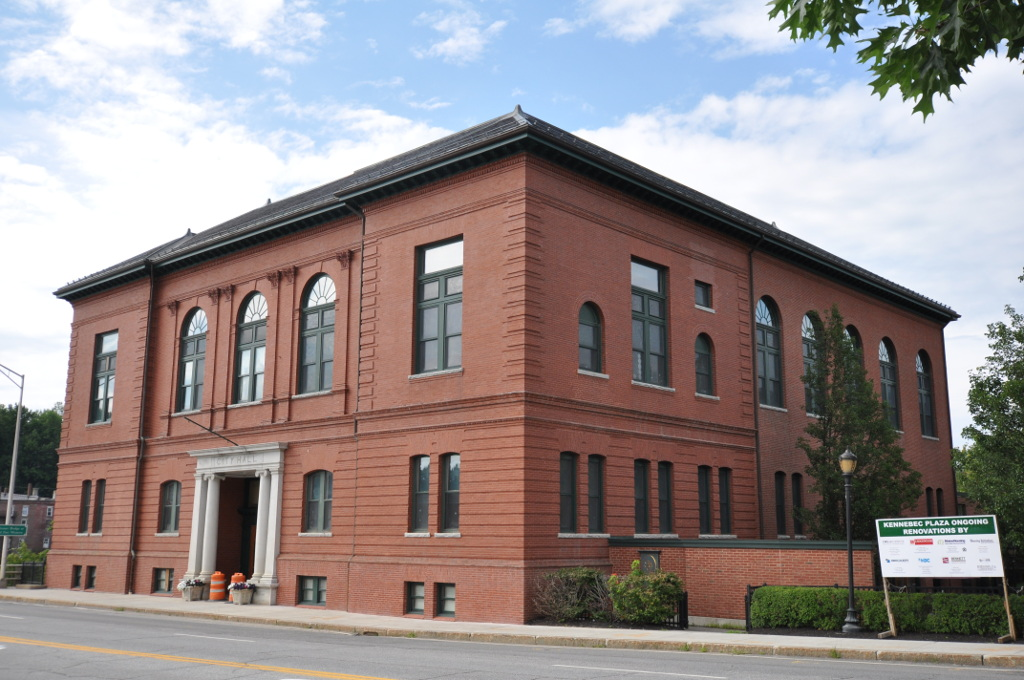
View of former City Hall building in Augusta, Maine; seat of government 1896-1987

- Alfred Reddington, 1850-1851
- John A. Pettengell, 1852-1853
- Samuel Cony, 1854
- Joseph W. Patterson, 1855, 1865, 1867
- Albert M. Dole, 1856
- James W. North, 1857–1860, 1873-1874
- Sylvanus Caldwell, 1861–1862, 1864, 1866
- William T. Johnson, 1863
- Daniel Williams, 1868
- Samuel Titcomb, 1869-1870
- Joseph J. Eveleth, 1871-1872
- Daniel Cony, 1875
- Charles E. Nash, 1876-1879
- Peleg O. Vickery, 1880-1882
- Alden W. Philbrook, 1883
- Seth C. Whitehouse, 1884
- George E. Weeks, 1885
- George E. Macomber, 1886-1888
- Samuel W. Lane, 1889–1890, 1899-1900
- John W. Chase, 1891-1892
- Moses R. Leighton, 1893
- Charles A. Milliken, 1894-1895
- Winfield S. Choate, 1896-1897
- J. Manchester Haynes, 1898
- Lendall Titcomb, 1901-1902
- Gustavus A. Robertson, 1903-1904
- Charles S. Hichborn, 1905
- Frederick W. Plaisted, 1906–1908, 1910
- Treby Johnson, 1909
- Reuel J. Noyes, 1911-1912
- Elmer E. Newbert, 1913-1914
- Blaine S. Viles, 1915-1916
- Willis E. Swift, 1917-1918
- Burleigh Martin, 1919-1920
- Sanford L. Fogg, 1921-1922
- Ernest L. McLean, 1923-1928
- Robert A. Cony, 1929-1934
- Frederick G. Payne, 1935-1941
- Sanford L. Fogg Jr., 1942-1943, 1945–1946
- Ralph W. Farris, January 14–18, 1943
- Levi T. Williams, 1943-1944
- Charles P. Nelson, 1947-1948
- Richard B. Sanborn, 1949–1952
- Brooks Brown Jr., 1953-1956
- H. Lloyd Carey, 1957–1958
- Sylvio Gilbert, 1959–1968
- Anthony Violette, 1969–1970
- Stanley Sproul, 1971–1974
- John C. Bridge, ca.1998
- William E. Dowling, 1998–2006
- Roger Katz, 2006–2010
- William R. Stokes, 2011-2014
- David Rollins, 2014-ca.2020
- Mark S. O'Brien, ca.2024–present

== See also ==
- Former Augusta City Hall, in use 1896–1987
- Augusta history
