= Charles Halsted =

American politician

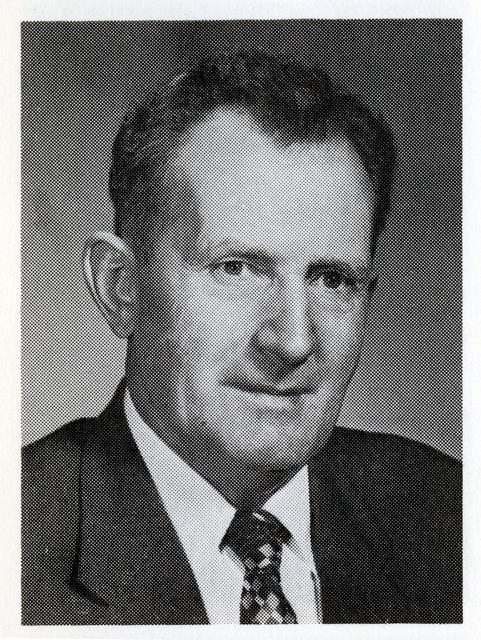

Member of the Minnesota House of Representatives from the 53rd district
- In office 1953–1967

Member of the Minnesota House of Representatives from the 53rd district
- In office 1937–1947

Personal details
- Born: September 23, 1894 Ellendale, North Dakota
- Died: February 19, 1968 (aged 73) Crow Wing County, Minnesota
- Party: DFL
- Occupation: Grocer

Charles Lafayette "Chas" Halsted (September 23, 1894 – February 19, 1968) was a Minnesota politician. Halsted was a member of the Minnesota House of Representatives for more than 20 years. He was a candidate for governor of Minnesota in 1948.

Charles Halsted was born in Ellendale, North Dakota. He attended the North Dakota State Normal and Industrial School at Ellendale, graduating in 1914. He moved to Brainerd, Minnesota in 1929 and opened Halsted's Grocery Store. Halsted served as town clerk in Brainerd in addition to his work as a grocer. He was first elected to the legislature in 1937, representing Brainerd. He served in the legislature until 1947.

In 1948, he unsuccessfully challenged incumbent Republican governor Luther Youngdahl as the Democratic-Farmer-Labor Party candidate in Minnesota's 1948 gubernatorial election. Halsted was supported by the right-wing faction of the DFL, then led by Hubert Humphrey. Halsted campaigned on a platform that the two biggest issues of the day were healthcare access and housing. Halsted noted the scarcity in access to medical care in rural regions, with some medical buildings being nothing more than a single room. In the far north of the state, distances to the nearest hospital became as great as 100 miles. Halsted stated that the funds to build new hospitals, however no action had been taken to use the funds.

In 1953, Halsted returned to the Minnesota House of Representatives, where he served until 1967.

== Personal life ==
In 1926, Halsted was married to Myrtle Gamble (1906–1968). The couple had with seven children. He died during 1968 in Crow Wing County, Minnesota and was buried at the Evergreen Cemetery in Brainerd, Minnesota.

Party political offices
Preceded by Harold H. Barker	Endorsed Gubernatorial Candidate, Minnesota DFL State Convention; 1948	Succeeded by Harry H. Peterson
Preceded by Harold H. Barker	DFL nominee for Governor of Minnesota; 1948	Succeeded by Harry H. Peterson
