= Vickery Building =

- U.S. National Register of Historic Places
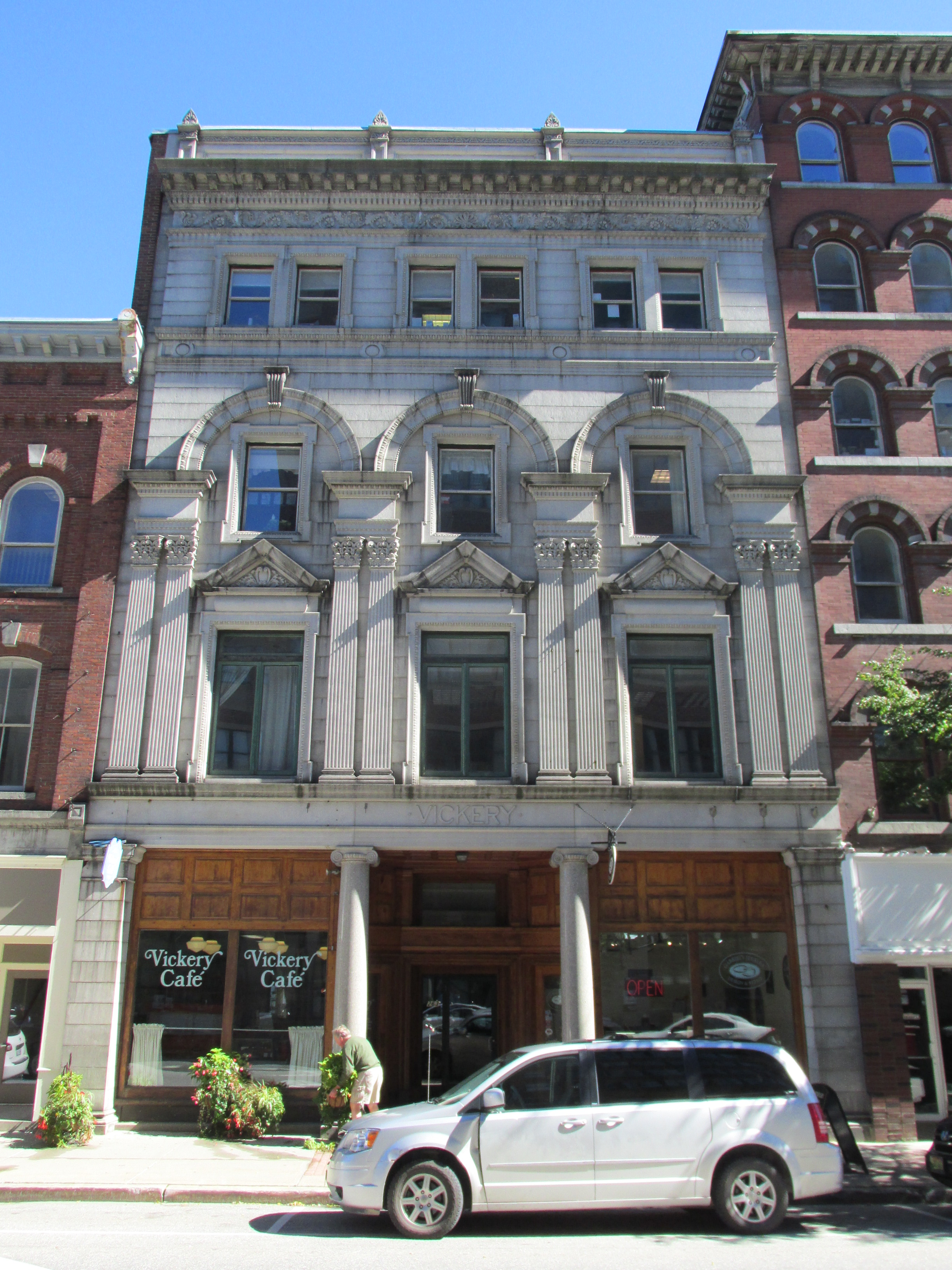

- Location within Maine Location within the United States
- Location: 261 Water St., Augusta, Maine
- Coordinates: 44°18′46″N 69°46′28″W
- Area: 0.3 acres (0.12 ha)
- Built: 1895
- Architect: Spofford, John C.
- Architectural style: Late 19th And 20th Century Revivals
- NRHP reference No.: 84001380
- Added to NRHP: March 22, 1984

The Vickery Building is a historic commercial building at 261 Water Street in downtown Augusta, Maine. Built 1895 to a design by John C. Spofford, it is one of the downtown's few granite commercial buildings, built for Peleg O. Vickery, a leading publisher and three-term mayor of the city. It was listed on the National Register of Historic Places in 1984.

== Description and history ==
The Vickery Building stands on the east side of Water Street in downtown Augusta, just north of the Doughty Block, and opposite the Key Plaza. It is a four-story masonry structure, with a three-bay granite facade decorated in a commercial Italianate style. The ground floor has a central recessed entrance flanked by Ionic columns, with display windows on either side, framed by wooden elements with panels above. Second-floor window bays are articulated by paired fluted pilasters and topped by pedimented gables. Third-floor windows are set in rectangular openings surrounded by keystoned arches set on capitals that top the paired pilasters of the second level. The fourth floor bays each have two sash windows in simple openings, and the building has an elaborate cornice topped by a decorative parapet.

The Vickery Building was designed by John C. Spofford, an architect from Boston who had several notable commissions in Maine, including one of the Maine State Capitol wings. It was built for Peleg O. Vickery, who was one of the city's leading publishers, and served three terms as its mayor. This building was built by Vickery as a business investment, and continues to see commercial use.

== See also ==
- National Register of Historic Places in Kennebec County, Maine
