= William S. Silsby =

American politician and lawyer

Speaker of the Maine House of Representatives
- In office 1951–1952
- Preceded by: Nathaniel M. Haskell
- Succeeded by: Roswell P. Bates

Member of the Maine House of Representatives
- In office 1949–1955

Personal details
- Born: May 15, 1902 Aurora, Maine, U.S.
- Died: September 19, 1987 (aged 85) Aurora, Maine, U.S.
- Party: Republican
- Education: Suffolk University Law School
- Profession: lawyer

William Sands Silsby Sr. (May 15, 1902 – September 19, 1987) was an American politician and lawyer from Maine. A Republican from Aurora, Maine, Silsby served in the Maine House of Representatives and was its Speaker from 1951 to 1952. His father (Herbert Trafton Silsby), grandfather (Charles Silsby) and great grandfather (Samuel Silsby) all also served in the House, representing Aurora.
