= George Herbert Babb =

American politician

Member of the Maine Senate from the Sebago district
- In office 1919–1922

Personal details
- Born: January 8, 1864
- Died: December 4, 1950 (aged 86)

George Herbert Babb (January 8, 1864 – December 4, 1950), of Sebago, Maine, was a member of the Maine Legislature. He served in the Maine House of Representatives in the 1917–1918 term. He served in the Maine Senate in the 1919–1920 and 1921–1922 terms.
