= 1946 Minnesota gubernatorial election =

- November 5, 1946
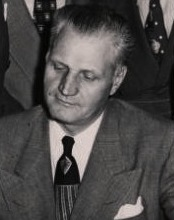

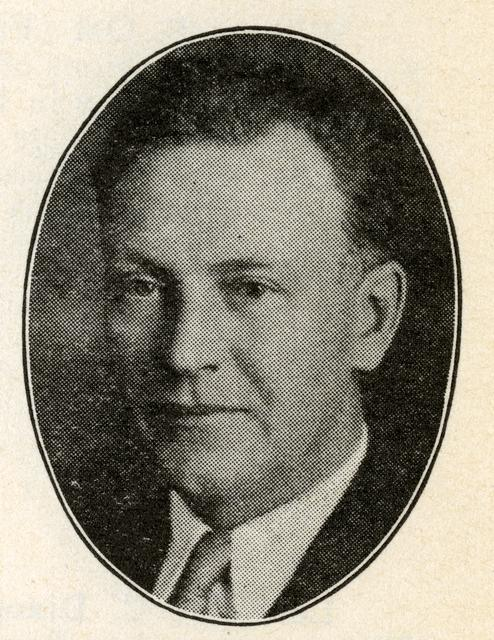
Nominee	Luther Youngdahl	Harold H. Barker
Party	Republican	Democratic (DFL)
Popular vote	519,067	349,565
Percentage	58.96%	39.71%
- County results Youngdahl: 40–50% 50–60% 60–70% 70–80% Barker: 40–50% 50–60% 60–70%
Governor before election
Edward John Thye
Republican
Elected Governor
Luther Youngdahl
Republican

The 1946 Minnesota gubernatorial election took place on November 5, 1946. Incumbent governor Edward John Thye did not seek reelection, and instead ran for the United States Senate. Republican candidate Luther Youngdahl defeated Minnesota Democratic–Farmer–Labor Party challenger Harold H. Barker.

== Republican primary ==
Luther Youngdahl was nominated, with his primary opposition being former Farmer-Laborite governor Hjalmar Petersen.

=== Candidates ===
==== Nominated ====
- Luther Youngdahl, associate justice of the Minnesota Supreme Court

=== Eliminated in primary ===
- Adrian Edmund "Ed" Hickenlooper, electrician and nephew of Bourke Hickenlooper
- Hjalmar Petersen, former governor

=== Results ===
Republican Party of Minnesota primary results
Party	Candidate	Votes	%
Republican	Luther Youngdahl	261,307	64.61%
Republican	Hjalmar Petersen	133,852	33.10%
Republican	Ed Hickenlooper	9,254	2.29%
Total votes		404,413	100%

== Democratic-Farmer-Labor primary ==
=== Candidates ===
==== Nominated ====
- Harold H. Barker, former speaker of the Minnesota House of Representatives

=== Eliminated in primary ===
- Edgar Bernard, farmer, Republican primary candidate in 1934, and Farmer-Labor primary candidate in 1936, 1940 and 1942
- Thomas P. Duffy, electrician
- Victor E. Johnson, farmer
- John J. McDonough, mayor of St. Paul and former member of the Minnesota House of Representatives
- Francis L. Murphy, painter and 1944 nominee for lieutenant governor

=== Results ===
Democratic-Farmer-Labor Party of Minnesota primary results
Party	Candidate	Votes	%
Democratic (DFL)	Harold H. Barker	52,780	44.67%
Democratic (DFL)	Francis L. Murphy	21,589	18.27%
Democratic (DFL)	Victor E. Johnson	15,357	13.00%
Democratic (DFL)	John J. McDonough	14,377	12.17%
Democratic (DFL)	Thomas P. Duffy	7,375	6.24%
Democratic (DFL)	Edgard Bernard	6,673	5.65%
Total votes		118,151	100%

== Candidates ==
- Harold H. Barker, former speaker of the Minnesota House of Representatives (DFL)
- Rudolph Gustafson, plumber (Industrial Government)
- Luther Youngdahl, associate justice of the Minnesota Supreme Court (Republican)

== Campaigns ==
Early in his campaign, Youngdahl received an endorsement from former Governor Harold Stassen.

Youngdahl led an ambitious campaign. One of his major plans was an expansion to welfare, to meet the incredible rise in post-war demand for basic services. His focus was "...to prevent distress among dependent children, the blind, and the aged.” He also campaigned on funding for education, citing underpaid teachers and the need for new school buildings. His most ambitious plan was the "5-Point Housing Plan". It was as follows:

1. Establishment of a state housing commission with full time executive staff working with an advisory citizens' volunteer group.
2. Deferment of all but the most essential public construction until housing shortage is over.
3. Passage of enabling legislation to permit the state and municipalities to take advantage of present and future federal housing acts.
4. Provision for state rent control if federal control should be removed while need for such regulation still exists.
5. Enactment of neighborhood redevelopment laws permitting public acquisition of blighted areas which could thus be cleared of obsolete structures and the lots resold to citizens for private home construction.

Barker criticized Youngdahl's housing plans, stating that since Republicans retook the governorship in 1939 there had been plans to expand housing, and many committee and organizations had been founded, yet actual housing development was minimal. He further criticized that the committees in charge of overseeing housing construction had no veterans, union representatives, or farmers present, and that the funding for the plans were reliant on sales tax. Barker and Youngdahl generally agreed on focusing more resources of the state on education. Barker did not directly attack Youngdahl's plans, instead arguing that the Republicans were responsible for the underserving of rural schools, citing a 1945 decision by the Republican-led government diverting $25 million from funding from rural schools. Barker further criticized Republicans firing education officials around the state due to affiliation with the DFL, notably State Education Commissioner Dr. John G. Rockwell, and Winona State Teachers' College President Oscar Myking Mehus in 1944.

Barker campaigned on tax reform. He planned to raise taxes on corporations, notably those involved in mining in the Mesabi Range, in order to lessen the tax burden on the people. Barker also advocated for enacting regulation on the rapidly expanding businesses of suburbia, notably department stores and chain stores that were detrimental to local small businesses.

Youngdahl, a devout Lutheran, called for "spiritual progress", which he described as a moral and spiritual advance that allowed for the establishment of permanent peace and representative government.

== Results ==
1946 gubernatorial election, Minnesota
Party	Candidate	Votes	%	±%
Republican	Luther Youngdahl	519,067	58.96%	−2.63%
Democratic (DFL)	Harold H. Barker	349,565	39.71%	+1.93%
Industrial Government	Rudolph Gustafson	11,716	1.33%	+0.70%
Majority		169,502	19.25%	
Turnout		880,348		
Republican hold		Swing		

== See also ==
- List of Minnesota gubernatorial elections
