= Bennett Katz =

American politician

Member of the Maine Senate from the 19 district
- In office 1966–1980

Personal details
- Born: October 7, 1918 Springfield, Massachusetts
- Died: November 1, 2007 (aged 89) Topsham, Maine
- Party: Republican

Bennett D. Katz (October 7, 1918 - November 1, 2007) was an American Republican politician from Maine.

Katz was born on October 7, 1918, in Springfield, Massachusetts, and attended schools in Boston, Massachusetts, before graduating with a B.A. degree from Tufts University. He was a United States Army Air Forces pilot and major during World War II. After the end of the war, he was a pilot for American Overseas Airlines. He and his family settled in Augusta, Maine, in 1950.

Katz represented Augusta in the Maine Legislature from his election to the Maine House of Representatives in 1962 until his retirement from the Maine Senate in 1980. He spent a total of 4 years (two terms) in the House and 14 years (7 terms) in the Senate. His time in the Senate included two terms (1969-1970; 1979-1980) as Majority Leader. His son, Roger Katz, was first elected to the Maine Senate in 2010 after serving as Mayor of Augusta.

Katz was instrumental in the founding of the University of Maine at Augusta in 1965. The Bennett D. Katz Library, built in 1974, is named in his honor. He received an honorary Doctor of Laws degree from the University of Maine at Augusta before his death in Topsham, Maine, nursing home on November 1, 2007.
