= Carol Perkins =

American business owner and fashion model

Carol Perkins (born December 29, 1957) is an American business owner, fashion model and pet product designer who started her own company, Harry Barker, Inc., in 1997. The success of Harry Barker has garnered Perkins national media coverage from CNBC business shows and USA Today to Ladies' Home Journal and O magazines. Perkins had been a Ford Model in the 1980s who went on to star with Penn & Teller in their 1990–91 Broadway hit, "Penn & Teller's Refrigerator Tour". An ordeal with a brain tumor and Cushing's Disease forced her to change direction. Perkins recovered and moved south to start her own pet products company, Harry Barker, named for her Shetland Sheepdog. Perkins is still represented by the Eileen Ford Modeling Agency, but spends most of her time running her multi-million pet products company in Charleston, South Carolina.

== Biography ==
=== Early life and modeling career ===
Perkins was born and raised in Sarasota, Florida, where her father was a high school principal and her mother was a painter. She spent weeks on end at the winter home of the Ringling Bros. and Barnum & Bailey Circus, tumbling and playing with the children of Emmett Kelly and Flying Wallendas. Perkins moved to New York City when she was sixteen, having graduated from high school a year early.

A statuesque brunette with blue eyes, Perkins was signed immediately by Eileen Ford of the Ford Modeling Agency. She appeared on the cover of the Victoria's Secret catalog, as well as in the pages of Vogue, Harper's Bazaar, and dozens of fashion magazines. Perkins lived in Paris and London for several years, traveling the world on modeling assignments.

In 1990, she met performer Penn Jillette while he was preparing a Penn & Teller event for NBC-TV, and appeared in the special Don't Try This at Home. She then was recruited to star in a fire eating segment of their first Broadway production, "The Refrigerator Tour". The New York Times hailed it as an "incendiary performance," although it wasn't without risk for someone whose career was based on her good looks.

It wasn't the fire-eating that ended her modeling career, however, but a near-fatal bout with brain cancer and Cushing's Disease. In the mid 1990s, Perkins gained 70 pounds, developed a hump on her back and a round face. She went to scores of doctors over the course of nearly two years, to no avail.

"I was disfigured and unemployable," said Perkins who went from jet-setter to shut-in. She started walking dogs and sewing dog beds for friends. Visiting an acupuncturist in Chinatown, he told her she had Cushing's Disease, a rare syndrome caused by a tumor on the pituitary gland. She had brain surgery to remove the tumor, during which she had a dream about starting a company for animals. As she recovered from the surgery and regained a normal hormone equilibrium, an editor friend featured one of Perkins' hand-crafted dog beds in a woman's magazine and Perkins was overwhelmed with orders from around the nation. It was May, 1997, and Perkins knew what her next career move would be.

=== Harry Barker ===
Perkins sold everything she owned and left New York City, opening the Harry Barker retail shop in Savannah, Georgia, that sold bedding, treats and toys for dogs and cats. After she met and married David Rawle, she moved her business to Charleston, South Carolina and focused on selling products through wholesale distribution and over the internet at HarryBarker.com

From the start, Perkins used recycled products in the manufacture of her pet beds, toys, collars and leashes. Each bed is fluffed with a special material that is made from 30 recycled plastic bottles. Perkins' designs have been acclaimed by consumers and media alike: Harry Barker products are regularly featured in magazines such as In Style, Coastal Living, O, Real Simple, and Martha Stewart Living. Because they are made with recycled products, Harry Barker frequently wins industry acclaim from sustainability groups and manufacturers' groups such as TreeHugger.com and Pet Product News.

Harry Barker is a privately owned company and does not reveal sales figures, but revenues have doubled in the last five years. The company's products are sold through more than 3,000 retailers around the world. Website sales at HarryBarker.com have doubled every year since 2006. The company also garners attention for its policy in employing adult workers from the Hope Disabilities Center, a community partnership that benefits many in the Charleston area. Every year the New York International Gift Show names Harry Barker or one of its products as “Most Sustainable Products and Practices.”

The product line is regularly expanding, and company sales are expected to keep growing for years to come.

=== Personal life ===
Perkins dedicates many resources to benefit the Medical University of South Carolina, such as donating a portion of company proceeds to the Children's Hospital. She also raises money to fund the hospital's program for therapy dogs. Perkins has served on the board of the local no-kill animal shelter, Pet Helpers. She is still represented by Ford Models and will travel on assignment from time to time. Her husband, David Rawle, formerly owns a large marketing communications agency in Charleston, Rawle-Murdy Associates. They have two dogs: Harry Barker, of course (Perkins' beloved Shetland sheepdog) and Josephine, an elegant Briard.

=== Media appearances ===
Women's magazines and home magazines have long raved about Harry Barker and its products. In 2008 and 2009, the business media started catching up. Perkins appeared on multiple segments of CNBC's Big Idea with Donny Deutsch (who reprised what has become a sort of media sobriquet: "Model Gets New Leash on Life"). She also appeared in the business pages of USA Today and newspapers coast to coast through regular Associated Press wire stories on the status of the pet product industry.

Perkins has also appeared on Paula Deen's TV cooking show (the two became friends in Savannah years ago) as well as countless local TV and newspaper interviews around the country.
