= Carol Kontos =

American politician

Carol A. Kontos (born December 5, 1946) is an American politician and college professor from Maine. A Democrat from Windham, Maine, Kontos served in the Maine House of Representatives from 1990 to 1998. During her final term in the House, Kontos was elected Majority Leader by her fellow Democrats. Unable to seek re-election in 1998 to the House, Kontos was elected the Maine Senate. She was defeated for re-election in 2000 by Republican Karl Turner of Cumberland.

Kontos was born in 1946 in Sterling, Illinois. She earned a B.A. from the University of Iowa in 1969 and a M.A. from the University of Maine in 1981. She later worked as an associate professor of English at the University of Maine at Augusta. Kontos and her husband Gregory have two children.
