= George Hill (Maine politician) =

American politician

George E. Hill

Member of the Maine House of Representatives
- In office 1933–1940

Personal details
- Born: December 9, 1903
- Died: November 1980 (aged 76)
- Party: Republican

George E. Hill (December 9, 1903 - November 1980) was an American politician from Maine. Hill, a Republican from South Portland, served in the Maine House of Representatives from 1933 to 1940. From 1937 to 1938, Hill was Speaker of the Maine House of Representatives.
