= Harold H. Barker =

American politician

Harold Henry Barker
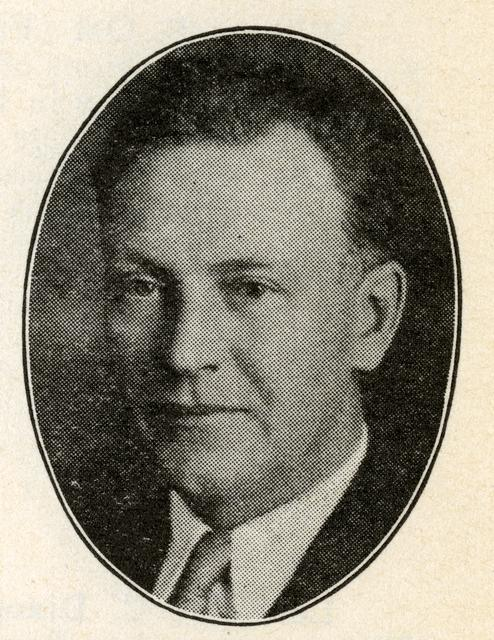

39th Speaker of the Minnesota House of Representatives
- In office January 1937 – January 1939
- Preceded by: George W. Johnson
- Succeeded by: Lawrence M. Hall

Minnesota State Representative
- In office January 1931 – January 1939

Personal details
- Born: 15 June 1889 Duluth, Minnesota, U.S.
- Died: 23 March 1949 (aged 59)
- Party: Nonpartisan Liberal Caucus; Farmer-Labor; DFL
- Spouse: Marion Grey

Harold Henry Barker (15 June 1889 – 23 March 1949) was an American politician. A member of the Minnesota DFL, he served Speaker of the Minnesota House of Representatives from 1937 to 1939. He was elected to the Minnesota House of Representatives, in 1930, where he caucused with the Liberal Caucus in the then-nonpartisan body. In 1937, he was elected to serve as speaker, a position he held for two years. His father, H. W. Barker, served in the Wisconsin State Senate.

Barker would become the leader of the newly formed DFL from its creation in 1944. He was officially named State Chairman in 1946. The newly formed party found itself in an ideological struggle between the left-wing and right-wing factions of the party, with Barker leading the left.

In 1946, Barker served as the second gubernatorial candidate after of the merger of the Minnesota Democratic and Farmer-Labor Parties into the Democratic-Farmer-Labor Party, losing to Luther Youngdahl. Barker criticized Youngdahl's housing plans, stating that since Republicans retook the governorship in 1939 there have been plans to expand housing, and a lot of committee and organizations have been founded, yet actual housing development was minimal. He further criticized that the committees in charge of overseeing housing construction had no veterans, union representatives, or farmers present, and that the funding for the plans were reliant on sales tax. Barker and Youngdahl generally agreed on focusing more resources of the state towards education. Barker did not directly attack Youngdahl's plans, instead arguing that the Republicans were responsible for the underserving of rural schools, citing a 1945 decision by the Republican-led government diverting $25 million from funding from rural schools. Barker further criticized Republicans firing education officials around the state due to affiliation with the DFL, notably State Education Commissioner Dr. John G. Rockwell, and Winona State Teachers' College President Oscar Myking Mehus in 1944.

Barker also campaigned on tax reform. He planned to raise taxes on corporations, notably those involved in mining in the Mesabi Range, in order to lessen the tax burden on the people. Barker also advocated for enacting regulation on the rapidly expanding businesses of suburbia, notably department stores and chain stores that were detrimental to local small businesses.

Following his electoral defeat and an internal rebellion against him in the YDFL, Barker would lose his position as party chairman in 1948. He was replaced by political opponent Orville Freeman.

== See also ==
- History of the Minnesota Democratic–Farmer–Labor Party

Political offices
Preceded by George W. Johnson	Speaker of the Minnesota House of Representatives; 1937–1939	Succeeded by Lawrence M. Hall
Party political offices
Preceded by Byron G. Allen	Endorsed Gubernatorial Candidate, Minnesota DFL State Convention; 1946	Succeeded by Charles Halsted
Preceded by Byron G. Allen	DFL nominee for Governor of Minnesota; 1946	Succeeded by Charles Halsted
Preceded by Elmer Kelm	Democratic-Farmer-Labor Party Chairman; 1946-1948	Succeeded by Orville Freeman
