= Former Augusta City Hall =

- Augusta City Hall, Former
- U.S. National Register of Historic Places
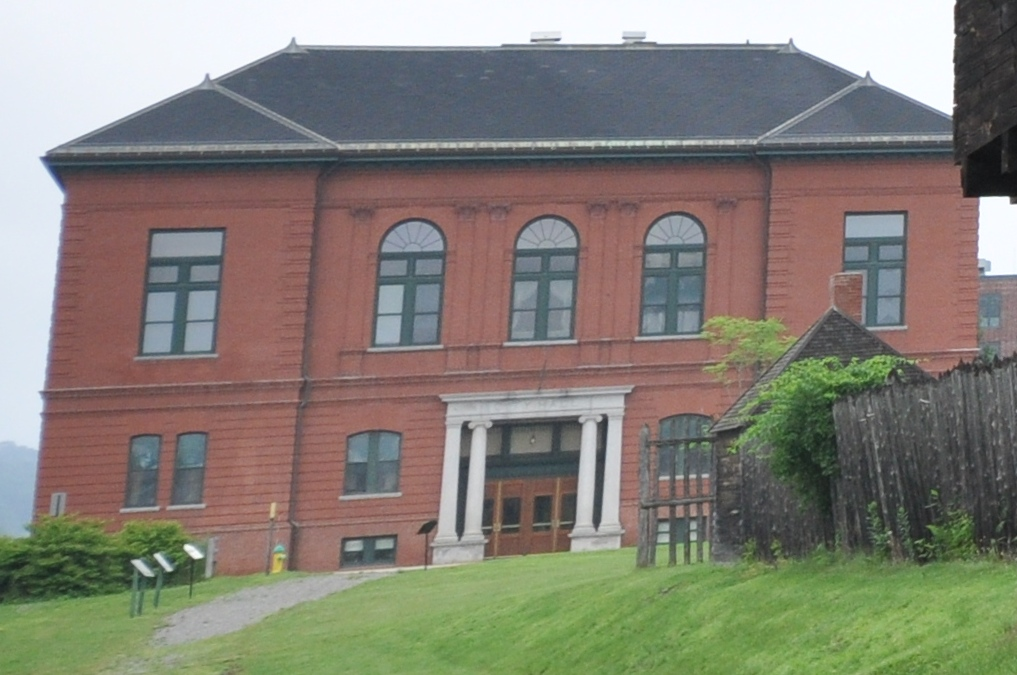

- Location within Maine Location within the United States
- Location: 1 Cony St., Augusta, Maine
- Coordinates: 44°19′1″N 69°46′18″W
- Area: less than one acre
- Built: 1896
- Architect: John Calvin Spofford
- Architectural style: Second Renaissance Revival
- NRHP reference No.: 97001134
- Added to NRHP: September 26, 1997

The Former Augusta City Hall is located at 1 Cony Street in Augusta, Maine. Built in 1895-96, it is a well-preserved local example of civic Renaissance Revival architecture, and served as Augusta's city hall until 1987. The building, now an assisted living facility called The Inn At City Hall, was listed on the National Register of Historic Places in 1997.

== Description and history ==
Augusta's former city hall is located on the north side of Cony Street, with the Kennebec River to the west and Fort Western, a National Historic Landmark, to the south. The current city hall is located just east of Fort Western. It is a two-story brick building, covered with a hip roof. The main facade, facing south toward Cony Street, is five bays wide, the outer bays projecting slightly. The center three bays have paired sash windows on the upper level, topped by transom windows and half-round fixed windows, and are flanked by pilasters. The outer bays have a similar arrangement of windows, except the top window is rectangular, and there are no pilasters. The corners of the projecting sections have brick quoins. The main entrance is framed by Ionic round stone columns and square pilasters, and is topped by a corniced entablature bearing the inscription "City Hall".

The city of Augusta was incorporate as a town (from Hallowell) in 1797, and was reincorporated as a city in 1849. Its early city offices were in the Opera House, and meetings took place in Winthrop Hall. This building was commissioned in 1895 and completed the following year; it was designed by Boston, Massachusetts architect John C. Spofford. In addition to municipal functions, its upper-level hall was also used for performances, notably by John Philip Sousa in 1897. The city vacated the building in 1987 for its new offices to the southeast. With its fate uncertain, the city voted to retain and rehabilitate the structure. It has been adapted for use as an assisted living facility.

== See also ==
- List of mayors of Augusta, Maine
- National Register of Historic Places listings in Kennebec County, Maine
