= Roswell P. Bates =

American politician and physician

Speaker of the Maine House of Representatives
- In office 1954–1955
- Preceded by: William S. Silsby
- Succeeded by: Willis A. Trafton Jr.

Member of the Maine House of Representatives
- In office 1949–1955

Personal details
- Born: February 27, 1911 Danvers, Massachusetts, U.S.
- Died: July 14, 1975 (aged 64) Bangor, Maine, U.S.
- Party: Republican
- Education: Bowdoin College, Philadelphia College of Osteopathic Medicine
- Profession: physician

Roswell Preston "Ross" Bates (February 27, 1911 – July 14, 1975) was an American politician and physician from Maine. A Republican from Orono, Maine, Bates served in the Maine House of Representatives and was its Speaker from 1954 to 1955. He attended Bowdoin College and the Philadelphia College of Osteopathic Medicine.
