= H. W. Barker =

American politician

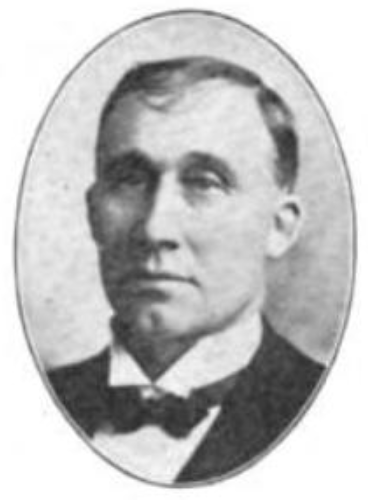

Member of the Wisconsin State Senate
- In office 1907–1909
- Constituency: District 31

Personal details
- Born: Henry W. Barker; March 18, 1860 Leon, Monroe County, Wisconsin
- Died: February 24, 1950 (aged 89) Sparta, Wisconsin
- Party: Republican
- Spouse: Frances Mary McMahan (m. 1884; died 1933)
- Children: Harold H. Barker
- Occupation: Druggist, politician

Henry W. Barker (March 18, 1860 – February 24, 1950) was a member of the Wisconsin State Senate.

== Biography ==
Barker was born in Leon, Monroe County, Wisconsin, and attended West Salem High School. After completing high school, he "went to Minnesota 'to visit' and stayed 22 years". He worked in the drug business for 15 years while living in Elbow Lake, Minnesota, and owned H. W. Barker Medical Company in Sparta, Wisconsin. On May 9, 1893 he was awarded a patent for a drug mixer which he claimed could also be used to pop corn or roast coffee.

== Career ==
Barker was a member of the Senate from 1907 to 1909. Previously, he had served three terms as Mayor of Elbow Lake. He was a Republican. In the Senate, he became chair of the health and sanitation committee, where he successfully pushed for passage of a "long sheet" law "requiring hotels to use sheets nine feet in length to cover the mattresses and comforters".

== Personal life ==
Barker married Frances Mary McMahan in 1884; she died in 1933. Barker died at the home of one of his two daughters, in Sparta, at the age of 89. Barker's son Harold H. Barker served in the Minnesota legislature.

H. W. Barker died at his daughter's home in Sparta on February 24, 1950.
