= Sebago, Maine =

Town in the United States

- Town
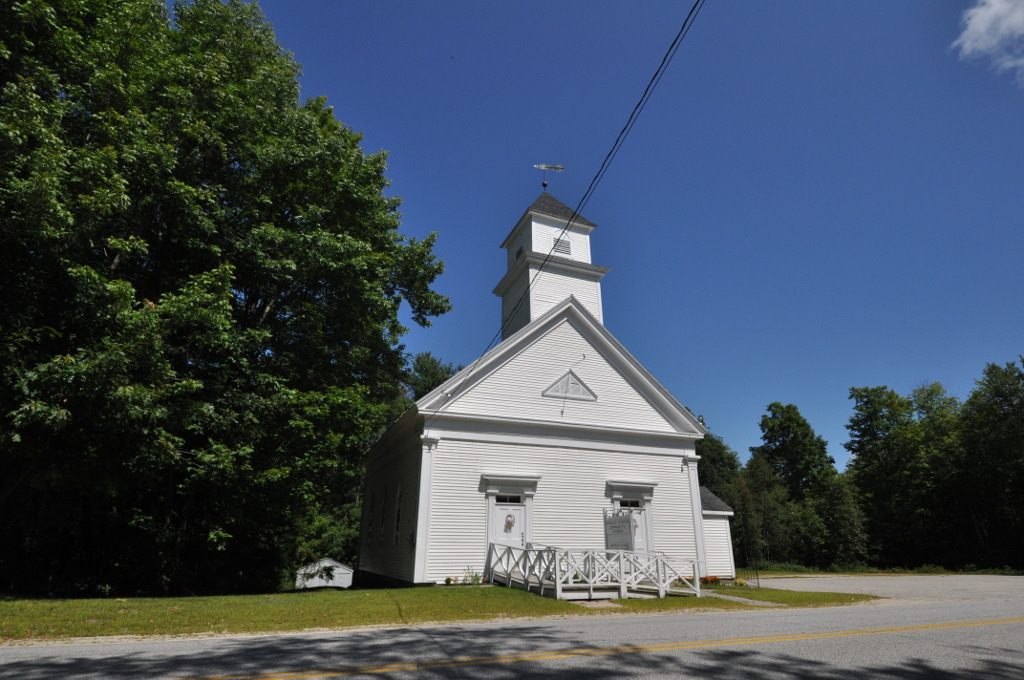
- Sebago Community Church

- Seal

- Location in Cumberland County and the state of Maine
- Coordinates: 43°53′34″N 70°40′39″W
- Country: United States
- State: Maine
- County: Cumberland
- Incorporated: 1826
- Villages: East Sebago; Hillside; Long Beach; North Sebago; Sebago Center; West Sebago

Area
  - Total: 48.93 sq mi (126.73 km^{2})
  - Land: 32.76 sq mi (84.85 km^{2})
  - Water: 16.17 sq mi (41.88 km^{2})
- Elevation: 430 ft (130 m)

Population (2020)
  - Total: 1,911
  - Density: 58/sq mi (22.5/km^{2})
- Time zone: UTC−5 (Eastern (EST))
  - Summer (DST): UTC−4 (EDT)
- ZIP Code: 04029
- Area code: 207
- FIPS code: 23-66775
- GNIS feature ID: 582717
- Website: www.townofsebago.org

Sebago is a town in Cumberland County, Maine, United States. Sebago is included in the Lewiston-Auburn, Maine metropolitan New England City and Town Area. The population was 1,911 at the 2020 census. It is part of the Portland-South Portland-Biddeford metropolitan area.

== History ==
Originally called Flintstown, it was granted in 1774 by the Massachusetts General Court to survivors of Captain John Flint's company of soldiers from Concord, Massachusetts. It replaced a grant of 1735 that awarded them Township No. 3 (now Walpole, New Hampshire), but which was ruled invalid when the border between Massachusetts and New Hampshire was redrawn to satisfy prior claims by the descendants of John Mason. On June 23, 1802, Flintstown was incorporated as Baldwin. Then on February 10, 1826, Sebago was set off from Baldwin and incorporated as a separate town. It took the name of Sebago Lake. Land was annexed from Denmark in 1830, and taken in 1834 to help form Naples.

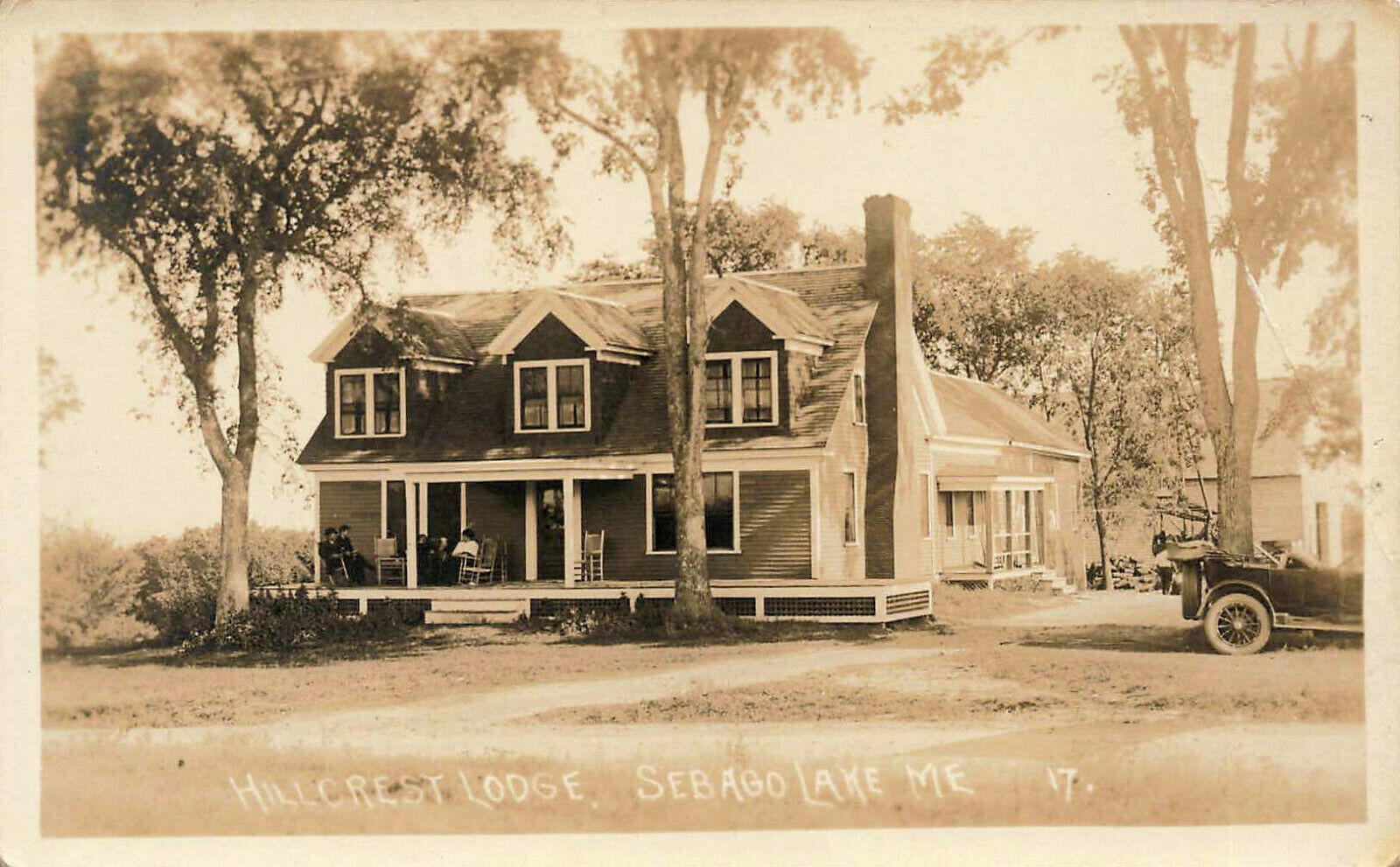
Hillcrest Lodge, Sebago Lake, ME – 1917

Lumberjacks and woodsmen were the first European inhabitants of the area, but they left as soon as the first growth of pine was cut. It 1790, Joseph Lakin from Groton, Massachusetts, built a cabin, then returned with his family and possessions. The surface of the town is very uneven and generally rocky, so it was hard work to clear a farm for cultivation. But the soil was good and yielded abundant crops. Mills were built at water power sites, and products included long and short lumber, shooks, and boots and shoes. In 1832, the Cumberland and Oxford Canal opened, increasing trade between Sebago Lake and Portland. In the early 1870s, the Portland and Ogdensburg Railroad carried tourists and freight to Sebago Lake Station in Standish, where steamboats took them to various landings around the lake. Inns, hotels and summer camps opened, and the town became a recreation area, which it remains today.

In 1906, the Order of Sir Galahad, an Episcopal youth organization, established Camp O-AT-KA in East Sebago.

== Geography ==
According to the United States Census Bureau, the town has a total area of 48.93 square miles (126.73 km^{2}), of which 32.76 square miles (84.85 km^{2}) is land and 16.17 square miles (41.88 km^{2}) is water. Situated beside Sebago Lake, Sebago is drained by the Northwest River and Mill Brook. Douglas Mountain has an elevation of 1,416 feet (432 m) above sea level, the highest point in both the town and southwestern Maine.

The town is crossed by state routes 11, 107 and 114. It is bordered by the towns of Bridgton to the north, Naples to the northeast, Baldwin and Standish to the south, and Denmark and Hiram to the west.

== Demographics ==
Historical population
Census	Pop.	Note	%±
1830	586		—
1840	707		20.6%
1850	850		20.2%
1860	958		12.7%
1870	803		−16.2%
1880	808		0.6%
1890	681		−15.7%
1900	576		−15.4%
1910	536		−6.9%
1920	541		0.9%
1930	470		−13.1%
1940	518		10.2%
1950	577		11.4%
1960	546		−5.4%
1970	708		29.7%
1980	974		37.6%
1990	1,259		29.3%
2000	1,433		13.8%
2010	1,719		20.0%
2020	1,911		11.2%
U.S. Decennial Census

=== 2010 census ===
As of the census of 2010, there were 1,719 people, 724 households, and 484 families living in the town. The population density was 52.5 inhabitants per square mile (20.3/km^{2}). There were 1,464 housing units at an average density of 44.7 per square mile (17.3/km^{2}). The racial makeup of the town was 97.1% White, 0.3% African American, 0.9% Native American, 0.2% Asian, and 1.5% from two or more races. Hispanic or Latino of any race were 0.3% of the population.

There were 724 households, of which 26.1% had children under the age of 18 living with them, 54.1% were married couples living together, 6.5% had a female householder with no husband present, 6.2% had a male householder with no wife present, and 33.1% were non-families. Of all households 25.8% were made up of individuals, and 7.6% had someone living alone who was 65 years of age or older. The average household size was 2.37 and the average family size was 2.80.

The median age in the town was 44.7 years. 20.2% of residents were under the age of 18; 6.7% were between the ages of 18 and 24; 23.5% were from 25 to 44; 33.7% were from 45 to 64; and 15.8% were 65 years of age or older. The gender makeup of the town was 51.2% male and 48.8% female.

=== 2000 census ===
As of the census of 2000, there were 1,433 people, 584 households, and 412 families living in the town. The population density was 43.7 inhabitants per square mile (16.9/km^{2}). There were 1,240 housing units at an average density of 37.8 per square mile (14.6/km^{2}). The racial makeup of the town was 98.33% White, 0.35% African American, 0.07% Native American, 0.14% Asian, 0.07% from other races, and 1.05% from two or more races. Hispanic or Latino of any race were 0.35% of the population.

There were 584 households, out of which 27.6% had children under the age of 18 living with them, 61.3% were married couples living together, 5.8% had a female householder with no husband present, and 29.3% were non-families. Of all households 22.4% were made up of individuals, and 9.4% had someone living alone who was 65 years of age or older. The average household size was 2.45 and the average family size was 2.86.

In the town, the population was spread out, with 23.1% under the age of 18, 4.7% from 18 to 24, 27.8% from 25 to 44, 29.7% from 45 to 64, and 14.8% who were 65 years of age or older. The median age was 42 years. For every 100 females, there were 98.2 males. For every 100 females age 18 and over, there were 95.4 males.

The median income for a household in the town was $40,391, and the median income for a family was $43,512. Males had a median income of $33,083 versus $25,139 for females. The per capita income for the town was $18,995. About 4.0% of families and 5.8% of the population were below the poverty line, including 7.6% of those under age 18 and 3.3% of those age 65 or over.

== Sites of interest ==
- Douglas Mountain
- Sebago Historical Society & Museum

== Education ==
The school district is Sebago Public Schools.

== Notable people ==
- George Herbert Babb, state legislator
- Vinal G. Good, state legislator and insurance agent
