= Lewis Barker (Maine politician) =

American politician (1818–1890)

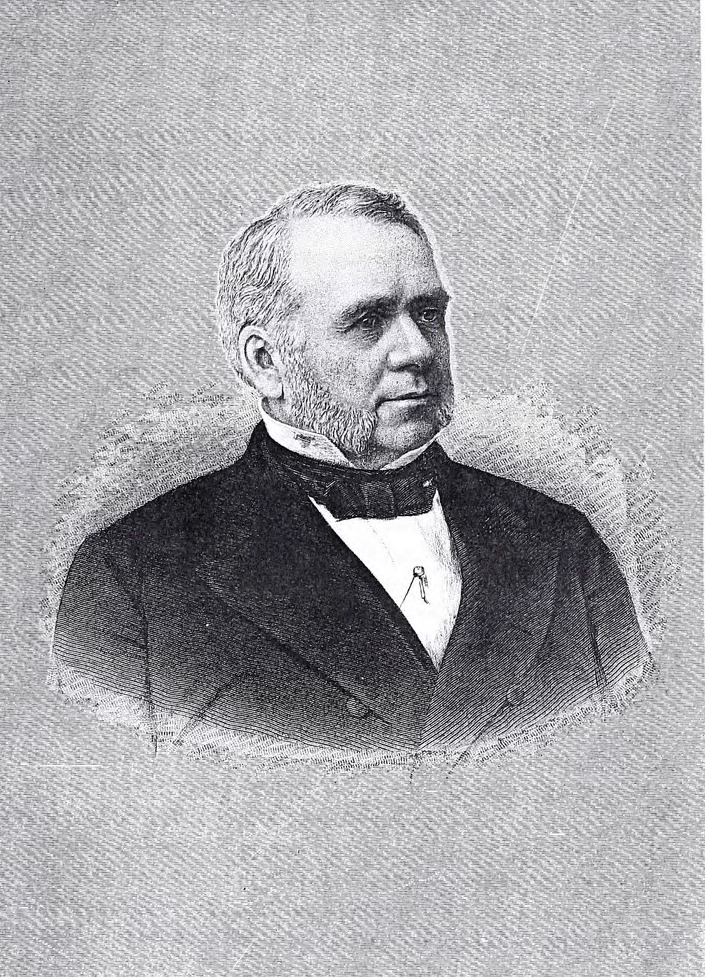

Member of the Executive Council of Maine

Member of Maine Senate
- In office 1865–1866
- Preceded by: James M. Stone
- Succeeded by: Theodore C. Woodman

34th Speaker of the Maine House of Representatives
- In office 1867–1867
- Preceded by: James M. Stone
- Succeeded by: Theodore C. Woodman

Member of Maine House of Representatives
- In office 1870–1870

Member of Maine House of Representatives
- In office 1867–1867

Member of Maine House of Representatives
- In office 1864–1864

Personal details
- Born: February 18, 1818 Exeter, Maine
- Died: October 9, 1890 (aged 72) Bangor, Maine
- Spouse(s): Elizabeth Hill, m. August 2, 1846
- Children: Evelyn Barker, b. May 11, 1848, d. November 3, 1872.; Lewis Amasa Barker, b. August 12, 1854, d. January 16, 1890.
- Education: Exeter Academy, and Foxcroft Academy

Lewis Barker (February 18, 1818 – October 9, 1890) was an American lawyer, State Senator, and State Representative from Bangor, Maine who was the Speaker of the Maine House of Representatives.

Political offices
Preceded by James M. Stone	34th Speaker of the Maine House of Representatives; 1867-1868	Succeeded by Theodore C. Woodman
