= Luther Youngdahl =

American state governor and federal judge

Luther W. Youngdahl
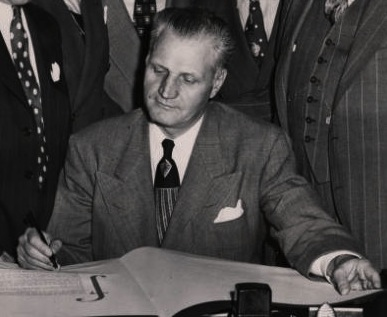
- Youngdahl in 1949

Senior Judge of the United States District Court for the District of Columbia
- In office May 29, 1966 – June 21, 1978

Judge of the United States District Court for the District of Columbia
- In office August 29, 1951 – May 29, 1966
- Appointed by: Harry S. Truman
- Preceded by: Thomas Alan Goldsborough
- Succeeded by: John Lewis Smith Jr.

27th Governor of Minnesota
- In office January 8, 1947 – September 27, 1951
- Lieutenant: C. Elmer Anderson
- Preceded by: Edward John Thye
- Succeeded by: C. Elmer Anderson

Personal details
- Born: Luther Wallace Youngdahl; May 29, 1896 Minneapolis, Minnesota, U.S.
- Died: June 21, 1978 (aged 82) Washington, D.C., U.S.
- Resting place: Arlington National Cemetery
- Party: Republican
- Relatives: Oscar Youngdahl (brother)
- Education: Gustavus Adolphus College (B.A.); Mitchell Hamline School of Law (LL.B.)

Luther Wallace Youngdahl (May 29, 1896 – June 21, 1978) was an American judge and politician who served as the 27th governor of Minnesota and a United States district judge of the United States District Court for the District of Columbia.

== Education and career ==
Born on May 29, 1896, in Minneapolis, Minnesota, Youngdahl graduated from Minneapolis South High School. He then received a Bachelor of Arts degree in 1919 from Gustavus Adolphus College and a Bachelor of Laws in 1921 from the Minnesota College of Law (now Mitchell Hamline School of Law). He served as a Second Lieutenant in the United States Army during World War I. He was an assistant city attorney for Minneapolis from 1921 to 1924 and in private practice from 1924 to 1930. He was a judge of the Minneapolis Municipal Court from 1930 to 1936 and of the Minnesota District Court for the Fourth Judicial District from 1936 to 1942. He was an associate justice of the Minnesota Supreme Court from 1942 to 1946. A member of the Republican Party, he was the governor of Minnesota from January 8, 1947, to September 27, 1951.

== As governor ==
One of Youngdahl's major plans was to expand to welfare to meet the large postwar rise in demand for basic services. His focus was "to prevent distress among dependent children, the blind, and the aged.” Youngdahl also campaigned on funding for education, citing underpaid teachers and the need for new school buildings. His most ambitious plan was called the 5-Point Housing Plan. It was as follows:

1. Establish a state housing commission with full-time executive staff working with an advisory citizens' volunteer group.

2. Defer all but the most essential public construction until the housing shortage ends.

3. Pass legislation to permit the state and municipalities to take advantage of present and future federal housing acts.

4. Provide for state rent control if federal control is removed while need for such regulation still exists.

5. Enact neighborhood redevelopment laws permitting public acquisition of blighted areas that could thus be cleared of obsolete structures and the lots resold to citizens for private home construction.

Youngdahl was also greatly concerned about mental health, and made reforms to Minnesota's mental health care system. In October 1949, he burned more than 300 straitjackets and restraints. He also increased funding for public education, expanded public housing, increased benefits for veterans, created activities to improve young people's health, desegregated the Minnesota National Guard, passed anti-discrimination laws in employment, and banned slot machines and strengthened anti-liquor laws despite the legislature's opposition.

== Federal judicial service ==
Youngdahl was a popular governor who won reelection easily in 1950, but as early as 1949 he expressed to a friend his desire to return to the judiciary, this time at the federal level. Believing that Youngdahl would be the strongest candidate the Republicans could run against him when he sought reelection in 1954, upon learning of Judge Thomas Alan Goldsborough's death from a heart attack, Minnesota's junior U.S. senator, Hubert Humphrey, proposed nominating Youngdahl to Goldsborough's now-vacant seat on the United States District Court for the District of Columbia in a meeting with President Harry S. Truman on July 2, 1951. Noting that Youngdahl was the only governor who had written a letter commending him for his recent decision to fire General Douglas MacArthur, Truman agreed to the suggestion.

After meeting with Youngdahl on July 5, Truman appointed him the next day to the vacancy on the D.C. district court. The United States Senate confirmed Youngdahl on August 28, 1951, and he received his commission the next day. He assumed senior status on May 29, 1966, his 70th birthday.

As a senior judge, Youngdahl advocated education and job training for incarcerated criminals and less crowded programs to rehabilitate drug users, believing that harsh punishments failed to reduce crime. In an address to Congress in 1971, Youngdahl praised Democrats for supporting revenue sharing and decentralization and Republicans for their proposed Family Assistance Plan, which would have guaranteed families a minimum income. He said both parties needed to rise above partisan politics and work together.

== Personal life ==
A devout Lutheran, Youngdahl called for "spiritual progress", which he described as a moral and spiritual advance that allows for the establishment of permanent peace and representative government.

His son, William Youngdahl, was a Lutheran pastor in Omaha, Nebraska, whose efforts to encourage his white church members to establish relationships with members of an African-American church in North Omaha were depicted in the 1967 documentary A Time for Burning.

Youngdahl died on June 21, 1978, aged 82, at his home in Washington, D.C., after a "lingering illness". He is interred in Arlington National Cemetery.

Party political offices
Preceded by Edward John Thye	Republican nominee for Governor of Minnesota; 1946, 1948, 1950	Succeeded by C. Elmer Anderson
Political offices
Preceded by Edward John Thye	27th governor of Minnesota; 1947–1951	Succeeded by C. Elmer Anderson
Legal offices
Preceded by Thomas Alan Goldsborough	Judge of the United States District Court for the District of Columbia; 1951–1966	Succeeded by John Lewis Smith Jr.
