= 1821 Maine gubernatorial election =

- September 10, 1821
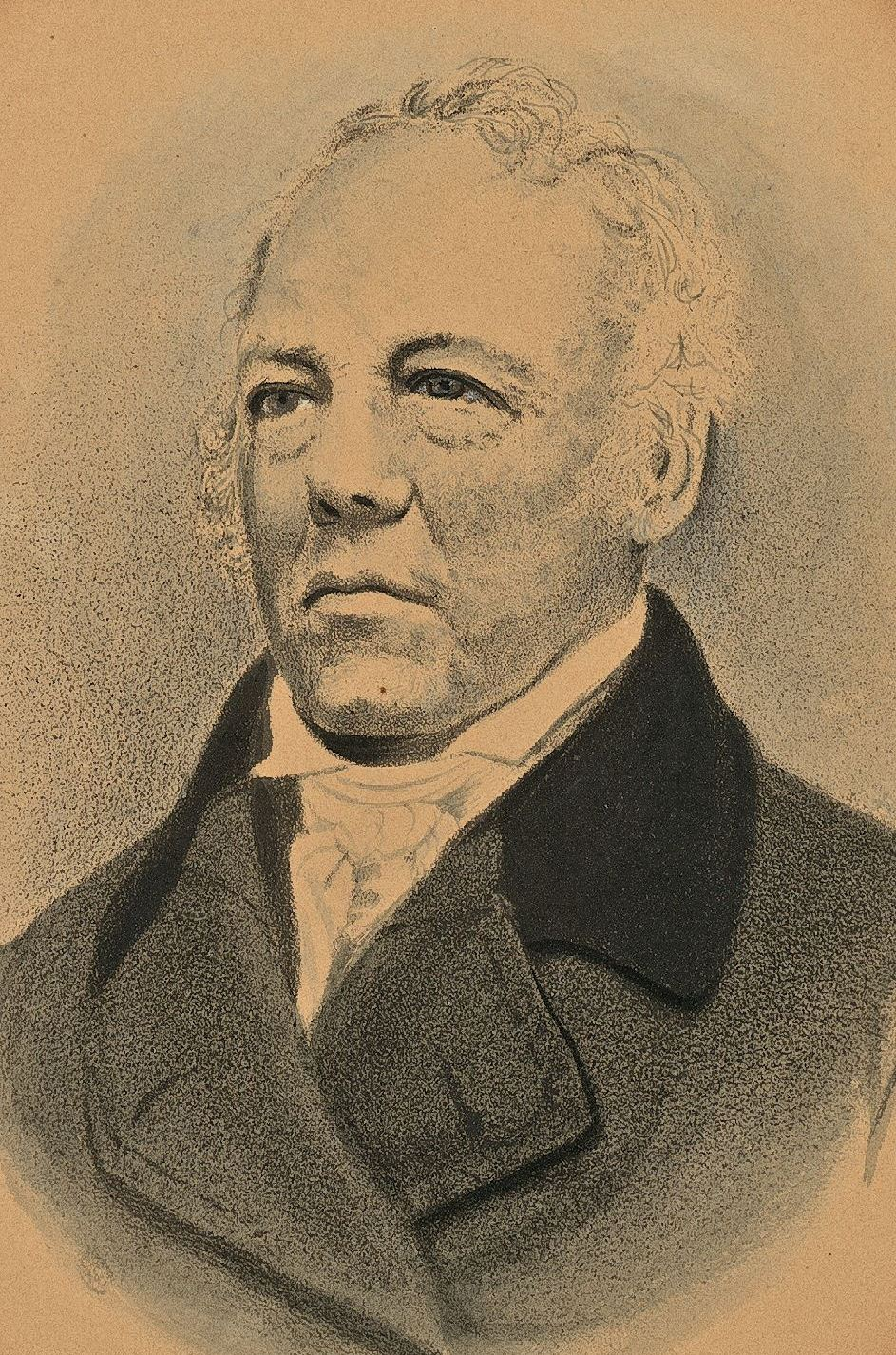

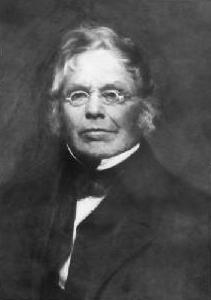

Nominee	Albion Parris	Ezekiel Whitman	Joshua Wingate, Jr.
Party	Democratic-Republican	Federalist	Democratic-Republican
Popular vote	12,887	6,811	3,879
Percentage	52.84%	27.93%	15.91%
County results
Parris
40–50%
50–60%
60–70%
70–80%
Whitman
30–40%
Governor before election
William D. Williamson
Democratic
Elected Governor
Albion Parris
Democratic

The 1821 Maine gubernatorial election took place on September 10, 1821 to elect the Governor of Maine. Democratic-Republican candidate Albion Parris defeated Federalist candidate Ezekiel Whitman and Democratic-Republican Joshua Wingate, Jr.

== Background ==
The incumbent Democratic-Republican Governor William D. Williamson entered the office in May 1821 when Governor William King resigned. Williamson did not stand for re-election but instead ran for the U.S. House of Representatives.

=== Candidates ===
- Albion Parris, Judge on the United States District Court for the District of Maine, former U.S. representative (Democratic-Republican)
- Joshua Wingate, Jr. (Democratic-Republican)
- Ezekiel Whitman, U.S. representative (Federalist)

== Results ==
1821 Maine gubernatorial election (Note: Some sources give the result as Parris 13,283, Whitman 7,054, Wingate 4,255, Scattering 582. These figures include the votes from seven towns which were rejected.)
Party	Candidate	Votes	%
Democratic-Republican	Albion Parris	12,887	52.84%
Federalist	Ezekiel Whitman	6,811	27.93%
Democratic-Republican	Joshua Wingate, Jr.	3,879	15.91%
Write-in		811	3.33%
Majority		6,076	24.91%
Total votes		24,388	100.00%
Democratic-Republican hold			

== Aftermath ==
Williamson's congressional campaign was successful and he resigned as Governor on December 5, 1821 to take his new office. Following the rules of succession, he was followed in office by Speaker of the Maine House of Representatives Benjamin Ames. In January a new legislature was sworn in and Ames believed that the new president of the Maine Senate should be Governor. So he resigned and Daniel Rose served as governor for three days before Parris was inaugurated on January 5, 1822.
