= Senator Williamson =

Senator Williamson may refer to:

- Ben M. Williamson (1864–1941), U.S. Senator from Kentucky from 1930 to 1931
- George Williamson (Florida politician) (1938–2010), Florida State Senate
- James Allen Williamson (born 1951), Oklahoma State Senate
- John N. Williamson (1855–1943), Oregon State Senate
- Joseph Williamson (Maine politician) (1789–1854), Maine State Senate
- Norris C. Williamson (1874–1949), Louisiana State Senate
- Pliny W. Williamson (1876–1958), New York State Senate
- Robert McAlpin Williamson (1804–1859), Republic of Texas Senate and Texas State Senate
- Rollin S. Williamson (1839–1889), Illinois State Senate
- William D. Williamson (1779–1846), Massachusetts State Senate
