= Senator Virgin =

Senator Virgin may refer to:

- Harry R. Virgin (1854–1932), Maine State Senate
- Noah Virgin (1812–1892), Wisconsin State Senate
- William Wirt Virgin (1823–1893), Maine State Senate
