= Theodore Curtis =

Theodore Curtis may refer to:

- Theodore S. Curtis (1900–1988), American coach, administrator, and politician
- Theodore S. Curtis Jr. (1940–2015), American politician from Maine
