= 1818 Massachusetts's 20th congressional district special election =

A special election was held in Massachusetts's 20th congressional district (in the District of Maine) on March 16, 1818, to fill a vacancy left by the resignation of Albion K. Parris (DR) on February 3, 1818 after being named a judge of the United States District Court for the District of Maine.

== Electoral results ==
| Candidate | Party | Votes | Percent |
|---|---|---|---|
| Enoch Lincoln | Democratic-Republican | 1,294 | 57.0% |
| Judah Dana | | 584 | 25.7% |
| Samuel A. Bradley | Federalist | 392 | 17.3% |

Lincoln took his seat on November 16, 1818 and would continue to serve in the 16th, 17th (for Maine's 7th district after the separation of Maine), the 18th and part of the 19th Congress (the latter two Congresses for Maine's 5th district after redistricting)

== See also ==
- List of special elections to the United States House of Representatives
