= George M. Seiders =

American lawyer and politician

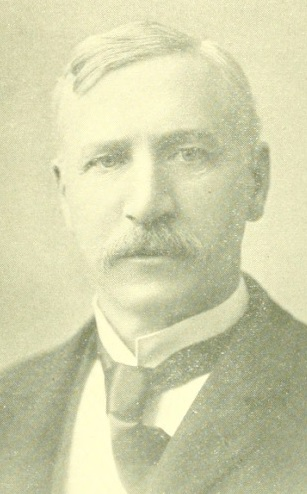
- From 1902's An Album of the Attorneys of Maine

28th Attorney General of Maine
- In office January 1901 – January 4, 1905
- Governor: John Fremont Hill
- Preceded by: William T. Haines
- Succeeded by: Hannibal E. Hamlin

64th President of the Maine Senate
- In office January 2, 1895 – January 6, 1897
- Preceded by: Albert Spear
- Succeeded by: Albert R. Day

Member of the Maine Senate from the 2nd district
- In office January 4, 1893 – January 6, 1897
- Preceded by: Charles Libby
- Succeeded by: Josiah H. Drummond Jr.

Personal details
- Born: George Melville Seiders; January 15, 1844 Union, Maine, U.S.
- Died: May 26, 1915 (aged 71) Portland, Maine, U.S.
- Party: Republican
- Education: Bowdoin College

Military service
- Allegiance: United States (Union)
- Branch/service: United States Army
- Years of service: 1862–1863
- Unit: 24th Maine Infantry
- Battles/wars: American Civil War

George Melville Seiders (January 15, 1844 – May 26, 1915) was an American lawyer and politician from Maine.

== Early life ==
Seiders was born and raised on a farm in Union, Maine. In 1862 at the age of 18, he joined the 24th Maine Volunteer Infantry Regiment in Augusta, Maine. He and his regiment spent most of their 9 months of military service in Louisiana. Of particular note, the 24th Maine participated in the Siege of Port Hudson. The regiment mustered out in August 1863.

== Politics ==
Seiders, a Republican, served as a member of the Maine House of Representatives from North Yarmouth, Maine in 1878. In his first term, he was assigned to that body's important Judiciary Committee.

In 1880, he moved to Portland, Maine, where he resided for the remainder of his life. In 1892 and 1894, Seiders was elected to the Maine Senate. During his second term, he was elected by his colleagues as the President of the Senate. In 1901, he was elected Maine Attorney General, a position he held until 1904.

He died in Portland on May 26, 1915.
