= Senator Scammon =

Senator Scammon may refer to:

- J. Young Scammon (1812–1890), Illinois State Senate
- John Scammon (1865–1940), New Hampshire State Senate
- Seth Scamman (1811–1894), Maine State Senate
