= Charles Gurney =

Charles Gurney may refer to:

- Charles E. Gurney (1874–1945), American lawyer and politician
- Charles W. Gurney (1840–1913), American business man
- Charles Raymond Gurney (1906–1942), Australian aviator
