= Seider =

Seider may refer to:

== People ==
=== Seider ===
- Christopher Seider (1758–1770), American murder victim
- Ja'Juan Seider (born 1977), American football player and coach
- Meyer Seider (1880s–1930), Russian assassin
- Moritz Seider (born 2001), German ice hockey player

=== Seiders ===
- George M. Seiders (1844–1915), American lawyer and politician
- Joe Seiders (born 1980), American musician
