= Senator Weeks =

Senator Weeks may refer to:

== Members of the United States Senate ==
- John W. Weeks (1860–1926), U.S. Senator from Massachusetts from 1913 to 1919
- Sinclair Weeks (1893–1972), U.S. Senator from Massachusetts in 1944

== U.S. state senate members ==
- Dave Weeks (born 1960), Vermont State Senate
- George E. Weeks (1837–1893), Maine State Senate
- George G. Weeks (1860–1923), Maine State Senate
- Harold E. Weeks (c. 1890–1939), Maine State Senate
- John E. Weeks (1853–1949), Vermont State Senate
- Russ Weeks (1942–2024), West Virginia State Senate
- Thompson Weeks (1832–1901), Wisconsin State Senate
- William D. Weeks (1926–2023), Massachusetts State Senate
