= Senator Clifford =

Senator Clifford may refer to:

- Bill Clifford (politician) (fl. 2020s), Kansas State Senate
- Eugene A. Clifford (1886–1941), Wisconsin State Senate
- John H. Clifford (1809–1876), Massachusetts State Senate
- Nathan Clifford (Maine politician) (1867–1919), Maine State Senate
- Robert W. Clifford (born 1937), Maine State Senate
