= Harold Weeks =

Harold Weeks may refer to:

- Harold E. Weeks (c. 1890–1939), American politician from Maine
- Harold Weeks (musician) (1893–1967), American jazz musician and composer from Seattle, Washington.
- Harold J. Week (1884–1936), American politician and businessman
- Harold Weekes (1880–1950), American college football player
