= Senator Townsend =

Senator Townsend may refer to:

== Members of the United States Senate ==
- Charles E. Townsend (1856–1924), U.S. Senator from Michigan from 1911 to 1923
- John G. Townsend Jr. (1871–1964), U.S. Senator from Delaware from 1929 to 1941

== United States state senate members ==
- Bryan Townsend (American politician) (born 1981), Delaware State Senate
- Charles Townsend (Ohio politician) (1834–1900), Ohio State Senate
- Fred Townsend (1862–1918), Iowa State Senate
- John Townsend (New York City) (1789–1863), New York State Senate
- Manly B. Townsend (1803–1849), Maine State Senate
- Randolph Townsend (born 1947), Nevada State Senate
- Wayne Townsend (1926–2015), Indiana State Senate
- William Townsend (New York politician) (1848–1919), New York State Senate

== See also ==
- Norton Strange Townshend (1815–1895), Ohio State Senate
