= Charles Goddard =

Charles Goddard may refer to:

- Charles Goddard (playwright) (1879–1951), American playwright and screenwriter
- Charles Goddard (priest) (1770–1848), Anglican priest
- Charles Backus Goddard (1796–1864), American lawyer and politician
- Charles Goddard (politician) (1825–?), American lawyer, politician and diplomat
