= Oliver B. Clason =

American lawyer and politician

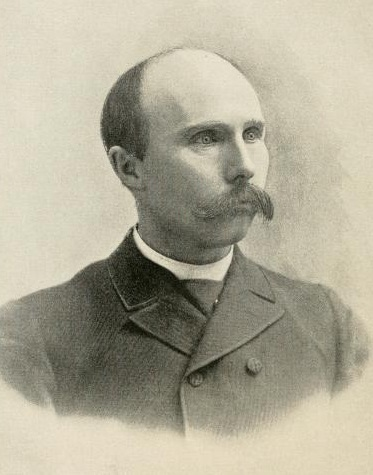
- Frontispiece of 1892's Stephen Clason of Stamford, Connecticut, in 1654 and Some of His Descendants

66th President of the Maine Senate
- In office January 4, 1899 – January 2, 1901
- Preceded by: Albert R. Day
- Succeeded by: Hannibal E. Hamlin

Member of the Maine Senate from the 7th district
- In office January 6, 1897 – January 2, 1901
- Preceded by: Elliott Wood
- Succeeded by: Caleb C. Libby
- Constituency: Kennebec County

Member of the Executive Council of Maine from the 4th district
- In office January 1895 – January 2, 1897
- Governor: Henry B. Cleaves
- Preceded by: Edwin O. Clark
- Succeeded by: Fritz H. Twitchell

Member of the Maine House of Representatives from Gardiner
- In office January 2, 1889 – January 4, 1893
- Preceded by: Gustavus Moore
- Succeeded by: Van R. Beedle

Personal details
- Born: Oliver Barrett Clason; September 28, 1850 Gardiner, Maine, US
- Died: December 10, 1930 (aged 80) Gardiner, Maine, US
- Party: Republican
- Education: Bates College
- Occupation: Lawyer; politician

Oliver Barrett Clason (September 28, 1850- December 10, 1930) was an American lawyer and politician from Maine.

Clason grew up in Gardiner, Maine and graduated from Bates College in 1877. He taught for several years and then studied law and passed the bar in October 1881. He later partnered with future Chief Justice of the Maine Supreme Judicial Court, fellow Senate President, and Bates alumnus Albert Spear.

He served in the Maine House of Representatives from 1889 to 1892, as mayor of Gardiner from 1894 to 1896, and in the Maine Senate in 1897 and 1899. During his second term, he was elected President of the Maine Senate.
