= Senator Goddard =

Senator Goddard may refer to:

- Charles Backus Goddard (1796–1864), Ohio State Senate
- Charles Goddard (politician) (1825–1889), Maine State Senate
- Dan Goddard (born 1947), Kansas State Senate
- Robert Hale Ives Goddard (1837–1916), Rhode Island State Senate
- O. F. Goddard (1853–1943), Montana State Senate

== See also ==
- Abel Godard (1835–1891), New York
