= Senator Gurney =

Senator Gurney may refer to:

- Charles E. Gurney (1874–1945), member of the Maine State Senate from 1919 to 1922
- Edward Gurney (1914–1996), U.S. Senator from Florida from 1969 to 1974
- John Chandler Gurney (1896–1985), U.S. Senator from South Dakota from 1939 to 1951
