= John Goodenow =

John Goodenow may refer to:

- John Elliot Goodenow (1812–1902), American politician from Iowa
- John M. Goodenow (1782–1838), U.S. Representative from Ohio
- John H. Goodenow (1833–1906), American politician from Maine

== See also ==
- John Goodnow (1858–1907), businessman and American diplomat
