= Senator Hillman =

Senator Hillman may refer to:

- Earle M. Hillman (1902–1975), Maine State Senate
- Joyce Hillman-Kortum (1936–2019), Nebraska State Senate
- Mark Hillman (born 1967), Colorado State Senate
