= Senator Chapman (disambiguation) =

Virgil Chapman (1895–1951) was a U.S. Senator from Kentucky from 1949 to 1951. Senator Chapman may also refer to:

- Charles R. Chapman (1827–1897), Connecticut State Senate
- Henry Chapman (American politician) (1804–1891), Pennsylvania State Senate
- Hiram Chapman (died 1864), Maine State Senate
- Jake Chapman (politician) (born 1985), Iowa State Senate
- Jeff Chapman (politician) (fl. 1970s–2010s), Georgia State Senate
- John Grant Chapman (1798–1856), Maryland State Senate
- Laura Wakim Chapman (born 1984), West Virginia State Senate
- Orlow W. Chapman (1831–1890), New York State Senate
- Pleasant T. Chapman (1854–1931), Illinois State Senate
- Theodore S. Chapman (1849–1914), Illinois State Senate
- Thomas W. Chapman (1814–1905), Ohio State Senate
