= Joseph Campbell (20th-century Maine politician) =

American politician

Joseph B. Campbell (died November 30, 1999) was an American politician from Maine. Campbell served three non-consecutive terms in the Maine Legislature, including one (1948-1950) in the Maine House of Representatives and two (1962-1964 and 1966–1968) in the Maine Senate. During his final term in the Senate, Campbell served as President. He was a Republican representing the city of Augusta, Maine.

Campbell died at the age of 91 on November 30, 1999.
