= Hannibal E. Hamlin =

American lawyer and politician (1858–1938)

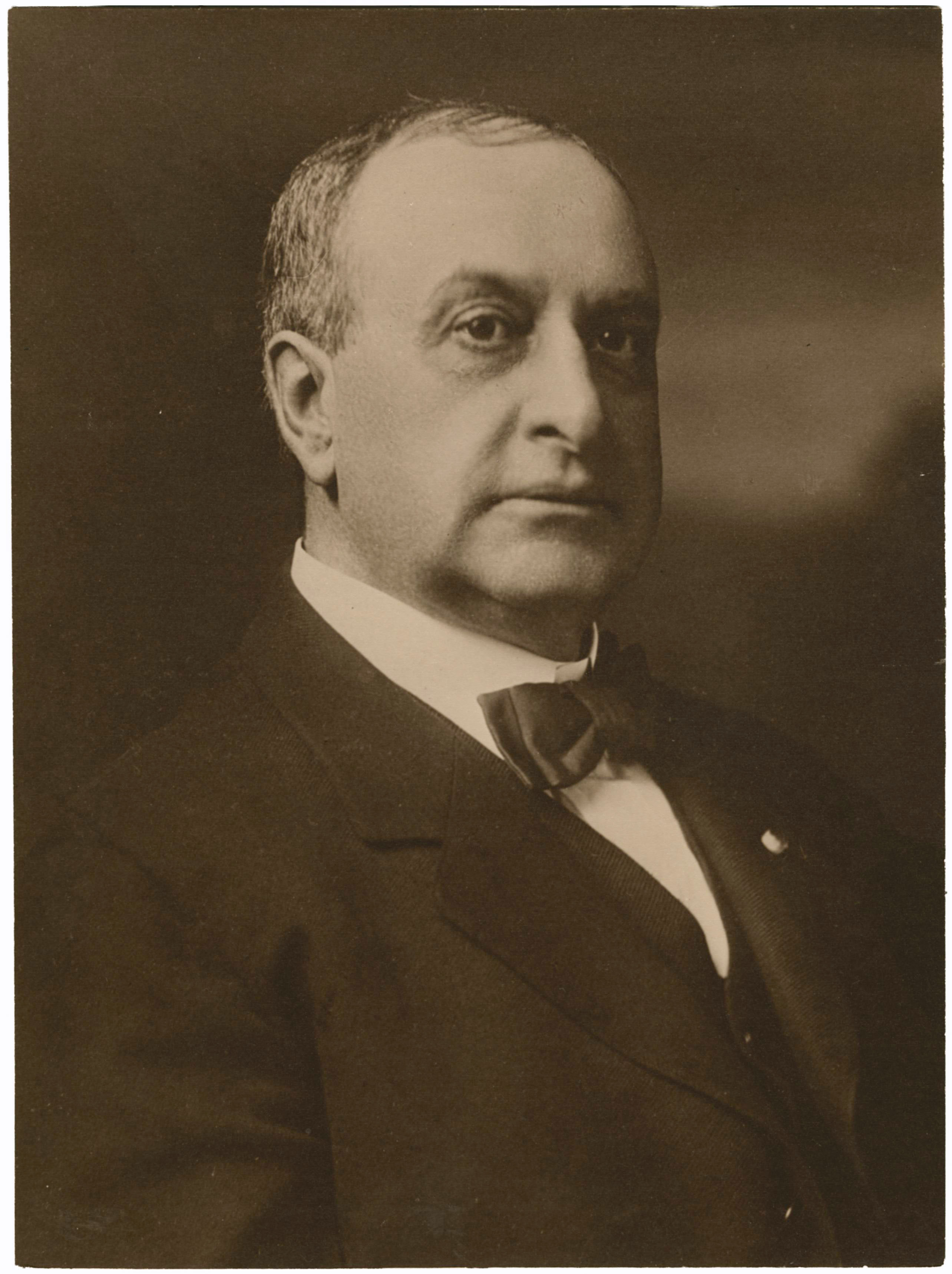

29th Attorney General of Maine
- In office January 4, 1905 – January 6, 1909
- Governor: William T. Cobb
- Preceded by: George M. Seiders
- Succeeded by: Warren C. Philbrook

67th President of the Maine Senate
- In office January 2, 1901 – January 7, 1903
- Preceded by: Oliver B. Clason
- Succeeded by: Harry R. Virgin

Member of the Maine Senate from the 14th district
- In office January 4, 1899 – January 7, 1903 Serving with Albert R. Buck
- Preceded by: Gilbert E. Simpson
- Succeeded by: Edward S. Clark
- Constituency: Hancock County

Member of the Maine House of Representatives from Ellsworth
- In office January 4, 1893 – January 6, 1897
- Preceded by: Andrew P. Wiswell
- Succeeded by: Hutson B. Saunders

Personal details
- Born: Hannibal Emery Hamlin; September 28, 1858 Hampden, Maine, U.S.
- Died: March 6, 1938 (aged 79) Bangor, Maine, U.S.
- Resting place: Mount Hope Cemetery
- Party: Republican
- Parents: Hannibal Hamlin; Ellen Emery Hamlin
- Relatives: Charles Hamlin (half-brother); Cyrus Hamlin (half-brother)
- Education: Colby College (AB); Boston University (LLB)
- Occupation: Lawyer; politician

Hannibal Emery Hamlin (August 22, 1858 – March 6, 1938) was an American lawyer and politician from Maine. His father, Hannibal Hamlin, served as Vice President of the United States from 1861 to 1865.

Hamlin grew up in Bangor, Maine and graduated from Colby College in 1879 and Boston University School of Law in 1882. In 1883 he joined Senator Eugene Hale to create Hale & Hamlin, a law firm based in Ellsworth, Maine that still exists today and is recognized as the oldest law firm in the State of Maine.

Residing in Ellsworth, Maine, he served in the Maine House of Representatives from 1893–1894 to 1895-1896 and in the Maine Senate from 1899 to 1902. During his second term, he was elected President of the Maine Senate (1901–1902). He later served as the president of the Maine State Bar Association from 1923 to 1924.
