= Rufus P. Tapley =

American judge (1823–1893)

Rufus Preston Tapley (January 2, 1823 – April 10, 1893), of Saco, Maine, was a justice of the Maine Supreme Judicial Court from December 21, 1865 to December 21, 1872.

Born in Danvers, Massachusetts, Tapley moved to Saco, Maine, in 1846, where he read law first in the office of Bradley Haines and subsequently with Bradbury & Eastman and was admitted to the York County bar in the May Term of 1848.

During the American Civil War, he served as colonel in the 27th Maine Infantry Regiment from October 1862, to February 1863.

In 1864 and 1865 he served in the Maine Legislature, and on December 21, 1865, was appointed as an associate justice of the Supreme court of Maine, which office he held seven years, until December 21, 1872.

He then resumed practice in Saco. He was retained as counsel for Lewis Wagner, the defendant in the Isles of Shoals murder case, and was also associated on one side or another in many important trials. His last act as an attorney before the supreme court was to move an adjournment of the January term of the supreme court at Saco, when news was received of the death of Justice William Wirt Virgin.

Tapley died in Saco at the age of 70.

Political offices
Preceded by Woodbury Davis	Justice of the Maine Supreme Judicial Court; 1865–1872	Succeeded by William Wirt Virgin
