= Nathaniel A. Burpee =

American politician

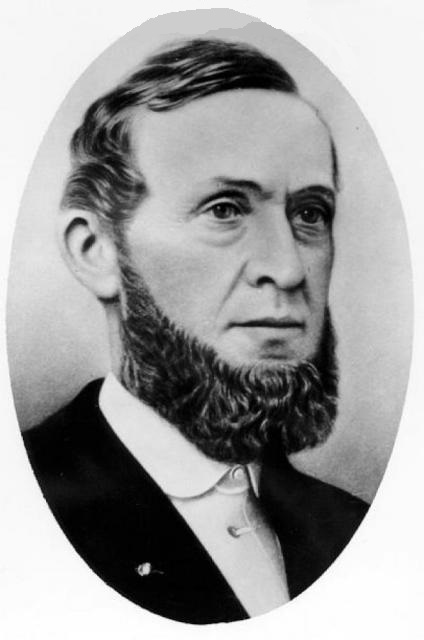

Member of the Maine Senate
- In office 1858–1859
- In office 1866–1867

Personal details
- Born: Nathaniel Adams Burpee; March 13, 1816 Grafton, Massachusetts, U.S.
- Died: December 11, 1887 (aged 71) Rockland, Maine, U.S.
- Party: Republican
- Spouse: Mary Jane Partridge (m. 1838)
- Children: 5
- Parent(s): Heman Horton Burpee; Satira Burpee (née Redding)

Nathaniel Adams Burpee (March 13, 1816 – December 11, 1887) was an American politician from Maine.

== Biography ==
Nathaniel Burpee was born on 13 March 1816 in Grafton, Massachusetts to Heman and Satira Burpee. He would go on to be the eldest of seven children.

In adulthood, Burpee founded a livery and blacksmith business with his younger brother Samuel. By 1830, their business had evolved to include undertaking and funeral services.

On 27 December 1838 he married Mary Jane Patridge, with whom he had five children.

A house painter from Rockland, Maine, Burpee served two single-year terms in the Maine House of Representatives (1854-1855) and four single-year terms in the Maine Senate (1858-1859; 1866-1867). During his final term, he was chosen to be President of the Maine Senate.
