= George Barrows (politician) =

American politician (1822–1904)

George Bradley Barrows (1822–1904) was an American politician from Maine. A Republican from Fryeburg, he served as President of the Maine Senate during the 1864 session. He had previously served in the Maine House of Representatives in 1859 and 1862 as well as the Senate in 1863.

== Education ==
Barrows graduated from Dartmouth College in 1842. He then studied law with his father though he never practiced. A collection of his letters are deposited at the Baker-Berry Library at Dartmouth.

== Accomplishments ==
Barrows helped found the West Oxford Agricultural Society, which has sponsored the Fryeburg Fair since 1851. He was also a member of the State Board of Agriculture as well as agriculture editor for the Portland Daily Press newspaper.
