= John L. Cutler =

American politician (1829–1904)

John Lysander Cutler (March 9, 1829-June 15, 1904) was an American businessperson and politician from Bangor, Maine. Cutler was born and raised in Exeter, Maine. He moved to Bangor at the age of 16 and was involved in the booming lumber trade. He served as president of the Maine Senate during the 61st Maine Legislature from 1883 to 1884. He died in June 1904 after a long period of poor health. He is buried at Mount Hope Cemetery.
