= Robert A. Marden =

American lawyer

Member of the Maine Senate
- In office 1960–1964

Personal details
- Born: January 4, 1927 Waterville, Maine, U.S.
- Died: October 29, 2017 (aged 90) Waterville, Maine, U.S.
- Party: Republican
- Education: Colby College; Boston University School of Law

Robert Allen Marden (January 4, 1927 – October 29, 2017) was an American politician and attorney from Maine. Marden, a Republican, served two terms in the Maine Senate, representing part of Kennebec County, including his residence in Waterville, Maine.

Marden was born in Waterville and graduated from Waterville High School before studying at Colby College and Boston University School of Law. He was an acquaintance of future U.S. Senator George J. Mitchell. He was elected to the Maine Senate in November 1962 and served two terms, including one as President from 1963 to 1964. Blocked from seeking the Governor's seat by incumbent Republican John H. Reed, Marden left the Maine Legislature and returned to Waterville, where he set up a law firm.

Marden was honored by the Harold Alfond Foundation upon his retirement as board trustee in 2013.
