= David Dinsmore Stewart =

American lawyer and politician

David Dinsmore Stewart (October 22, 1823 – December 3, 1917) was an American lawyer and politician from Maine. A Republican from St. Albans, he served as President of the Maine Senate during the 1865 session. He had previously served as Somerset County attorney in 1850 and 1851, in the Maine House of Representatives in 1862, and in the Senate in 1863 and 1864.

Stewart was born on October 22, 1823, in Corinna, Maine to David Steward, a Protestant minister, and Elizabeth Merrick, a teacher. After attending local schools in Corinna, he studied law at Bowdoin College. After graduation, he moved to Somerset County, Maine and passed the bar exam there in 1847. He continued practicing law until his death in 1917 and was regarded as one of the top lawyers in the state. Stewart was elected to the board of the Maine Historical Society in 1879.
