= Leon F. Higgins =

American businessman and politician

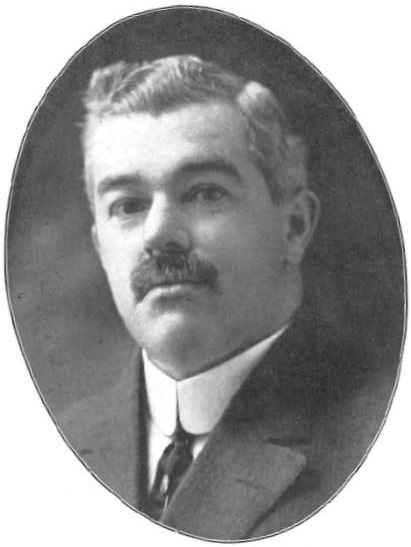
- Official portrait, 1919

76th President of the Maine Senate
- In office January 1, 1919 – January 5, 1921
- Preceded by: Taber D. Bailey
- Succeeded by: Percival P. Baxter

Member of the Maine Senate from the 10th district
- In office January 3, 1917 – January 5, 1921
- Constituency: Penobscot County

Member of the Maine House of Representatives from Brewer
- In office January 2, 1913 – January 3, 1917
- Preceded by: Patrick H. Dunn
- Succeeded by: Victor H. Mutty

Personal details
- Born: Leon Forrest Higgins; April 29, 1870
- Died: July 28, 1923 (aged 53)
- Party: Republican

Leon Forrest Higgins (April 29, 1870 – July 28, 1923) was an American businessperson and politician from Maine. Higgins, a Republican from Brewer, served as an Alderman in 1900, in the Maine House of Representatives in 1913-16 and in the Maine Senate (1917-1920). During his final term (1919-1920), Higgins was elected Senate President.

Higgins owned a successful insurance business and was an incorporator of Brewer Savings Bank.
