= David Sewall =

American judge (1735–1825)

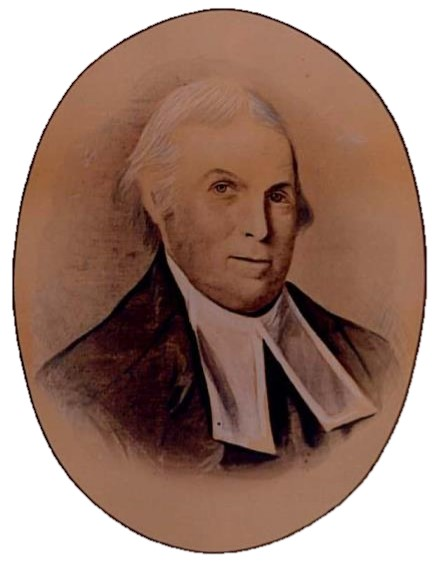

Judge of the United States District Court for the District of Maine
- In office September 26, 1789 – January 9, 1818
- Appointed by: George Washington
- Preceded by: Seat established by 1 Stat. 73
- Succeeded by: Albion Parris

Justice of the Massachusetts Supreme Judicial Court
- In office 1777–1789
- Preceded by: William Cushing
- Succeeded by: Robert Treat Paine

Personal details
- Born: David Sewall; October 7, 1735 York, Province of Massachusetts Bay, British America
- Died: October 22, 1825 (aged 90) York, Maine
- Education: Harvard University (A.B.) read law

David Sewall (October 7, 1735 – October 22, 1825) was a United States district judge of the United States District Court for the District of Maine.

== Education and career ==
Born on October 7, 1735, in York, in that area of the Province of Massachusetts Bay that would eventually become the State of Maine, British America, Sewall received an Artium Baccalaureus degree in 1755 from Harvard University and read law in 1760. He entered private practice in York (District of Maine, Massachusetts from October 25, 1780) starting in 1760. He was register of probate for York County, Maine starting in 1766. He was a Justice of the Peace in Maine starting in 1767. He was a member of the York Committee of Correspondence. He was a member of the Legislative Council of Massachusetts (now the Massachusetts Senate) from 1776 to 1777. He was a justice of the Superior Court of Massachusetts (renamed the Massachusetts Supreme Judicial Court in 1780) from 1777 to 1789. He was a delegate to the Massachusetts constitutional convention from 1779 to 1780.

== Federal judicial service ==
Sewall was nominated by President George Washington on September 24, 1789, to the United States District Court for the District of Maine, to a new seat authorized by 1 Stat. 73. He was confirmed by the United States Senate on September 26, 1789, and received his commission the same day. His service terminated on January 9, 1818, due to his resignation.

== Later career ==
Following his resignation from the federal bench, Sewall resumed private practice in York, District of Maine (State of Maine from March 15, 1820) from 1818 to 1825.

== Death ==
Sewall died on October 22, 1825, in York.

== Memberships ==
Sewall was a charter member of the American Academy of Arts and Sciences in 1780. Sewall was elected a member of the American Antiquarian Society in 1814.

== Sources ==
Legal offices
Preceded by William Cushing	Justice of the Massachusetts Supreme Judicial Court; 1777–1789	Succeeded by Robert Treat Paine
Preceded by Seat established by 1 Stat. 73	Judge of the United States District Court for the District of Maine; 1789–1818	Succeeded by Albion Parris
