= Taber D. Bailey =

American lawyer and politician

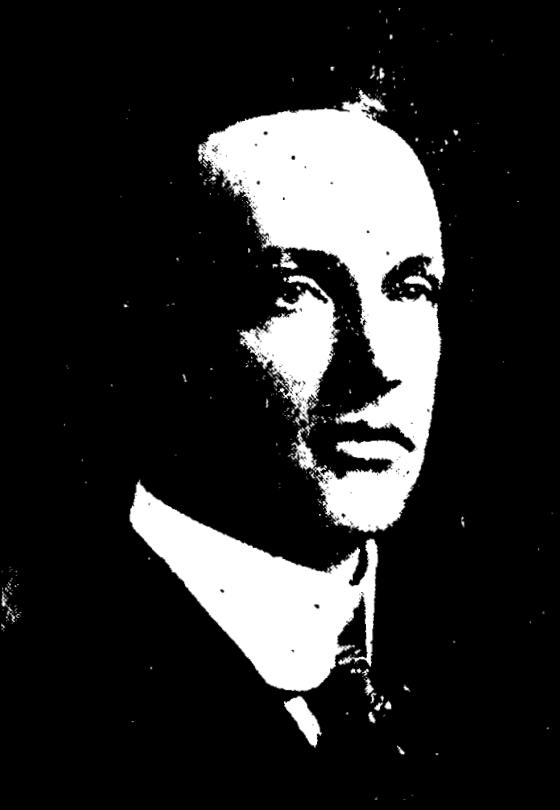

75th President of the Maine Senate
- In office January 3, 1917 – January 1, 1919
- Preceded by: Ira G. Hersey
- Succeeded by: Leon F. Higgins

Member of the Maine Senate from the 10th district
- In office January 3, 1923 – January 7, 1925
- In office January 3, 1917 – January 1, 1919
- In office January 1, 1913 – January 6, 1915
- Constituency: Penobscot County

Personal details
- Born: Taber Davis Bailey; April 5, 1874 Old Town, Maine, U.S.
- Died: January 17, 1938 (aged 63) Bangor, Maine, U.S.
- Party: Republican
- Spouse: Leila M. McDonald
- Occupation: Lawyer; politician

Taber Davis Bailey (April 5, 1874 – January 17, 1938) was an American lawyer and politician from Maine. Bailey, a Republican from Bangor, Maine, represented Penobscot County in the Maine Senate for three non-consecutive terms between 1912 and 1924.

Bailey was born on April 5, 1874, in Old Town, Maine. His father, Charles Bailey was a prominent attorney in Penobscot County and was elected to the Maine House of Representatives in 1870. Taber Bailey grew up in Bangor and graduated from Bangor High School in 1892. He then attended Bowdoin College, from which he earned a Bachelor of Arts degree in 1896. After graduating from Bowdoin, Bailey began studying law in the Bangor law firm of Daniel F. Davis and his father, Charles A. Bailey. Two years later he was admitted to practice law in Maine courts.

== Political experience ==
Bailey was first elected to the Bangor City Council at the age of 23 in 1897. He served on the City Council until 1900. A year later, he was elected President of the Bangor Common Council. In 1902 and 1903, Bailey served as Bangor City Solicitor. In 1912, Bailey was elected to his first term in the Maine Senate. He left the Senate again until his election in 1916, after which he was chosen as President of the Maine Senate by his colleagues. In 1919, he launched an unsuccessful bid for the office of Governor of Maine. He was again elected to the Senate in 1922, to his third and ultimately final term.

He died in Bangor in 1938.
