= Forrest Goodwin =

American politician (1862–1913)

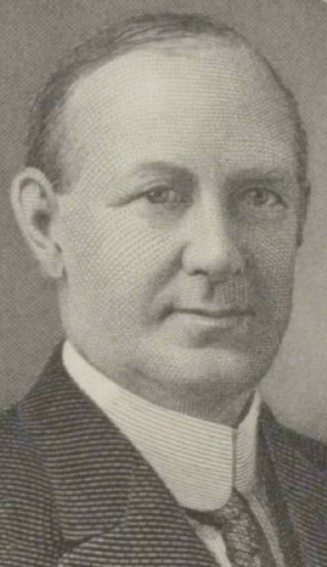

Member of the U.S. House of Representatives from Maine's 3rd district
- In office March 4, 1913 – May 28, 1913
- Preceded by: Samuel Wadsworth Gould
- Succeeded by: John A. Peters

69th President of the Maine Senate
- In office January 4, 1905 – January 2, 1907
- Preceded by: Harry R. Virgin
- Succeeded by: Fred J. Allen

Member of the Maine Senate from the 8th district
- In office January 7, 1903 – January 2, 1907
- Preceded by: George G. Weeks
- Succeeded by: Edward P. Page
- Constituency: Somerset County

Member of the Maine House of Representatives from Skowhegan
- In office January 2, 1889 – January 7, 1891
- Preceded by: Sylvester J. Walton
- Succeeded by: Charles A. Marston

Personal details
- Born: Edward Forrest Goodwin; June 14, 1862 Skowhegan, Maine, U.S.
- Died: May 28, 1913 (aged 50) Portland, Maine, U.S.
- Resting place: South Side Cemetery, Skowhegan, Maine, U.S.
- Party: Republican
- Education: Colby College (AB); Boston University (LLB)
- Occupation: Politician; lawyer

Edward Forrest Goodwin (June 14, 1862 – May 28, 1913) was a United States representative from Maine. He was born in Skowhegan, Maine and attended the common schools, graduated from Skowhegan High School and Bloomfield Academy. He also graduated from Colby College and the Boston University School of Law. He was admitted to the bar in 1889 and commenced practice in Skowhegan.

He was elected a member of the Maine House of Representatives in 1889. He was appointed clerk at the Speaker's table under Speaker Thomas B. Reed in the Fifty-first Congress, was elected a member of the Maine Senate for its 1903 and 1905 sessions, and served as its president in 1905.

He was elected as a Republican to the Sixty-third Congress and served from March 4, 1913, until his death in Portland, Maine on May 28, 1913. His interment was in Southside Cemetery, Skowhegan.

== See also ==
- List of members of the United States Congress who died in office (1900–1949)

U.S. House of Representatives
Preceded by Samuel Wadsworth Gould	Member of the U.S. House of Representatives from Maine's 3rd congressional district March 4, 1913 – May 28, 1913	Succeeded by John A. Peters
