= William Dwight Pennell =

American politician (1847–1920)

William Dwight Pennell (May 21, 1847-April 6, 1920) was an American politician from Maine. Pennell served as president of the Maine Senate from 1885 to 1886.
