= Theodore S. Curtis =

American coach, administrator, and politician (1900–1988)

Biographical details
- Born: October 5, 1900; Freeport, Maine, U.S.
- Died: July 4, 1988 (aged 87); Maine, U.S.^{1}

Coaching career (HC unless noted)

Skiing
- 1930–1961: Maine

Administrative career (AD unless noted)
- 1930–1966: Maine (fac. man. of. ath.)

Member of the Maine Senate from the Penobscot County, Maine
- In office 1967–1968
- Succeeded by: Kenneth P. MacLeod

Personal details
- Party: Republican
- Spouse: Augusta Tolman (m. 1926; died 1988)
- Children: 4, including Theodore S. Curtis Jr.
- Education: University of Maine

Theodore Small Curtis (October 5, 1900 – July 4, 1988) was an American coach, administrator, and politician who was the ski coach at the University of Maine for 31 years. He also served as the school's faculty manager of athletics from 1930 to 1966. From 1967 to 1969, he was a member of the Maine Senate.

== Early life ==
Curtis was born in Freeport, Maine, on October 5, 1900, to Louis and Mary (Small) Curtis. He graduated from Freeport High School and attended the University of Maine, where he played basketball, cross country, and tennis. He graduated in 1923 with a degree in dairy husbandry and worked as an agriculture teacher and coach at the Lee Academy (1923–1928) and Caribou High School (1928–1930). He organized the state's first chapter of the Future Farmers of America.

== University of Maine ==
In 1930, Curtis was appointed faculty manager of athletics at the University of Maine. In this role, he introduced sailing, rifle, tennis, golf, soccer, and basketball as varsity sports and played a role in planning Memorial Gymnasium. He coached skiing for 31 years and led the Black Bears to 24 Maine Intercollegiate Athletic Association championships and an apperence in the 1961 NCAA skiing championships. Two of his siikers, Charlie Akers and Robert W. Pidacks, competed in the Olympics. Curtis retired from coaching in 1961. He was inducted into the University of Maine Sports Hall of Fame in 1986.

== Politics ==
Curtis retired from Maine in 1966 and was elected to the Maine Senate that fall. Due to reapportionment, he faced, and was defeated by, a fellow Republican senator, Kenneth P. MacLeod, in the 1968 primary.

== Personal life and death ==
On August 31, 1926, Curtis married Augusta Tolman in Randolph, Massachusetts. They had three daughters and one son, Theodore S. Curtis Jr. Augusta Curtis died on March 3, 1988. Curtis died four months later after a lengthy illness.

== Notes ==
1. One of Curtis' obituaries in the Bangor Daily News states that he died in a Bangor, Maine hospital. Another obituary in the same paper states that he died at home in Orono, Maine.
