= Fred J. Allen =

American politician

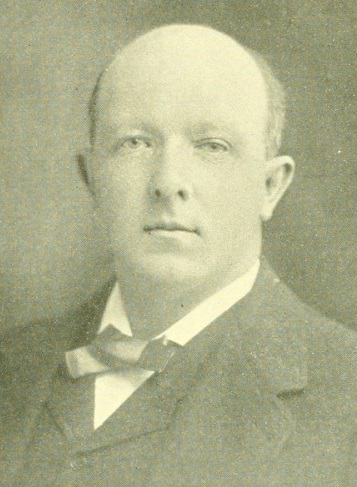
- From 1902's An Album of the Attorneys of Maine

70th President of the Maine Senate
- In office January 2, 1907 – January 6, 1909
- Preceded by: Forrest Goodwin
- Succeeded by: Luere B. Deasy

Member of the Maine Senate from the 1st district
- In office January 4, 1905 – January 6, 1909 Serving with J. B. E. Tartre and J. W. Simpson
- Preceded by: Oliver C. Titcomb
- Succeeded by: George H. Smith
- Constituency: York County

Member of the Maine House of Representatives from Sanford
- In office January 2, 1901 – January 4, 1905
- Preceded by: William Kernon
- Succeeded by: George A. Goodwin

Personal details
- Born: Fred John Allen; July 27, 1865 Alfred, Maine, U.S.
- Died: February 2, 1917 (aged 51) Sanford, Maine, U.S.
- Party: Republican
- Education: Bowdoin College

Fred John Allen (July 27, 1865 – February 2, 1917) was an American politician and lawyer from Maine. Allen, a native of Alfred, Maine and member of the Republican Party, served in the Maine Legislature from 1901 to 1908. Allen served two terms in the Maine House of Representatives from 1901 to 1904. Elected to the Maine Senate in 1904, Allen also was elected Senate President in 1907–1908.

Prior to Allen's time in politics, he attended Bowdoin College and served as superintendent of Sanford public schools.

Allen's brother, Amos L. Allen, spent 12 years in the United States Congress from Maine's 1st congressional district.
