= Levi Hubbard =

American politician (1762–1836)

Member of the U.S. House of Representatives from Massachusetts's 20th district
- In office March 4, 1813 – March 3, 1815
- Preceded by: None
- Succeeded by: Albion Parris

Member of the Massachusetts House of Representatives
- In office 1804, 1805, 1812 – 1813

Member of the Massachusetts Senate
- In office 1806 – 1811, 1816

Personal details
- Born: December 19, 1762 Worcester, Province of Massachusetts Bay, British America
- Died: February 18, 1836 (aged 73) Paris, Maine, U.S.
- Resting place: Family burial plot, Paris, Maine
- Party: Democratic-Republican
- Spouse: Molly
- Children: Oliver Hubbard
- Profession: Farmer

Levi Hubbard (December 19, 1762 – February 18, 1836) was a U.S. representative from Massachusetts. Born in Worcester in the Province of Massachusetts Bay to Jonas Hubbard and Mary (Stevens) Hubbard, he attended the common schools. He moved to Paris in Massachusetts' District of Maine in 1785, where he farmed and served in local offices including selectman and treasurer of Oxford County.

He was prominent in the Massachusetts militia, attained the rank of major general as commander of the 13th Division, and served in the War of 1812. He also served as member of the Massachusetts House of Representatives (1804, 1805, 1812) and the Massachusetts State Senate (1806–1811).

Hubbard was elected as a Democratic-Republican to the Thirteenth Congress (March 4, 1813 – March 3, 1815). After leaving the House, he resumed farming, served in the Massachusetts Senate in 1816, and served as a member of the Executive Council of Maine in 1829.

Hubbard died in Paris, Maine on February 18, 1836. He was interred in a tomb on his farm, and later re-interred at Hillside Cemetery in Paris.

== Sources ==
- United States Congress. "Levi Hubbard (id: H000887)". Biographical Directory of the United States Congress.

U.S. House of Representatives
Preceded by District created	Member of the U.S. House of Representatives from Massachusetts's 20th congressional district March 4, 1813 – March 3, 1815	Succeeded by Albion K. Parris
