= Stephen Chase (politician) =

American politician

Stephen Henry Chase was an American politician from Maine. Chase, a Democrat from Fryeburg, represented Oxford County in the Maine Senate in 1845 and 1846. Chase was Senate President in 1846 when he resigned. He was replaced as Senate President by David Dunn.
