= George E. Bird =

American judge (1847–1926)

George Emerson Bird (September 1, 1847 – January 19, 1926), of Portland, Maine, was a justice of the Maine Supreme Judicial Court from April 13, 1908 to August 29, 1918.

Born in Portland, Maine, Bird attended Portland High School, and received an undergraduate degree from Harvard University in 1869, thereafter read law to be admitted to the bar of Cumberland County, Maine, in 1872.

He was the United States Attorney for the District of Maine from 1885 to 1890, and was a member of the Maine state legislature in 1893 and 1895. He was appointed as an associate justice on April 13, 1908, and served until his resignation on August 28, 1918. He was thereafter appointed as an "active retired justice" in 1923, allowing him to continue assisting with the work of the court.

Bird died in Yarmouth, Maine, at the age of 79.

Political offices
| Preceded by Sewall C. Strout | Justice of the Maine Supreme Judicial Court; 1908–1918 | Succeeded by Luere B. Deasy |
