= Manly B. Townsend =

American politician (1803–1849)

Manly B. Townsend (1803 – 1849), also documented as Manley B. Townsend, was an American politician and lawyer from Maine. Townsend served three single year terms (1844, 1845, 1848) in the Maine Senate. In 1845, he was the President of the Maine Senate.

Townsend was born in Sidney, Maine. He graduated from Waterville College. From 1831 to 1842, he practiced law in Calais, Maine and from 1842 until his death in 1849, he lived in the nearby town of Alexander.
