= John H. Goodenow =

American politician

John Holmes Goodenow (25 September 1833 – 29 July 1906) was an American politician from Maine. Goodenow, a resident of Alfred, Maine, served one term in the Maine House of Representatives (1859) and two terms in the Maine Senate (1861-1862). During both terms in the Maine Senate, Goodenow was elected Senate President. His father, Daniel Goodenow was a Whig politician and two-time Maine Attorney General and Associate Justice of the Maine Supreme Judicial Court.

John Holmes Goodenow eventually became consul-general to the Ottoman Empire in Constantinopole when he was appointed by President Abraham Lincoln. He replaced fellow Maine State Senator Charles Goddard.

Goodenow was a lawyer and graduate of Bowdoin College.
