= Massachusetts's 20th congressional district =

Obsolete district in Massachusetts, US

- Obsolete district
- Created: 1813
- Eliminated: 1820
- Years active: 1813–1821

Massachusetts's 20th congressional district is an obsolete district. During its short tenure of 1813–1821 it was located in the District of Maine, prior to Maine achieving statehood.

== List of members representing the district ==
Representative	Party	Years ↑	Cong ress	Electoral history	District location
District created March 4, 1813
Levi Hubbard (Paris)	Democratic-Republican	March 4, 1813 – March 3, 1815	13th	Elected in 1812. Retired.	1813 – 1821 "7th Eastern district," District of Maine
Albion K. Parris (Paris)	Democratic-Republican	March 4, 1815 – February 3, 1818	14th 15th	Elected in 1814. Re-elected in 1816. Resigned to become a judge of the District Court of Maine.	1813 – 1821 "7th Eastern district," District of Maine
Vacant		February 4, 1818 – November 3, 1818	15th		1813 – 1821 "7th Eastern district," District of Maine
Enoch Lincoln (Paris)	Democratic-Republican	November 4, 1818 – March 3, 1821	15th 16th	Elected to finish Parris's term. Re-elected in 1818. Redistricted to Maine's 7th congressional district.	1813 – 1821 "7th Eastern district," District of Maine
District moved to Maine March 15, 1820
