= Theodore S. Curtis Jr. =

American politician

Theodore Curtis

Member of the Maine House of Representatives
- In office 1971–1975

Member of the Maine Senate
- In office 1975–1978
- Preceded by: Kenneth P. MacLeod
- Constituency: 25th district

Personal details
- Born: September 23, 1940 Bangor, Maine
- Died: April 24, 2015 (aged 74) Bangor, Maine
- Party: Republican
- Education: Bowdoin College (BA); Harvard Law School (JD)

Theodore S. Curtis Jr. (September 23, 1940 – April 24, 2015) was an American politician from Maine. Curtis, a Republican representing Orono, Maine, served in the Maine House of Representatives from 1971 to 1975 and the Maine Senate from 1975 to 1978.

== Early life ==
Curtis was born on September 23, 1940 in Bangor, Maine to Theodore S. Curtis and Augusta Tolman Curtis. Ted Sr. was the longtime ski coach at the University of Maine and served in the Maine Senate from 1967 to 1969. He graduated from Orono High School, Bowdoin College, and Harvard Law School.

== Vietnam War ==
Curtis served in the United States Navy during the Vietnam War (1966–1970). He was an officer aboard the USS Henry W. Tucker and an advisor to the Republic of Vietnam Navy. He was injured in the Gulf of Tonkin. While recovering, Curtis met his future wife, Rose Marie Montero, who was a night nurse at the naval hospital He was awarded the Bronze Star Medal with a "V" device.

== Politics ==
Curtis won his first primary while still serving in Vietnam. He was the first Vietnam Veteran elected to the Maine Legislature. In 1974, he upset Maine Senate president Kenneth P. MacLeod by 72 votes in the Republican primary. He did not seek reelection in 1978.

== Later life ==
Curtis served for many years on the Orono School Committee. He was a trustee of Unity College and the Lee Academy and a director of the University of Maine Pulp & Paper Foundation and the Maine Veterans Homes. Curtis died on April 24, 2015 in Bangor.
