= Harry R. Virgin =

American politician

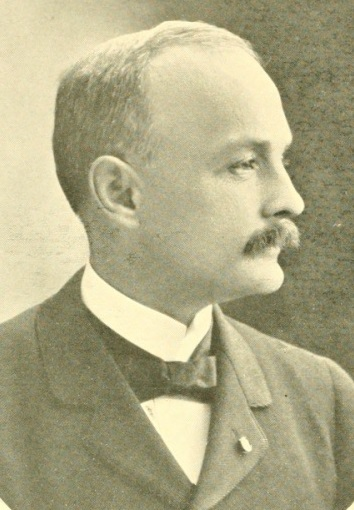
- From 1902's An Album of the Attorneys of Maine

68th President of the Maine Senate
- In office January 7, 1903 – January 4, 1905
- Preceded by: Hannibal E. Hamlin
- Succeeded by: Forrest Goodwin

Member of the Maine Senate from the 2nd district
- In office January 2, 1901 – January 4, 1905
- Preceded by: Josiah H. Drummond Jr.
- Succeeded by: Oakley C. Curtis
- Constituency: Cumberland County

Member of the Maine House of Representatives from Portland
- In office January 4, 1899 – January 2, 1901

Personal details
- Born: Harry Rust Virgin; August 25, 1854 Rumford, Maine, U.S.
- Died: April 11, 1932 (aged 77) Portland, Maine, U.S.
- Party: Republican
- Parent: William Wirt Virgin (father)

Harry Rust Virgin (August 25, 1854 – April 11, 1932) was an American politician and freemason from Maine. Virgin, a Republican, served three terms in the Maine Legislature, including a term as the Maine Senate President. He was the son of Colonel William Wirt Virgin of Rumford and Sarah Hall Cole from Norway, Maine. He lived in Portland, Maine, while serving in the legislature.

== Political career ==
Virgin was first elected to Portland City Council. In 1898, he was elected to the Maine House of Representatives. Two years later, he was elected to the Maine Senate. Following re-election to that body in 1902, he was chosen Senate President for his third and final term. His father also had served as Senate President. William and Henry Virgin are the only father-son duo to both hold that position in Maine history.

== Freemasonry ==
Virgin was heavily involved in Freemasonry, Knights Templar (Freemasonry), and Scottish Rite. He became a master mason at the Ancient Land-Mark Lodge No. 17 in Portland, Maine on January 13, 1888. He served as the Grand Commander of the Grand Commandery of Maine, Knights Templar (Freemasonry), in 1909. He received the 32° as a Scottish Rite mason on January 31, 1889. He served as Commander-in-Chief of the Maine Sovereign Consistory from 1919 to 1922. He was crowned an active member of the Supreme Council, Scottish Rite, Northern Jurisdiction, on September 22, 1921 and served as the Deputy for Maine from 1925 to 1930.
