= Luere B. Deasy =

American judge (1859–1940)

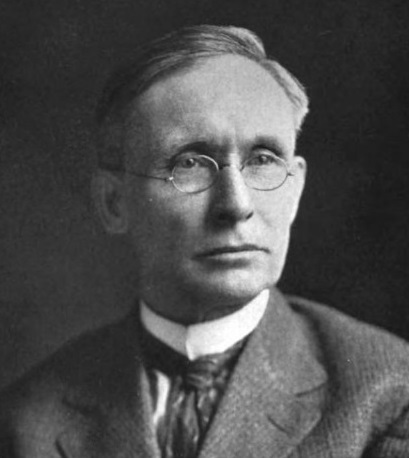
- From Volume 4 (1919) of Maine: A History

14th Chief Justice of the Maine Supreme Judicial Court
- In office October 12, 1929 – February 7, 1930
- Appointed by: William Tudor Gardiner
- Preceded by: Scott Wilson
- Succeeded by: William R. Pattangall

Associate Justice of the Maine Supreme Judicial Court
- In office September 25, 1918 – October 12, 1929
- Appointed by: Carl Milliken; Owen Brewster
- Preceded by: George E. Bird

71st President of the Maine Senate
- In office January 6, 1909 – January 4, 1911
- Preceded by: Fred J. Allen
- Succeeded by: Nathan Clifford

Member of the Maine Senate from the 14th district
- In office January 2, 1907 – January 4, 1911 Serving with: Sumner P. Mills (1907–1909); William A. Walker (1909–1911)
- Preceded by: Edward S. Clark
- Succeeded by: Byron H. Mayo
- Constituency: Hancock County

Personal details
- Born: Luere Babson Deasy; February 8, 1859 Gouldsboro, Maine, U.S.
- Died: March 13, 1940 (aged 81) Portland, Maine, U.S.
- Party: Republican

Luere Babson Deasy (February 8, 1859 – March 13, 1940) was an American lawyer, judge and politician from Maine. Deasy, a Republican from Bar Harbor, served two terms in the Maine Senate (1907–1910), including one as Senate President (1909–1910). He was appointed by Governor Carl Milliken as a justice of the Maine Supreme Judicial Court to a seat vacated by the resignation of George E. Bird, serving thereafter from September 25, 1918, to February 7, 1930.

Deasy was originally from Gouldsboro, Maine and graduated from Eastern State Normal School in Castine, Maine and Boston University School of Law. In religion he was a Unitarian. As a practicing lawyer starting in 1886, Deasy was noted for his persuasiveness.

Political offices
Preceded by George E. Bird	Justice of the Maine Supreme Judicial Court; 1918–1930	Succeeded by William Robinson Pattangall
