= J. Frederick Burns =

American politician

Jeremiah Frederick Burns (11 October 1899 – 13 October 1942) was an American politician from Maine. Burns was born in Washington, D.C. to Canadian-born parents of Irish and English descent, and later moved to Houlton, Maine. He was a Republican who served in the Maine Senate from 1934 to 1940. From 1936 to 1938, Burns was the Senate President.

Burns was a Republican delegate to the 1936 Republican National Convention from Maine's 3rd congressional district.
