= Thomas Marshall (Maine politician) =

American politician

Thomas H. Marshall (1826–1861) was an American politician and military commander from Maine. Marshall, a resident of Belfast, Maine and graduate of Bowdoin College, served two terms in the Maine House of Representatives (1857–1858) and two terms in the Maine Senate (1859–1860). During his final term in the Maine Senate, Marshall was elected Senate President. With the outbreak of the American Civil War, Marshall left elected office and became a major in the 4th Maine Volunteer Infantry Regiment, which assembled in Rockland, Maine in May 1861. Marshall was later transferred to the 7th Maine Volunteer Infantry Regiment, where he was at first a lieutenant colonel and later the commanding officer. He became ill with a fever and died in Baltimore along with 80 others in the 7th Maine Regiment.
