= David Porter Heap =

United States Army general

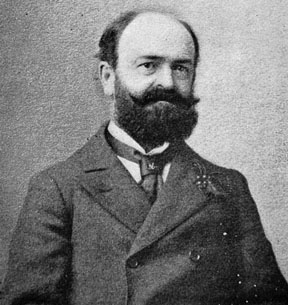
- Born: March 24, 1843; San Stefano, Turkey
- Died: October 25, 1910 (aged 67); Pasadena, California
- Burial place: Arlington National Cemetery, DC
- Military career
- Allegiance: United States of America
- Branch: United States Army
- Service years: 1864-1905
- Rank: Brigadier General
- Unit: United States Army Corps of Engineers
- Conflicts: American Civil War

David Porter Heap (March 24, 1843 – October 25, 1910) was an American engineer, born in San Stefano, Turkey, and educated at Georgetown College, and at West Point, where he graduated in 1864. He served with the Army of the Potomac and was breveted captain on April 2, 1865. Two years later he received his commission as captain in the Corps of Engineers.

Early on he was employed in building fortifications and improving harbors. Later he served with the US Lighthouse Service in various capacities. He was promoted to lieutenant colonel in 1895, and to colonel in 1903. He retired in 1905 as brigadier general, and died in Pasadena, California in 1910.

His publications include:

Engineer Department U.S. Army at the International Exhibition (1876);
The Paris Electrical Exhibition (1881);
History of the Application of the Electric to Lighting the Coasts of France (1883);
Electrical Appliances of the Present Day (1884);
Ancient and Modern Lighthouses (1887);
Patent 543730 for Light Signal (1895).

== Relatives ==
Heap was the grandson of David Porter, who at the time of Heap's birth was the American ambassador to Turkey.
