= Charles Libby =

American politician and lawyer (1844–1915)

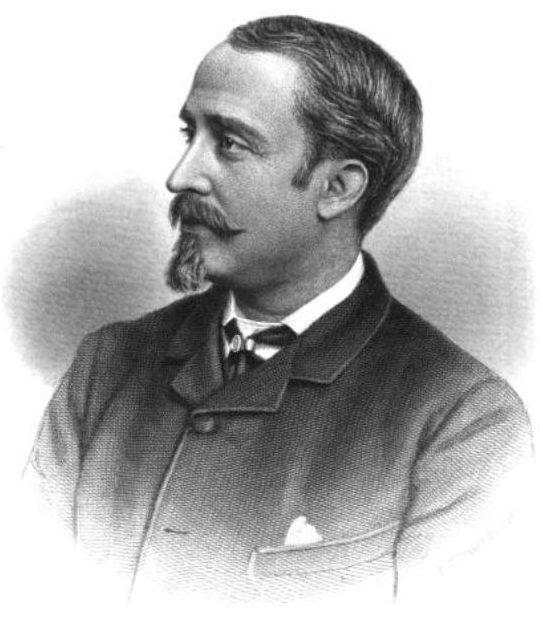

Member of the Maine Senate
- In office 1889–1892

Mayor of Portland, Maine
- In office 1882

Personal details
- Born: Charles Freeman Libby; January 31, 1844 Limerick, Maine
- Died: June 3, 1915 (aged 71) Portland, Maine
- Party: Republican
- Spouse: Alice W. Bradbury (m. 1869)
- Children: 2
- Education: Bowdoin College; Columbia Law School
- Occupation: Lawyer, politician

Charles Freeman Libby (January 31, 1844 – June 3, 1915) was an American politician and lawyer from Maine. Libby, a Republican, served as President of the Maine Senate from 1891 to 1892 and later as President of the American Bar Association.

== Biography ==
Libby was born in Limerick, Maine, and his family moved to Portland a few years later. Libby graduated from Portland High School and Bowdoin College in 1864. He interned with a local law firm and studied at Columbia Law School and was admitted to the bar in 1866. In 1882, he served as Mayor of Portland, Maine, and was elected to the Maine Senate in 1889, serving until 1892.

He married Alice W. Bradbury on December 9, 1869, and they had two children.

Libby died at his home in Portland on June 3, 1915.
