= Daniel Rose (politician) =

American politician (1772–1833)

4th Governor of Maine
- In office January 2, 1822 – January 5, 1822
- Preceded by: Benjamin Ames
- Succeeded by: Albion K. Parris

Member of the Maine Senate
- In office 1820–1824

Personal details
- Born: July 31, 1772 Branford, Colony of Connecticut, British America
- Died: October 25, 1833 (aged 61) Thomaston, Maine, U.S.
- Party: Democratic-Republican Party

Daniel Rose (July 31, 1772 – October 25, 1833) was an American politician and physician from the State of Maine. He was a member of the Democratic-Republican Party, and served as president of the Maine Senate. He briefly served as the fourth governor of Maine from January 2 to January 5, 1822, filling an unexpired term between the administrations of Benjamin Ames and Albion K. Parris.

Rose was born in the Connecticut Colony and graduated from Yale University in 1791. He settled in Alna, Maine and studied and practiced medicine in nearby Boothbay. Rose served as a member of the Maine Senate from its founding in 1820 until 1824. He was the President of the Maine Senate from in 1822 and 1823. Upon finishing his terms in the Maine Senate, Rose was moved to Thomaston, Maine and became the Warden of the Maine State Prison, which he helped design.

He is buried at Elm Grove Cemetery in Thomaston.

Political offices
Preceded by Benjamin Ames	Governor of Maine; 1822	Succeeded by Albion K. Parris
Preceded by William D. Williamson	President of the Maine Senate; 1822-1823	Succeeded by Benjamin Ames
