= List of presidents of the Maine Senate =

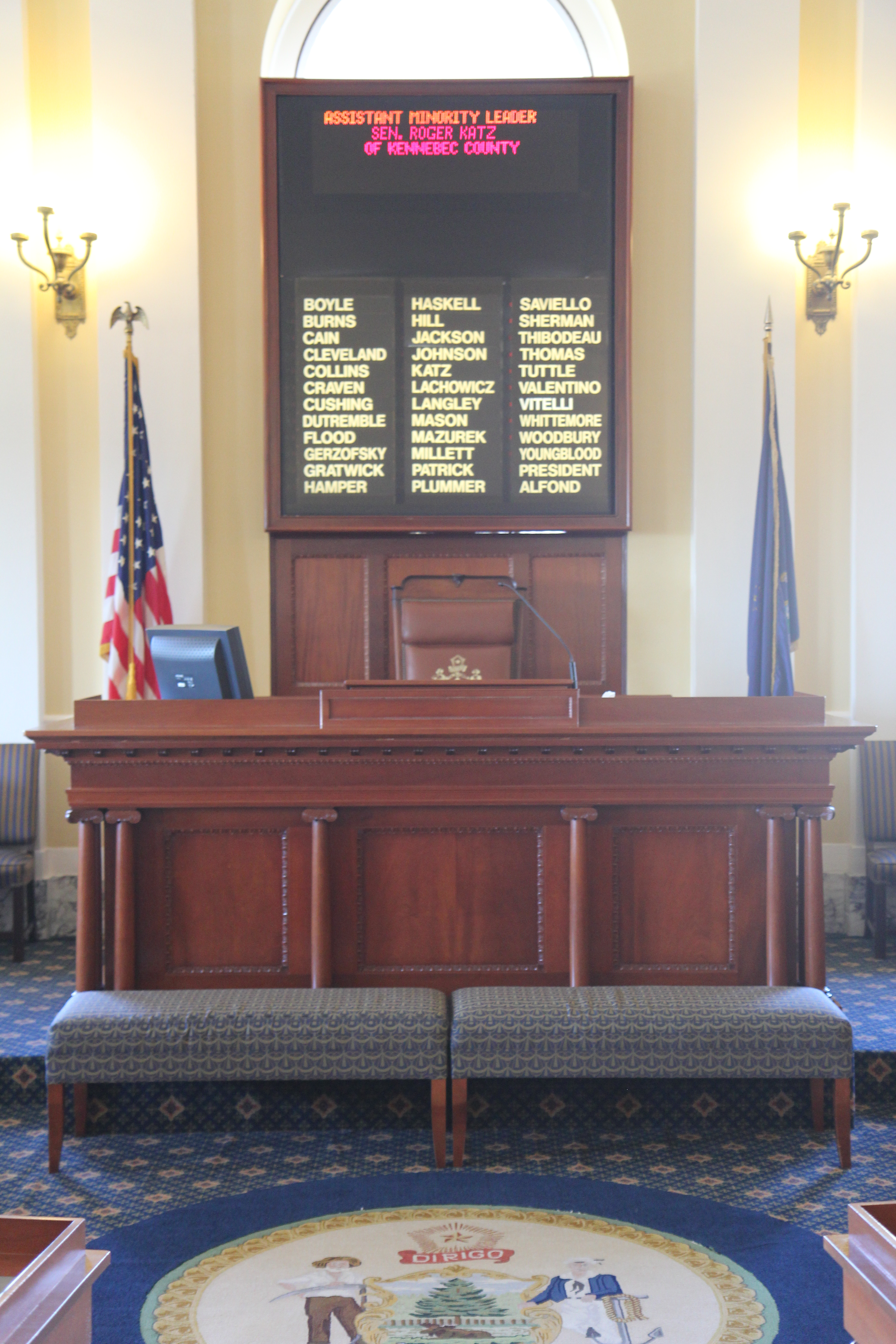
The desk for the president of the Maine Senate in 2014

The position of President of the Maine Senate was created when Maine separated from Massachusetts and achieved statehood in 1820.

The Maine Legislature had one year terms until 1880, when an amendment to the Maine Constitution took effect to provide for two year terms. Joseph A. Locke was the first Senate president to serve a two-year term, starting in 1881. The longest-tenured president of the Senate is currently Charles P. Pray, who served four consecutive two-year terms for eight total years as Senate President between 1984 and 1992.

As Maine has no lieutenant governor, the president of the Senate is first in line to become Governor of Maine in the event of a vacancy.

== List of presidents of the Maine Senate ==
| Name | Image | Took office | Left office | Party | Hometown |
|---|---|---|---|---|---|
| | John Chandler | 1820 | 1820 | Democratic-Republican | Monmouth |
| | William Moody | 1820 | 1820 | Democratic-Republican | Saco |
| | William D. Williamson | 1820 | 1821 | Democratic-Republican | Bangor |
| | Daniel Rose | 1822 | 1823 | Democratic-Republican | Thomaston |
| | Benjamin Ames | 1824 | 1824 | Democratic-Republican | Bath |
| | Jonas Wheeler | 1825 | 1826 | Democratic-Republican | Camden |
| | Robert P. Dunlap | 1827 | 1828 | Democratic-Republican | Brunswick |
| | Nathan Cutler | 1829 | 1829 | Democratic-Republican | Farmington |
| | Joshua Hall | 1830 | 1830 | Democratic-Republican | Frankfort |
| | Robert P. Dunlap | 1831 | 1831 | Democratic-Republican | Brunswick |
| | F.O.J. Smith | 1832 | 1832 | Democratic | Portland |
| | Joseph Williamson | 1833 | 1834 | Democratic | Belfast |
| | Josiah Pierce | 1835 | 1836 | Democratic | Gorham |
| | John C. Talbot | 1837 | 1837 | Democratic | East Machias |
| | Nathaniel Littlefield | 1838 | 1838 | Democratic | Bridgton |
| | Job Prince | 1839 | 1839 | Democratic | Turner |
| | Stephen C. Foster | 1840 | 1840 | Democratic | Pembroke |
| | Richard H. Vose | 1841 | 1841 | Democratic | Augusta |
| | Samuel Blake | 1842 | 1842 | Democratic | Bangor |
| | Edward Kavanagh | 1843 | 1843 | Democratic | Damariscotta |
| | Virgil D. Parris | 1843 | 1843 | Democratic | Buckfield |
| | John W. Dana | 1844 | 1844 | Democratic | Fryeburg |
| | Manly B. Townsend | 1845 | 1845 | Democratic | Alexander |
| | Stephen Chase | 1846 | 1846 | Democratic | Fryeburg |
| | David Dunn | 1846 | 1846 | Democratic | Poland |
| | John Hodgdon | 1847 | 1847 | Democratic | Houlton |
| | Caleb R. Ayer | 1848 | 1848 | Democratic | Cornish |
| | William Tripp | 1849 | 1849 | Democratic | Wilton |
| | Paulinus Foster | 1850 | 1850 | Democratic | Anson |
| | Noah Prince | 1851 | 1852 | Democratic | Buckfield |
| | Samuel Butman | 1853 | 1853 | Whig | Dixmont |
| | Luther Moore | 1854 | 1854 | Democratic | Limerick |
| | Franklin Muzzy | 1855 | 1855 | Whig | Bangor |
| | Lot M. Morrill | 1856 | 1856 | Republican | Augusta |
| | Joseph H. Williams | 1857 | 1857 | Republican | Augusta |
| | Hiram Chapman | 1857 | 1857 | Republican | Damariscotta |
| | Seth Scamman | 1858 | 1858 | Republican | Saco |
| | Charles Goddard | 1859 | 1859 | Republican | Auburn |
| | Thomas H. Marshall | 1860 | 1860 | Republican | Belfast |
| | John H. Goodenow | 1861 | 1862 | Republican | Alfred |
| | Nathan Farwell | 1863 | 1863 | Republican | Rockland |
| | George Barrows | 1864 | 1864 | Republican | Fryeburg |
| | David Dinsmore Stewart | 1865 | 1865 | Republican | St. Albans |
| | William Wirt Virgin | 1866 | 1866 | Republican | Norway |
| | Nathaniel A. Burpee | 1867 | 1867 | Republican | Rockland |
| | Josiah Crosby | 1868 | 1868 | Republican | Dexter |
| | Stephen Lindsey | 1869 | 1869 | Republican | Norridgewock |
| | William W. Bolster | 1870 | 1870 | Republican | Dixfield |
| | Charles Buffum | 1871 | 1871 | Republican | Orono |
| | Reuben Foster | 1872 | 1872 | Republican | Waterville |
| | John B. Foster | 1873 | 1873 | Republican | Bangor |
| | John E. Butler | 1874 | 1874 | Republican | Biddeford |
| | Edmund F. Webb | 1875 | 1875 | Republican | Waterville |
| | Thomas W. Hyde | 1876 | 1877 | Republican | Bath |
| | Warren H. Vinton | 1878 | 1878 | Republican | Gray |
| | J. Manchester Haynes | 1879 | 1879 | Republican | Augusta |
| | Joseph A. Locke | 1880 | 1882 | Republican | Portland |
| | John L. Cutler | 1883 | 1884 | Republican | Bangor |
| | William D. Pennell | 1885 | 1886 | Republican | Lewiston |
| | Sebastian Marble | 1887 | 1888 | Republican | Waldoboro |
| | Henry Lord | 1889 | 1890 | Republican | Bangor |
| | Charles Libby | 1891 | 1892 | Republican | Portland |
| | Albert Spear | 1893 | 1894 | Republican | Gardiner |
| | George M. Seiders | 1895 | 1896 | Republican | Portland |
| | Albert R. Day | 1897 | 1898 | Republican | Corinna |
| | Oliver B. Clason | 1899 | 1900 | Republican | Gardiner |
| | Hannibal E. Hamlin | 1901 | 1902 | Republican | Ellsworth |
| | Harry R. Virgin | 1903 | 1904 | Republican | Portland |
| | Forrest Goodwin | 1905 | 1906 | Republican | Skowhegan |
| | Fred J. Allen | 1907 | 1908 | Republican | Sanford |
| | Luere B. Deasy | 1909 | 1910 | Republican | Bar Harbor |
| | Nathan Clifford | 1911 | 1912 | Democratic | Cape Elizabeth |
| | Carl E. Milliken | 1913 | 1914 | Republican | Island Falls |
| | Ira G. Hersey | 1915 | 1916 | Republican | Houlton |
| | Taber D. Bailey | 1917 | 1918 | Republican | Bangor |
| | Leon F. Higgins | 1919 | 1920 | Republican | Brewer |
| | Percival Baxter | 1921 | 1921 | Republican | Portland |
| | Charles E. Gurney | 1921 | 1922 | Republican | Portland |
| | Frank G. Farrington | 1923 | 1924 | Republican | Augusta |
| | Hodgdon C. Buzzell | 1925 | 1926 | Republican | Belfast |
| | Frank H. Holley | 1927 | 1928 | Republican | North Anson |
| | J. Blaine Morrison | 1929 | 1930 | Republican | Phillips |
| | Burleigh Martin | 1931 | 1932 | Republican | Augusta |
| | Harold H. Murchie | 1933 | 1934 | Republican | Calais |
| | Harold E. Weeks | 1935 | 1936 | Republican | Fairfield |
| | Frederick J. Burns | 1937 | 1938 | Republican | Houlton |
| | Sumner Sewall | 1939 | 1940 | Republican | Bath |
| | Nathaniel Tompkins | 1941 | 1942 | Republican | Houlton |
| | Francis H. Friend | 1942 | 1942 | Republican | Skowhegan |
| | Horace A. Hildreth | 1942 | 1944 | Republican | Cumberland |
| | George D. Varney | 1944 | 1948 | Republican | Kittery |
| | Burton M. Cross | 1948 | 1952 | Republican | Augusta |
| | Nathaniel M. Haskell | 1953 | 1954 | Republican | Portland |
| | John F. Ward | 1954 | 1954 | Republican | Millinocket |
| | Robert Haskell | 1954 | 1958 | Republican | Bangor |
| | John H. Reed | 1958 | 1960 | Republican | Fort Fairfield |
| | Earle M. Hillman | 1960 | 1962 | Republican | Bangor |
| | Robert A. Marden | 1962 | 1964 | Republican | Waterville |
| | Carlton Day Reed, Jr. | 1964 | 1966 | Democratic | Woolwich |
| | Joseph Campbell | 1966 | 1968 | Republican | Augusta |
| | Kenneth P. MacLeod | 1968 | 1974 | Republican | Brewer |
| | Joseph Sewall | 1974 | 1982 | Republican | Old Town |
| | Gerard Conley | 1982 | 1984 | Democratic | Portland |
| | Charles P. Pray | 1984 | 1992 | Democratic | Millinocket |
| | Dennis L. Dutremble | 1992 | 1994 | Democratic | Biddeford |
| | Jeffrey Butland | 1994 | 1996 | Republican | Cumberland |
| | Mark Lawrence | 1996 | 2000 | Democratic | Kittery |
| | Mike Michaud | 2000 | 2001 | Democratic | East Millinocket |
| | Rick Bennett | 2001 | 2002 | Republican | Norway |
| | Beverly Daggett | 2002 | 2004 | Democratic | Augusta |
| | Beth Edmonds | 2004 | 2008 | Democratic | Freeport |
| | Libby Mitchell | 2008 | 2010 | Democratic | Vassalboro |
| | Kevin Raye | 2010 | 2012 | Republican | Perry |
| | Justin Alfond | 2012 | 2014 | Democratic | Portland |
| | Michael Thibodeau | 2014 | 2018 | Republican | Winterport |
| | Troy Jackson | 2018 | 2024 | Democratic | Allagash |
| | Mattie Daughtry | 2024 | - | Democratic | Brunswick |

== See also ==
- List of Maine state legislatures
