= Seth Scamman =

American politician

Seth Scamman (also spelled Scammon) (1811–1894) was an American farmer, educator and politician from Maine. Scamman, a Republican, was elected to the Maine House of Representatives in 1855 and re-elected a year later. In 1857, Scamman was elected to the Maine Senate. Re-elected in 1858, Scamman was chosen by his peers to be Senate President.

Scamman was born into one of Saco, Maine's most prominent families. Beyond being involved in politics, Scamman was a farmer and schoolteacher. During the American Civil War, he served as Superintendent of the State Reform School for Boys.
