= Hiram Chapman =

American politician

Hiram Chapman (died 1864) was an American politician from Maine. Chapman, a Democrat from Damariscotta, Maine, was elected to eight single year terms in the Maine Legislature, including four in the Maine House of Representatives and four in the Maine Senate. Chapman was Senate President in 1857.

In 1863, he was elected Land Agent for the state, which office he held until his death the following year, which was marked by a resolution in the state senate.
