= Nathan Clifford (Maine politician) =

American politician

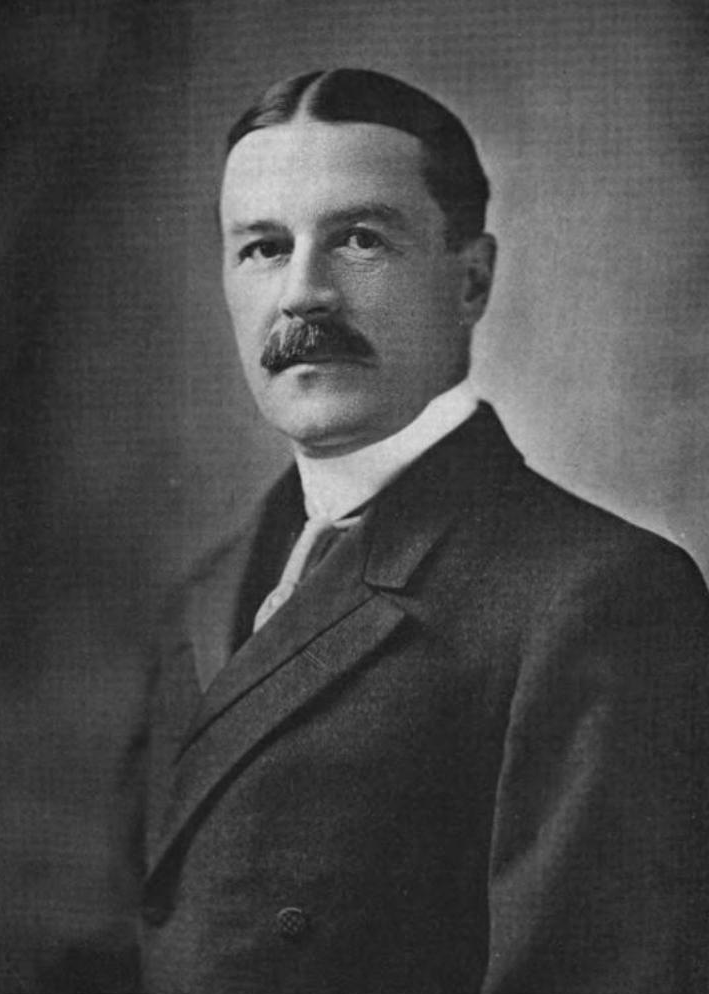

72nd President of the Maine Senate
- In office January 4, 1911 – January 2, 1913
- Preceded by: Luere B. Deasy
- Succeeded by: Carl Milliken

Member of the Maine Senate from the 2nd district
- In office January 4, 1911 – January 2, 1913 Serving with Howard Winslow, Henry M. Moulton, and Ira C. Foss
- Constituency: Cumberland County

Personal details
- Born: June 17, 1867 Portland, Maine, U.S.
- Died: November 6, 1919 (aged 52) Cape Elizabeth, Maine, U.S.
- Party: Democratic
- Spouse: Caroline Devens (m. 1897)
- Education: Harvard College (AB)

Nathan Clifford (June 17, 1867 – November 6, 1919) was an American lawyer, businessman and politician from Portland, Maine. Clifford, a Democrat, served as Mayor of Portland from 1906 to 1907 after defeating incumbent James Phinney Baxter. He later was elected President of the Maine Senate in 1911. He was the only Democrat to hold that office from Luther Moore in 1854 and Carlton Day Reed Jr. in 1964.

== Biography ==
Nathan Clifford was born in Portland on June 17, 1867. He grew up in Portland before graduating from Harvard College in 1890. After studying the law under his father, he was admitted to the Maine bar in 1893. He married Caroline Devens in Boston in May 1897.

His grandfather, who was also named Nathan Clifford, was an Associate Justice of the Supreme Court of the United States from 1858 to 1881. His father, William Henry Clifford, was a successful attorney. Clifford studied law with his father and the two were eventually partners in the law firm Clifford, Verrill, and Clifford.

He died from heart disease at his former summer cottage turned retirement home in Cape Elizabeth, Maine on November 6, 1919. He is buried at Evergreen Cemetery.
