= Benjamin Ames =

American politician (1778–1835)

3rd Governor of Maine
- In office December 5, 1821 – January 2, 1822
- Preceded by: William D. Williamson
- Succeeded by: Daniel Rose

Personal details
- Born: October 30, 1778 Andover, Massachusetts, US
- Died: September 28, 1835 (aged 56) Houlton, Maine, US
- Party: Democratic-Republican Party
- Education: Harvard University

Benjamin Ames (October 30, 1778 – September 28, 1835) was the third governor of Maine, who served from December 5, 1821, to January 2, 1822.

== Biography ==
Ames was born in Andover, Massachusetts. He graduated Harvard University in 1803, studied law with Samuel Dana, and attained admission to the bar in 1806. He then relocated to Bath, Maine, where he established a practice. Beginning in 1811 he practiced with his brother in law Abel Boynton.

Ames served as County Attorney for Lincoln County from 1807 to 1811, and Judge of Common Pleas Court until 1814. During the War of 1812, Ames was commissioned as a major and commanded a cavalry battalion in the Maine Militia.

From 1818 to 1828 he served as a member of Bowdoin College's Board of Overseers. In 1819 he was a delegate to the constitutional convention that led to Maine's separation from Massachusetts and statehood.

In 1820, Ames was also elected to the Maine House of Representatives, and he was selected as that body's first Speaker. Upon the resignation of William D. Williamson in December 1821, Ames served as governor until Daniel Rose took office in January 1822.

Ames was elected to the Maine Senate in 1824, and served as its fifth President. With the elections of 1827, he returned to the state House of Representatives.

In 1827, Ames became involved in a dispute with former Governor William King over who would be appointed as the federal Collector of Customs for the Port of Bath; the dispute became personal, with each accusing the other of violating the national trade embargo with England to supply the British Army in Canada during the War of 1812. King received the appointment, and served from 1829 to 1834.

The prolonged dispute with King caused Ames to lose legal clients; his law practice failed, and he moved to Cincinnati, Ohio. In 1829, he decided to return to Maine; while in Providence, Rhode Island, Ames suffered a debilitating stroke. He never fully recovered, and he died at the Houlton, Maine home of his brother in law Benjamin A. Boynton on September 28, 1835. He was buried at Soldiers Cemetery in Houlton.

== Family ==
In 1809, Ames married Mary Boynton of Westford, Massachusetts. She died in 1810, and they had no children. In 1812, he married Sarah "Sally" Boynton, the sister of his first wife. They were the parents of three children, son George, and two daughters.

Political offices
Preceded by William D. Williamson	3rd Governor of Maine; 1821-1822	Succeeded by Daniel Rose
