= Earle M. Hillman =

American politician

Member of the Maine Senate
- In office 1954–1962

Personal details
- Born: 1902
- Died: May 1, 1975 (age 73)
- Party: Republican

Earle M. Hillman (1902 – May 1, 1975) was an American politician from Maine. Hillman, a Republican, served in the Maine Senate from 1954 to 1962 representing Penobscot County, Maine, including his residence in Bangor, Maine. In 1960, he was elected Senate President for a special session. Following re-election in 1960, Hillman was named Senate President once more, this time for a full two-year term.

In 1960, Hillman broke a tie on whether to allow public funds to support parochial schools, a major issue for the Roman Catholic Church.
