= Kenneth P. MacLeod =

American politician

Kenneth Parker MacLeod

Member of the Maine Senate from the 26th district
- In office 1966–1974
- Succeeded by: Theodore S. Curtis Jr.

Personal details
- Born: February 14, 1923 Skowhegan, Maine, U.S.
- Died: October 23, 2001 (aged 78) Bangor, Maine, U.S.
- Party: Republican
- Education: University of Maine

Kenneth Parker MacLeod Sr. (February 14, 1923 - October 23, 2001) was an American politician from Maine. A Republican, MacLeod served one term (1962-1964) in the Maine House of Representatives and 4 terms (1966-1974) in Maine Senate, including 3 terms as President of the Maine Senate. Growing up in Brewer, Maine, MacLeod represented his district in the Maine Legislature. In 1964, he ran for U.S. Congress as the Republican nominee and lost. He was defeated for reelection by Theodore S. Curtis Jr..

MacLeod graduated from the University of Maine in 1940 and was a decorated fighter pilot in the United States Air Force during World War II.
