= Joseph Williamson (Maine politician) =

American politician (1789–1854)

Member of the Maine Senate from the Belfast district
- In office 1832–1834

Personal details
- Born: August 5, 1789 Canterbury, Connecticut
- Died: September 30, 1854 (aged 65) Belfast, Maine
- Party: Democrat / Whig
- Profession: Lawyer

Joseph Williamson (August 5, 1789 – September 30, 1854) was an American politician and lawyer. He served as President of the Maine Senate in 1833. During his career, Williamson also worked as a businessman, banker and newspaper editor.

== Biography ==
Williamson was born in Canterbury, Connecticut in 1789 as the son of an American Revolutionary War veteran. His older brother, William D. Williamson, later became Maine's second governor in 1821. He was one of eight children. He attended the University of Vermont, graduating in 1812. He passed the bar exam in 1816 and followed his older brother into practice in Bangor, Maine. He quickly moved to Belfast and set up his own practice. Upon the admission of Maine as a state in 1820, he was appointed County Attorney for Hancock County. He held that position until his appointment as County Attorney for Waldo County in 1827. He lasted as Attorney for Waldo County until 1832, when he was elected to the Maine State Senate as a Democrat. He served as the Senate President in 1833-1834. In 1839, he ran for the US Congress as a Democrat, but quickly resigned from the Democratic Party and enrolled as a Whig. He died of an apparent heart attack in September 1854 in Belfast.

== Family ==
Williamson's great grandson, Robert B. Williamson, served as a justice in the Maine Supreme Judicial Court from 1959 to 1970.
