= Harold E. Weeks =

American politician

Harold E. Weeks (c. 1890 – February 7, 1939) was an American politician from Maine. A Republican from Fairfield, Maine, Weeks served in the Maine Legislature from his election in 1920 until 1936. From 1920 to 1924, Weeks served in the Maine House of Representatives. Elected to the Maine Senate in 1924, Weeks served in the Maine Senate until 1936. During his final term (1935–1936), Weeks was elected Senate President.

Weeks graduated from Bowdoin College in 1910 in the same class as future Speaker of the Maine House of Representatives Franz U. Burkett.

Weeks took his own life at the age of 49, at the Augusta State Hospital, by stabbing himself in the heart with a nail file. Weeks had been diagnosed with manic depressive psychosis the year before.
