= Albion Parris =

American judge and politician (1788–1857)

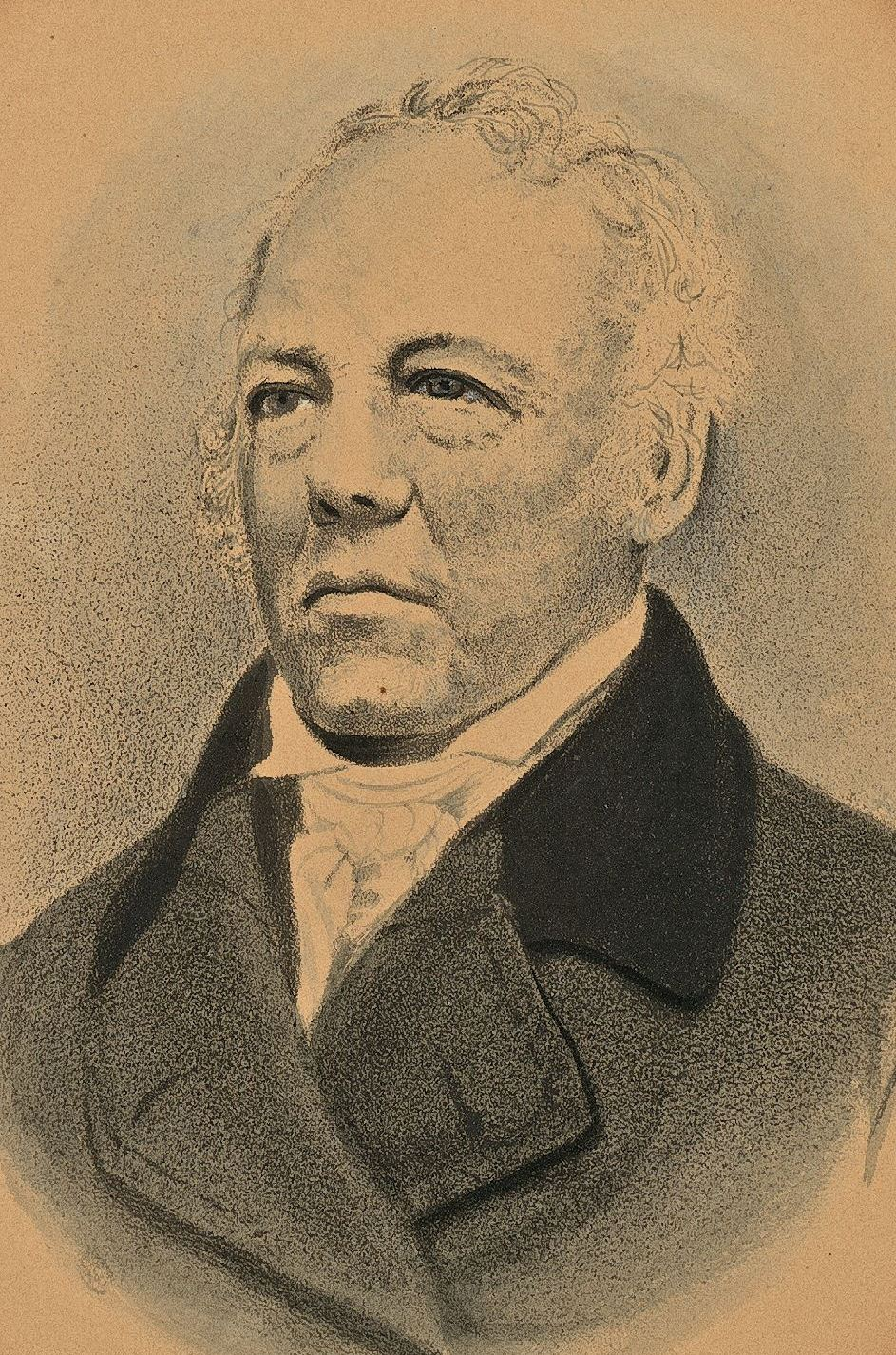

United States Senator from Maine
- In office March 4, 1827 – August 26, 1828
- Preceded by: John Holmes
- Succeeded by: John Holmes

5th Governor of Maine
- In office January 5, 1822 – January 3, 1827
- Preceded by: Daniel Rose
- Succeeded by: Enoch Lincoln

Judge of the United States District Court for the District of Maine
- In office January 28, 1818 – January 1, 1822
- Appointed by: James Monroe
- Preceded by: David Sewall
- Succeeded by: Ashur Ware

Member of the U.S. House of Representatives from Massachusetts's 20th district
- In office March 4, 1815 – February 3, 1818
- Preceded by: Levi Hubbard
- Succeeded by: Enoch Lincoln

Personal details
- Born: Albion Keith Parris; January 19, 1788 Hebron, District of Maine, Massachusetts
- Died: February 11, 1857 (aged 69) Portland, Maine, US
- Resting place: Evergreen Cemetery; Portland, Maine, US
- Party: Democratic-Republican; Democratic
- Relatives: Virgil D. Parris
- Education: Dartmouth College read law

Albion Keith Parris (January 19, 1788 – February 11, 1857) was the fifth governor of Maine, a United States representative from the District of Maine, Massachusetts, a United States senator from Maine, a United States district judge of the United States District Court for the District of Maine, an associate justice of the Maine Supreme Judicial Court and the 2nd Comptroller of the Currency for the United States Department of the Treasury.

== Education and career ==
Born on January 19, 1788, in Hebron, District of Maine (then part of Massachusetts), Parris graduated from Dartmouth College in 1806 and read law in 1809. He was admitted to the bar and entered private practice in Paris, District of Maine from 1810 to 1811. He was prosecutor for Oxford County, District of Maine from 1811 to 1813. He was a member of the Massachusetts House of Representatives from Paris, District of Maine from 1813 to 1814. He was a member of the Massachusetts Senate from Oxford and Somerset Counties, District of Maine from 1814 to 1815.

== United States representative ==
Parris was elected as a Democratic-Republican from Massachusetts's 20th congressional district (representing the District of Maine) to the United States House of Representatives of the 14th and 15th United States Congresses and served from March 4, 1815, to February 3, 1818, when he resigned to accept a federal judicial position. He was a delegate to the Maine constitutional convention in 1819.

== Federal judicial service and gubernatorial service ==
Parris was nominated by President James Monroe on January 27, 1818, to a seat on the United States District Court for the District of Maine vacated by Judge David Sewall. He was confirmed by the United States Senate on January 28, 1818, and received his commission the same day. His service terminated on January 1, 1822, due to his resignation. Concurrently with his federal judicial service, he was a Judge of the Cumberland County Probate Court from 1820 to 1821. During his judicial service, the District of Maine was admitted to the Union as the State of Maine on March 15, 1820. He was the 5th Governor of Maine from 1822 to 1827.

== United States senator ==
Parris was elected to the United States Senate from Maine and served from March 4, 1827, to August 26, 1828, when he resigned.

== Later career ==
Parris was an associate justice of the Maine Supreme Judicial Court from 1828 to 1836. He was the 2nd Comptroller of the Currency for the United States Department of the Treasury from 1836 to 1850. He resumed private practice in Portland, Maine from 1849 to 1852. He was the Mayor of Portland in 1852. He was an unsuccessful Democratic candidate for Governor of Maine in 1854, losing to Know Nothing candidate Anson Morrill. He died on February 11, 1857, in Portland. He was interred in Evergreen Cemetery in Portland.

Parris Street in Portland is now named for him.

=== Special service ===
In the fall of 1846, Parris served as one of the three commissioners negotiating a treaty at Washington, D.C., with the Winnebago (Ho-Chunk) Indians.

== Family ==
Parris was the cousin of Virgil D. Parris, a United States representative from Maine.

== Sources ==
- United States Congress. "Albion Parris (id: P000079)". Biographical Directory of the United States Congress.
- Albion Keith Parris at the Biographical Directory of Federal Judges, a publication of the Federal Judicial Center.

Party political offices
Preceded by Albert Pillsbury	Democratic nominee for Governor of Maine; 1854	Succeeded by Samuel Wells
U.S. House of Representatives
Preceded by Levi Hubbard	Member of the U.S. House of Representatives from Massachusetts's 20th congressional district (District of Maine); 1815–1818	Succeeded by Enoch Lincoln
Legal offices
Preceded by David Sewall	Judge of the United States District Court for the District of Maine; 1818–1822	Succeeded by Ashur Ware
Political offices
Preceded by Daniel Rose	5th Governor of Maine; 1822–1827	Succeeded by Enoch Lincoln
Preceded by Neal Dow	Mayor of Portland, Maine; 1852	Succeeded by J. B. Cahoon
U.S. Senate
Preceded by John Holmes	U.S. senator (Class 1) from Maine; 1827–1828; Served alongside: John Chandler	Succeeded by John Holmes
