= William D. Williamson =

American politician (1779–1846)

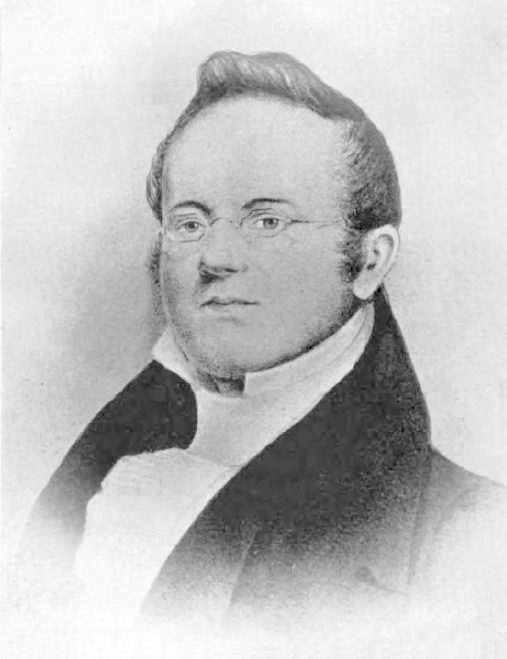

2nd Governor of Maine
- In office May 28, 1821 – December 5, 1821
- Preceded by: William King
- Succeeded by: Benjamin Ames

Member of the U.S. House of Representatives from Maine's 4th district
- In office March 4, 1821 – March 3, 1823
- Preceded by: District created
- Succeeded by: Joshua Cushman

Member of the Massachusetts Senate
- In office 1807–1811; 1816–1820

Personal details
- Born: July 31, 1779 Canterbury, Connecticut, U.S.
- Died: May 27, 1846 (aged 66) Bangor, Maine, U.S.
- Party: Democratic-Republican
- Spouses: Jemima Montague (m. 1806; died 1822) Susan E. White (m. 1823; died 1824) Clarissa Emerson Wiggin (m. 1825)
- Relations: Joseph Williamson (brother)
- Parent(s): George Williamson; Mary Foster Williamson
- Education: Deerfield Academy
- Alma mater: Williams College; Brown University

William Durkee Williamson (July 31, 1779 – May 27, 1846) was the second governor of Maine, and one of the first representatives from Maine in the United States House of Representatives. He was a member of the Democratic-Republican Party. Williamson was also an early historian of Maine.

== Early life ==
Williamson was born on July 31, 1779, in Canterbury, Connecticut, and was named after his father's maternal grandfather and eldest brother, William Durkee. He was the oldest son born to George Williamson, who served in the Army during the Revolutionary War, and Mary (née Foster) Williamson. His younger brother, Joseph Williamson, later served as Senate President.

He completed his preparatory course at Deerfield Academy and graduated from Williams College and Brown University.

== Career ==
Williamson moved to Bangor, then part of Massachusetts, in the first decade of the 19th century and established a law practice there in 1807. He became Bangor's postmaster (among other offices) in 1810. During the War of 1812 he was present at the capture and sacking of Bangor by the British following the Battle of Hampden and, like all male residents of the town, was made to sign an oath declaring he would not take up arms for the remainder of the war.

=== Elected office ===
Following the war, in 1816, Williamson was elected to the Massachusetts State Senate representing the District of Maine, but became a force behind the movement for Maine statehood.

In 1820, Maine separated from Massachusetts to become a state, and Williamson became the third President of the Maine State Senate. In 1821, when the first governor, William King resigned, Williamson automatically succeeded him as he was president of the Senate. Williamson served as governor from May 29, 1821, to December 5, 1821.

That same year he ran for and won a congressional seat in the seventeenth Congress. Williamson resigned as governor to serve in the U.S. House of Representatives, serving until 1823.

=== Later career ===
Williamson returned to his law practice in Bangor, also serving as Judge of Probate for Penobscot County until 1840.

Williamson was one of Maine's first historians, writing a 2-volume History of the State of Maine in the late 1830s. This stood as the standard reference on early Maine history for the rest of the 19th century. He was an original member of the Maine Historical Society.

== Personal life ==
Williamson was married to Jemima Montague at Amherst, Massachusetts, on June 10, 1806. She was the youngest daughter of Josiah and Submit Rice, who had been adopted into the family of her uncle, Gen. Zebina Montague. Before her death in Bangor, Maine, on June 22, 1822, at the age of 36, they were the parents of five children together:

- Caroline J. Williamson, who married Nathaniel Haynes, a lawyer. After his death, she married John Chapman of Boston.
- Harriet H. Williamson (d. 1884), who married Paul R. Hazeltine, a merchant from Belfast, Maine.
- William F. Williamson (d. 1832), who died, aged 18, during his junior year at Bowdoin College.
- Mary C. Williamson, who married Richard W. Shapleigh. After his death, she married Livingston Livingston, a lawyer from New York.
- Frances A. Williamson (d. 1847), who married Mayo Hazeltine of Boston.

On June 3, 1823, he remarried to Susan E. White, the daughter of Judge Phineas White of Putney, Vermont. She died, less than a year after their marriage, on March 9, 1824. Williamson married for the third time in 1825 to Clarissa (née Emerson) Wiggin, the widow of Joseph Wiggin and daughter of Edward and Abigail Emerson of York, Maine.

Williamson died in 1846 in Bangor and was buried at Mount Hope Cemetery.

=== Descendants ===
Through his youngest daughter Frances, he was the grandfather of Frances Clarissa Hazeltine, who married Edward Livingston, a prominent businessman and clubman. He was also the grandfather of Professor Henry W. Haynes of Boston, Mayo W. Hazeltine and Philip Livingston, a graduate of Columbia College.

== Published works ==
- The History of the State of Maine: From Its First Discovery, A.D. 1602, to the Separation, A.D. 1820, Inclusive, Volume 1, by William Durkee Williamson.
- The History of the State of Maine: From Its First Discovery, 1602, to the Separation, A.D. 1820, Inclusive, Volume 2, by William Durkee Williamson.

Political offices
Preceded by William King	Governor of Maine; 1821	Succeeded by Benjamin Ames
Preceded by William Moody	President of the Maine Senate; 1820–1821	Succeeded by Daniel Rose
U.S. House of Representatives
Preceded by None	Member of the U.S. House of Representatives from Maine's 4th congressional district March 4, 1821 – March 3, 1823	Succeeded by Joshua Cushman
