= William Wirt Virgin =

American judge

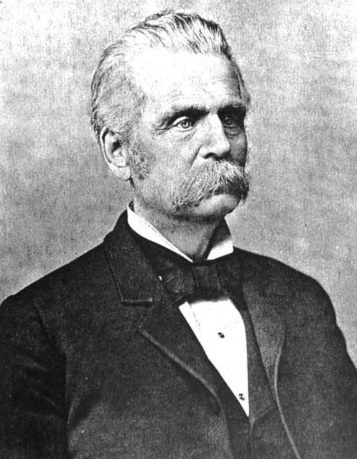
- From 1890's History of Rumford, Oxford County, Maine

Member of the Maine Senate
- In office 1865–1866

Justice of the Maine Supreme Judicial Court
- In office 1872–1893
- Preceded by: Rufus P. Tapley

Personal details
- Born: September 18, 1823 Rumford, Maine
- Died: January 23, 1893 (aged 69)
- Party: Republican
- Education: Bowdoin College

William Wirt Virgin (September 18, 1823 – January 23, 1893) was an American politician and jurist from Maine.

== Early life and education ==
Virgin was born in 1823 in Rumford, Maine and graduated from Bowdoin College in 1844. He was admitted to the Maine bar in 1847 and moved to Norway, Maine, where practiced law until 1871.

== Career ==
During the American Civil War, Virgin raised the 23rd Maine Volunteer Infantry Regiment, which consisted of five companies from Oxford County and Androscoggin Counties. The regiment performed guard and security duties in and around Washington D.C.

Virgin, a Republican, served two one-year terms in the Maine Senate (1865, 1866). In his 2nd and final term, Virgin served as the Senate President. In 1872, Virgin was appointed to the Maine Supreme Judicial Court as an associate justice. He served in that position until his death on January 23, 1893.
