= Albert R. Day =

American educator and politician

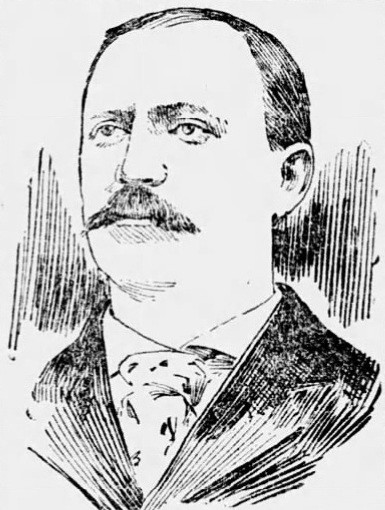
Day in 1897

Albert R. Day (March 2, 1860 – January 21, 1924) was an American educator and politician from Maine. Day, a Republican from Corinna, Penobscot County was Maine Senate President.

Day was a high school teacher and principal, eventually becoming Superintendent of Schools in Corinna. He left that profession in 1887, and in 1893 was elected to the Maine House of Representatives. In 1895, he was elected to the Maine Senate, and was re-elected in 1897, also becoming President of the Maine Senate that year.
