= Charles Goddard (politician) =

American lawyer, politician, and diplomat

Charles William Goddard (December 29, 1825 – 1889) was an American lawyer, politician, and diplomat. Goddard, a Whig turned Republican, served two one-year terms in the Maine Senate (1858, 1859). In his second year, he was chosen Senate President.

Goddard was born in Portland. He graduated from Bowdoin College in 1844, then was admitted to the bar in 1846. He practiced law in Lewiston and Auburn and lived in Auburn while in the State Senate. In 1854, when Androscoggin County was formed from Lincoln and Cumberland counties, Goddard was its first County Attorney.

In 1861, President Abraham Lincoln appointed Goddard as the Consul-General at Constantinople in the Ottoman Empire. He replaced David Porter Heap. In 1864, he returned to the United States and was replaced by Eugene Schuyler.

In 1867 Goddard was a commissioner for the equalization of municipal war debts in Maine, and from 1867 to 1872 he was Justice of the new Superior Court of Cumberland County. From then until 1884 he was postmaster of Portland, and in 1885 he became a Police Commissioner for the city.
