= Charles E. Gurney =

American lawyer and politician

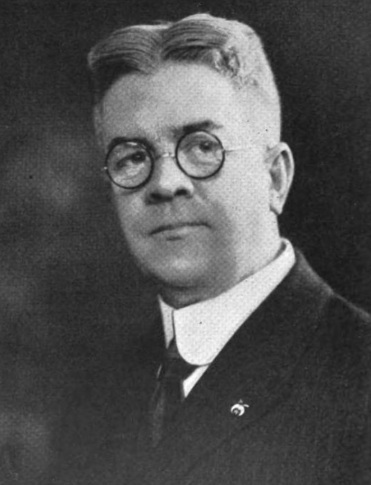
Gurney in 1928

Charles E. Gurney (February 15, 1874 – December 30, 1945) was an American lawyer and politician. Gurney, a Republican from Portland, served a term in the Maine House of Representatives (1917–1918) and two terms in the Maine Senate (1919–1922). He replaced Percival Proctor Baxter when Baxter became governor. During his third and final term in the Senate, he was elected Senate President Pro Tempore following the resignation of Frank G. Farrington on February 7, 1921. After leaving the Senate, Gurney was appointed chair of the Maine Public Utilities Commission and then returned to private law practice.

Gurney graduated from Colby College in 1898 and was admitted to the bar in 1900.
