= Alexander, Maine =

Town in Maine, United States

- Town
- Seal

- Location within the state of Maine Alexander (the United States)
- Coordinates: 45°05′32″N 67°28′03″W
- Country: United States
- State: Maine
- County: Washington

Area
  - Total: 45.65 sq mi (118.23 km^{2})
  - Land: 40.14 sq mi (103.96 km^{2})
  - Water: 5.51 sq mi (14.27 km^{2})
- Elevation: 394 ft (120 m)

Population (2020)
  - Total: 525
  - Density: 13/sq mi (5.1/km^{2})
- Time zone: UTC-5 (Eastern (EST))
  - Summer (DST): UTC-4 (EDT)
- ZIP code: 04694
- Area code: 207
- FIPS code: 23-00660
- GNIS feature ID: 582318
- Website: www.alexandermaine.com

Alexander is a town in Washington County, Maine, United States. The population was 525 at the 2020 census. The town is named for Alexander Baring, 1st Baron Ashburton, the British negotiator of the Webster–Ashburton Treaty which ended the Aroostook War in 1838–1839.

== Geography ==
According to the United States Census Bureau, the town has a total area of 45.65 square miles (118.23 km^{2}), of which 40.14 square miles (103.96 km^{2}) is land and 5.51 square miles (14.27 km^{2}) is water.

== Demographics ==
Historical population
Census	Pop.	Note	%±
1830	336		—
1840	513		52.7%
1850	544		6.0%
1860	445		−18.2%
1870	456		2.5%
1880	439		−3.7%
1890	337		−23.2%
1900	333		−1.2%
1910	374		12.3%
1920	371		−0.8%
1930	312		−15.9%
1940	292		−6.4%
1950	282		−3.4%
1960	220		−22.0%
1970	169		−23.2%
1980	385		127.8%
1990	478		24.2%
2000	514		7.5%
2010	499		−2.9%
2020	525		5.2%
U.S. Decennial Census

=== 2010 census ===
As of the census of 2010, there were 499 people, 223 households, and 156 families living in the town. The population density was 12.4 inhabitants per square mile (4.8/km^{2}). There were 399 housing units at an average density of 9.9 per square mile (3.8/km^{2}). The racial makeup of the town was 98.2% White, 1.0% Native American, and 0.8% from two or more races. Hispanic or Latino of any race were 1.2% of the population.

There were 223 households, of which 25.1% had children under the age of 18 living with them, 56.1% were married couples living together, 9.9% had a female householder with no husband present, 4.0% had a male householder with no wife present, and 30.0% were non-families. 24.2% of all households were made up of individuals, and 6.2% had someone living alone who was 65 years of age or older. The average household size was 2.24 and the average family size was 2.58.

The median age in the town was 49.8 years. 16.6% of residents were under the age of 18; 4.8% were between the ages of 18 and 24; 21% were from 25 to 44; 41.4% were from 45 to 64; and 16% were 65 years of age or older. The gender makeup of the town was 49.9% male and 50.1% female.

=== 2000 census ===
As of the census of 2000, there were 514 people, 196 households, and 150 families living in the town. The population density was 13.0 people per square mile (5.0/km^{2}). There were 359 housing units at an average density of 9.1 per square mile (3.5/km^{2}). The racial makeup of the town was 98.05% White, 0.19% African American, 0.78% Native American, and 0.97% from two or more races. Hispanic or Latino of any race were 0.19% of the population.

There were 196 households, out of which 32.1% had children under the age of 18 living with them, 64.3% were married couples living together, 5.1% had a female householder with no husband present, and 23.0% were non-families. 19.4% of all households were made up of individuals, and 5.6% had someone living alone who was 65 years of age or older. The average household size was 2.62 and the average family size was 2.97.

In the town, the population was spread out, with 24.7% under the age of 18, 6.4% from 18 to 24, 30.9% from 25 to 44, 25.5% from 45 to 64, and 12.5% who were 65 years of age or older. The median age was 38 years. For every 100 females, there were 104.8 males. For every 100 females age 18 and over, there were 110.3 males.

The median income for a household in the town was $29,306, and the median income for a family was $33,125. Males had a median income of $37,500 versus $25,000 for females. The per capita income for the town was $14,943. About 14.6% of families and 20.0% of the population were below the poverty line, including 27.1% of those under age 18 and 10.2% of those age 65 or over.
