= Samuel Howe =

Samuel Howe may refer to:

- Samuel Gridley Howe (1801–1876), American physician, abolitionist and advocate of education for the blind
  - SS Samuel G. Howe, a Liberty ship
- Samuel Lyness Howe (1864–1939), businessman and politician in British Columbia, Canada
- Sam Howe (born 1938), American squash player

== See also ==
- Howe (surname)
