= Laura Richards =

Laura Richards may refer to:

- Laura E. Richards, American writer
- Laura Richards (advocate), British criminal behavioral analyst

== See also ==
- Laura Richards House, Gardiner, Maine
- Laura Richardson, American politician
- Laura Anning Bell, British artist, born Laura Richard
