= Anagnos =

Anagnos is a surname. Notable people with the surname include:

- Bill Anagnos (1958–2019), American stuntman and actor
- Julia R. Anagnos (1844–1886), American poet
- Michael Anagnos (1837–1906), American author, educator, and human rights activist
