= Julia R. Anagnos =

American poet (1844–1886)

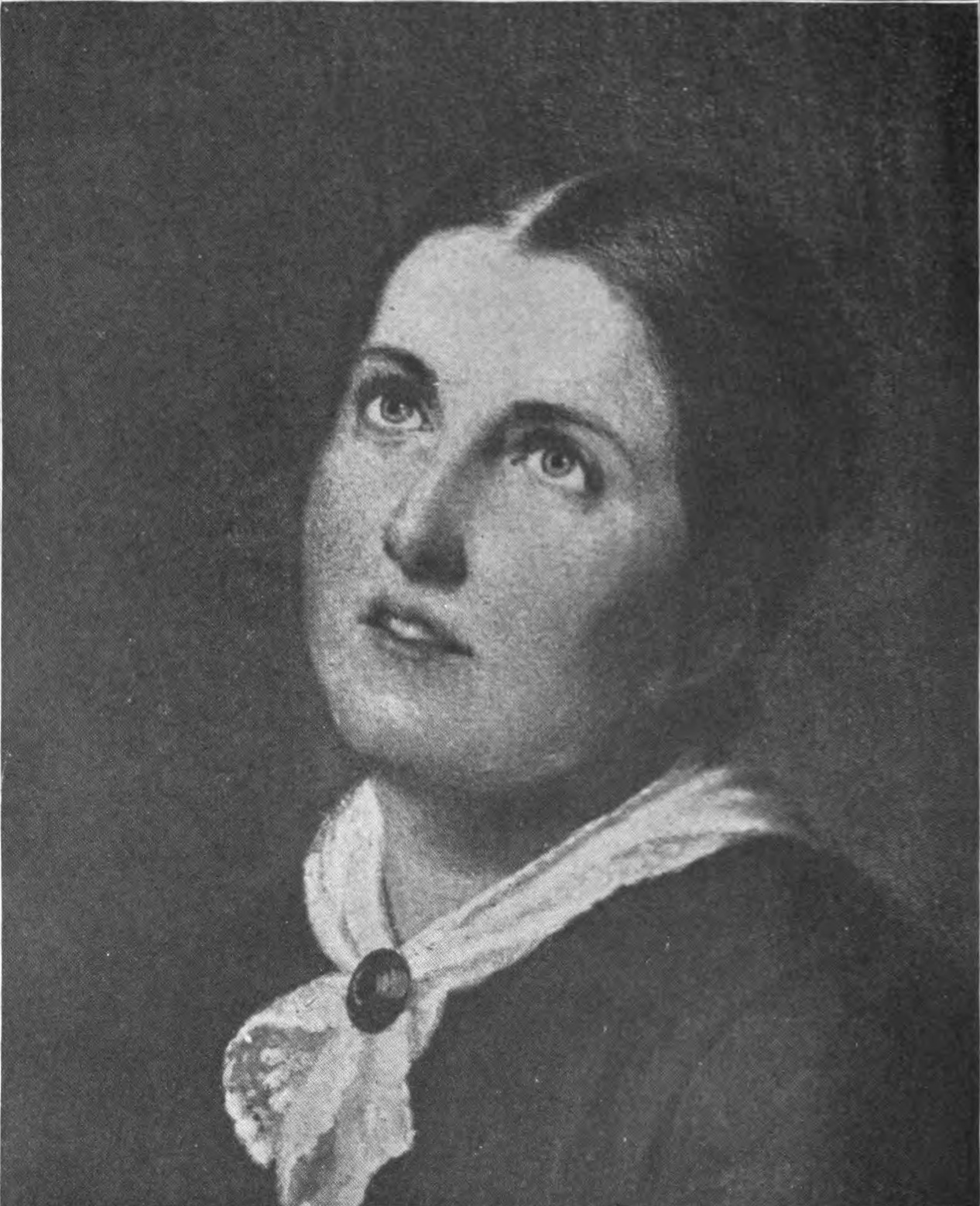
- Julia R. Anagnos, from a 1907 book
- Born: Julia Romana Howe; March 12, 1844; Rome, Papal States
- Died: March 10, 1886 (aged 41); Boston, Massachusetts, U.S.
- Occupations: Poet, educator
- Spouse: Michael Anagnos
- Parent(s): Samuel Gridley Howe; Julia Ward Howe
- Relatives: Maud Howe Elliott, Laura E. Richards, Florence Howe Hall, Henry Marion Howe (siblings)

Julia Romana Howe Anagnos (March 12, 1844 – March 10, 1886) was an American poet, daughter of Samuel Gridley Howe and Julia Ward Howe.

== Early life ==
Julia Romana Howe was born in Rome, Italy, to American parents Samuel Gridley Howe and Julia Ward Howe, on their extended wedding trip in Europe. She was christened in Rome by Theodore Parker, her parents' friend from Boston.

Both of her parents were well-known figures in Boston and beyond; her father was an educator who distinguished himself in the Greek War of Independence, while her mother was a writer and suffragist, and wrote The Battle Hymn of the Republic. Her younger siblings were also noted in their fields, as writer Florence Howe Hall, scientist Henry Marion Howe, writer Laura E. Richards, and writer Maud Howe Elliott. Her uncle was lobbyist Samuel Ward, and her nephew was writer Francis Marion Crawford.

== Career ==
Anagnos worked at her father's school, Perkins School for the Blind, as a teacher. When her husband became the school's director in 1876, she also took on greater responsibilities at the school. Laura Bridgman, her father's deaf-blind student, took particular interest in young Julia, and they formed a lasting friendship.

In 1884, Anagnos was a founder and president of the Boston Metaphysical Club. "She walked in a dream always, of beauty and poetry, thinking of strange things," her sister recalled.

Anagnos published a volume of her poetry Stray Chords (1883), and Philosophiæ quæstor = or, Days in Concord (1885), a book about Bronson Alcott's Concord School of Philosophy. She also translated Brief account of the most celebrated diamonds (1880) from German.

== Personal life ==
She married her tutor, her father's Greek-born assistant Michael Anagnos, in 1870. She died in 1886, aged 41 years, in Boston. Annie Sullivan mentioned Anagnos's recent death in her valedictory address at Perkins in 1886. Anagnos Cottage, at Perkins, is named for Julia R. Anagnos.
