= Robert Hallowell Gardiner =

American land owner

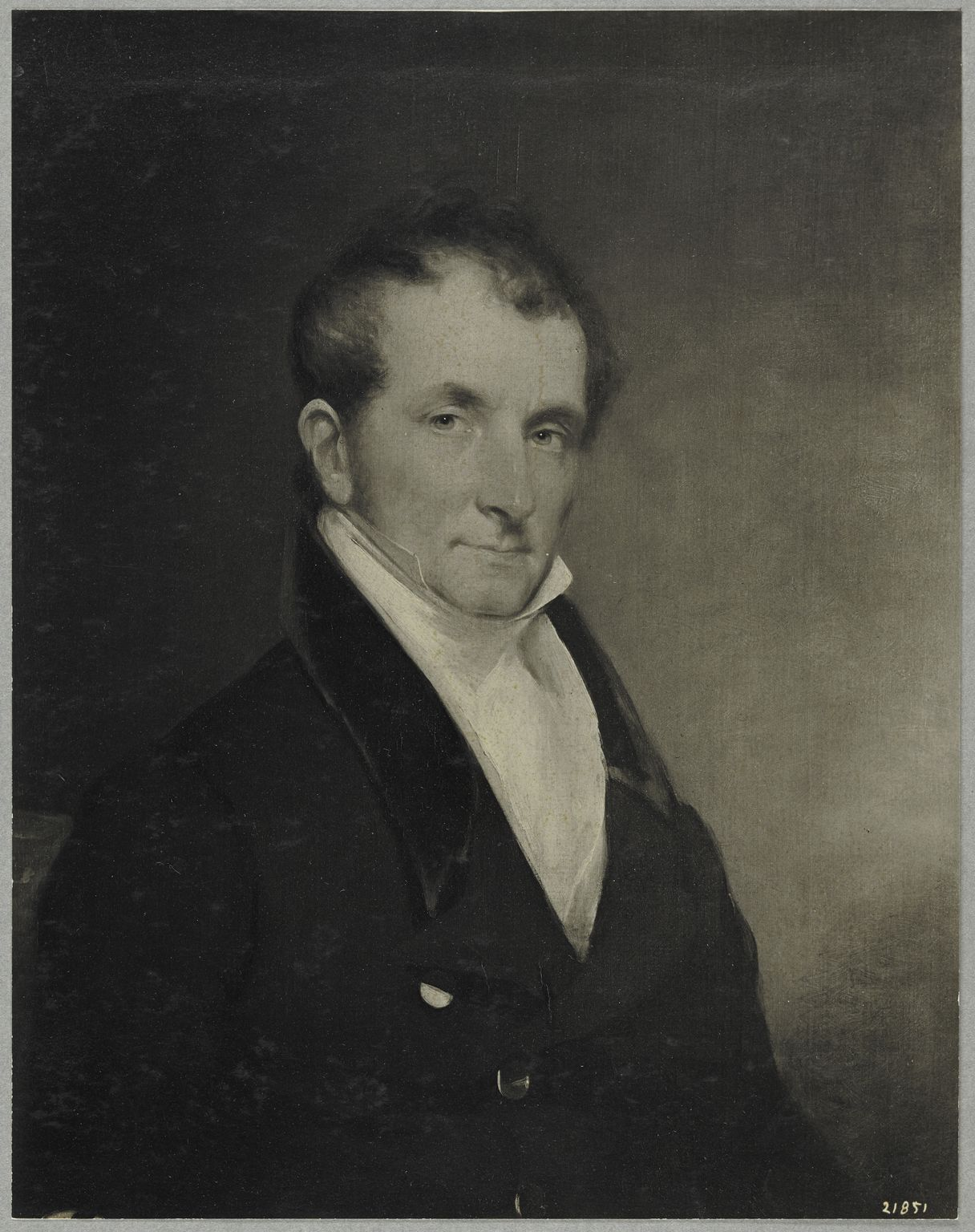
- portrait by Chester Harding
- Born: 10 February 1782; Bristol
- Died: 22 March 1864 (aged 82)
- Education: Harvard University
- Occupation: Politician
- Position held: member of the Massachusetts House of Representatives

Robert Hallowell Gardiner (February 10, 1782 – March 22, 1864) was a prominent, educated land owner in Maine. He represented the union of two great early New England fortunes. He was the grandson of both Dr. Silvester Gardiner, the founder of Gardiner, Maine, and Benjamin Hallowell, the founder of Hallowell, Maine. He was also a trustee for the Gardiner Lyceum school. He was instrumental in the growth of the city of Gardiner.

== Background ==
Robert Hallowell Gardiner was born to loyalist refugees from America in Bristol, England in 1782. He inherited his grandfather's estate in 1787; the previous inheritor had been Gardiner's son William, who had received the estate in 1786 but who died suddenly a year later. Robert Hallowell, who was only five years old at the time, took on the name of Gardiner. He graduated from Harvard College and moved to Kennebec in 1803 to manage the land he had inherited. He came with no inclinations or training in business, but his cousin in Hallowell, Charles Vaughan, and Charle's wife, Frances Western Apthorp, a granddaughter of Charles Apthorp, helped acclimate him to American life. Starting at the age of 25, Robert Hallowell Gardiner embarked on the task of developing an entire city, Gardiner, but with profit and investment in mind over the next sixty-one years.

=== To Gardiner ===
When Robert Hallowell Gardiner moved to Gardiner in 1801, there were about 650 persons there, of whom 60 were squatters. Only two houses stood on Church Hill, and no carriage road led out of town in any direction. A one-mile stretch of dirt road did exist, however, from the river to New Mills.

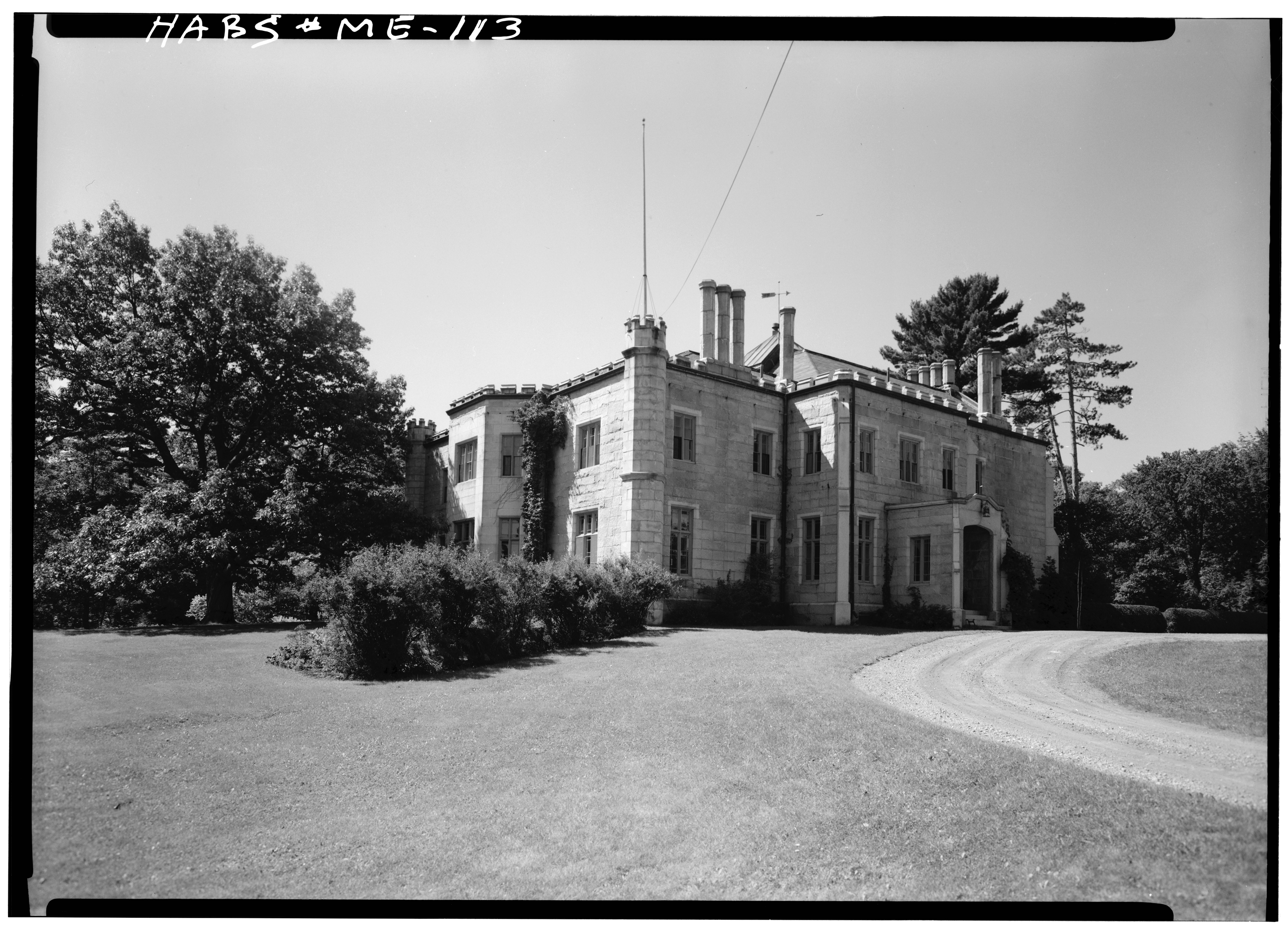
Oaklands designed by Richard Upjohn

The name New Mills originated when the first mill built at the location decayed and was taken down, and was then replaced by a new mill. Today, a bridge near the spot is called the New Mills Bridge. Up until the late 2010’s, a gas station called New Mills Market was there as well

=== Development ===
Gardiner proceeded to repair the dams and mills. He settled property titles with the squatters liberally, and offered generous inducements for manufacturers to settle in the area. Since there were only a few stores in existence then, and many people were obliged to visit a neighboring settlement to trade, Gardiner built additional stores. He also had the land accurately surveyed. He endowed, and laid the cornerstone of, Christ Church; the building is one of the state's most beautiful granite structures.

Gardiner worked to free his land of legal entanglements and squatters, and, in the summer of 1804, he built a church, an inn, a mill, and a wharf in the village, which became known as Gardiner. He was the town's first mayor. He died in 1864.

== Personal life and family ==
He married Emma Jane Tudor, a daughter of William Tudor. His first cousin, John Sylvester John Gardiner was the rector of Trinity Church, Boston (Summer Street). He was a brother-in-law to the "Ice King" Frederic Tudor, credited with establishing the international Ice trade. He was grandfather to Robert Hallowell Gardiner III, Robert Hallowell Richards, and is the great-grandfather of William Tudor Gardiner, the 55th governor of Maine. Gardiner's grandson Henry returned to Gardiner with his wife, Laura E. Richards, to live in what is now the Laura Richards House, a classic example of Federal period architecture.
