= Michael Anagnos =

American author and educator (1837–1906)

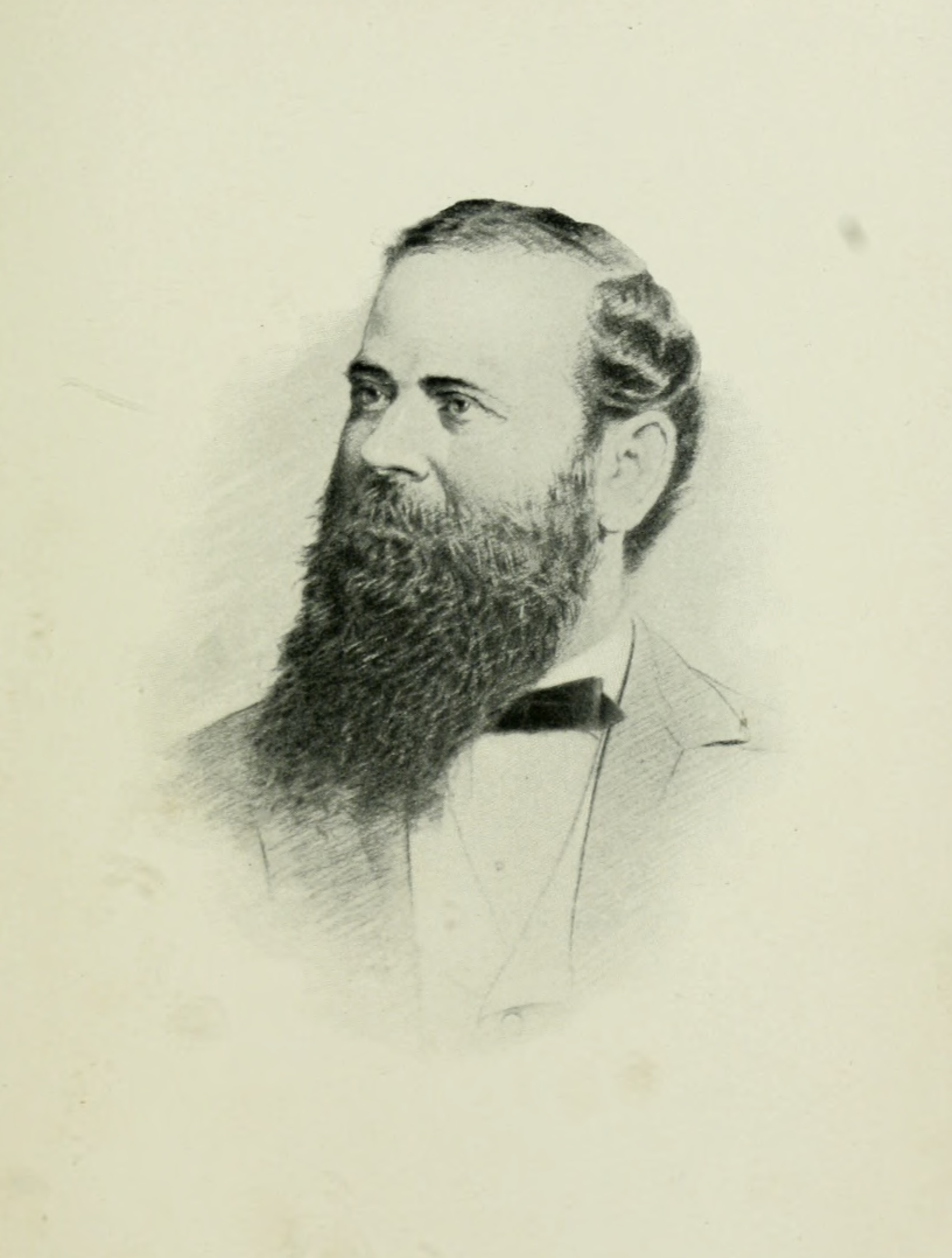
- Born: November 7, 1837; Papingo, Ottoman Empire
- Died: June 29, 1906 (aged 69); Romania
- Resting place: Epiros, Greece
- Occupation: Educator
- Spouse: Julia Romana Howe (m. 1870–1886)

Michael Anagnos (Greek: Μιχαήλ Αναγνωστόπουλος/Ανάγνος; November 7, 1837 – June 29, 1906) was a trustee and later second director of the Perkins School for the Blind. He was an author, educator, and human rights activist. Anagnos is well known for his work with Helen Keller.

== History ==
Michael Anagnos was born Michael Anagnostopoulos on November 7, 1837, in Papingo, a small village in the mountainous area of Epirus, then part of the Ottoman Empire. His father was Demetrios A. Theodore and his mother was Kallina Panayiotes. His father was a farmer and shepherd and placed a high value on educating his son. The region was not disrupted by Ottoman rule and they paid a special tax to the sultan. Ottoman soldiers never came to the village. Anagnos went to high school in Ioannina and attended the National and Kapodistrian University of Athens at age nineteen. Over the next four years, he studied Greek, Latin, French, and philosophy. Anagnos then studied law for three years with the intention of becoming a political scientist and journalist. At age 24, he joined Ethnophylax, a daily Athens newspaper. He later became the editor-in-chief.

Anagnos took an active role in opposition to King Otto and his government, and was active in his dethronement. He introduced Freemasonry to Greece to agitate for dethronement with the aid of Giuseppe Garibaldi and one of his sons. King George succeeded King Otto, and Anagnos left the paper because of a disagreement regarding the revolt of Crete in 1866. Greece was actively at war with the Ottoman Empire from 1821, and American Philhellene and Doctor Samuel Gridley Howe traveled to Greece during the 1860s to offer aid and relief. Doctor Samuel Gridley Howe met Anagnos and hired him as his secretary. Anagnos organized relief for the war effort, and was in charge of the Cretan Committee's affairs in Athens. Doctor Howe had to travel back to the United States, and invited Anagnos to Boston to continue his work with the Cretan Committee in New England around 1868.

Anagnos arrived in the United States at 31 years old. He was a private tutor to the Howe family; Howe also founded the Perkins School for the Blind. Anagnos began to teach Latin and Greek to several blind children. After several years in the United States and with Howe's assistance, Anagnos began to teach Greek at different colleges. He married Howe's daughter, Julia Romana Howe, in December 1870. Anagnos's permanent home became Boston.

Anagnos was Howe's assistant. When Howe was absent Anagnos was Director of the Perkins School for the Blind; he became very familiar with the system of teaching the blind and deaf. He studied the success of Laura Bridgman, a former student of the Perkins School for the Blind. This contributed to his work with Helen Keller, Thomas Stringer, Willie Elizabeth Robin, and other blind and deaf students. Howe died in January 1876; upon his death, Anagnos became the second director of the Perkins School for the Blind.

Anagnos published Education of the Blind in 1882. Around this time, he devised a plan for a kindergarten to teach blind and deaf children. His wife was very educated. By this time she had published several books and assisted and inspired her husband's work with the deaf and blind as well as helping raise money for the kindergarten. However, she suddenly died at 41 in 1886. The couple had no children. Within the next few years, a kindergarten building was erected in Jamaica Plain, Boston, and a large endowment was organized. Anagnos forfeited compensation and labored tirelessly to finish the project. One of the first students was Thomas Stringer. Around this time Anagnos sent former Perkins student Anne Sullivan to teach Helen Keller.

Anagnos traveled to Greece and other parts of Europe for 15 months around 1889. While in Greece he met with Olga, the Queen of Greece. The queen learned about Helen Keller's story, and asked to read every letter she wrote Anagnos. Her interest was so intense that she kept several of the letters, and the nine-year-old deafblind girl was highly regarded in the queen's court. Many U.S. newspapers circulated the story about Helen Keller's popularity within a royal court, which catapulted her legacy. Around age ten Helen Keller wrote "The Frost King" and sent it as a birthday gift to Anagnos. He published the story in The Mentor, the Perkins alumni magazine. The story was then published in The Goodson Gazette, a journal on deaf-blind education based in Virginia. The ensuing controversy regarding the apparent plagiarism involved in the writing of the story - it became known as "The Frost King Incident" - led to a major controversy which spread far beyond the school, and ultimately to Anagnos breaking with both Keller and Sullivan.

Helen Keller later became the first deaf-blind woman to receive a bachelor's degree. Her story became one of the most popular in American history.

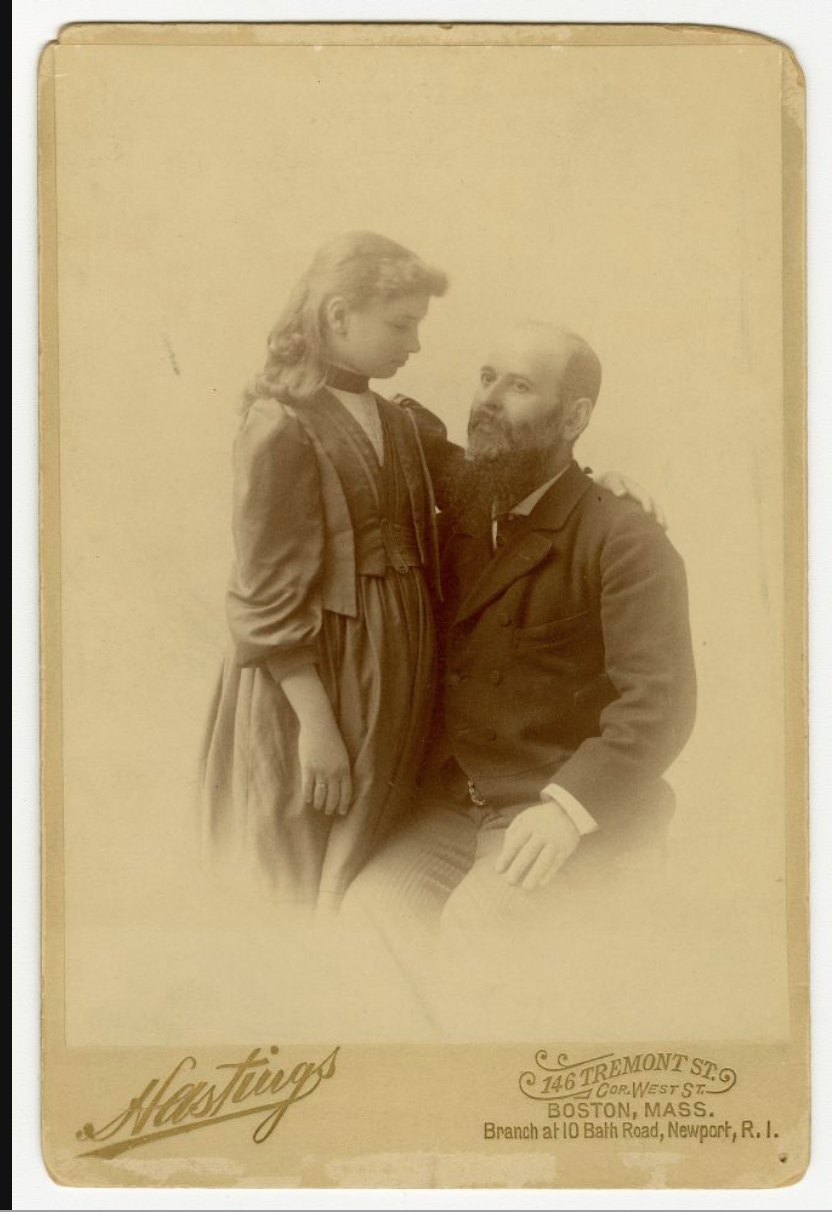
Helen Keller and Michael Anagnos 1891

Anagnos frequently spent time with notable Harvard professor Evangelinos Apostolides Sophocles. In 1892, Anagnos received an honorary A.M. degree from Harvard University. Around 1900, he traveled to Paris to attend the International Congress of Teachers and Friends of the Blind. He was sent to represent both the United States and the Perkins School. He made large financial contributions to Greek education and established schools in Papingo, Greece. He was president and founder of the National Union of Greeks in the United States. He also founded the Plato Society, the Panhellenic Union, and the Alexander the Great Organization. He was vice-president of the Massachusetts Medical Gymnastic Association. Anagnos was instrumental in starting local Orthodox Churches in the Boston area and helping local Greek immigrants.

In 1906, aged 69, he traveled to Athens and observed the Olympic Games. He died on June 29, 1906, while traveling in Romania. His body was taken to Epirus and buried there. In Boston, 2000 people gathered for his memorial service at the Tremont Temple. Notable guests included Governor Curtis Guild Jr., Mayor John F. Fitzgerald, Julia Ward Howe, Episcopal Bishop of Massachusetts William Lawrence, and Florence Howe Hall.

== Literary works ==
- Education of the Blind Historical Sketch of Its Origin, Rise and Progress 1882
- Kindergarten and Primary School for the Blind A Second Appeal for Its Foundation and Endowment 1884
- The Education of the Blind in the United States of America Its Principles, Development and Results; Two Addresses 1904

== Bibliography ==
- Burgess, Thomas (1913). Greeks in America: An Account of Their Coming Progress Customs, Living and Aspirations. Sherman, French & Company 1913.
- Sanborn, Franklin Benjamin (1907). Michael Anagnos, 1837-1906. Boston, MA: Wright and Potter Printing Company.
