= Thomas Stringer =

Thomas Stringer may refer to:

- Thomas Stringer (carpenter) (1886–1945), American deafblind carpenter
- Thomas Stringer (cricketer) (1873–?), English cricketer
- Thomas Walter Stringer (1855–1944), New Zealand judge
- Thomas W. Stringer (1815–1893), American Christian minister and state senator in Mississippi
