= 1917 Pulitzer Prize =

Inaugural award for American journalism and literature

The Pulitzer Prizes were first presented on June 4, 1917. The prizes were given for American journalism and literary works published in 1916. Awards were made in four categories; no winner was chosen in five other categories that had been specified in Joseph Pulitzer's bequest. The winners were selected by the Trustees of Columbia University, on advice from juries of appointed experts.

== Journalism awards ==
A prize of $1,000 was awarded for reporting, and $500 for editorial writing. Because of an insufficient number of candidates, prizes were not issued in the three other journalism categories (public service, newspaper history, and most suggestive paper on development of the Columbia School of Journalism).

- Editorial Writing:
  - New York Tribune, for "The Lusitania Anniversary", an editorial article on the first anniversary of the sinking of Lusitania (no author was named, but the editorial was written by Frank H. Simonds).
- Reporting:
  - Herbert Bayard Swope of the New York World, for his series "Inside the German Empire", published on October 10, October 15 and from November 4 daily to November 22, 1916. The articles were compiled in book form the following year.

== Letters awards ==
A prize of $2,000 was awarded for the best book on American history, and $1,000 for the best American biography. Prizes for the best novel and best drama were not awarded, as the jurors did not find a deserving winner.

- Biography or Autobiography:
  - Laura E. Richards and Maud Howe Elliott assisted by Florence Howe Hall, Julia Ward Howe (Houghton).
- History:
  - Jean Jules Jusserand, With Americans of Past and Present Days (Scribner)
