= Laura E. Richards House =

Historic house in Maine, United States

- Laura Richards House
- Formerly listed on the U.S. National Register of Historic Places
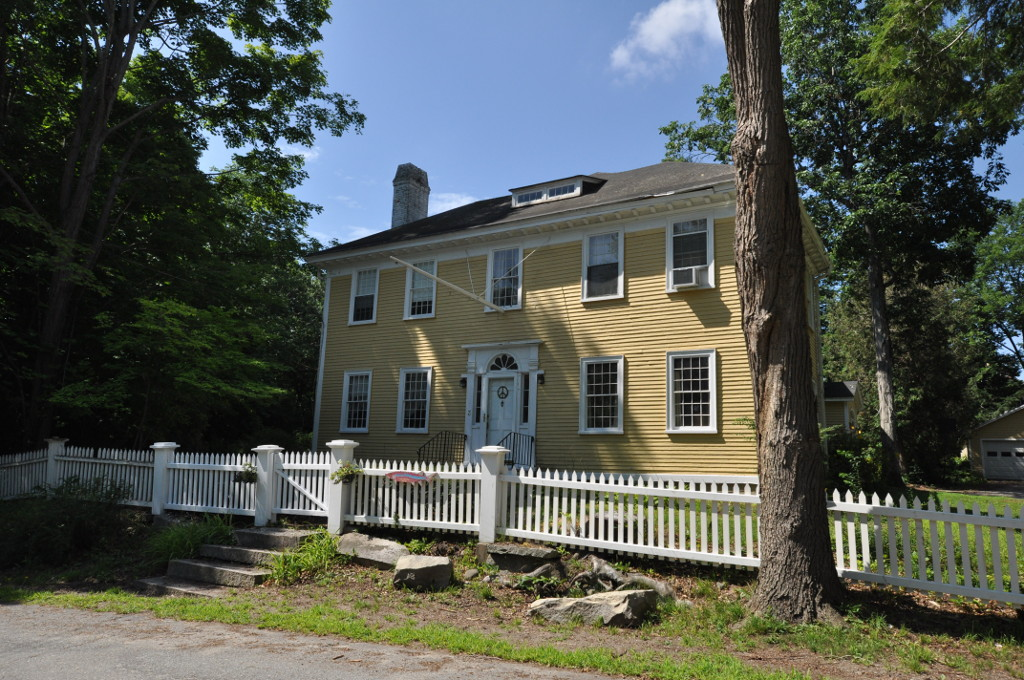

- Location within Maine Location within the United States
- Location: 3 Dennis St., Gardiner, Maine
- Coordinates: 44°13′38″N 69°46′21″W
- Area: 0.5 acres (0.20 ha)
- Built: 1810
- Architectural style: Federal
- NRHP reference No.: 79000151

Significant dates
- Added to NRHP: June 14, 1979
- Removed from NRHP: August 29, 2024

The Laura E. Richards House was a historic house located in Gardiner, Maine. Built c.1810, it was a fine local example of Federal period architecture. It was primarily known as the home of Pulitzer Prize-winning author Laura E. Richards during the majority of her writing career. It was listed on the National Register of Historic Places in 1979.

The house was damaged and demolished as a result of a fire in December 2022, and was subsequently removed from the National Register in 2024.

== Description and history ==
The Laura E. Richards House stood in a residential area just south of downtown Gardiner. It was a 2 1/2-story wood-frame structure, with a hip roof, interior end chimneys, and clapboard exterior with denticulated cornice. The main facade faced northeast toward Dennis Street, and was five bays wide, with the center entrance framed by sidelight windows and pilasters, and topped by a half-round transom with entablature above. The interior had a typical Federal period central hall layout. Attached to the rear was a 1 1/2-story ell with a monitor roof, which joined it to a carriage barn.

The house was built c.1810 by Ebenezer Byram, who had purchased the land from Robert Hallowell Gardiner. In 1878, it was purchased by Henry and Laura E. Richards. Laura Richards was the daughter of Samuel Gridley Howe and Julia Ward Howe, the latter known for being the writer of the song "Battle Hymn of the Republic". The couple moved to Gardiner in 1876 after suffering financial reverses, and it was about that time that Laura Richards began her writing career. She was best known for a series of children's books, and was a corecipient of the inaugural Pulitzer Prize for a biography of her mother.

On December 24, 2022, the house was severely damaged by a fire, and was consequently demolished for safety reasons.

== See also ==
- National Register of Historic Places listings in Kennebec County, Maine
