= Samuel Gridley and Julia Ward Howe House =

Historic house in Boston, Massachusetts

- U.S. National Register of Historic Places
- U.S. National Historic Landmark
- U.S. National Historic Landmark District – Contributing property
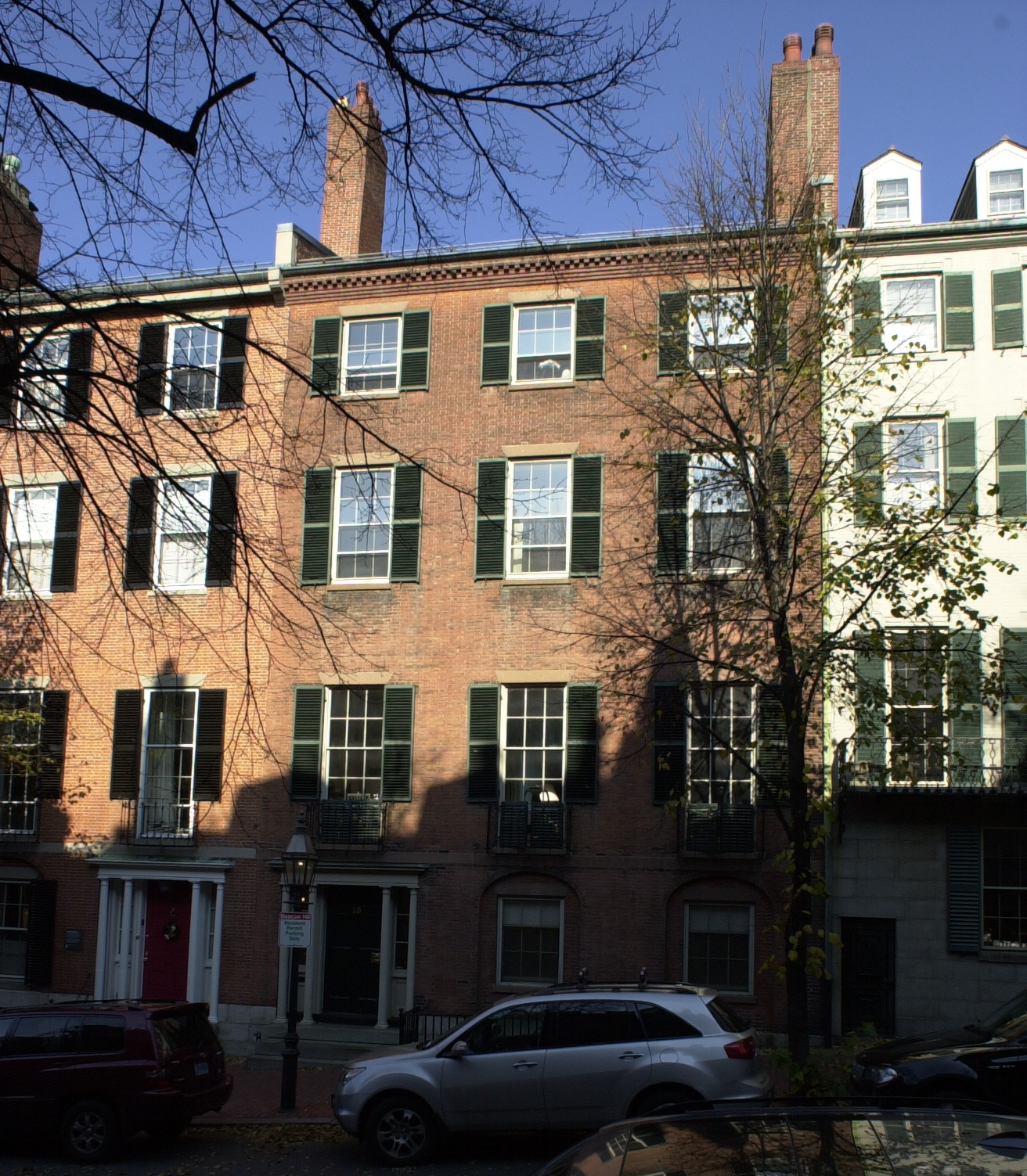

- Location within Boston Location within Massachusetts Location within the United States
- Location: 13 Chestnut St., Boston, Massachusetts
- Coordinates: 42°21′27.9″N 71°4′0.5″W
- Area: less than one acre
- Built: 1804
- Architect: Bulfinch, Charles
- Architectural style: Georgian
- Part of: Beacon Hill Historic District (ID66000130)
- NRHP reference No.: 74002044

Significant dates
- Added to NRHP: September 13, 1974
- Designated NHLDCP: October 15, 1966

The Samuel Gridley and Julia Ward Howe House is a historic rowhouse at 13 Chestnut Street in the Beacon Hill neighborhood of Boston, Massachusetts, United States. It was designated a National Historic Landmark in 1974 for its association with the social reform couple, Julia Ward Howe and Samuel Gridley Howe. The Howes lived in the house, which was likely designed by renowned Boston architect Charles Bulfinch, from 1863 to 1866. It has served as the temporary official residence of the British Consul General to New England since 2016.

== Description and history ==
The building is a four-story brick row house, one of three adjoining "Swan Houses" built by Hepzibah Swan, a wealthy widow, between 1804 and 1805 for her daughters. They are now accepted to have been designed by the noteworthy architect Charles Bulfinch, although documentary evidence supporting this notion is lacking, and the attribution has been attended with controversy. The house has a Georgian recessed doorway, windows recessed in arches on the first floor, and wrought iron railings on the second-floor windows.

Samuel Gridley Howe (1801–1876) was a medical doctor and an early champion of support for the physically handicapped. He was a founder and the first head (for 44 years) of what is now called the Perkins School for the Blind. In 1843 he married Julia Ward (1819–1910), the daughter of a wealthy New York City banker. The two were influential forces in the social reform movements of the mid-to-late 19th century, working to advance the causes of the abolition of slavery, including actively heading the Boston Vigilance Committee, which assisted fugitive slaves in the 1850s. Julia Ward Howe became nationally famous after writing "The Battle Hymn of the Republic" while visiting Washington, D. C. not long after moving into this house. She was a supporter and organizer of reform movements which long outlived her, notably those that supported women's suffrage.

The Howes lived for many years after their marriage at "Green Peace", a house which no longer stands, in South Boston. Thereafter they lived at a number of Boston addresses, of which this is the most significant. The house was designated a National Historic Landmark in 1966 and added to the National Register of Historic Places in 1974. It is a private residence and is not open to the public.

== See also ==
- List of National Historic Landmarks in Boston
- National Register of Historic Places listings in northern Boston, Massachusetts
