= The Hermaphrodite =

Unfinished novel by Julia Ward Howe

- Author: Julia Ward Howe
- Original title: "Laurence manuscript"
- Language: English
- Genre: Novel
- Publisher: University of Nebraska Press
- Publication date: 2004
- Publication place: United States
- Media type: Print (hardback)
- Pages: 208 pp
- ISBN: 0-8032-2415-X
- OCLC: 55085718
- Dewey Decimal: 813/.4 22
- LC Class: PS2016 .H47 2004

The Hermaphrodite is an incomplete novel by Julia Ward Howe about an intersex individual raised as a male in the United States in the first half of the nineteenth century, who in adulthood lives sometimes as a female and sometimes as a male. Its date of composition is uncertain, but estimated to be between 1846 and 1847. The term "hermaphrodite" was used until the mid-20th century to identify someone having reproductive organs normally associated with both male and female sexes. (Note: The word is derived from the Greek mythological figure Hermaphroditus, a young boy merged with a female water nymph and named by combining the names of the boy's male and female parents, Hermes and Aphrodite. In Howe's day, the word "hermaphrodite" was commonly used in botany. In 1845, one dictionary explained its use: "Hermaphrodite: A term formerly applied exclusively to signify a human creature possessed of the organs of both sexes. The term is now applied to other animals, and to plants.)

== Plot introduction ==
Laurence narrates the story. Though Laurence is intersex and as a child displays normative gender characteristics of both sexes, his unsettled father, Paternus, decides to raise Laurence as a male. Sent away to college, he excels in his studies, particularly in writing poetry that inflames the passions of an older widow, Emma. Laurence is not attracted to her and displays asexual tendencies. On the night of his graduation, Emma professes her love for him. When informed that Laurence is intersex, she goes into a deep state of shock and soon dies.

Laurence reacts with great emotion and returns home to his cold father. Paternus now displays how Laurence's condition repulses him and expresses his regret that Laurence will never father a male heir. He offers Laurence his inheritance in a premature bulk sum, if he will agree to allow Paternus to disown him. Laurence vehemently rejects the offer, instead offering the money to his younger (and gender-neutral) brother, Phil, in the hope that his brother will share the estate with him upon their father's death.

At one point Laurence hears two men compare him to the "lovely hermaphrodite" in the sculpture collection of the Villa Borghese, the Sleeping Hermaphroditus. (Note: Howe likely saw this statue on her first visit to Rome.)

Laurence (also called Laurent) lives most of his life as a man and then spends a period living as a woman. Both men and women fall in love with him and he responds to both. He explains how he has chosen to favor men or women: "When I wished to trifle, I preferred the latter. When I wished to reason gravely, I chose the former."

At the end of the story the secret is discovered, and some friends discuss the nature of Laurence's sexuality. Their observations are reflective of nineteenth-century views of gender.

A male friend Berto observes, "I recognize nothing distinctly feminine in the intellectual nature of Laurent, ... he is sometimes poetical and rhapsodical, but he reasons severely and logically, even as a man--he has moreover stern notions of duty which bend and fashion his life, instead of living fashioned by it, as is the case with women."

A female friend Briseida says, "I recognize in Laurent much that is strictly feminine, ... and in the name of the female sex, I claim her as one of us. Her modesty, her purity, her tenderness of heart belong only to woman .... It is true that she can reason better than most women, yet is she most herself when she feels, when she follows that instinctive, undoubting sense of inner truths which is only given to women and to angels."

A physician ("the Medicus"), as well as Berto and Briseida, also describe Laurence in terms of a unified gender:

- "one presenting a beautiful physical development, and combining in the spiritual nature all that is most attractive in either sex."
- "the poetic dream of the ancient sculptor, more beautiful, though less human, than either man or woman."
- "I cannot pronounce Laurent either man or woman ... I shall speak most justly if I say he is rather both than neither."
- "a heavenly superhuman mystery, one undivided, integral soul, needing not to seek on earth its other moiety, needing only to adore the God above it, and to labour for its brethren around it."

It is this unified-gender analysis which seems to prevail and conclude Laurence's story.

== Major themes ==
The text is unique, especially for the time period in which it was written. Its Romantic themes of self-discovery, sublimity in nature, and the tumultuous intersection between death and love combine with more modern investigations of asexuality and challenges to cultural patriarchy, to produce a story that is at once a reminder of a particular time in American history, and yet also a remarkably prophetic speculation about changes to come.

== Publication history ==
Howe's first published work was a review in the Literary and Theological Review of Joselyn by Alphonse de Lamartine. In that tale, the title character at first struggles to understand his attraction to a young man named Laurence, and Laurence is eventually discovered to be biologically female. In 1843 Howe described something that may be a version of what has become known as The Hermaphrodite:

Yet my pen has been unusually busy during the last year ... and though the golden tide is now at its ebb, I live in the hope that it may rise again in time to float off the stranded wreck of a novel, or rather story, in the which I have been deeply engaged for three months past. It is not, understand me, a moral and fashionable work, destined to be published in three volumes, but the history of a strange being, written as truly as I know how to write it. Whether it will ever be published I cannot tell, but I should like to have had you read it, and to talk with you about it.

Howe did not have her novel published. Howe's granddaughter donated several boxes of Howe's papers to the Houghton Library at Harvard in 1951 and the manuscript–roughly 400 pages–was discovered there in 1977 by Mary H. Grant, a graduate student doing research. Grant described the experience as frustrating "because it was going to take hours of precious research time to try to make sense of this wandering document when I had so little babysitting time available in which to work." The manuscript lacks a title page and there is no record of the title Howe intended for her novel. The novel's date of composition is uncertain.

Gary Williams, a professor at the University of Idaho, read the text at Harvard in 1995. He hypothesizes that it was probably written between 1846 and 1847. The manuscript, which he also calls the "Laurence manuscript", is a series of fragments and is missing large passages. The edition that he published in 2004 starts with the second page of the manuscript, lacks the original's pages 118 to 132, and contains a third segment that is composed "of several much shorter manuscript fragments, only one of which is numbered and some of which are different drafts of the same scene".
