= Florence Howe Hall =

American writer, critic, and lecturer (1845–1922)

Florence Marion Howe Hall
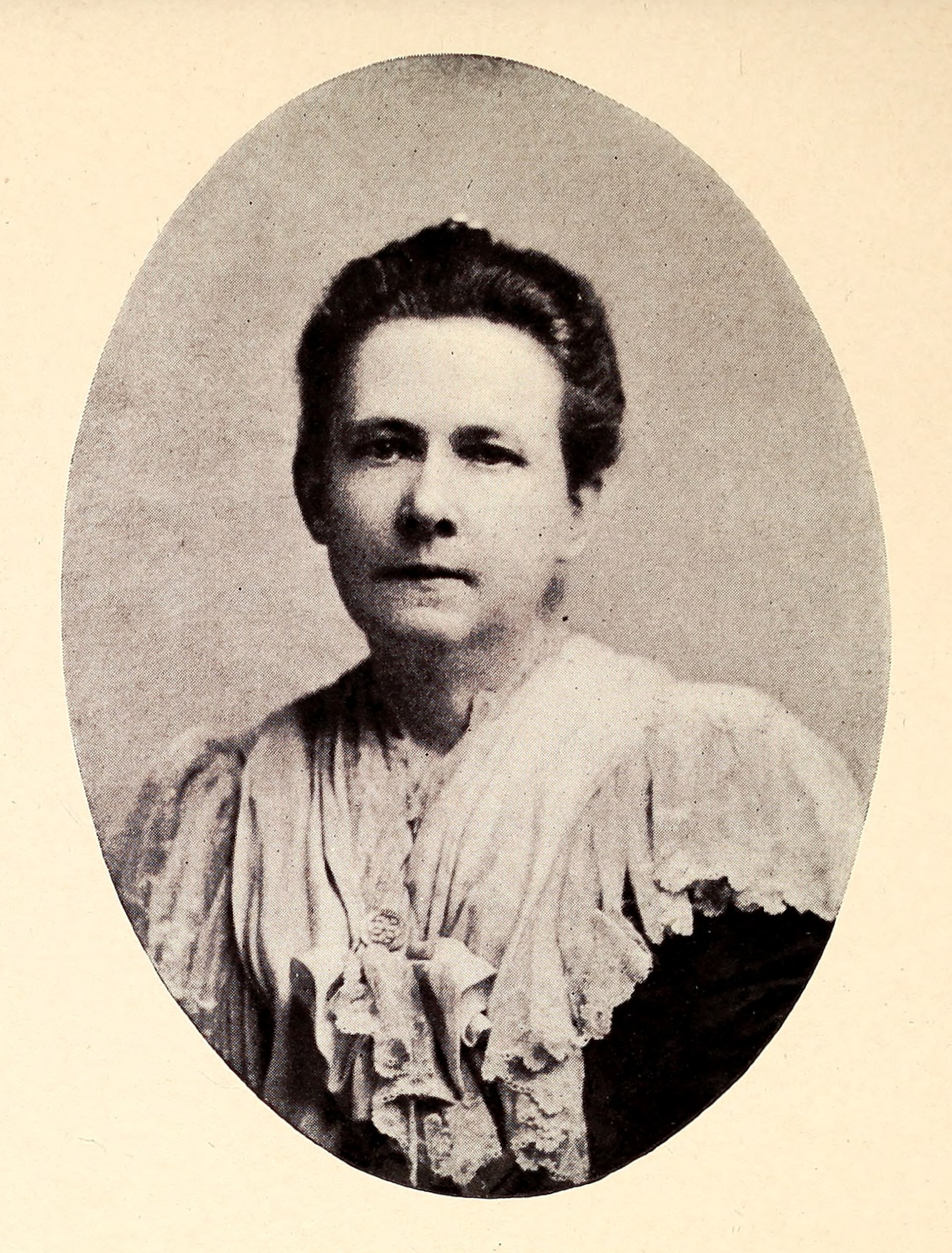
- Born: Florence Marion Howe; August 25, 1845; South Boston, Massachusetts
- Died: April 10, 1922 (aged 76); High Bridge, New Jersey
- Occupations: Author; critic; lecturer

Florence Marion Howe Hall (August 25, 1845 – April 10, 1922) was an American writer, critic, and lecturer about women's suffrage in the United States. Along with her two sisters, Laura Elizabeth Richards and Maude Howe Elliott, Hall received the first Pulitzer Prize for a biography, Julia Ward Howe.

== Early life ==
Howe was born on August 25, 1845, in South Boston, Massachusetts. She was named Florence after Florence Nightingale, her godmother and friend of her parents, and Marion after her great—great-granduncle, General Francis Marion of the Revolutionary War fame. Florence was the second of six children born of the marriage of Dr. Samuel Gridley Howe, a prominent physician, abolitionist and founder of the Perkins Institution and Massachusetts School for the Blind, and Julia Ward Howe, a poet and author, best known for writing "The Battle Hymn of the Republic". Her elder sister was Julia Romana Howe; and her younger siblings included Henry Marion Howe, a metallurgist; Laura (née Howe) Richards and Maud (née Howe) Elliott, both authors; Her younger sister Maud married John Elliott, an English muralist and illustrator.

She was educated at private schools in Boston and nearby, including the Agassiz School of Cambridge. She later studied music with Otto Dresel, the pianist, music teacher and composer.

== Career ==
She was a writer, critic, and lecturer about women's suffrage in the United States, serving as president of the New Jersey State Woman Suffrage Association from 1893 to 1900.

Hall began her writing career with children's stories, but quickly moved on to memoirs and etiquette books.

She was the author of Social Customs: Boys, Girls and Manners, The Correct Thing in Good Society, Social Usages at Washington, which she wrote with her sister Maud Elliot. In 1917, Hall received a Pulitzer Prize for her biography of her mother, entitled Julia Ward Howe, the first Pulitzer Prize for a biography. Along with her sisters, she also wrote a biography of Laura Bridgeman, who was a student of their father's.

For eleven years, Hall served as president of the Plainfield, New Jersey branch of the National Alliance of Unitarian Women and, for several years, regent of the Continental Chapter of the Daughters of the American Revolution.

== Personal life ==
On November 15, 1871, she was married to David Prescott Hall (1845–1907). David, a lawyer, was the youngest son of six children born to David Priestley Hall, a Harvard educated lawyer, and Caroline (née Minturn) Hall, who spent their summers in Newport, Rhode Island. The couple met while Hall was in Newport and had four children:

- Samuel Prescott Hall (1872–1958), who married Sarah Thomson (1873–1940). He was a graduate of Harvard.
- Caroline Minturn Hall (1874–1972), who married the Rev. Hugh Birckhead (1876–1929), Rector of St. George's Church in Manhattan. Caroline studied painting for seven years in Paris.
- Henry Marion Hall (1877–1963), who married Alice Louise Haskell (1880–1977). He was a graduate of Harvard and Columbia University.
- John Howe Hall (1881–1953), who married Gertrude Earnshaw (1892–1964). He was a graduate of Harvard.

In New York City, they lived at 17 Livingston Place. In 1893, the Halls moved to Plainfield, New Jersey, where he died at his home on June 5, 1907. Florence died on April 10, 1922, in High Bridge, New Jersey. She was buried in Mount Auburn Cemetery in Cambridge, Massachusetts.
