= John Elliott (artist) =

British-American painter (1858–1925)

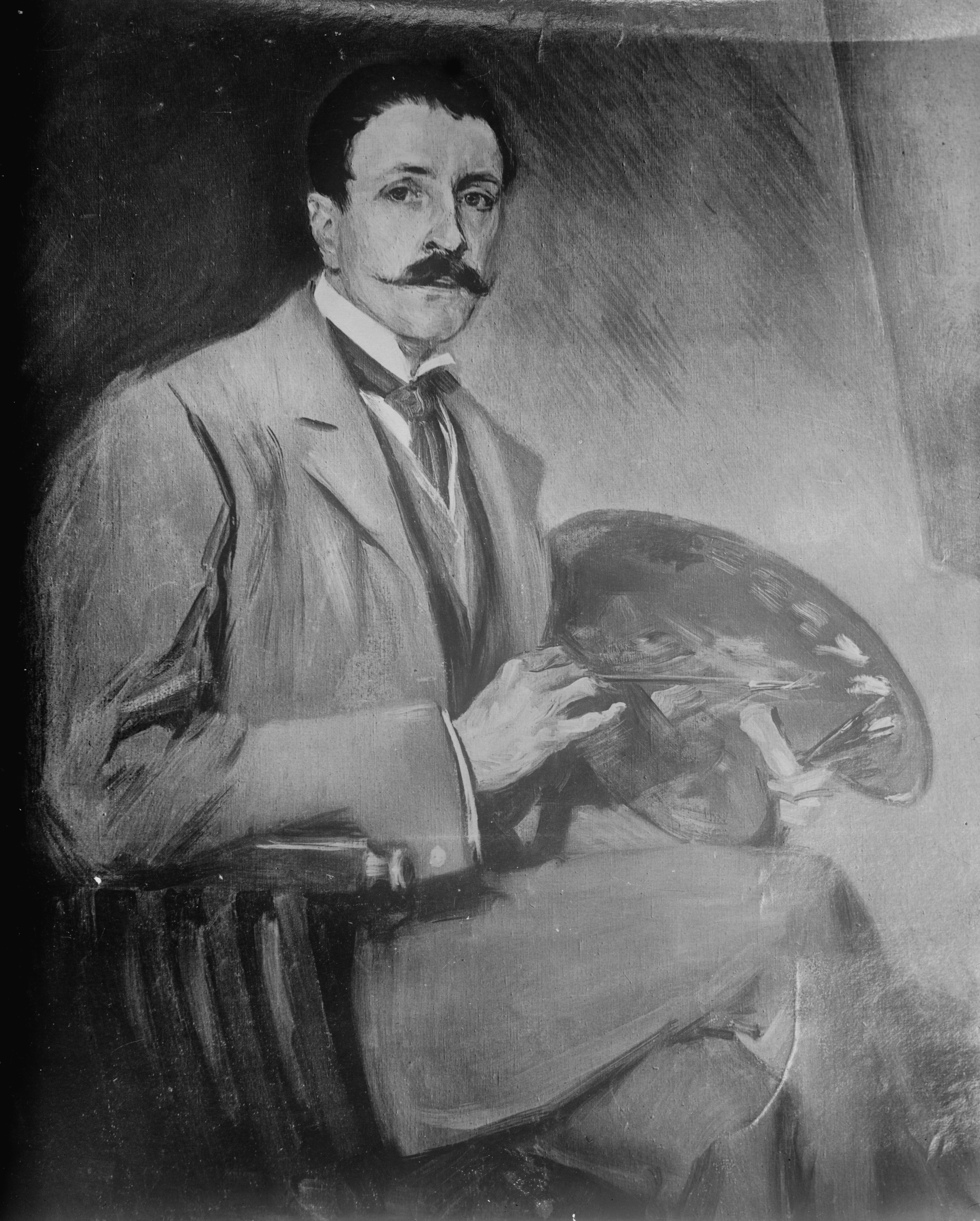
John Elliott Portrait by José Villegas Cordero, 1905

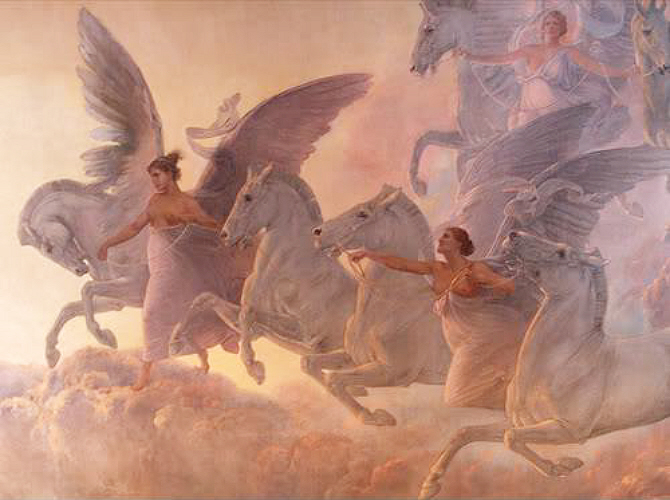
DETAIL: "The Triumph of Time" Mural by John Elliott at the Boston Public Library

John Elliott (April 22, 1858 – May 26, 1925) was an artist, illustrator, and muralist. Born in Lincolnshire, England, he studied in Paris at the Académie Julian under Carolus-Duran. In 1878, he went to Rome to study with José Villegas Cordero and there met his future wife, Maud Howe, Pulitzer-prize-winning American writer and the daughter of Julia Ward Howe, the author of "The Battle Hymn of the Republic." Elliott is known for his epic Symbolist murals including working alongside his friend and colleague John Singer Sargent to provide murals for the Boston Central Library, as well as creating a mural in the National Museum (now the Smithsonian National Museum of Natural History.)

== Works ==
- The Making of the First Musical Instrument, C. 1900 Oil on Canvas; 81.3 x 137.2 cm. (32 x 54 in.) Large Mural of Pan (god) reclining by a stream ( featured on pages 138–139 in the Biography "John Elliott: The Story of an Artist" https://babel.hathitrust.org/cgi/pt?id=mdp.39015014571718;view=1up;seq=202 Published 1930)...previously in the Private Collection of Maud Howe Elliott
- a series red-chalk drawings making up a memorial collection of the Lafayette Escadrille and other Americans who died in the First World War, currently in the National Museum of American Art, Washington.
- Triumph of Time, c. 1901, a two-panel mural on the ceiling of the Elliott room of the McKim Building of the Boston Public Library. The mural shows 12 female figures representing the Hours spread among twenty horses representing Christian Centuries. The horses are pulling a chariot carrying a male figure representing Time.
- Julia Ward Howe, 1901, red chalk drawing on gray wove paper. Given to the Metropolitan Museum of Art in 1904.
- Diana of the Tides, 1908, a mural in the National Museum, now the Smithsonian National Museum of Natural History. In the paleontology hall, but currently not visible due to a wall.
- Julia Ward Howe, a portrait in oil on canvas, finished c. 1925 by William Henry Cotton after Elliott's death . On display at the National Portrait Gallery, Smithsonian Institution.
- Chevalier, a portrait in oil on canvas Samuel Gridley Howe as Surgeon General in the Greek War for Independence, wearing the costume of a Greek soldier. It currently hangs in the John Hay Library at Brown University.
- Terrace Garden, Rome, an oil painting on canvas depicting the artist's terrace at his apartment in Rome. It was painted at the request of Larz Anderson, who met his wife Isabel Weld Perkins for the first time at this location.
