= Maud Howe Elliott =

American writer (1854–1948)

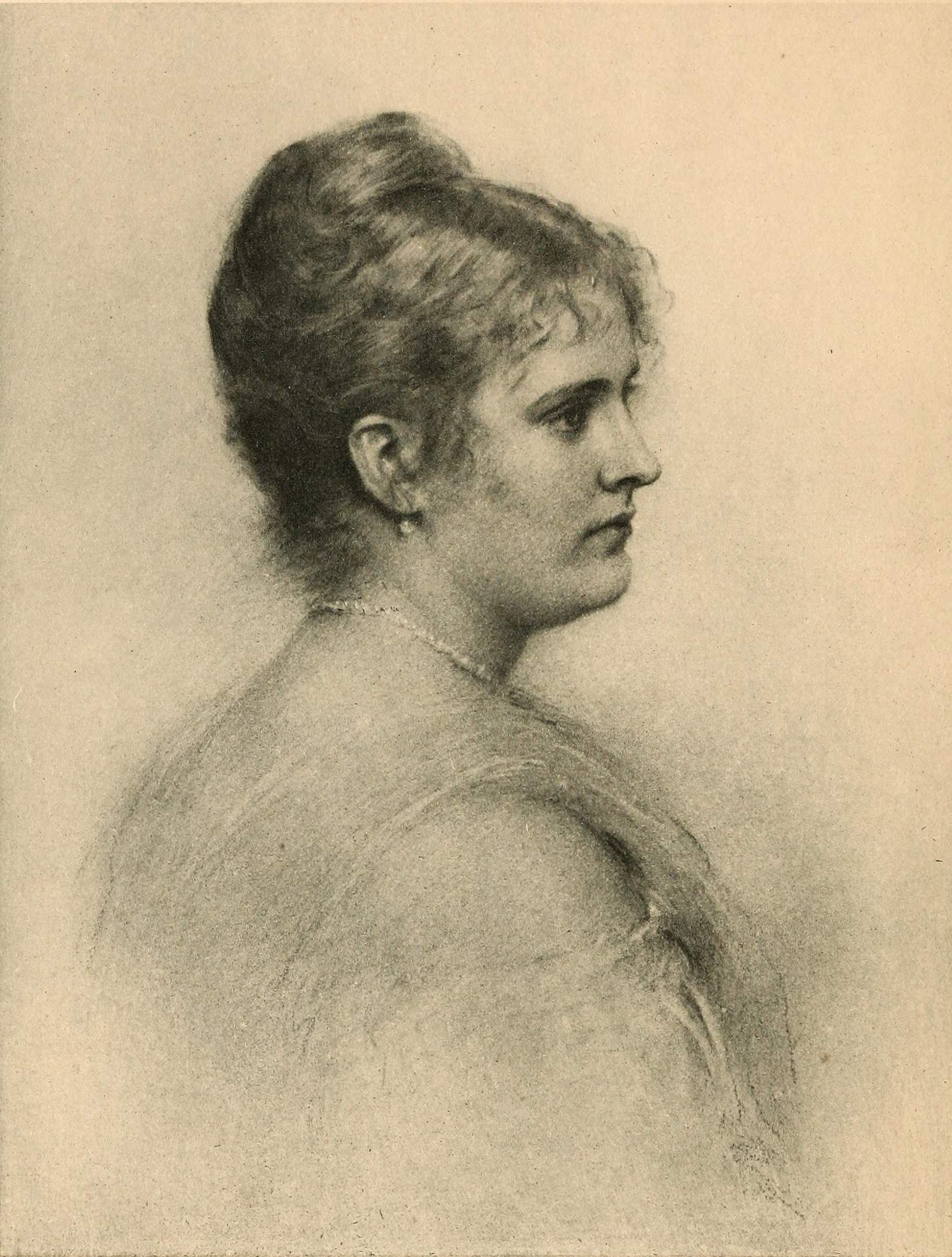
- Born: Maud Howe; November 9, 1854 Boston, Massachusetts, US
- Died: March 19, 1948 (aged 93) Newport, Rhode Island, US
- Occupation: Novelist
- Notable awards: 1917 Pulitzer Prize
- Spouse: John Elliott

Maud Howe Elliott (November 9, 1854 – March 19, 1948) was an American novelist, most notable for her Pulitzer Prize-winning collaboration with her sisters, Laura E. Richards and Florence Hall, on their mother's biography The Life of Julia Ward Howe (1916). Her other works included A Newport Aquarelle (1883); Phillida (1891); Kasper Craig (1892); Mammon, later published as Honor: A Novel (1893); Roma Beata, Letters from the Eternal City (1903); Sun and Shadow in Spain (1908);The Eleventh Hour in the Life of Julia Ward Howe (1911); Three Generations (1923); Lord Byron's Helmet (1927); John Elliott, The Story of an Artist (1930); My Cousin, F. Marion Crawford (1934); and This Was My Newport (1944).

== Biography ==
Maud Howe was born on November 9, 1854, at the Perkins School for the Blind in Boston, founded by her father, Samuel Gridley Howe. Her mother was the author and abolitionist Julia Ward Howe. In 1887, she married English artist John Elliott. A socialite, Elliott was one of the founding members of the Society of the Four Arts in Palm Beach, Florida She was the honorary president of the organization until her death.

After her marriage, she lived in Chicago (1892–93) and Italy (1894-1900/1906-1910), before moving to Newport, where she spent the rest of her life. She was a founding member of the Newport Art Association, and served as its secretary from 1912 to 1942. Howe was also a founder of the Progressive Party and took part in the suffrage movement. In 1920, when women gained the right to vote, Maud Howe Elliott was unable to vote because a Congressional Act revoked her citizenship. This act specifically targeted American-born women who had married foreigners, stripping them of their citizenship rights. Notably, this legislation only affected women, as men who were married to foreign citizens retained their citizenship. Maud was greatly influenced by her mother's ideas and convictions about women's role in society and particularly so in terms of women's suffrage. She fought passionately for women to be liberated from the societal expectations and roles determined to them by male dominated society. In 1940, she was attributed with an honorary degree of Doctor of Letters from Brown University.

She wrote a travel book about Spain, Sun and Shadow in Spain (1908), which served, among many other author-travellers' works such as Gaston Vullier, Dorothy and Mortimer Menpes, as a fundamental milestone in the promotion of Spanish tourism amongst middle classes of America and Europe.

She died on March 19, 1948, in Newport, Rhode Island.

== Bibliography ==
- Boyer, Paul S. "Howe, Julia Ward" in Notable American Women 1607–1950. Cambridge, MA: The Belknap Press of Harvard University Press, 1971. 2:225-229.
- Grinnell, Nancy Whipple, Carrying the Torch. Maud Howe Elliott and the American Renaissance. University Press of New England, 2014.
- Elliott, Maud Howe, Three Generations. Boston, Little, Brown, and Co. 1923. (Full text available in the Internet Archive)
- Commire, Anne., and Deborah. Klezmer. Women in World History : A Biographical Encyclopedia / Anne Commire, Editor ; Deborah Klezmer, Associate Editor. Waterford, CT: Yorkin Publications, 1999. Print.
