= Thomas Stringer (carpenter) =

American deafblind carpenter

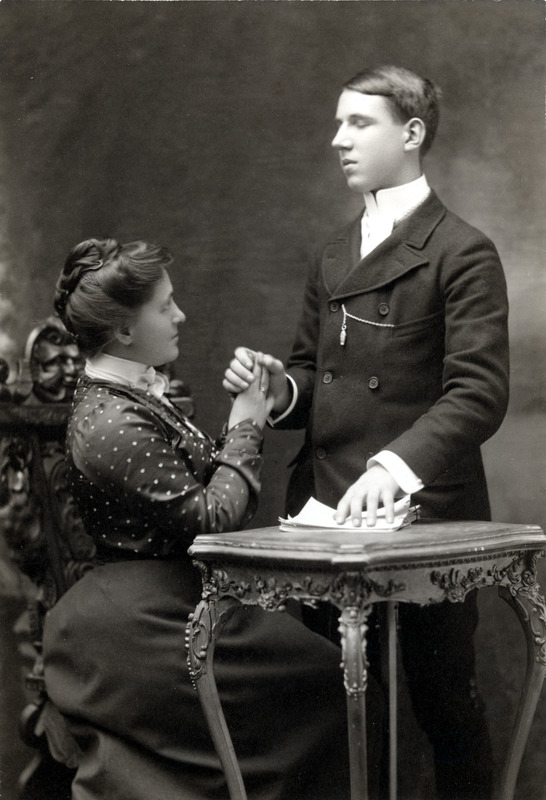
- Stringer (right) with his teacher; 1900
- Born: July 3, 1886; Washington, Pennsylvania, United States
- Died: October 11, 1945 (aged 59)
- Occupation: carpenter

Thomas Stringer (July 3, 1886 – October 11, 1945) was an American carpenter. Deafblind from a young age, Stringer was brought to the Perkins Institution for the Blind through the fundraising of Helen Keller. He was well-regarded at the school for his carpentry skills, which he used to help support himself after graduating from Perkins in 1913.

== Biography ==
Thomas Stringer was born on July 3, 1886, in Washington, Pennsylvania. He became blind and deaf after being infected with spinal meningitis at age two or three. His mother died soon after his illness, and his father placed him in a hospital in Allegheny. He was confined to a bed and seemed destined to live in a series of almshouses.

Stringer's plight came to the attention of ten-year-old Helen Keller, who was determined to bring Tommy to the Perkins Institution for the Blind. Keller used creative means to raise tuition for Stringer to attend Perkins: when her dog Lioness was killed by a policeman, her letter to a benefactor recounting the tragedy was published widely, which led to people sending in donations to purchase her another dog. Instead, Helen donated the money to a fund established by Perkins director Michael Anagnos to support Stringer.

Stringer was brought to the Kindergarten for the Blind at Jamaica Plain in Boston. In April 1891, at four years and nine months old, he was brought to the Perkins Institution. After learning to walk, dress, and feed himself, Stringer was taught to recognize words fingerspelled into his hand. The first word he recognized, in November 1891, was bread.

His reading and talking were conducted through fingerspelling, but his instructors insisted on Stringer learning to read from the lips and to articulate speech, requiring a spoken sentence practiced each morning. Arithmetic was his strongest subject in school; his handwriting was described as "firm, neat and legible." In the 1890s he was instructed by Gustaf Larsson in sloyd, a system of handicraft-based education. His summers were spent at Wrentham, Massachusetts, at the farmhouse of Reverend William L. Brown.

In 1900, at age thirteen, he was admitted to Lowell Grammar School in Roxbury as a sixth grader. He learned alongside his classmates with the assistance of his teacher and interpreter, Helen S. Conley; Stringer graduated from the grammar school in 1903.

By age fifteen he was installing shelves and steps at the Perkins kindergarten; he was called upon to replace worn window-cords and replace broken locks. At the house and farm where he spent his summers, he constructed a railing on a set of stairs and secured a gas pipe in the barn to ensure the cats who lived there would be safe. Stringer traveled through the northeast United States, visiting the Philadelphia Mint and being received by President William McKinley in the White House.

Stringer spent twenty years at Perkins, graduating in 1913. After graduating, he moved in with a guardian, Lee Edgarton, a grocer in Fulton, New York. The fund that Anagnos set up for Stringer provided a $1,000 per year stipend for his income, as well as a workbench and a tandem bicycle he could ride with a seeing companion. He also earned money making vegetable crates for local farmers. Stringer died at age fifty-nine on October 11, 1945.
