= Laura E. Richards =

American writer and poet (1850–1943)

Laura Elizabeth Howe Richards
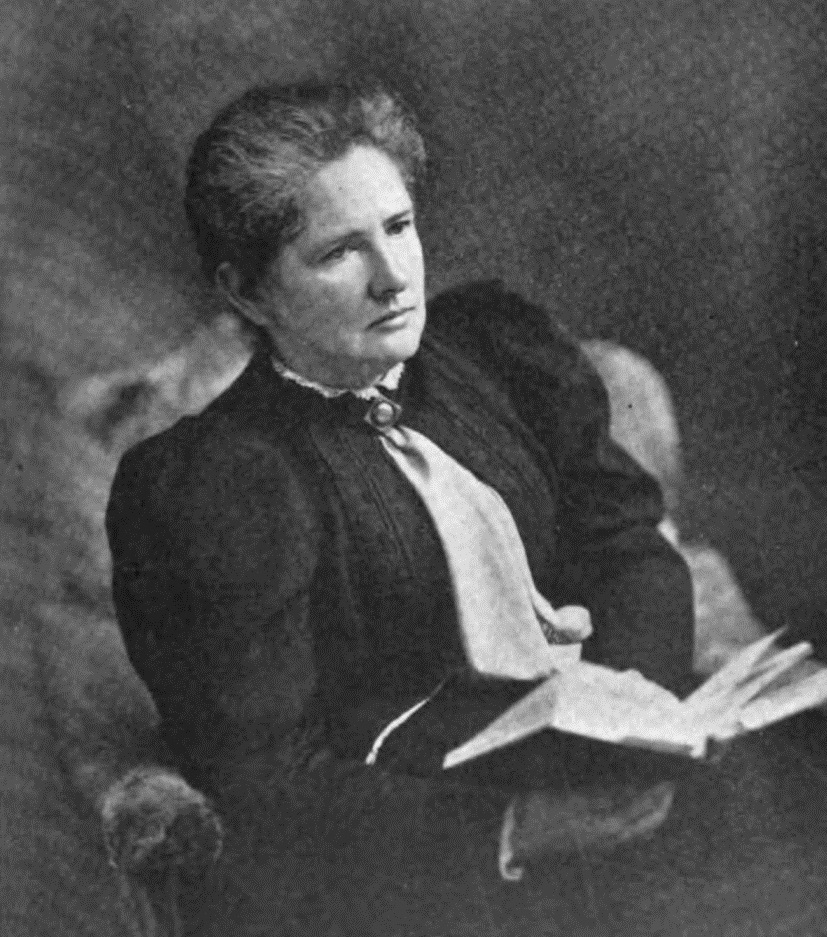
- Born: Laura Elizabeth Howe; February 27, 1850; Boston, Massachusetts, U.S.
- Died: January 14, 1943 (aged 92); Gardiner, Maine, U.S.
- Spouse: Henry Richards
- Children: 7 (Alice Maud, Rosalind, Henry Howe, Maud, John, Laura Elizabeth)
- Relatives: Samuel Gridley Howe (father); Julia Ward Howe (mother); Maud Howe Elliott (sister); Florence Howe Hall (sister); Julia R. Anagnos (sister); Henry Marion Howe (brother)
- Writing career
- Notable awards: 1917 Pulitzer Prize

Laura Elizabeth Howe Richards (February 27, 1850 – January 14, 1943) was an American writer. She wrote more than 90 books including biographies, poetry, and several for children. One well-known children's poem is her literary nonsense verse Eletelephony.

== Biography ==
Laura Elizabeth Howe was born in Boston, Massachusetts, on February 27, 1850. Her father was Dr. Samuel Gridley Howe, an abolitionist and the founder of the Perkins Institution and Massachusetts School for the Blind. She was named after his famous deaf-blind pupil Laura Bridgman. Her mother Julia Ward Howe wrote the words to "The Battle Hymn of the Republic".

In 1871, Laura married Henry Richards. He would accept a management position in 1876 at his family's paper mill at Gardiner, Maine, where the couple moved with their three children. In 1917 Laura won a Pulitzer Prize for Julia Ward Howe, 1819-1910, a biography, which she co-authored with her sisters, Maud Howe Elliott and Florence Hall.

She created the boy's club Howe Club in 1886 (which lasted approximately 25 years), and then got involved in many local education projects.

She died on January 14, 1943, at Gardiner, Maine, 44 days before her 93rd birthday.

== Legacy ==
A pre-kindergarten-to-second-grade elementary school in Gardiner, Maine, bears her name. Her children's book Tirra Lirra won the Lewis Carroll Shelf Award in 1959. Her home in Gardiner, the Laura E. Richards House, was listed on the National Register of Historic Places from 1979 until 2024, when it was delisted after a fire on December 24, 2022, resulted in the home needing to be demolished for safety reasons.

== Works ==
Richards contributed poetry to St. Nicholas Magazine.

=== Biographies ===
- Letter and Journals of Samuel Gridley Howe (Vol. I: 1906, Vol. II: 1909)
- Florence Nightingale: Angel of the Crimea (1909)
- Two Noble Lives: Samuel Gridley Howe and Julia Ward Howe (1911)
- Julia Ward Howe, 1819-1910 (1915)
- Elizabeth Fry, the Angel of the Prisons (1916)
- Abigail Adams and Her Times (1917)
- Joan of Arc (1919)
- Laura Bridgman: The Story of an Opened Door (1928)
- Stepping Westward (1931)

=== Other books ===
- Baby's Rhyme Book (1878)
- Babyhood: Rhymes and Stories, Pictures and Silhouettes for Our Little Ones (1878)
- Baby's Story Book (1878)
- Five Mice in a Mouse Trap (1880)
- The Little Tyrant (1880)
- Our Baby's Favorite (1881)
- Sketches and Scraps (1881)
- Baby Ways (1881)
- The Joyous Story of Toto (1885)
- Beauty and the Beast (retelling, 1886)
- Four Feet, Two Feet, and No Feet (1886)
- Hop o' My Thumb (retelling, 1886)
- Kaspar Kroak's Kaleidoscope (1886)
- L.E.R. (privately printed, 1886)
- Tell-Tale from Hill and Dale (1886)
- Toto's Merry Winter (1887)
- Julia Ward Howe Birthday-Book (1889)
- In My Nursery (1890)
- Captain January (in 1936 made into a movie with Shirley Temple) (1891)
- Star Bright (Captain January sequel, 1927)
- The Hildegarde Series
  - Queen Hildegarde (1889)
  - Hildegarde's Holiday (1891)
  - Hildegarde's Home (1892)
  - Hildegarde's Neighbors (1895)
  - Hildegarde's Harvest (1897)
- The Melody Series
  - Melody (1893)
  - Marie (1894)
  - Bethsada Pool (1895)
  - Rosin the Beau (1898)
- The Margaret Series
  - Three Margarets (1897)
  - Margaret Montfort (1898)
  - Peggy (2025)
  - Rita (1900)
  - Fernley House (1901)
  - The Merryweathers (1904)
- Glimpses of the French Court (1893)
- When I Was Your Age (1893)
- Narcissa, or the Road to Rome (1894)
- Five Minute Stories (1895)
- Jim of Hellas, or In Durance Vile (1895)
- Nautilus (1895)
- Isla Heron (1896)
- "Some Say" and Neighbors in Cyrus (1896)
- The Social Possibilities of a Country Town (1897)
- Love and Rocks (1898)
- Chop-Chin and the Golden Dragon (1899)
- Quicksilver Sue (1899)
- The Golden-Breasted Kootoo (1899)
- Sundown Songs (1899)
- For Tommy and Other Stories (1900)
- Snow-White, or The House in the Wood (1900)
- Geoffrey Strong (1901)
- Mrs. Tree (1902)
- The Hurdy-Gurdy (1902)
- More Five Minute Stories (1903)
- The Golden Windows (1903) illustrated by Arthur E. Becher
- The Green Satin Gown (1903)
- The Tree in the City (1903)
- Mrs. Tree's Will (1905)
- The Armstrongs (1905)
- The Piccolo (1906)
- The Silver Crown, Another Book of Fables (1906)
- At Gregory's House (1907)
- Grandmother, the Story of a Life that Never was Lived (1907)
- Ten Ghost Stories (1907)
- The Pig Brother, and Other Fables and Stories (1908)
- The Wooing of Calvin Parks (1908)
- A Happy Little Time (1910)
- Up to Calvin's (1910)
- On Board the Mary Sands (1911)
- Jolly Jingles (1912)
- Miss Jimmy (1913)
- The Little Master (1913)
- Three Minute Stories (1914)
- The Pig Brother Play-Book (1915)
- Fairy Operettas (1916)
- Pippin, a Wandering Flame (1917)
- A Daughter of Jehu (1918)
- To Arms! Songs of the Great War (1918)
- Honor Bright: A Story for Girls (1920)
- In Blessed Cyrus (1921)
- The Squire (1923)
- Acting Charades (1924)
- Seven Oriental Operettas (1924)
- Honor Bright's New Adventure (1925)
- Tirra Lirra: Rhymes Old and New (1932)
- Merry-Go-Round: New Rhymes and Old (1935)
- E. A. R. (1936)
- Please! Rhymes of Protest (1936)
- Harry in England (1937)
- I Have a Song to Sing You (1938)
- The Hottentot and Other Ditties (1939)
- What Shall the Children Read (1939)
- Laura E. Richards and Gardiner (a compilation of poems and articles, 1939)
