= SS Samuel G. Howe =

World War II Liberty ship of the United States

History

United States
Name	Samuel G. Howe
Namesake	Samuel G. Howe
Owner	War Shipping Administration (WSA)
Operator	Isbrandstsen Steamship Co., Inc.
Ordered	as type (EC2-S-C1) hull, MC hull 2324
Builder	J.A. Jones Construction, Panama City, Florida
Cost	$620,974
Yard number	65
Way number	3
Laid down	7 September 1944
Launched	17 October 1944
Sponsored by	Mrs. Jimmy Mann
Completed	30 October 1944
Identification	Call sign: KTEG
Fate	Placed in the National Defense Reserve Fleet, Mobile, Alabama, 8 September 1948; Sold for scrapping, 17 January 1969, withdrawn from the fleet, 27 January 1969

General characteristics
Class and type	Liberty ship; type EC2-S-C1, standard
Tonnage	10,865 LT DWT; 7,176 GRT
Displacement	3,380 long tons (3,434 t) (light); 14,245 long tons (14,474 t) (max)
Length	441 feet 6 inches (135 m) oa; 416 feet (127 m) pp; 427 feet (130 m) lwl
Beam	57 feet (17 m)
Draft	27 ft 9.25 in (8.4646 m)
Installed power	2 × Oil fired 450 °F (232 °C) boilers, operating at 220 psi (1,500 kPa); 2,500 hp (1,900 kW)
Propulsion	1 × triple-expansion steam engine, (manufactured by Filer and Stowell, Milwaukee, Wisconsin); 1 × screw propeller
Speed	11.5 knots (21.3 km/h; 13.2 mph)
Capacity	562,608 cubic feet (15,931 m^{3}) (grain); 499,573 cubic feet (14,146 m^{3}) (bale)
Complement	38–62 USMM; 21–40 USNAG
Armament	Varied by ship; Bow-mounted 3-inch (76 mm)/50-caliber gun; Stern-mounted 4-inch (102 mm)/50-caliber gun; 2–8 × single 20-millimeter (0.79 in) Oerlikon anti-aircraft (AA) cannons and/or, 2–8 × 37-millimeter (1.46 in) M1 AA guns

SS Samuel G. Howe was a Liberty ship built in the United States during World War II. She was named after Samuel G. Howe, a nineteenth century American physician, abolitionist, and an advocate of education for the blind.

== Construction ==
Samuel G. Howe was laid down on 7 September 1944, under a Maritime Commission (MARCOM) contract, MC hull 2324, by J.A. Jones Construction, Panama City, Florida; sponsored by Mrs. Jimmy Mann, wife of plant superintendent, and launched on 17 October 1944.

== History ==
She was allocated to Isbrandstsen Steamship Co. Inc., 30 October 1944. On 8 September 1948, she was laid up in the National Defense Reserve Fleet, Mobile, Alabama.

She was sold for scrapping, 17 January 1969, to Union Minerals and Alloys Corporation, for $40,125. She was withdrawn from the fleet, 27 January 1969.

== Bibliography ==
- "Jones Construction, Panama City FL". www.ShipbuildingHistory.com. 13 October 2010.
- Maritime Administration. "Samuel G. Howe". Ship History Database Vessel Status Card. U.S. Department of Transportation, Maritime Administration. This article incorporates text from this source, which is in the public domain.
- Davies, James (May 2004). "Specifications (As-Built)" (PDF). p. 23.
- "SS Samuel G. Howe".
