= Henry Marion Howe =

American metallurgist (1848–1922)

Dr. Henry Marion Howe
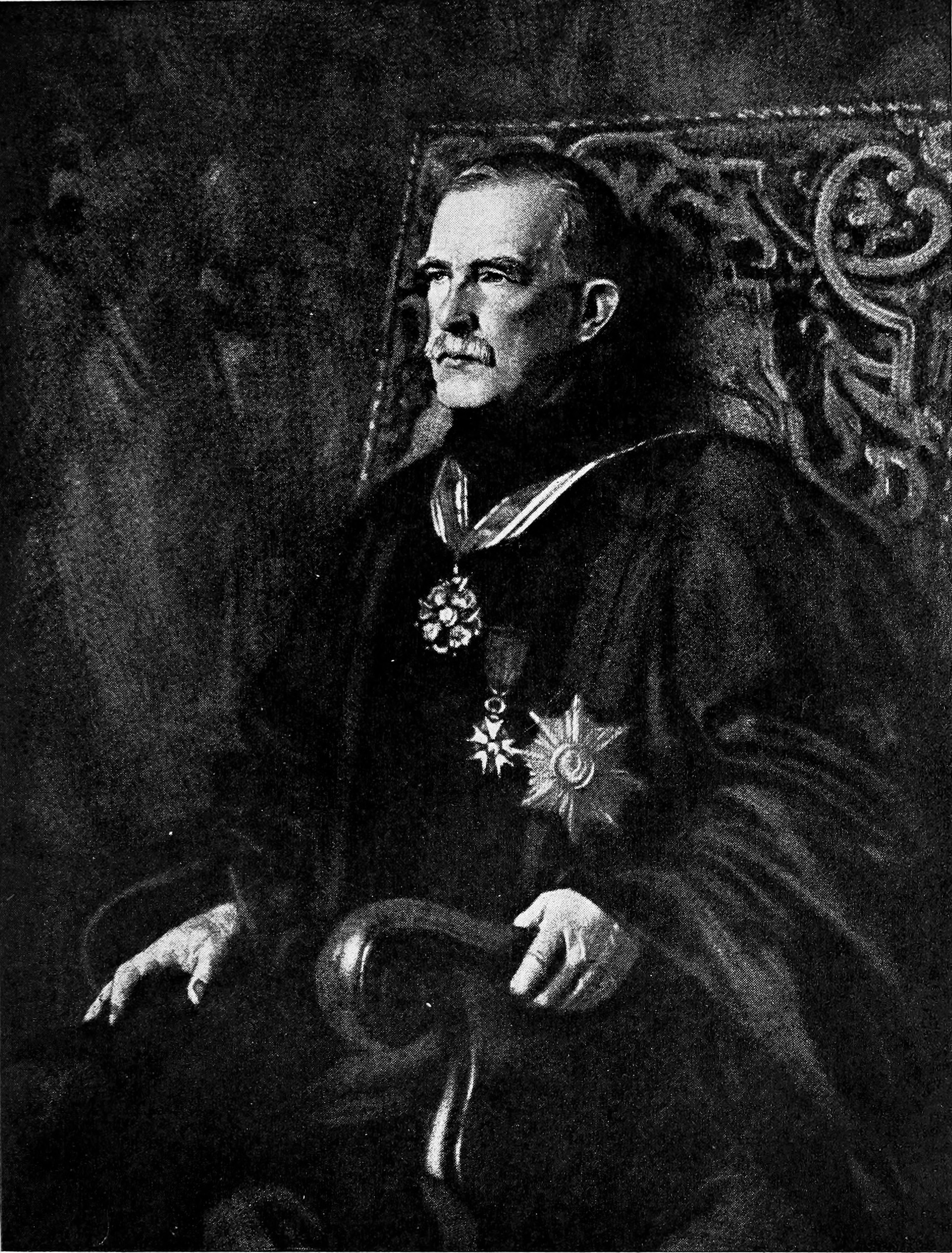
- Born: March 2, 1848; Boston, Massachusetts, U.S.
- Died: May 14, 1922 (aged 74); Bedford Hills, New York, U.S.
- Education: Boston Latin School; Harvard College
- Spouse: Fannie Gay (m. 1874)
- Parent(s): Samuel Gridley Howe; Julia Ward Howe

Henry Marion Howe (2 March 1848 – 14 May 1922) was an American metallurgist, the son of Samuel Gridley Howe and Julia Ward Howe.

== Education ==
Howe attended the Boston Latin School, class of 1865, then Harvard College, class of 1869. In 1871, he graduated from the Massachusetts Institute of Technology (M.I.T.) with a degree of "graduate in the department of geology and mining science", later renamed a Bachelor of Science. He received an A.M. degree in 1872 and an LL.D. in 1905 from Harvard.

== Career ==
He worked in industry from 1872 to 1882 in the iron and then the copper industries, in the U.S., Chile, Quebec, New Jersey, and Arizona. From 1883 to 1897, he was a consulting metallurgist in Boston, and simultaneously a lecturer at M.I.T. His first book, Copper Smelting, was published in 1885. His second book, The Metallurgy of Steel, was published in 1891. In 1897, he took a chair in metallurgy at Columbia University. In 1903, he published his Iron, Steel, and Other Alloys. He wrote the "Iron and Steel" article for the Encyclopædia Britannica, 11th edition (1911). He retired in 1913 and devoted himself to research in his Green Peace Laboratory at his home in Bedford Hills. In 1916, he published The Metallography of Steel and Cast Iron.

Iron, the most abundant and the cheapest of the heavy metals, the strongest and most magnetic of known substances, is perhaps also the most indispensable of all save the air we breathe and the water we drink. For one kind of meat we could substitute another; wool could be replaced by cotton, silk or fur; were our common silicate glass gone, we could probably perfect and cheapen some other of the transparent solids; but even if the earth could be made to yield any substitute for the forty or fifty million tons of iron which we use each year for rails, wire, machinery, and structural purposes of many kinds, we could not replace either the steel of our cutting tools or the iron of our magnets, the basis of all commercial electricity. This usefulness iron owes in part, indeed, to its abundance, through which it has led us in the last few thousands of years to adapt our ways to its properties; but still in chief part first to the single qualities in which it excels, such as its strength, its magnetism, and the property which it alone has of being made at will extremely hard by sudden cooling and soft and extremely pliable by slow cooling; second, to the special combinations of useful properties in which it excels, such as its strength with its ready welding and shaping both hot and cold; and third, to the great variety of its properties. It is a very Proteus. It is extremely hard in our files and razors, and extremely soft in our horse-shoe nails, which in some countries the smith rejects unless he can bend them on his forehead; with iron we cut and shape iron. It is extremely magnetic and almost non-magnetic; as brittle as glass and almost as pliable and ductile as copper; extremely springy, and springless and dead; wonderfully strong, and very weak; conducting heat and electricity easily, and again offering great resistance to their passage; here welding readily, there incapable of welding; here very infusible, there melting with relative ease. The coincidence that so indispensable a thing should also be so abundant, that an iron-needing man should be set on an iron-cored globe, certainly suggests design. The indispensableness of such abundant things as air, water and light is readily explained by saying that their very abundance has evolved a creature dependent on them. But the indispensable qualities of iron did not shape man’s evolution, because its great usefulness did not arise until historic times, or even, as in case of magnetism, until modern times.

— "Iron and Steel", 1911

== Personal life ==
Howe was born in Boston, Massachusetts, on March 2, 1848. He married Fannie Gay in 1874. He died on May 14, 1922, after a year-long illness.

== Honors ==
- 1895 Bessemer Gold Medal of the Iron and Steel Institute
- 1895: Elliott Cresson Medal of the Franklin Institute of Philadelphia
- 1917 John Fritz Gold Medal of the American Association of Engineering Societies (then called the United Engineering Societies)

Howe was elected a member of the American Academy of Arts and Sciences in 1891, elected president of the American Institute of Mining Engineers in 1893, elected to the American Philosophical Society in 1897, and made chairman of the American Society for Testing Materials in 1900. He became a member of the National Research Council in 1918 and became its chairman in 1919.

== Bibliography ==
- George K. Burgess, "Biographical Memoir Henry Marion Howe 1848-1922", National Academy of Sciences 21, 7th memoir full text, presented 1923, published 1927.
