= Julia Ward Howe =

American abolitionist, social activist, and poet (1819–1910)

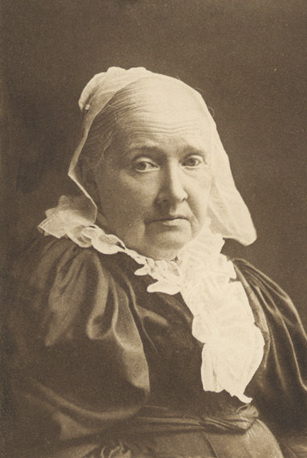
- Howe in 1895
- Born: Julia Ward; May 27, 1819; New York City, U.S.
- Died: October 17, 1910 (aged 91); Portsmouth, Rhode Island, U.S.
- Spouse: Samuel Gridley Howe (m. 1843; died 1876)
- Children: Julia; Florence; Henry; Laura; Maud; Samuel Jr.
- Father: Samuel Ward III
- Relatives: Samuel Cutler Ward (brother)

Signature
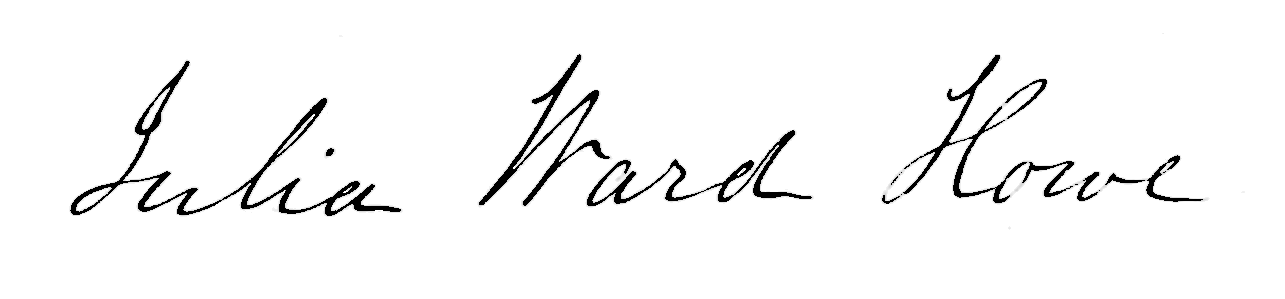

Julia Ward Howe (/haʊ/ HOW; May 27, 1819 – October 17, 1910) was an American author and poet, known for writing the "Battle Hymn of the Republic" as new lyrics to the song "John Brown's Body," and the original 1870 pacifist Mothers' Day Proclamation. She was also an abolitionist and a social activist, particularly for women's suffrage.

== Early life and education ==
Julia Ward was born in New York City on May 27, 1819. She was the fourth of seven children. Her father Samuel Ward III was a Wall Street stockbroker, banker, and strict Calvinist Episcopalian. Her mother was the poet Julia Rush Cutler Ward, related to Francis Marion, the "Swamp Fox" of the American Revolution. She died during childbirth when Howe was five.

Howe was educated by private tutors and schools for young ladies until she was sixteen. Her eldest brother, Samuel Cutler Ward, traveled in Europe and brought home a private library. She had access to these books, many contradicting the Calvinistic view. Though social, she became well-read, as well as scholarly. She met, because of her father's status as a successful banker, Charles Dickens, Charles Sumner, and Margaret Fuller.

Her brother, Sam, married into the Astor family, allowing him great social freedom that he shared with his sister. The siblings were cast into mourning with the death of their father in 1839, the death of their brother, Henry, and the deaths of Samuel's wife, Emily, and their newborn child.

== Personal life ==
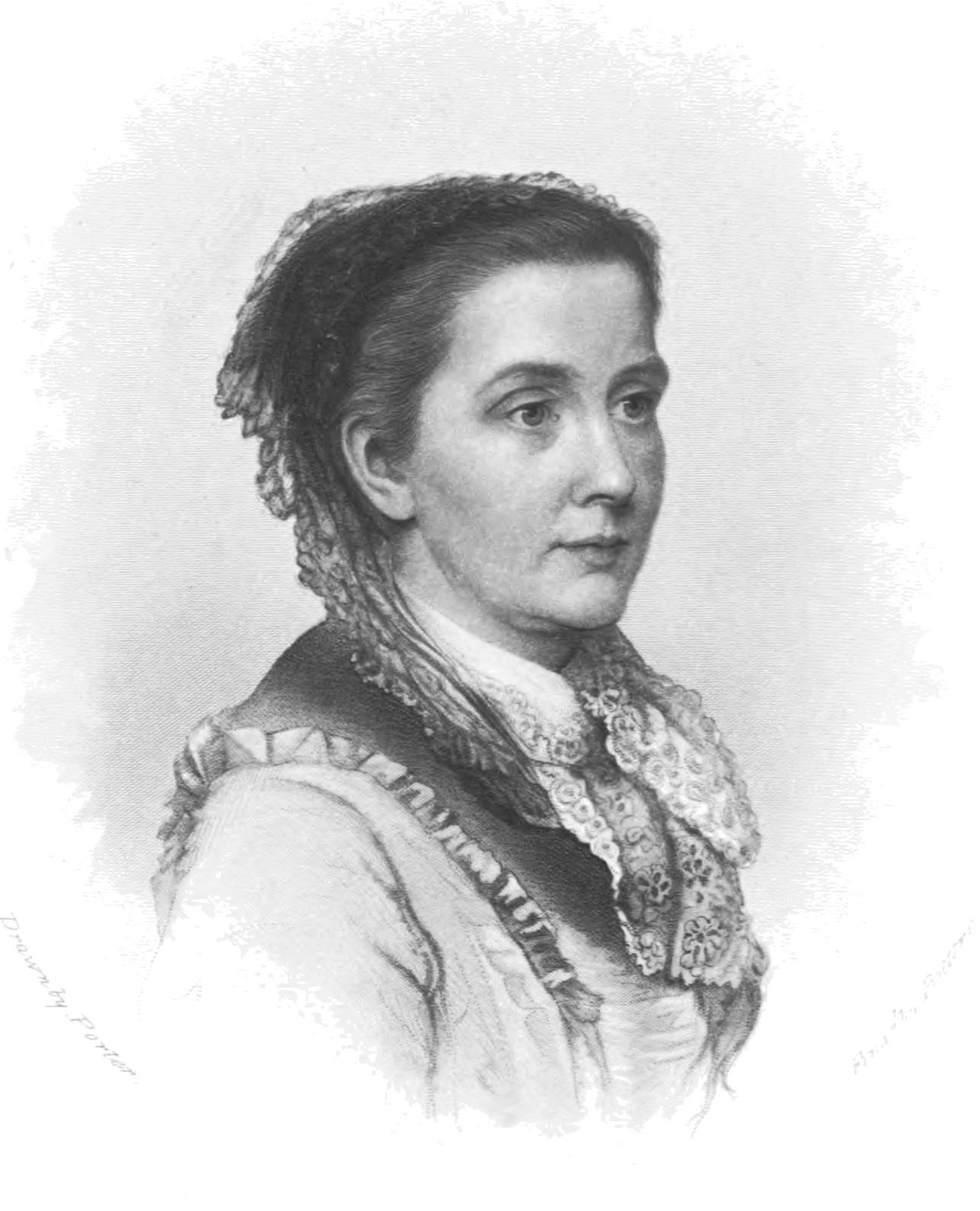
Julia Ward Howe. Created 1887

Though raised an Episcopalian, Julia became a Unitarian by 1841. In Boston, Ward met Samuel Gridley Howe, a physician and reformer who had founded the Perkins School for the Blind. Howe had courted her, but he had shown an interest in her sister Louisa. In 1843, they married despite their eighteen-year age difference. She gave birth to their first child while honeymooning in Europe. She bore their last child in December 1859 at the age of forty. They had six children: Julia Romana Howe (1844–1886), Florence Marion Howe (1845–1922), Henry Marion Howe (1848–1922), Laura Elizabeth Howe (1850–1943), Maud Howe (1855–1948), and Samuel Gridley Howe Jr. (1859–1863). Howe was an aunt of novelist Francis Marion Crawford. Ward’s marriage to Howe was troublesome for her. He did not approve of her writing and did everything he could to disrupt her creative efforts.

Howe raised her children in South Boston, while her husband pursued his advocacy work. She hid her unhappiness with their marriage, earning the nickname "the family champagne" from her children. She made frequent visits to Gardiner, Maine, where she stayed at "The Yellow House," a home built originally in 1814 and later home to her daughter Laura.

Howe was a vegetarian in the late 1830s but was eating meat again by 1843. In 1852, the Howes bought a "country home" with 4.7 acres of land in Portsmouth, Rhode Island, which they called "Oak Glen." They continued to maintain homes in Boston and Newport, but spent several months each year at Oak Glen.

== Career ==
=== Writing ===
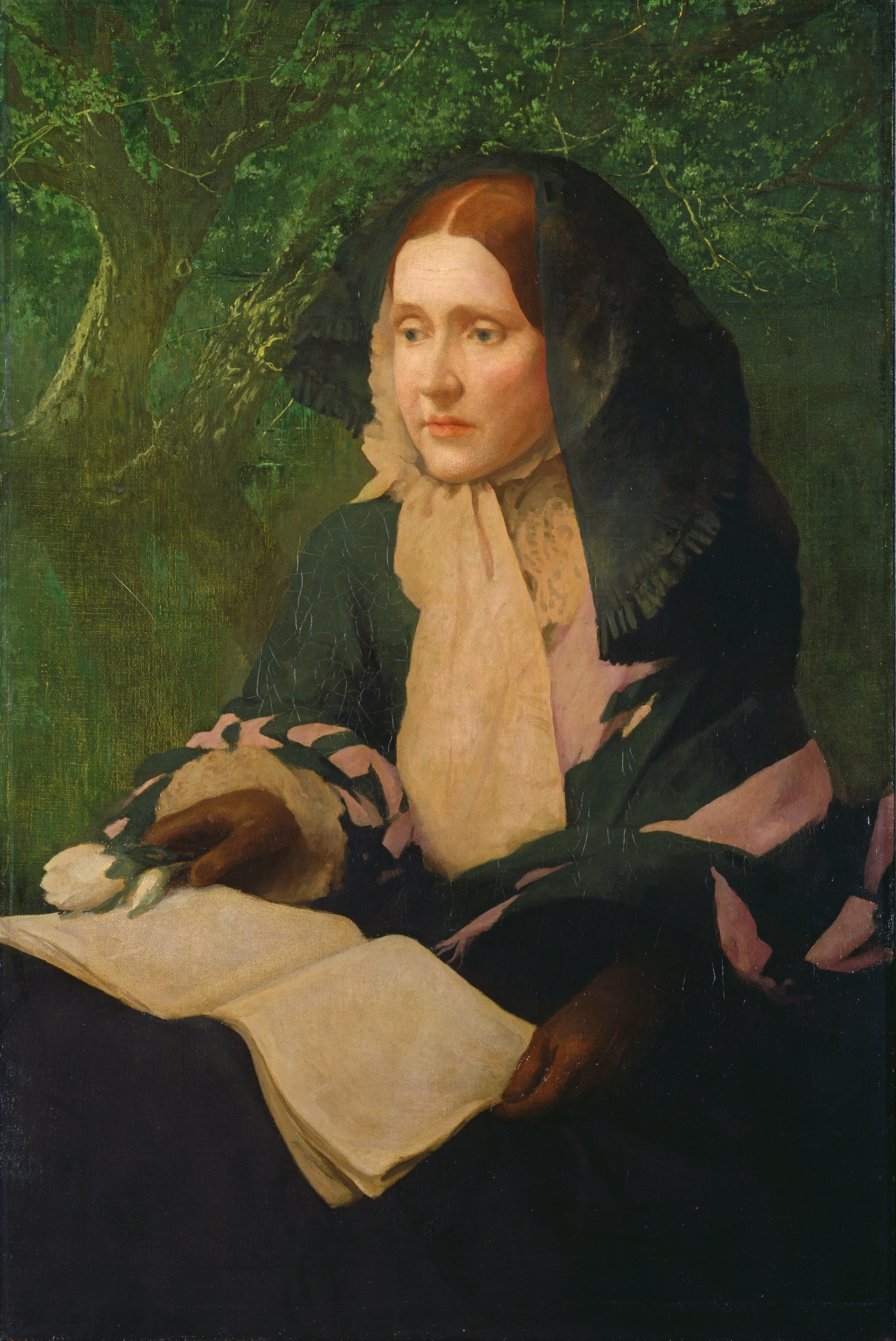
Portrait of Julia Ward Howe, by John Elliott, 1925

She attended lectures, studied foreign languages, and wrote plays and dramas. Prior to her marriage, Howe had published essays on Goethe, Schiller and Lamartine in the New York Review and Theological Review. Her first volume of poetry, Passion-Flowers was published anonymously in 1853. The book collected personal poems and was written without the knowledge of her husband, who was then editing the Free Soil newspaper The Commonwealth. Her second anonymous collection, Words for the Hour, appeared in 1857. She went on to write plays such as Leonora, The World's Own, and Hippolytus. These works all contained allusions to her stultifying marriage.

Unpublished during her lifetime but certainly part of her twenty-first century legacy is a fragmentary novel, The Hermaphrodite, assembled from manuscript fragments in Harvard's Houghton Library by Gary Williams and published in 2004 by the University of Nebraska Press.

She went on trips including several for missions. In 1860, she published A Trip to Cuba, which told of her 1859 trip. It had generated outrage from William Lloyd Garrison, an abolitionist, for its derogatory view of Black people. Howe believed it was right to free the slaves but did not believe in racial equality. Several letters on High Newport society were published in the New York Tribune in 1860, as well.

Howe being a published author troubled her husband greatly, especially because her poems often critiqued women's roles as wives, her own marriage, and women's place in society. Their marriage problems escalated to the point where they separated in 1852. Samuel, when he became her husband, had also taken complete control of her estate income. After her husband's death in 1876, she found that most of her money had been lost in his bad investments.

Howe's writing and social activism were greatly shaped by her upbringing and married life. Much study has gone into her difficult marriage and how it influenced her work as a writer and an activist.

=== Politics ===
In the early 1870s, Howe was nominated by Massachusetts governor William Claflin as justice of the peace. However, there were uncertainties surrounding her appointment, as many believed women were not fit to hold office. In 1871, the Massachusetts Supreme Court made the decision that women could not hold any judicial offices without explicit authorization from the legislature, thereby nullifying Howe's appointment to justice of the peace. This led to activists petitioning for legislation allowing women to hold office, separate from legislating women's suffrage. Women's supporters believed that petitioning for officeholding before petitioning for a women's suffrage amendment would expedite women's involvement in politics.

=== Social activism ===
The Battle Hymn of the Republic
"The Battle Hymn of the Republic", performed by Frank C. Stanley, Elise Stevenson, and a mixed quartet in 1908

The Battle Hymn of the Republic
"The Battle Hymn of the Republic", modern arrangement arranged by Eric Richards, performed by United States Air Force Band Airmen of Note

She was inspired to write "The Battle Hymn of the Republic" after she and her husband visited Washington, D.C., and met Abraham Lincoln at the White House in November 1861. During the trip, her friend James Freeman Clarke suggested she write new words to the song "John Brown's Body", which she did on November 19. The song was set to William Steffe's already existing music and Howe's version was first published in the Atlantic Monthly in February 1862. It quickly became one of the most popular songs of the Union during the American Civil War.

Howe produced eleven issues of the literary magazine, Northern Lights, in 1867. That same year she wrote about her travels to Europe in From the Oak to the Olive. After the war, she focused her activities on the causes of pacifism and women's suffrage. By 1868, Julia's husband no longer opposed her involvement in public life, so she decided to become active in reform. She helped found the New England Women's Club and the New England Woman Suffrage Association. She served as president for nine years beginning in 1868. In 1869, she became co-leader with Lucy Stone of the American Woman Suffrage Association. Then, in 1870, she became president of the New England Women's Club.

After her husband's death in 1876, Howe focused more on her interest in reform. In 1877 Howe was one of the founders of the Women's Educational and Industrial Union in Boston. Unlike many other suffragists at the time, Howe supported the final version of the Fifteenth Amendment, which extended the right to vote to African Americans, but omitted the inclusion of language barring discrimination against women. Her reason for supporting this version of the Fifteenth Amendment was that "she viewed black men's suffrage as the priority."

In 1872, she became the editor of Woman's Journal, a widely-read suffragist magazine founded in 1870 by Lucy Stone and Henry B. Blackwell. She contributed to it for twenty years. That same year, she wrote her "Appeal to womanhood throughout the world", later known as the Mothers’ Day Proclamation, which asked women around the world to join for world peace. (See Category:Pacifist feminism.) She authored it soon after she evolved into a pacifist and an anti-war activist. In 1872, she asked that "Mothers' Day" be celebrated on June 2. Her efforts were not successful, and by 1893 she was wondering if July 4 could be remade into "Mothers' Day".

In 1874, she edited a coeducational defense titled Sex and Education. She wrote a collection about the places she lived in 1880 called Modern Society. In 1883, Howe published a biography of Margaret Fuller. Then, in 1885 she published another collection of lectures called Is Polite Society Polite? In 1899 she published her popular memoirs, Reminiscences. She continued to write until her death.

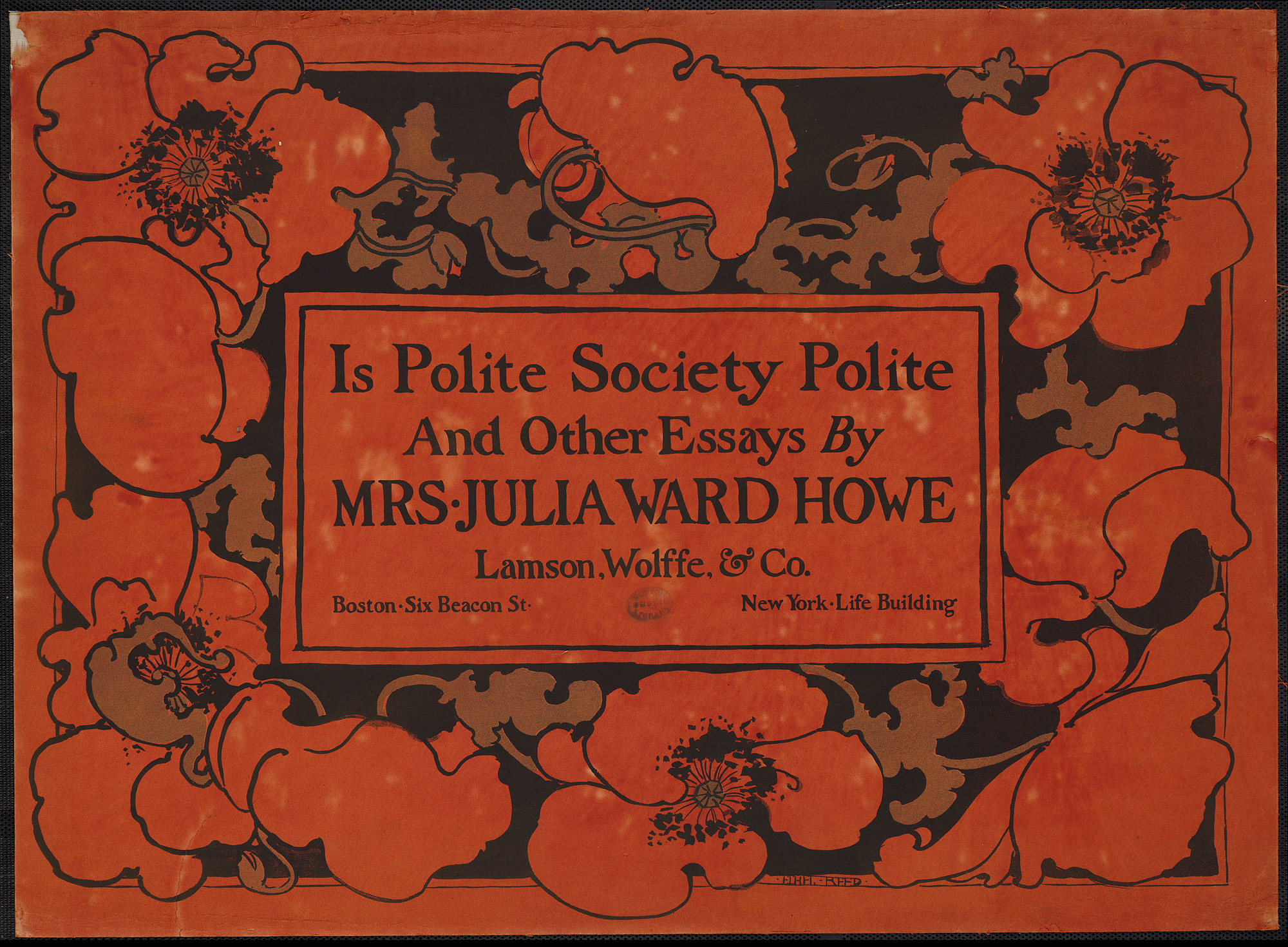
Is Polite Society Polite and Other Essays by Mrs. Julia Ward Howe

In 1881, Howe was elected president of the Association for the Advancement of Women. Around the same time, Howe went on a speaking tour of the Pacific coast and founded the Century Club of San Francisco. In 1890, she helped found the General Federation of Women's Clubs, to reaffirm the Christian values of frugality and moderation. From 1891 to 1893, she served as president for the second time of the Massachusetts Woman Suffrage Association. Until her death, she was president of the New England Woman Suffrage Association. From 1893 to 1898 she directed the General Federation of Women's Clubs, and headed the Massachusetts Federation of Women's Clubs. Howe spoke at the 1893 World's Parliament of Religions in Chicago reflecting on the question, What is Religion?. In 1908 Julia was the first woman to be elected to the American Academy of Arts and Letters, a society; its goal is to "foster, assist, and sustain excellence" in American literature, music, and art.

== Death and legacy ==
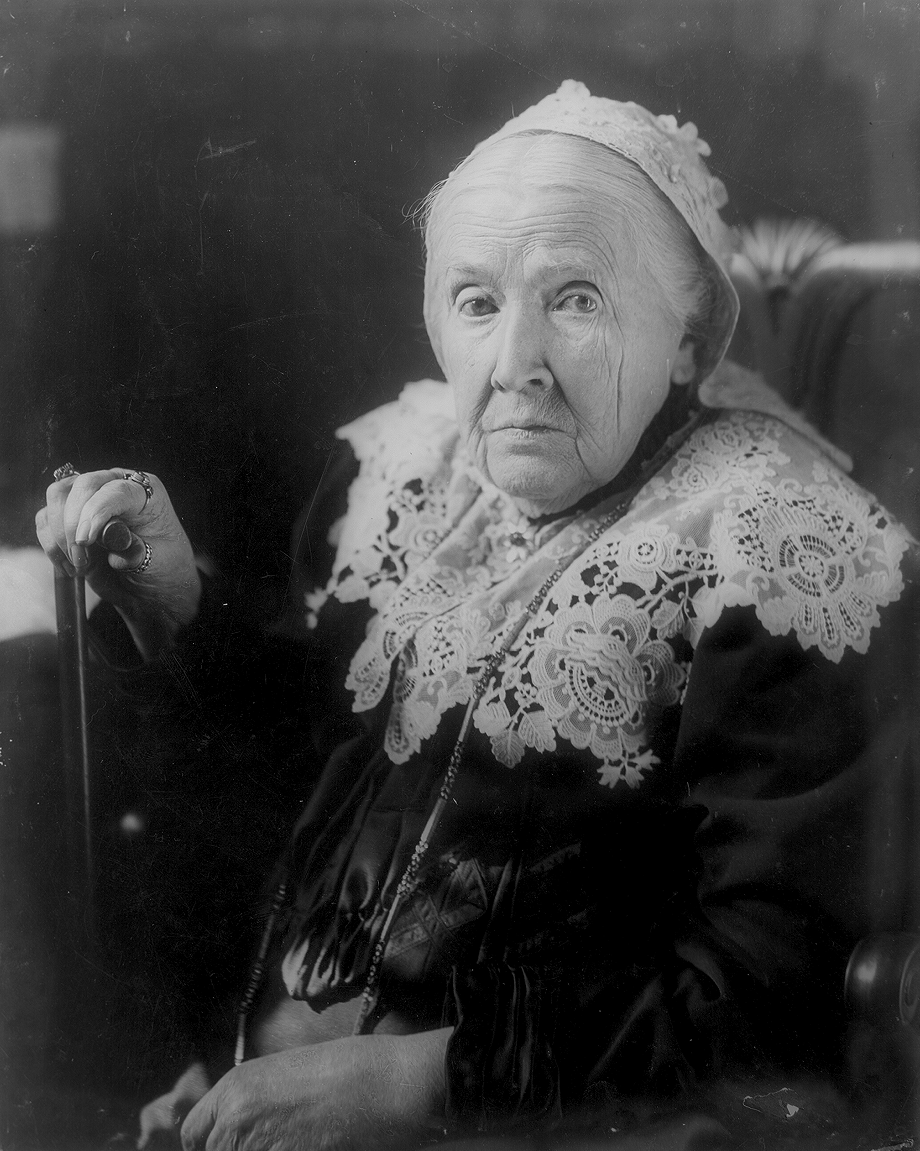
Howe in 1909

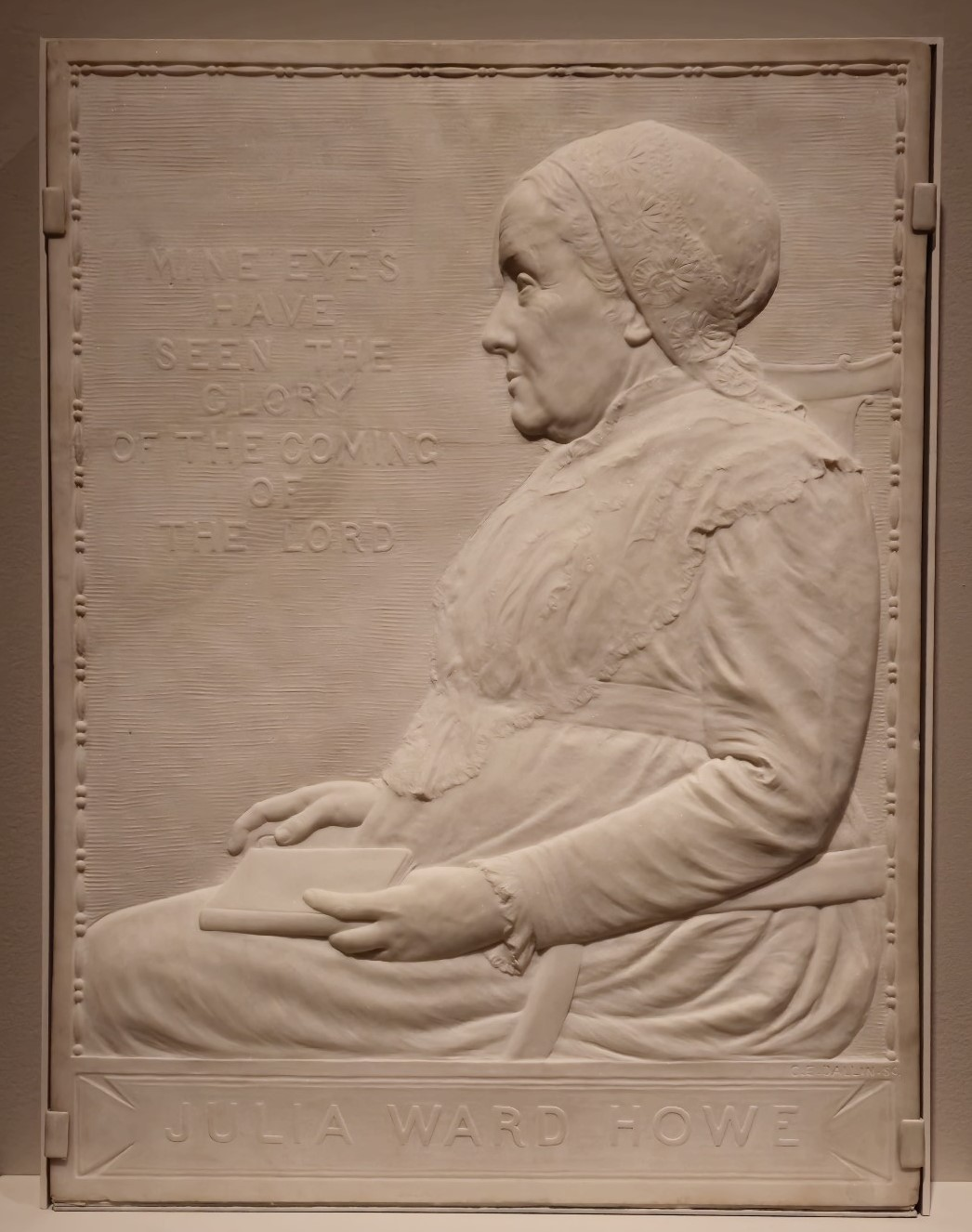
The 1913 bas-relief plaque of Howe by Cyrus Dallin

Howe died of pneumonia on October 17, 1910, at her Portsmouth home, Oak Glen at the age of 91. She is buried in the Mount Auburn Cemetery in Cambridge, Massachusetts. At her memorial service approximately 4,000 people sang "Battle Hymn of the Republic" as a sign of respect as it was the custom to sing that song at each of Julia's speaking engagements.

In 1912, the members of the New England Women's Club commissioned a marble bas-relief plaque of Howe in profile featuring the opening words of The Battle Hymn of the Republic by sculptor Cyrus Dallin. It was originally installed to the left wall of the then main hall of the Boston Museum of Fine Arts in 1913.

After her death, her children collaborated on a biography, published in 1916. It won the Pulitzer Prize for Biography.

In 1987, she was honored by the U.S. Postal Service with a 14¢ Great Americans series postage stamp.

Several buildings are associated with her name:

- The Julia Ward Howe School of Excellence in Chicago's Austin community is named in her honor.
- The Howe neighborhood in Minneapolis, Minnesota, was named for her.
- The Julia Ward Howe Academics Plus Elementary School in Philadelphia was named in her honor in 1913.
- Her Rhode Island home, Oak Glen, was added to the National Register of Historic Places in 1978.
- Her Boston home is a stop on the Boston Women's Heritage Trail.
- Julia Ward Howe Elementary School, located in Mount Lebanon, Pennsylvania.

== Ancestry ==
Ancestors of Julia Ward Howe

8. Samuel Ward Sr.
4. Samuel Ward Jr.
9. Anne Ray (1728-1770)
2. Samuel Ward III
10. William Greene Jr.
5. Phebe Greene (1760–1828)
11. Catharine Ray (1731-1794) (sister of 9)
1. Julia Ward Howe. (1819-1910)
12. John Cutler (1723–1805)
6. Benjamin Clark Cutler
13. Mart Clarke (1728-1800)
3. Julia Rush Cutler
14. Thomas Mitchell
7. Sarah Mitchell (1761–1836) of Waccamaw Plantation
15. Esther Marion

== Awards and honors ==
- January 28, 1908, at age 88, Howe became the first woman elected to the American Academy of Arts and Letters.
- 1970, inducted into the Songwriters Hall of Fame.
- In 1998, inducted into the National Women's Hall of Fame.

== Selected works ==
=== Poetry ===
- Passion-Flowers (1854)
- Words for the Hour (1857)
- From Sunset Ridge: Poems Old and New (1898)
- Later Lyrics (1866)
- At Sunset (published posthumously, 1910)

=== Other works ===
- The Hermaphrodite. Incomplete, but probably composed between 1846 and 1847. Published by University of Nebraska Press, 2004
- From the Oak to the Olive (travel writing, 1868)
- Modern Society (essays, 1881)
- Margaret Fuller (Marchesa Ossoli) (biography, 1883)
- Woman's work in America (1891)
- Is Polite Society Polite? (essays, 1895)
- Reminiscences: 1819–1899 (autobiography, 1899)

== See also ==
- List of peace activists
- List of suffragists and suffragettes
- List of women's rights activists
- Timeline of women's suffrage
- Ann Jarvis
- Gardiner, Maine, Howe's home for many years
- Samuel Gridley and Julia Ward Howe House
