= Samuel Gridley Howe =

American educator and abolitionist (1801–1876)

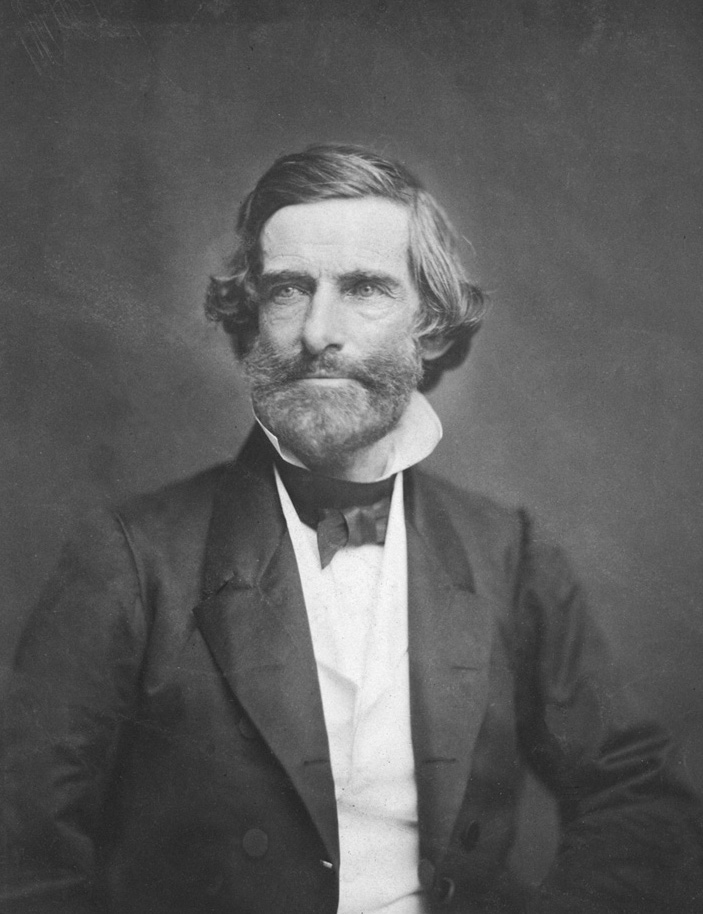
- Born: November 10, 1801; Boston, Massachusetts, U.S.
- Died: January 9, 1876 (aged 74); Massachusetts, U.S.
- Burial place: Mount Auburn Cemetery
- Education: Brown University (AB); Harvard University (MD)
- Occupations: Physician, abolitionist
- Spouse: Julia Ward (m. 1843)
- Children: Julia; Florence; Henry; Laura; Maud; Samuel Jr.

Samuel Gridley Howe (November 10, 1801 – January 9, 1876) was an American medical doctor, abolitionist, and advocate of education for the blind. He organized and was the first director of the Perkins Institution. In 1824, he went to Greece to serve as a surgeon in the Greek War of Independence. He arranged for support for refugees and brought many Greek children back to Boston with him for their education.

An abolitionist, Howe was one of three men appointed by the Secretary of War to the American Freedmen's Inquiry Commission, to investigate conditions of freedmen in the South since the Emancipation Proclamation and recommend how they could be aided in their transition to freedom. In addition to traveling to the South, Howe traveled to Canada West (now Ontario, Canada), where thousands of former slaves had escaped to freedom and established new lives. He interviewed freedmen as well as government officials in Canada.

== Early life and education ==
Howe was born on Pearl Street in Boston, Massachusetts, on November 10, 1801. His father, Joseph Neals Howe, was a ship-owner and rope manufacturer in Boston. The business was prosperous until he supplied the U.S. Government with ropes during the war of 1812 and was never paid. His mother Patty (Gridley) Howe was considered to be one of the most beautiful women of her day. Samuel Gridley Howe's grandfather, Edward Compton Howe, was one of the patriots at the Boston Tea Party.

Howe was educated at Boston Latin School, where he was cruelly treated and even beaten, according to his daughter. Laura (Howe) Richards later wrote: "So far as I can remember, my father had no pleasant memories of his school days."

Boston in the early nineteenth century was a hotbed of political foment. Howe's father was a Democrat who considered Harvard University a den of Federalists, refusing to allow his sons to enter the university. Accordingly, Howe's father had him enrolled at Brown University in 1818. He engaged in many practical jokes and other high jinks and, years later, Howe told his children that he regretted that he hadn't more seriously applied himself to his studies. One of his classmates, Alexis Caswell, future doctor and president of Brown University described Howe as the following: "he showed mental capabilities which would naturally fit him for fine scholarship. His mind was quick, versatile, and inventive. I do not think he was deficient in logical power, but the severer studies did not seem to be congenial to him." After graduating from Brown in 1821, Howe attended Harvard Medical School, taking his degree in 1824.

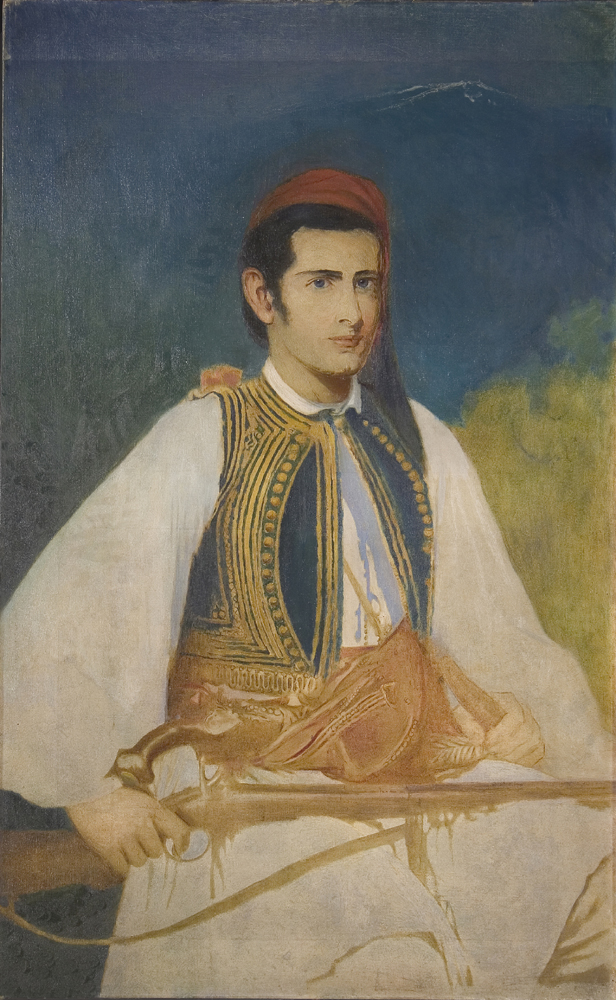
Samuel Gridley Howe painted in the dress of a Greek soldier by John Elliott. Elliott married Howe's daughter Maud Howe.

== Greek Revolution ==
Howe did not remain in Massachusetts for long after graduating. In 1824, shortly after Howe was certified to practice medicine, he became fired by enthusiasm for the Greek Revolution and the example of his idol, Lord Byron. Howe fled the memory of an unhappy love affair and sailed for Greece, where he joined the Greek army as a surgeon.

In Greece, his services were not confined to the duties of a surgeon but were of a more military nature. Howe's bravery, enthusiasm, and ability as a commander, as well as his humanity, won him the title "the Lafayette of the Greek Revolution." Howe returned to the United States in 1827 to raise funds and supplies to help alleviate the famine and suffering in Greece. Howe's fervid appeals enabled him to collect about $60,000, which he spent on provisions, clothing, and the establishment of a relief depot for refugees near Aegina. He later formed another colony for exiles on the Isthmus of Corinth. Afterward, Howe wrote an account of the revolt, Historical Sketch of the Greek Revolution, which was published in 1828. He brought back with him Lord Byron's helmet, which he later had on display in his house in Boston.

Samuel Gridley Howe brought many Greek refugee children back with him to the United States to educate them. Two who later gained prominence were John Celivergos Zachos, who became an abolitionist and activist for women's rights, and Christophorus P. Castanis. Castanis survived the Chios massacre. He later wrote a memoir about these events, The Greek Exile, Or, a Narrative of the Captivity and Escape of Christophorus Plato Castanis (1851). He mentioned both Dr. Howe and John Celivergos Zachos in this book.

Howe continued his medical studies in Paris. His enthusiasm for a republican form of government led him to take part in the July Revolution.

== Work for the blind ==
In 1831, Howe returned to the United States. Through his friend Dr. John Dix Fisher, a Boston physician who had started a movement there as early as 1826 to establish a school for the blind, he had learned of a similar school founded in Paris by Valentin Haüy. A committee organized by Fisher proposed to Howe that he direct establishing a New England Asylum for the Blind at Boston. He took up the project with characteristic ardor and set out at once for Europe to investigate the problem.

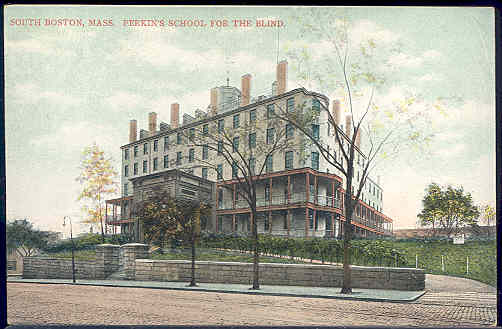
Perkins School, prior to 1915

In America, he met with supporters of the Polish Revolution and was chosen to take money to revolutionaries in Europe. Thus he had two missions: to learn about schools for the blind and, as chairman of the American-Polish Committee at Paris, to support the Polish revolutionaries. The Paris committee had been organized by J. Fenimore Cooper, S. F. B. Morse, and several other Americans living in the city. By that time, the Poles had been defeated by the Russians and Howe was to give money to the many, particularly officers, who did not want to return home. They were harassed by some people of neighboring countries, but were given political refuge and crossed over the Prussian border into Prussia. Howe undertook to distribute the supplies and funds personally. While in Berlin, he was arrested and imprisoned, but managed to destroy or hide the incriminating letters to Polish officers. After five weeks, he was released due to the intervention of the United States Minister at Paris.

Returning to Boston in July 1832, Howe began receiving a few blind children at his father's house in Pleasant Street. He gradually developed what became the noted Perkins Institution. In January 1833, the initial funds were spent, but so much progress had been shown that the legislature approved funding to the institution, later increased to $30,000 (~$1.04 million in 2024) a year. This was conditioned on its giving free education to twenty poor blind students from the state. Funds were also donated from supporters in Salem and Boston. Colonel Thomas Handasyd Perkins, a prominent Boston trader in slaves, furs, and opium, donated his mansion and grounds in Pearl Street as a location for the school in perpetuity. This building was later found unsuitable, and Colonel Perkins agreed to its sale. In 1839 the institution was moved to the former Mount Washington House Hotel in South Boston. It was known as the Perkins Institution and Massachusetts Asylum (since 1877, School for the Blind).

Howe was director, and the life and soul of the school; he opened a printing-office and organized a fund for printing for the blind — the first done in the United States. He was a ceaseless promoter of their work. Through him, the Institution became one of the intellectual centers of American philanthropy, and by degrees obtained more and more financial support. He started the first circulating library in Braille. In 1837, Howe admitted Laura Bridgman, a young deaf-blind girl who later became a teacher at the school. She became famous as the first known deaf-blind person to be successfully educated in the United States. Howe taught Bridgman himself. Within a few years of attendance at Perkins Institution, she learned the manual alphabet and how to write.

Howe originated many improvements in teaching methods, as well as in the process of printing books in Braille. Besides acting as superintendent of the Perkins Institution to the end of his life, he was instrumental in establishing numerous institutions of a similar character throughout the country.

== Marriage and family ==
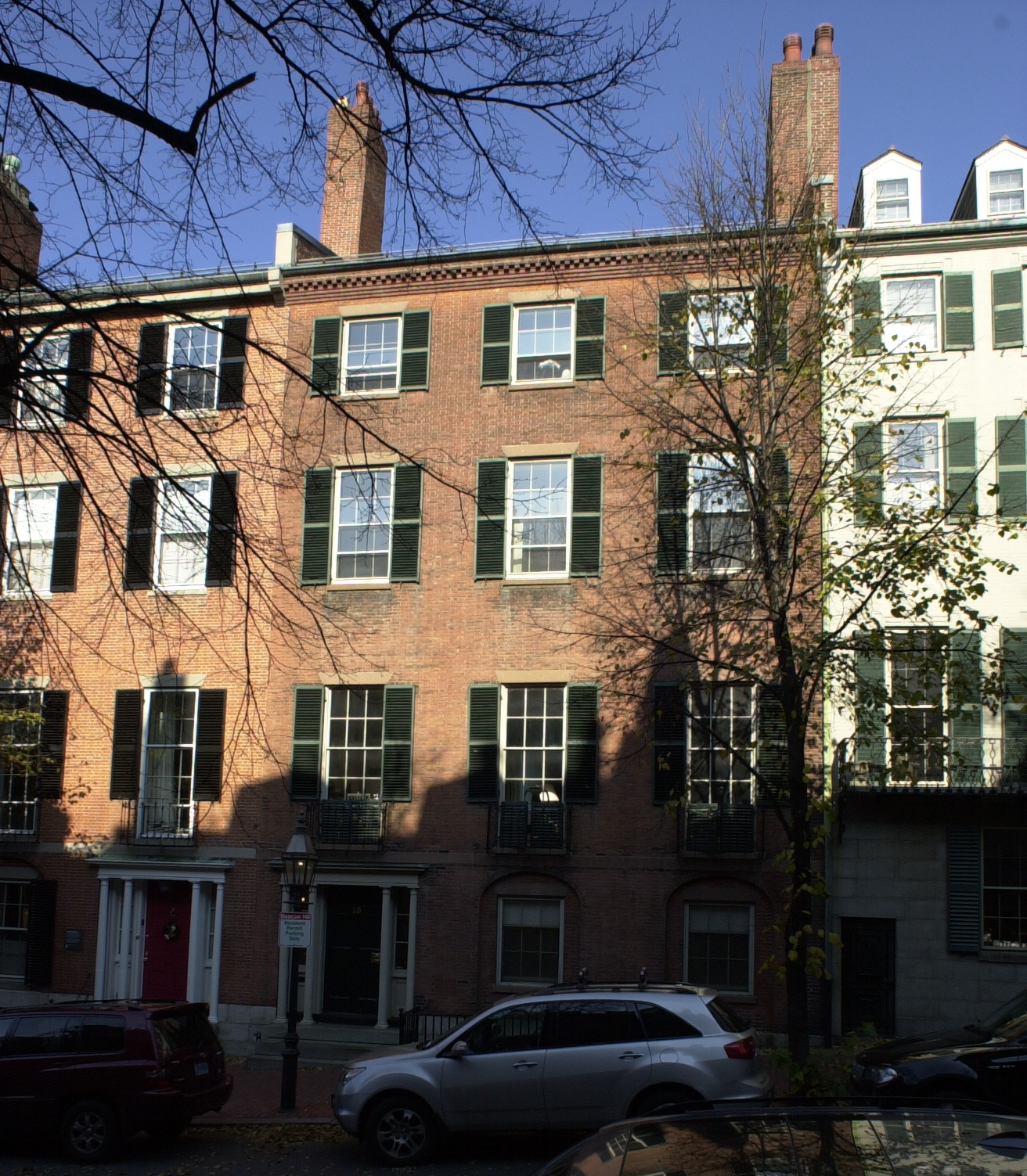
Between 1863 and 1866, Samuel Gridley and Julia Ward Howe lived at 13 Chestnut Street in the Beacon Hill neighborhood of Boston.

On April 23, 1843, at the age of 41, Howe married the younger Julia Ward, a daughter of wealthy New York banker Samuel Ward III and Julia Rush (Cutler) Ward. She was an ardent supporter of abolitionism and was later active in the cause of woman's suffrage. Ward composed the "Battle Hymn of the Republic" during the American Civil War.

They had a passionate and stormy marriage. Julia wrote in her diary of Howe (whom she referred to as "Chev"):

Chev is one of the characters based upon opposition. While I always seem to work for an unseen friend, he always sees an armed adversary and nerves himself accordingly. So all our lives turn on what I may call moral or personal fiction ...

At one point Samuel requested a legal separation, but Julia refused. Many of their arguments centered on Julia's desire to have a career apart from motherhood. While Howe was in many ways progressive by the standards of the day, he did not support the idea of married women having any work other than that of wife and mother. He believed that Julia's proper place was in the home.

The couple had six children: Julia Romana Howe (1844–1886), who married Michael Anagnos, a Greek scholar who succeeded Howe as director of the Perkins Institute; Florence Marion Howe (1845–1922), a Pulitzer Prize-winning author, who wrote a well-known treatise on manners and married David Prescott Hall, a lawyer; Henry Marion Howe (1848–1922), a metallurgist who lived in New York; Laura Elizabeth Howe (1850–1943), also a Pulitzer Prize-winning author, who married Henry Richards and lived in Maine; Maud Howe (1854–1948), a Pulitzer Prize-winning author, who married John Elliott, an English muralist and illustrator; and Samuel Gridley Howe Jr. (1859–1863), who died at age three.

Laura and Florence were closest to their father and defended his opposition to Julia's activities outside the home. Florence later took up her mother's mantle as a committed suffragette, making public speeches on the subject and writing the book, Julia Ward Howe and the Woman Suffrage Movement (1913).

== Antislavery activities ==
Howe entered publicly into the antislavery struggle for the first time in 1846 when, as a "Conscience Whig", he was an unsuccessful candidate for Congress against Robert C. Winthrop. Howe was one of the founders of an antislavery newspaper, the Boston Daily Commonwealth, which he edited (1851–1853) with the assistance of his wife Julia Ward Howe. He was a prominent member of the Kansas Committee in Massachusetts.

With Franklin Benjamin Sanborn, George Luther Stearns, Theodore Parker, and Gerrit Smith, he was interested in the plans of abolitionist John Brown. Although he disapproved of the attack upon Harpers Ferry, Howe had funded John Brown's work as a member of the Secret Six. After Brown's arrest, Howe temporarily fled to Canada to escape prosecution.

According to later accounts by Howe's daughter, Florence Hall, the Howes' South Boston home was a stop on the Underground Railroad. This is uncertain, but it is known that Howe vehemently opposed the Fugitive Slave Law of 1850, which required law enforcement even in free states to support efforts to catch fugitive slaves. Two incidents clearly demonstrate this. In May 1854, Howe, along with Thomas Wentworth Higginson, Theodore Parker, and other abolitionists, stormed Faneuil Hall in order to try to free a captured refugee slave, Anthony Burns. Burns was going to be shipped back to his slave owner in Virginia in accordance with the Fugitive Slave Law. The abolitionists hoped to rescue Burns from that fate. Howe declared outside the hall that "No man's freedom is safe until all men are free." Shortly afterward the abolitionists stormed the hall, breaking through the door with a battering ram. A deputy officer was murdered in the ensuing fracas. Federal troops suppressed the attempted takeover, and Burns was returned to Virginia. The men did not abandon Burns, however. Within a year of his capture, they had raised enough money to purchase Burns's freedom from his slave owner.

In October 1854, with the help of Capt. Austin Bearse and his brother, Howe rescued an escaped slave who had entered Boston Harbor from Jacksonville, Florida, as a stowaway aboard the brig Cameo. Violating the Fugitive Slave Act, the Boston Vigilance Committee helped the man evade slave-catchers and reach freedom.

In 1863 during the American Civil War, Howe was appointed to the American Freedmen's Inquiry Commission, and traveled both to the Deep South and to Canada to investigate the condition of emancipated slaves. Freedmen in Canada had often reached it via the Underground Railroad. Life in Canada wasn't free from the bigotry that Freedmen and women rewrote for the northern states as well as the South, but Howe found that their lives as free people were much improved. He noted that they were enfranchised and their rights protected by the government. They could earn a living, marry, and attend school and church out of reach of slave-catchers. He published an account of his interviews and experiences, The Refugees from Slavery in Canada West (1864). He submitted his report to the Secretary of War, and it became part of the commission's material for Congress. It contributed to passage of the law establishing the Freedmen's Bureau, considered needed to aid the Southern freedmen in transition.

== Civil War and Reconstruction ==
During the American Civil War, Howe was one of the directors of the Sanitary Commission. Its goal was to raise funds to improve hygiene standards and prevent outbreaks of disease at Union camps. Because of the lack of sanitation, camps were breeding grounds for such illnesses as dysentery, typhoid, and malaria. In addition, the Commission provided supplies and medical services to troops.

At the close of the Civil War, Howe began to work with the Freedmen's Bureau. This extended his work as an abolitionist. The Freedmen's Bureau was to help house, feed, clothe, educate, and provide medical care to newly freed slaves in the South after the Civil War. In some instances, Bureau staff helped freedmen to locate and reunite with relatives who had either fled north or who had been sold away during slavery.

== Philanthropic activities ==
Howe also helped establish the Massachusetts School for Idiot and Feeble-Minded Youth, the Western Hemisphere's oldest publicly funded institution serving mentally disabled people. He founded the school in 1848 with a $2,500 (~$73,124 in 2024) appropriation from the Massachusetts Legislature. "Idiot" was at that time considered a polite term for individuals with mental and intellectual disabilities. Howe was successful in his attempt to educate mentally disabled people, but this led to other problems. Some commentators argued that those with disabilities did so well in schools such as Howe's that they should permanently reside there. Howe was opposed to this reasoning, arguing that mentally disabled people had rights and that segregating them from the rest of society would be detrimental.

In 1866, Howe gave the keynote address at the opening of the New York State Institution for the Blind at Batavia, New York. He shocked the audience by warning about the dangers of segregation based on disability:

We should be cautious about establishing such artificial communities ... for any children and youth; but more especially should we avoid them for those who have natural infirmity ... Such persons spring up sporadically in the community, and they should be kept diffused among sound and normal persons ... Surround insane and excitable persons with sane people and ordinary influences; vicious children with virtuous people and virtuous influences; blind children with those who see; mute children with those who speak; and the like ...

Howe founded the State Board of Charities of Massachusetts in 1863, the first board of the sort in the United States. He served as its chairman from that time until 1874.

Howe made a last trip to Greece in 1866, to carry relief to Cretan refugees during the Cretan Revolution.

== Final years and death ==
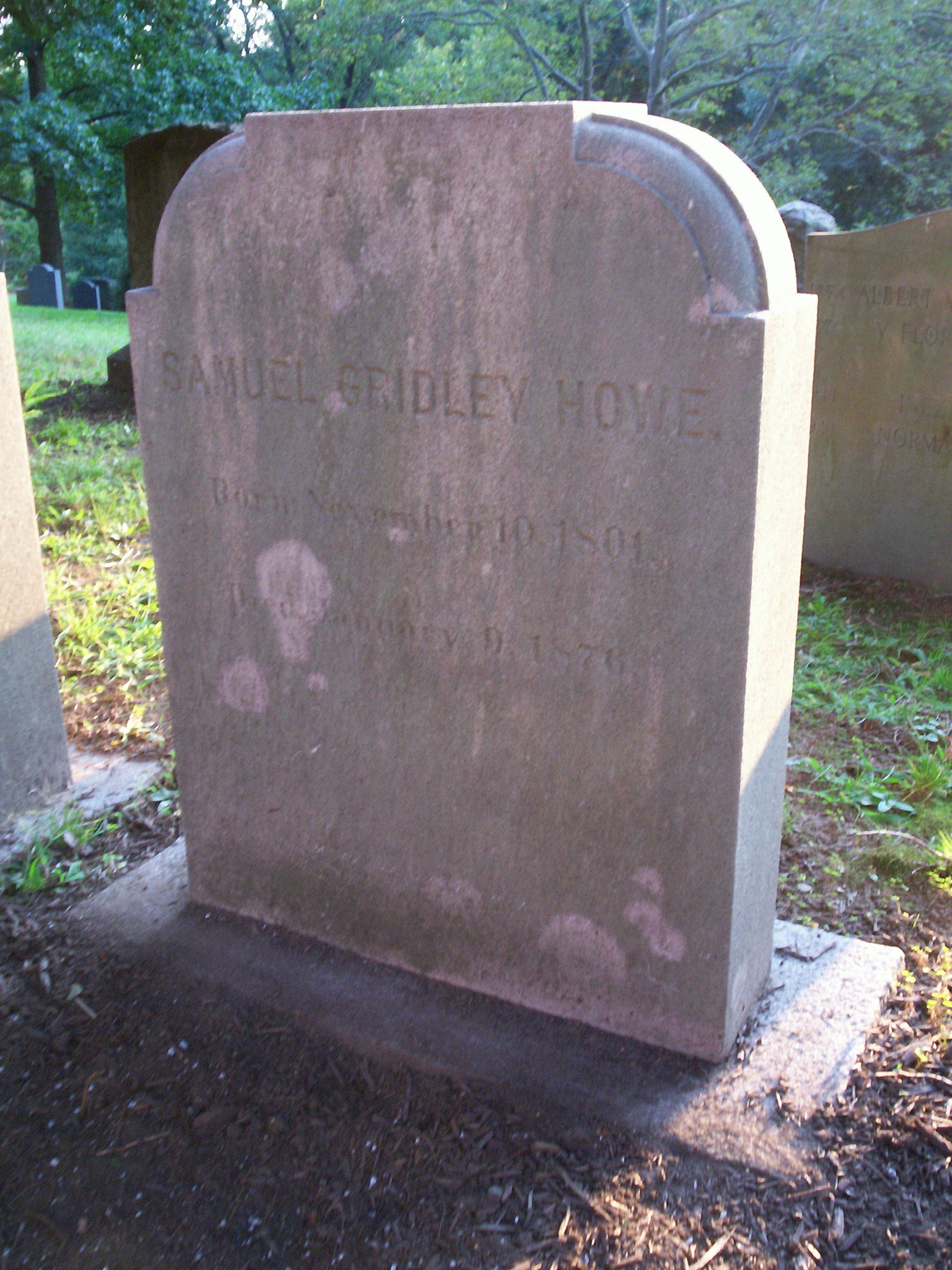
Grave of Samuel Gridley Howe in Mount Auburn Cemetery

Samuel Howe remained active and politically involved until the end of his life. In 1865, Howe openly advocated a progressive tax system, which he referred to as a "sliding scale of taxation proportionate to income." He said that the wealthy would resist this, but explained that the United States could not become a truly just society while the gap between rich and poor remained so cavernous. Emancipating the slaves and charity work alone were not enough, he insisted, to bridge the inequities,

so long as the labors and drudgery of the world is thrown actively upon one class, while another class is entirely exempt from it. There is a radical injustice in it. And injustice in society is like a rotten timber in the foundation of a house.

In 1870, he was a member of the commission sent by President Ulysses S. Grant to inquire into the practicability of the annexation of Santo Domingo. Grant wished to annex the country. He was opposed in this effort by Sen. Charles Sumner, a longtime friend and ally of Howe's. In the end, the committee sided with Sumner in opposition to the proposed annexation. Grant was so enraged at having his plans thwarted that he arranged to have Sumner removed from his chairmanship as head of the Senate Foreign Relations Committee.

Samuel Gridley Howe died on January 9, 1876. His remains are buried in Mount Auburn Cemetery in Cambridge, Massachusetts.

== Legacy and honors ==
The World War II Liberty Ship SS Samuel G. Howe was named in his honor.

Oliver Wendell Holmes Sr. wrote a "stirring lyric" about Howe, as did John Greenleaf Whittier ("The Hero").

== See also ==
- Jonathan Miller
- John Dennison Russ

== Bibliography ==
- Kastanes, Christophoros P. (1851). The Greek Exile, Or, a Narrative of the Captivity and Escape of Christophorus Plato Castanis.
