= Federal Street (Portland, Maine) =

Downtown street in Portland, Maine

Coordinates: 43.65979°N 70.25388°W

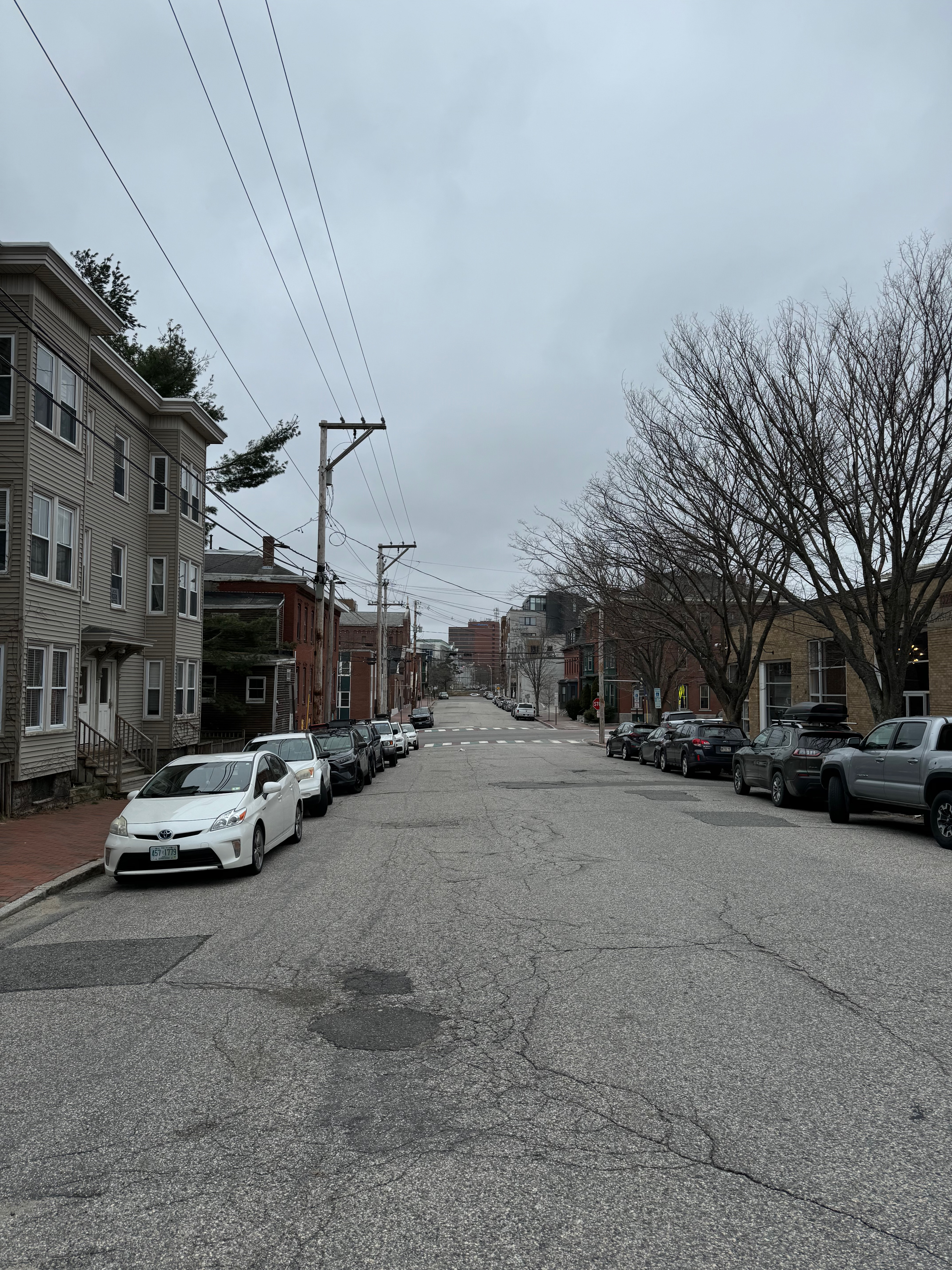
- Federal Street, looking southwest toward India Street
- Interactive map of Federal Street
- Length: 0.56 mi (0.90 km)
- Location: Portland, Maine, U.S.
- Northeast end: Mountfort Street
- Southwest end: Monument Square

Federal Street is a historic downtown street in Portland, Maine, United States. It runs for around 0.56 miles (0.90 km), from Monument Square in the southwest to Mountfort Street, at the foot of Munjoy Hill, in the northeast. Its middle section was wiped out by the widening of Franklin Street in 1967.

It forms the southern boundaries of both Lincoln Park (established in 1866) and Eastern Cemetery (1668). Both are listed on the National Register of Historic Places.

Upon its completion in 2023, The Casco, at 201 Federal Street, became the tallest residential building in Maine, at 204.5 feet (62.3 m), surpassing Franklin Towers. It is the third-tallest building in the state overall, behind the Agora Grand Event Center in Lewiston.

== Intersections ==
The following major streets intersect with Federal Street (from southwest to northeast):

- Monument Square
- Temple Street
- Exchange Street
- Market Street
- Pearl Street
- India Street
- Mountfort Street

== Notable addresses ==
Northeast to southwest:

- John Parrs House (c. 1847), 16 Federal Street
- 56–58 Federal Street
- St. Peter's Catholic Church (1929), 72 Federal Street
- 75 Federal Street
- 96 Federal Street (1867) and 100 Federal Street (1900), included in the India Street Historic District upon its formation
- Cumberland County Courthouse (1910), main entrance formerly on Federal Street, now on Newbury Street
- Edward T. Gignoux United States Courthouse (1908), 156 Federal Street (listed on the National Register of Historic Places). It was the first federal courthouse in Maine
- Printers' Exchange Block (1866), southeastern corner of Exchange Street and Federal Street
- Press Herald Building (1923), northeastern corner of Exchange Street and Federal Street
- The Casco, 201 Federal Street, tallest building in Portland and tallest residential building in Maine

The 1866 fire of Portland resulted in the loss of the Quaker Meeting House (built in 1796) and First Baptist Church (built in 1811).

The United States Hotel (built in 1803) formerly stood at the southwestern end of Federal Street, at Market Square (now Monument Square), behind the original city hall.

When the Cumberland County Courthouse was built in 1910, the Charles F. Jones Block, the Goodwin House and the Kennard House were demolished.

The previous construction at 201–205 Federal Street was owned by F. S. Waldron Realty Company.

The construction of Portland's Central Fire Station, on Congress Street, in 1925, resulted in the demolition of several Federal Street homes and businesses.

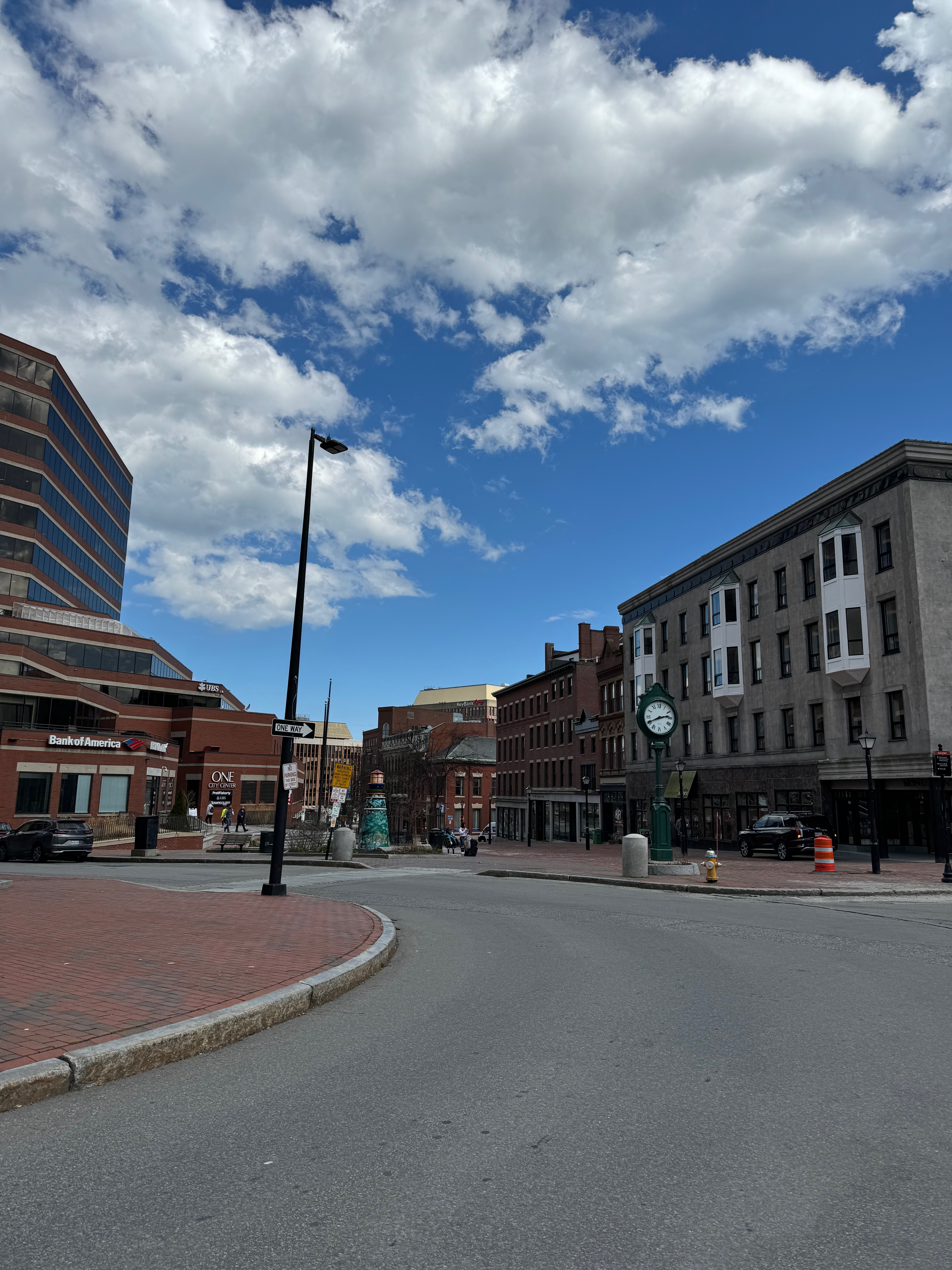
Federal Street begins on the left in this view from in front of One Monument Square

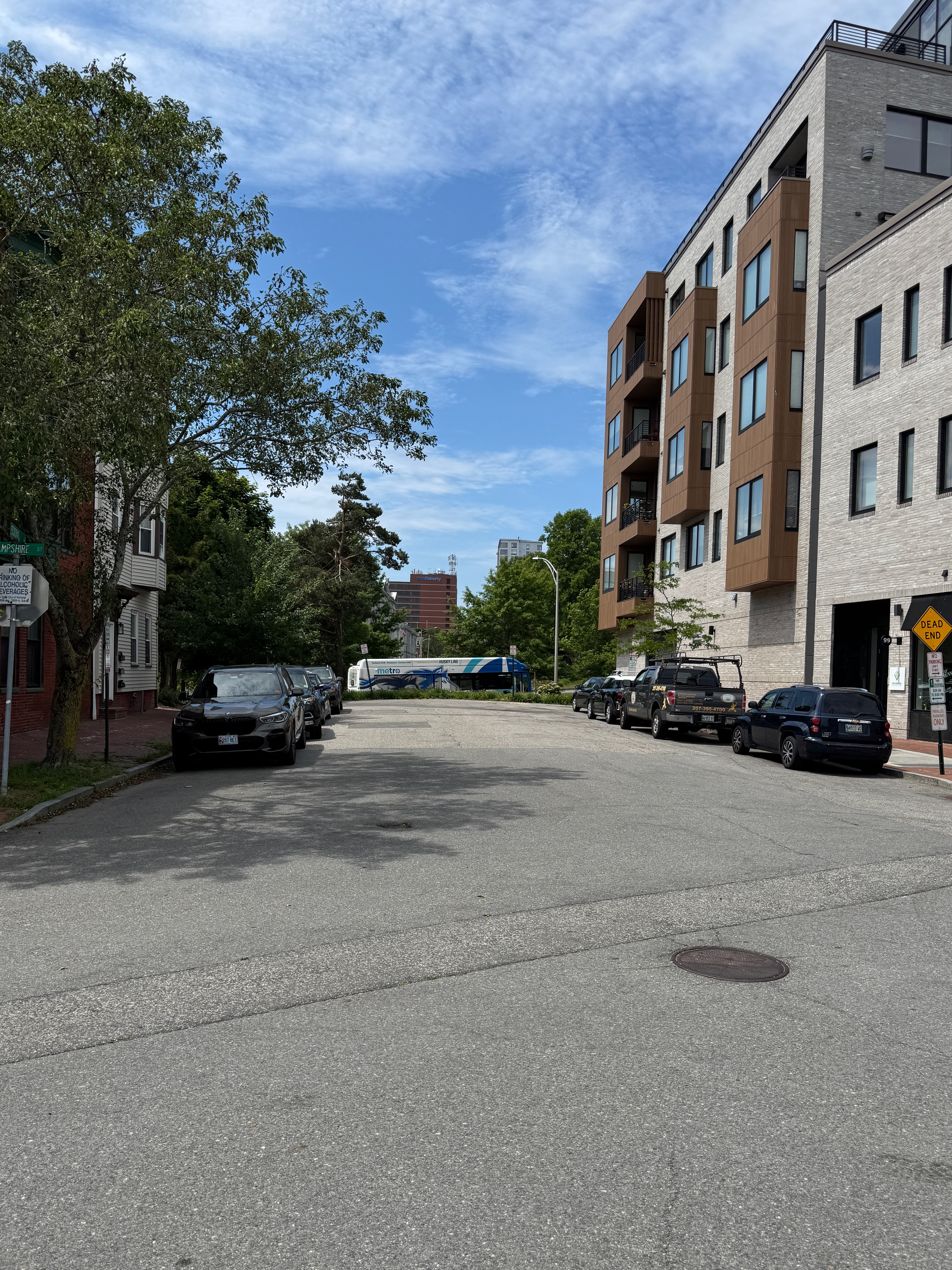
Franklin Street passing through the former mid-section of Federal Street

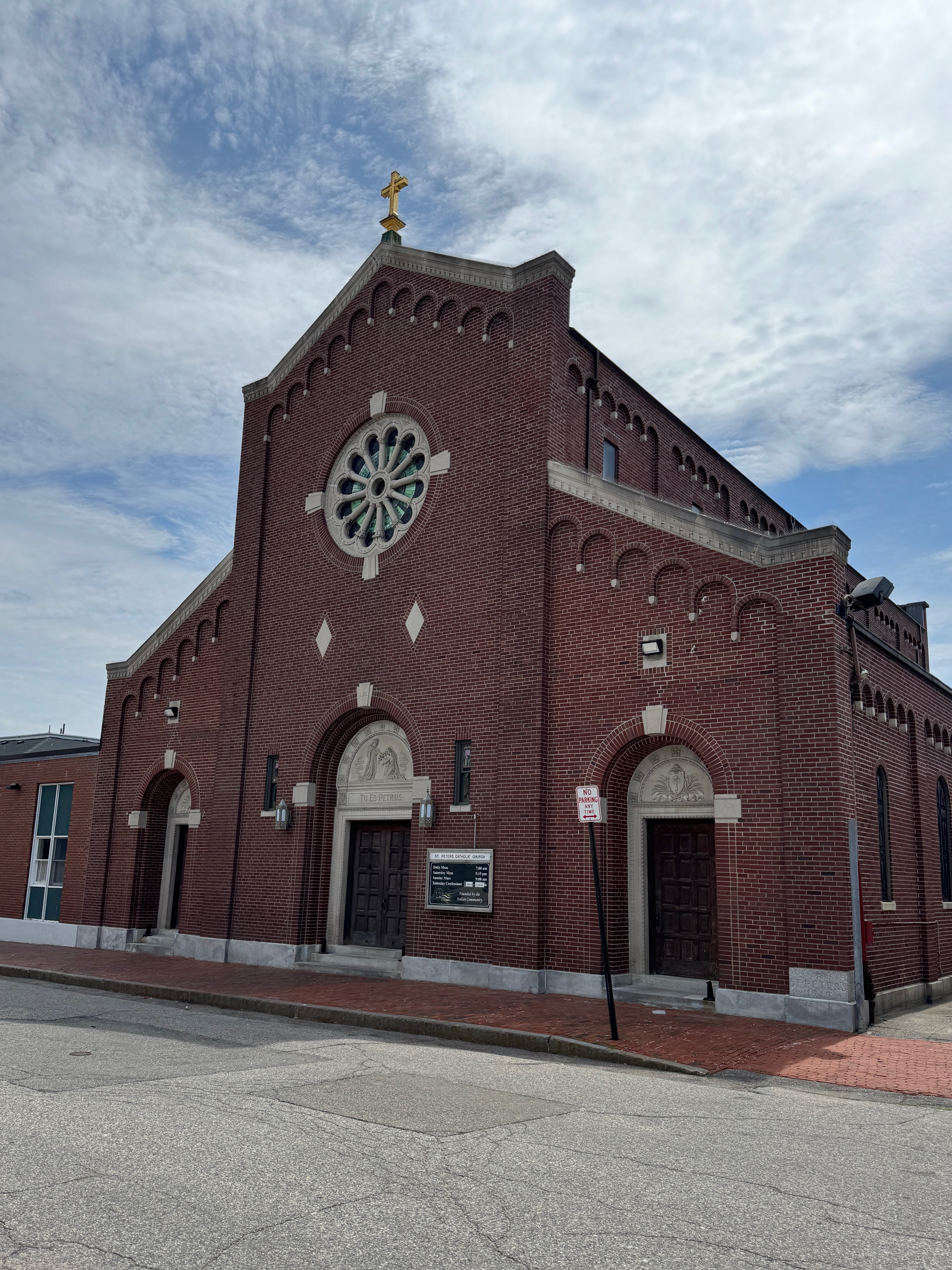
St. Peter Parish Church, 72 Federal Street, built in 1929

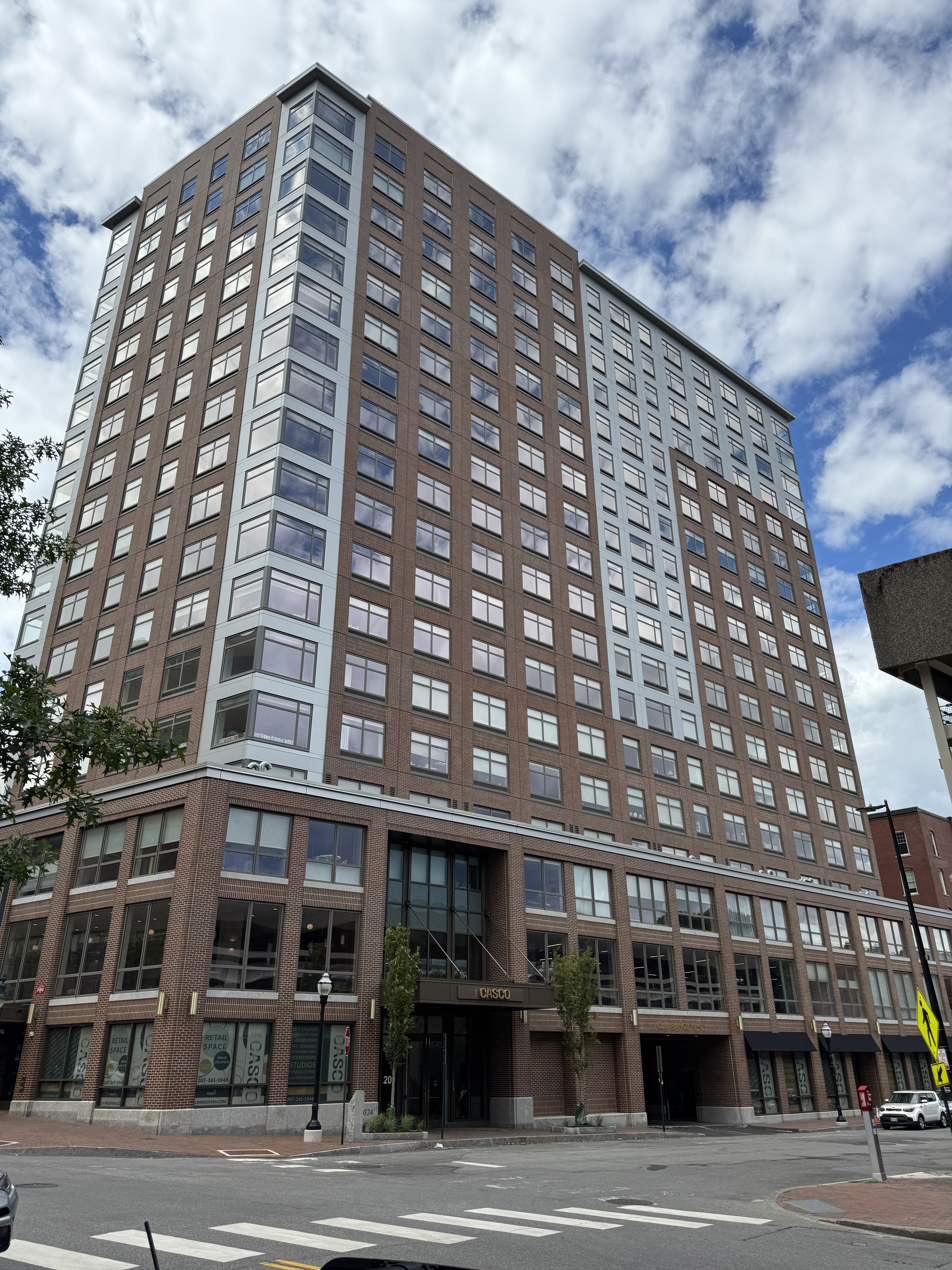
The Casco, 201 Federal Street
