= George Burnham (architect) =

American architect (1875–1931)

- Born: 1875; Portland, Maine, U.S.
- Died: 1931 (aged 55–56); Falmouth Foreside, Maine, U.S.
- Occupation: Architect
- Buildings: Cumberland County Courthouse, Portland, Maine, U.S.

George Burnham (1875 – April 1931) was an American architect from Portland, Maine. He was active in the second half of the 20th century and first half of the 21st century.

== Early life ==
Burnham was born in Portland, Maine, in 1875, to Perez Burr Burnham and Margaret Elizabeth Best.

He studied architecture at the Massachusetts Institute of Technology.

== Career ==
Upon graduating, he worked in Boston for short time, before moving to New York City to become part of the Tryon, Brown & Burnham partnership. After designing several houses on Long Island, he contracted typhoid and pneumonia in 1902. He moved back to his hometown of Portland, where he designed a home for his father at today's 199 Western Promenade. He also designed, for Henry Rines, the Somerset Apartments on Congress Street.

In 1908, he won the competition to design, along with Boston architect Guy Lowell, today's Cumberland County Courthouse on Federal Street in Portland. It was completed two years later. The duo saw off competition from John Calvin Stevens, Frederick Tompson and Francis Fassett. Other designs were favored, it is said, but Burnham and Lowell's design was the most cost-effective.

Burnham went into partnership with Edward Leander Higgins in 1909. In 1913, the pair designed the Burnham & Morrill Plant in Portland's Back Cove, part-owned by his namesake uncle. It later became the home of B&M Baked Beans.

=== Selected notable works ===
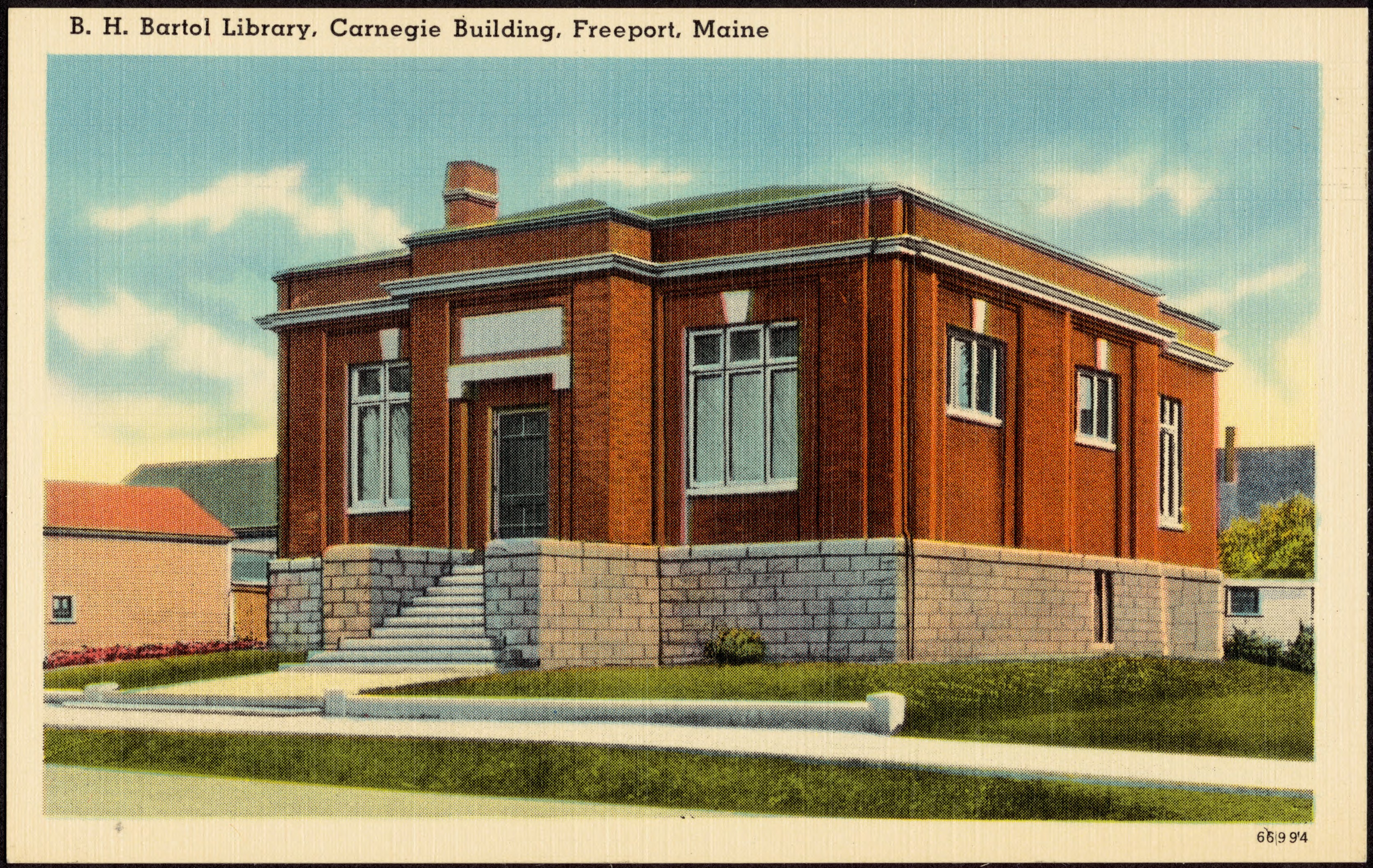
B.H. Bartol Library, Freeport, Maine

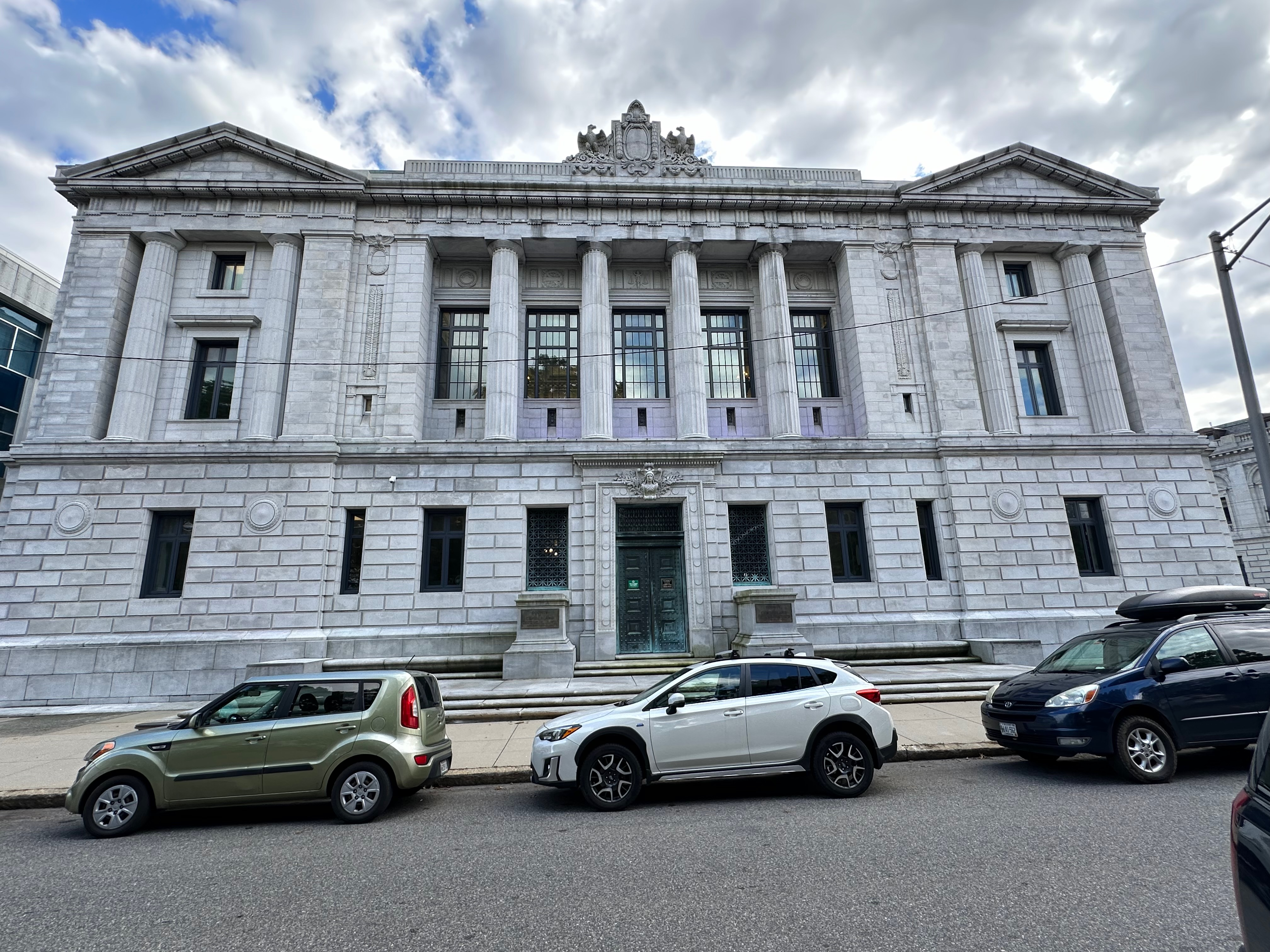
Cumberland County Courthouse, Portland, Maine

- B.H. Bartol Library, Freeport, Maine (1905)
- Cumberland County Courthouse, Portland, Maine (1910)
- Stanley Pullen Memorial Horse Trough, Portland, Maine (1910)
- Maine Central Railroad Station, Gardiner, Maine (1911)
- Burnham Block, Portland, Maine (1911)
- Burnham & Morrill Plant, Portland, Maine (1913)
- Charles F. Flagg House, Portland, Maine (1913)
- William F. Leonard House (1915)
- Charles B. Hinds House (1917)
- Sidney St. Felix Thaxter House (1918)
- Portland Shoe Manufacturing Company, Portland, Maine
- Engine House, Portland, Maine

== Personal life ==
In 1912, he built a double house at the corner of Carroll Street and Chadwick Street in Portland's West End. He lived in one half of the building for two years, before moving to Falmouth Foreside.

Burnham planned to serve in World War I by enrolling in the Army's Officer's Candidate School, thinking his engineering schools might be found useful. While training in Kentucky, he became ill and was given a medical discharge. He returned home to Falmouth Foreside in 1919.

== Death ==
In his final years, Burnham suffered from depression. He took his own life in April 1931, aged 55 or 56.
