= Franklin's Tower =

Franklin's Tower may refer to:

- "Franklin's Tower" (song), a song on the Grateful Dead album Blues for Allah (1975)
- Franklin Towers, a building located in Portland, Maine
