= The Casco =

Apartment building in Portland, Maine

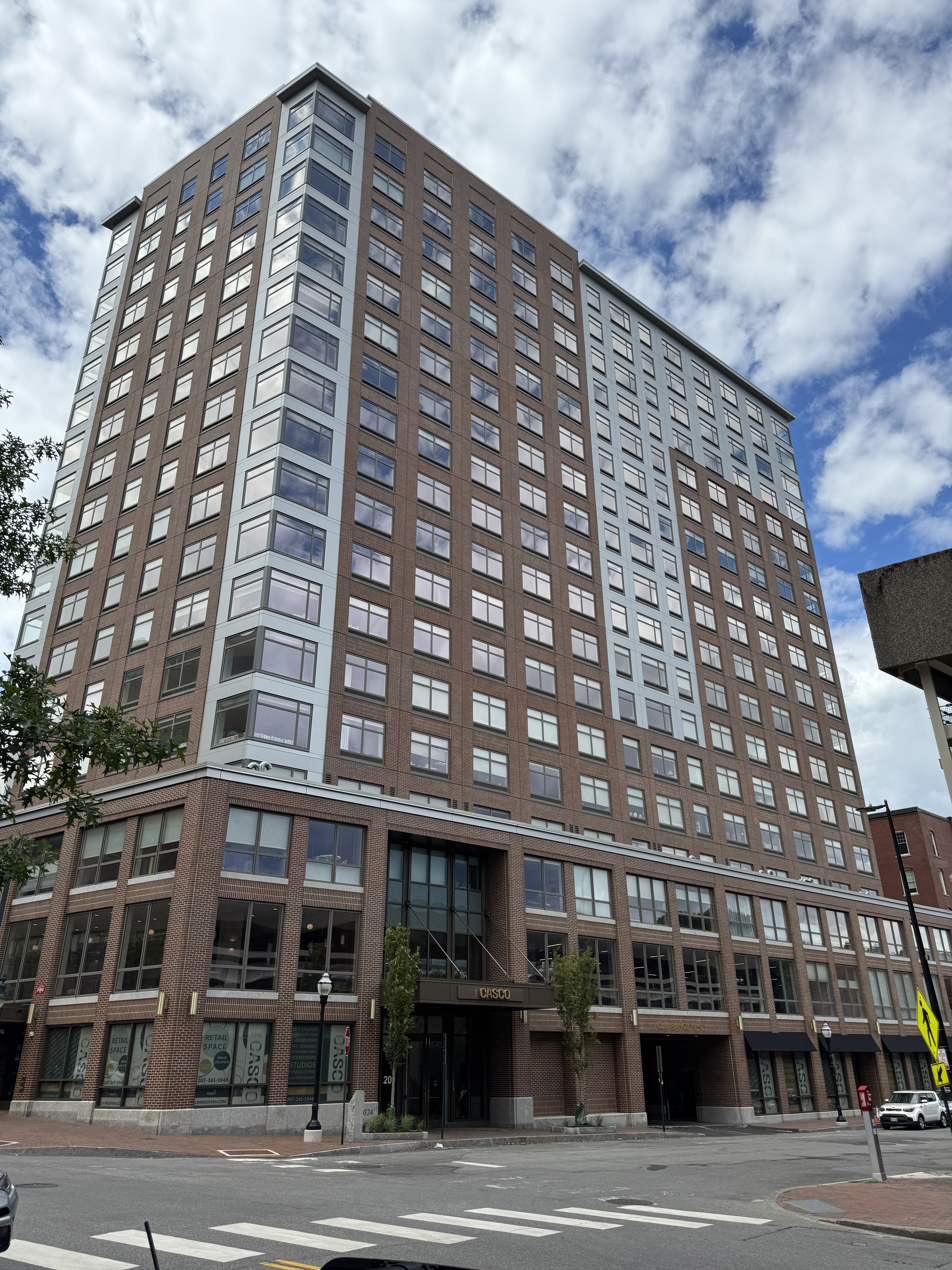
- The building in 2024
- Interactive map of the The Casco area

General information
- Location: Portland, Maine, U.S., 201 Federal Street
- Coordinates: 43°39′30″N 70°15′25″W
- Completed: 2023 (3 years ago)
- Owner: Redfern Downtown LLC

Height
- Height: 204.5 feet (62.3 m)

Design and construction
- Main contractor: Landry/French Construction

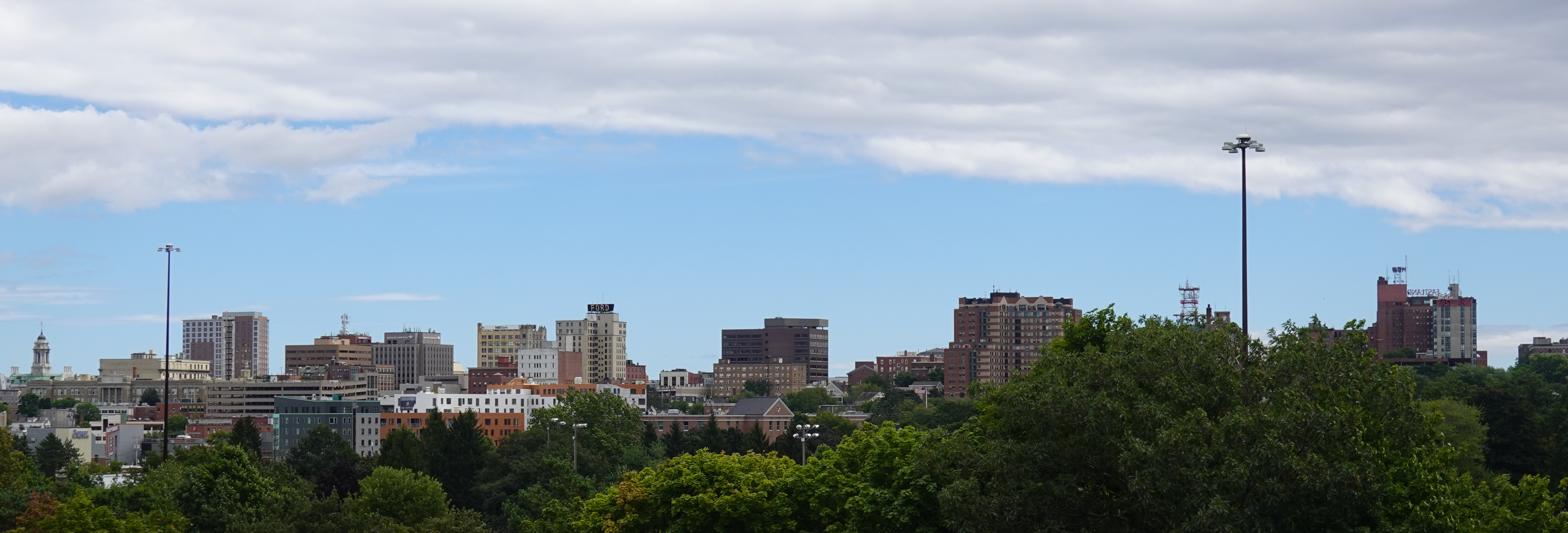
The building (left) in the Portland skyline, looking east in 2023

The Casco is an eighteen-story apartment building at 201 Federal Street in Portland, Maine, United States. Upon its completion in 2023, it inherited the titles of the tallest building in Portland as well as the tallest residential building in Maine from nearby Franklin Towers, on Cumberland Avenue, which held the record since its completion in 1969. 201 Federal Street is 204.5 feet (62.3 m), which surpasses Franklin Towers by 29.5 feet (9.0 m). It is the third-tallest building in the state, behind St. Joseph's Church in Biddeford and the Agora Grand Event Center in Lewiston.

A zoning amendment was granted by the City of Portland in March 2021, allowing the height to be achieved.

The first floor is commercial space; the other seventeen floors are residential, containing 266 apartments.

The building is owned by Redfern Downtown LLC, a subsidiary of Redfern Properties. It was built by Landry/French Construction from Scarborough, Maine.

== See also ==
- List of tallest buildings in Maine
