= Vincent L. McKusick =

American judge

Vincent Lee McKusick

Chief Justice of the Maine Supreme Judicial Court
- In office September 16, 1977 – February 28, 1992
- Appointed by: James B. Longley

Personal details
- Born: October 21, 1921 Parkman, Maine, U.S.
- Died: December 3, 2014 (aged 93) Falmouth, Maine, U.S.
- Spouse: Nancy Elizabeth Green (m. 1951)
- Relations: Victor A. McKusick (brother)
- Children: 4
- Education: Bates College; Massachusetts Institute of Technology; Harvard Law School
- Profession: Lawyer, judge

Vincent Lee McKusick (October 21, 1921 – December 3, 2014) was an American attorney and Chief Justice of Maine. At the time of his death McKusick worked at the firm Pierce Atwood in Portland, Maine, as of Counsel.

His most prominent rulings included Connecticut v. New Hampshire, Kansas v. Nebraska and Colorado and Louisiana v. Mississippi.

McKusick began practicing law with Pierce Atwood in 1952. For twenty-five years – until he was appointed by Governor James B. Longley as Maine's Chief Justice – McKusick engaged in general practice with the firm.

Prior to joining Pierce Atwood in 1952, McKusick served successively as law clerk to Chief Judge Learned Hand of the United States Court of Appeals for the Second Circuit and to Justice Felix Frankfurter of the United States Supreme Court. From 1943 to 1946, he served in the U.S. Army, in part in Los Alamos, New Mexico, participating in the Manhattan Project.

== Education ==
McKusick received his A.B. degree from Bates College (1943), his S.B. and S.M. from the Massachusetts Institute of Technology (1947), and his LL.B. from Harvard Law School (1950), where he served as president of the Harvard Law Review.

== Chief Justice ==
In 1977, Governor Longley appointed McKusick Chief Justice of the Maine Supreme Judicial Court, the first such appointment directly from the bar since the appointment of Chief Justice Prentiss Mellen in 1820. Chief Justice McKusick had responsibility for managing Maine's entire court system as well as for presiding over its highest appellate court. Over the years, he had been deeply involved in modernizing the rules of procedure for the Maine courts, serving on rules committees appointed by the Supreme Judicial Court and co-authoring two editions of the classic work on Maine Civil Practice.

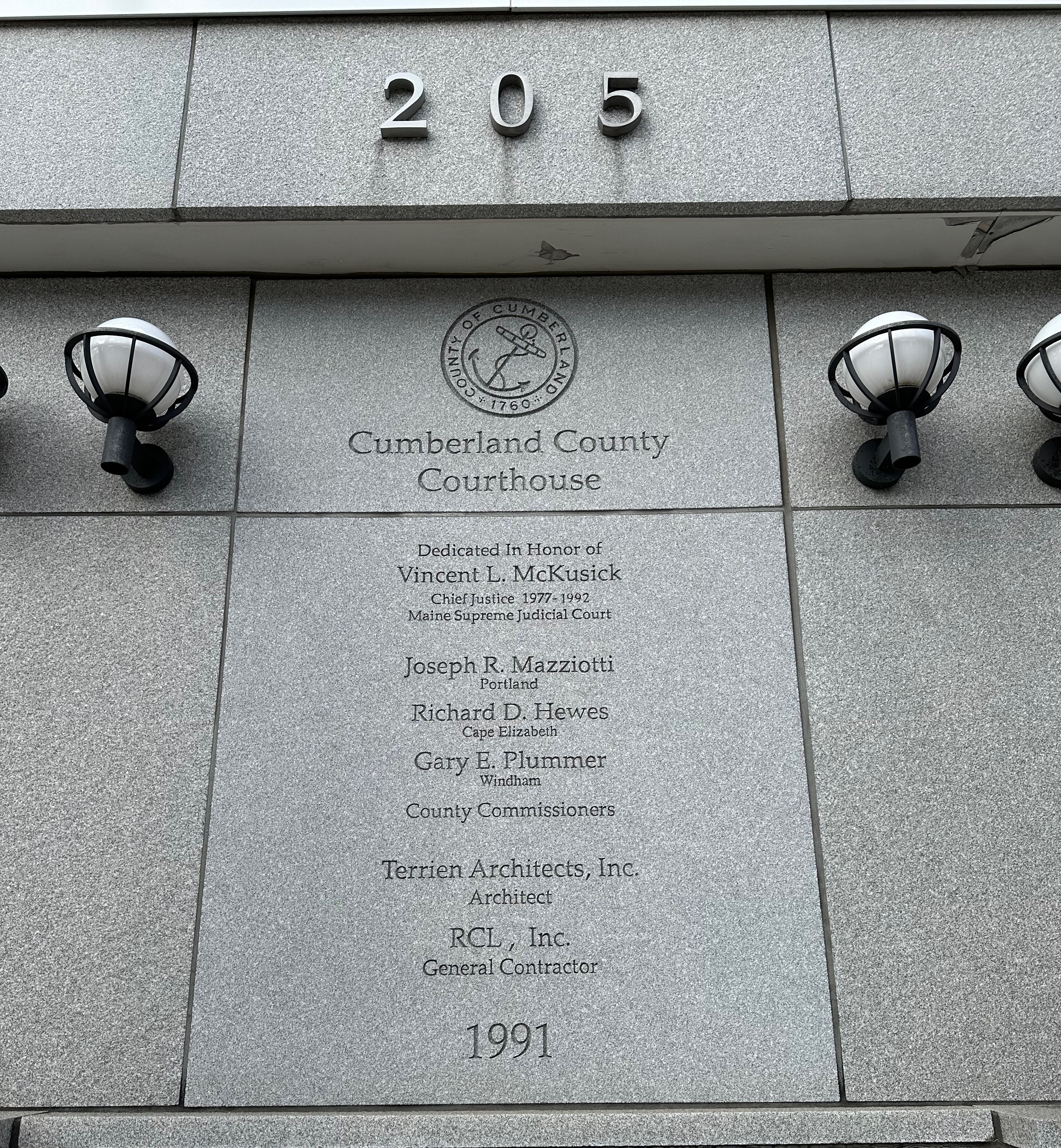
The dedication to McKusick on the 1991 addition to the Cumberland County Courthouse

For his public service in the courts, McKusick received the American Judicature Society's Herbert Harley Award in 1982 and the Neal W. Allen Award for Community Leadership of the Greater Portland Chamber of Commerce in 1988. In 1991, Cumberland County named its newly expanded courthouse for the chief justice. Vincent was the 1999 recipient of the National Center for State Court's Paul C. Reardon Award given to those who have made outstanding contributions to the administration of justice nationally and to the work of the National Center.

During 1990 and 1991, his fellow chief justices elected McKusick President of the National Conference of Chief Justices and Chairman of the Board of Directors of the National Center for State Courts. He had served and would serve until his death on the council of the American Law Institute, and also has served on the governing boards of the American Philosophical Society, the American Arbitration Association, and the U.S. Supreme Court Historical Society.

Since his retirement on February 28, 1992, McKusick has served "of counsel" to Pierce Atwood. In July 1992, he served on a pro bono basis as the neutral arbitrator for the determination of the terms under which Long Island would separate from the City of Portland.

By appointment of the Massachusetts Supreme Judicial Court, Vincent served in 1995 and 1996 as Master in the liquidation of American Mutual Liability Insurance Co. and an affiliate. Among numerous arbitrations conducted by him since retirement from the Court, he served in 1996 as the neutral arbitrator in San Francisco in a substantial contract dispute between a major public utility and an independent power marketer.

In recent years he has successfully mediated a dispute over the disposition of the proceeds from the sale of two not-for-profit hospitals in Massachusetts, as well as a legal malpractice claim of a government agency against a large international law firm. Currently he is engaged in further substantial commercial arbitrations for the American Arbitration Association.

Late in 1992, he led a small State Department delegation to the Republic of Georgia to advise on court reform, and by President George H. W. Bush's appointment he served from 1993 to 2001 as one of the five members of the Committee to Administer the Oliver Wendell Holmes Devise.

== Death ==
McKusick died on December 3, 2014, in Falmouth, Maine, aged 93.

== Professional activities ==
- Maine Commissioner on Uniform State Laws (1968–76); Secretary, National Conference of Commissioners on Uniform State Laws (1975–77)
- Chairman, Drafting Committee on Uniform Jury Selection and Service Act (1969–70)
- Member (1971–80) and Chairman (1976–77), Board of Editors, American Bar Association Journal
- Chairman, Review Committee on Uniform Rules of Criminal Procedure (1973–74)
- Member, Council of American Law Institute (1968 to present)
- Life Fellow, American Bar Foundation; member, Board of Directors (1977 to 1987)
- Member, American Bar Association delegation on China Study Visit (1978)
- Member, U.S. State Department Advisory Committee on Private International Law (1981 to 1985, 1992 to 1993)
- Member, Federal-State Relations Subcommittee of the Judicial Conference of the United States (1982 to 1987)
- Chairman, National Awards Jury, Freedoms Foundation at Valley Forge (1982)
- Leader, People to People Judges Visit to People's Republic of China (1983) and to Soviet Union (1988)
- Delegate to American Bar Association House of Delegates representing Conference of Chief Justices (1983 to 1987)
- Member, Advisory Committee on Federal Appellate Rules (1984 to 1987)
- Member, Federal-State Jurisdiction Committee of the Judicial Conference of the United States (1987 to 1989)
- Conference of Chief Justices (1977 to 1992); Board of Directors (1980–82, 1987–88); President-Elect (1989 to 1990); President (1990 to 1991); Standing Committee of Past Presidents (1992 to 2014)
- National Center for State Courts, Board of Directors (1988 to 1991); Chairman-Elect (1989 to 1990); Chairman (1990 to 1991)
- Leader, U.S. State Department "Rule of Law" Delegation to the Republic of Georgia (1992)
- Director, American Judicature Society (1992–98)
- State Membership Chairman (1992–94) and Trustee (1993–2006), Supreme Court Historical Society
- Council, American Bar Association's Senior Lawyers Division (1997 to 2001)
- American Arbitration Association, Board of Directors (1994 to 2006)

== Honors ==
In 1993, the University of Maine awarded him and his identical twin brother, medical geneticist Victor A. McKusick, its inaugural Maine Prize for their "nationally recognized contributions to the quality of life."

== See also ==
- List of law clerks for the second seat of the Supreme Court of the United States
