= Spring Lawn =

Coordinates: 42°20′59″N 73°16′59″W

Spring Lawn is an historic home on Kemble Street in Lenox, Massachusetts. Built in 1904 for John Alexandre, the mansion is considered a unique blend of Beaux-Arts and Classical Revival styles. Spring Lawn was designed by Guy Lowell who was also the architect of the Museum of Fine Arts, Boston and the New York Supreme Court courthouse. The property has seen many uses over the years, including acting as the home of the National Music Foundation, Carl H. Stevens Jr.'s Bible Speaks College, and Shakespeare & Company. Today, there are plans to convert the mansion and its surrounding property into a luxury resort.

== See also ==
- Berkshire Cottages
