= Eegonos =

Historic house in Maine, United States

- Eegonos (East of Eden)
- U.S. National Register of Historic Places
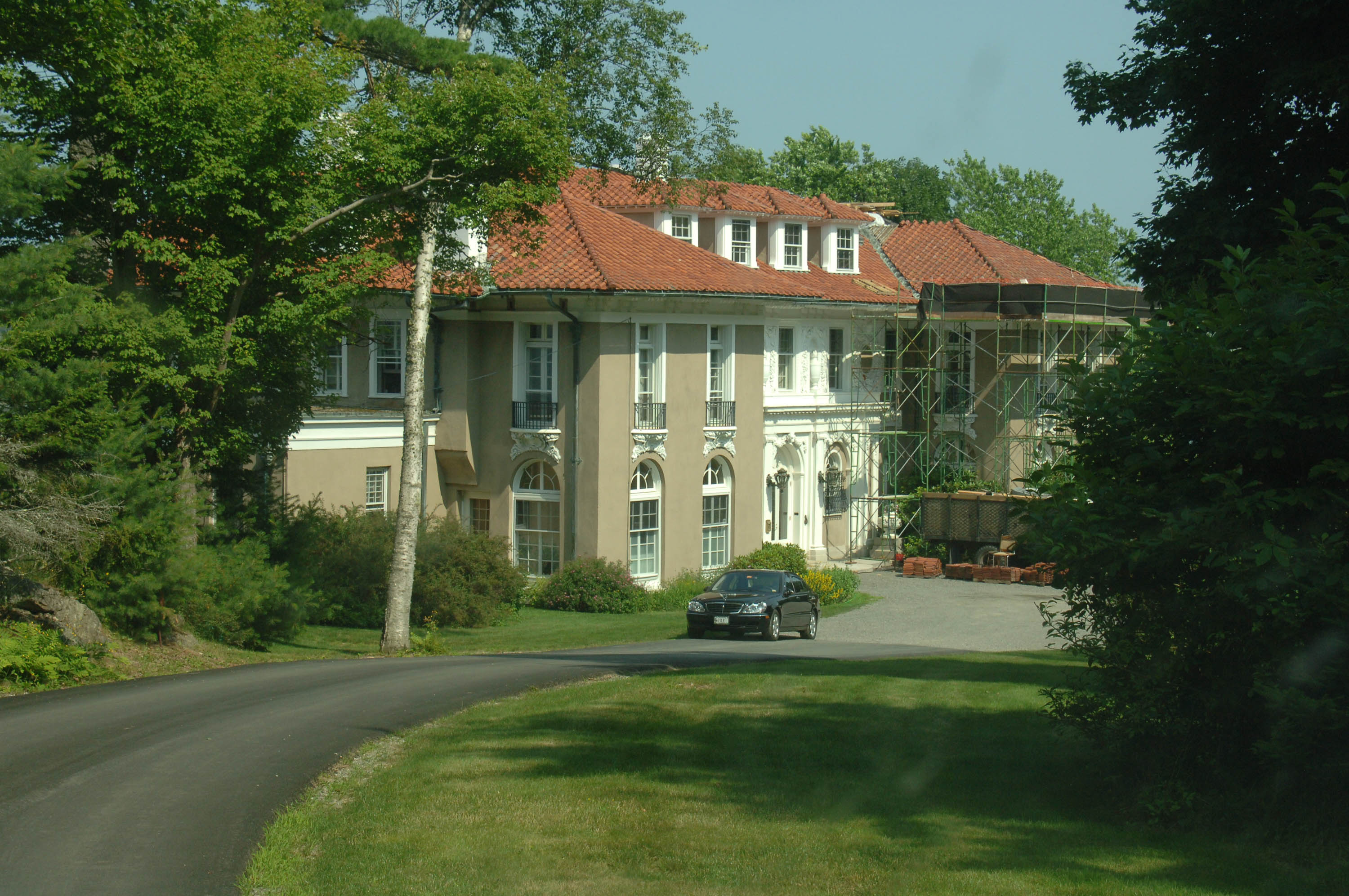

- Location within Maine Location within the United States
- Location: 145 Eden St., Bar Harbor, Maine
- Coordinates: 44°24′15″N 68°13′58″W
- Area: 3.5 acres (1.4 ha)
- Built: 1910; 116 years ago
- Architect: Guy Lowell
- Architectural style: Late 19th And 20th Century Revivals, Med. 2nd Renaissance Revival
- NRHP reference No.: 80000223
- Added to NRHP: January 15, 1980

Eegonos, known more recently as East of Eden, is a historic summer estate house at 145 Eden Street in Bar Harbor, Maine. Built in 1910 to a design by Boston architect Guy Lowell, it is one of a small number of summer houses to escape Bar Harbor's devastating 1947 fire, which resulted in the destruction of many such buildings. It is an architecturally sophisticated expression of Beaux Arts and Mediterranean Revival styles, and was listed on the National Register of Historic Places in 1980.

== Description and history ==
Eegonos is set on the shore of Frenchman Bay, about 3 miles (4.8 km) north of Bar Harbor's center. It is a 2 1/2-story H-shaped structure, with a central block flanked by projecting sections on each side. The southeastern section has a single-story porch, supported by paired Ionic columns, extending across much of its width. The building is of masonry construction with a stucco finish, and is topped by a red tile roof. The roofs of the side sections are hipped, while the central section has a side-gable roof pierced by four hip-roof dormers on both the land and ocean sides. The interiors are elegantly appointed, with a marble-floored vestibule, fireplaces finished in marble and wood, and ceilings with decorative friezes and medallions. The building has seen only modest alterations since its construction.

The first summer house built on this property was called "Sonogee", and was destroyed by fire within two years of its construction. Mr. and Mrs. Walter G. Ladd commissioned the noted Boston architect Guy Lowell to design the present building, which was completed in 1910. They called it "Eegonos", reversing the spelling of the previously named estate. The property was described in an architectural journal in 1910, along with another Lowell commission, Eden Hall, a performance hall in Bar Harbor which burned down in the 1947 fire. The house remained in the Ladd family until 1949, and was used as dormitory housing for a French language school from 1959 to 1975. Since 1975 the house has been owned by various private individuals and groups. In 2020 USA Today listed the property as the grandest house in Maine.

== See also ==
- National Register of Historic Places listings in Hancock County, Maine
- List of Gilded Age mansions in Maine
