= Edward Jackson Lowell =

American lawyer (1845–1894)

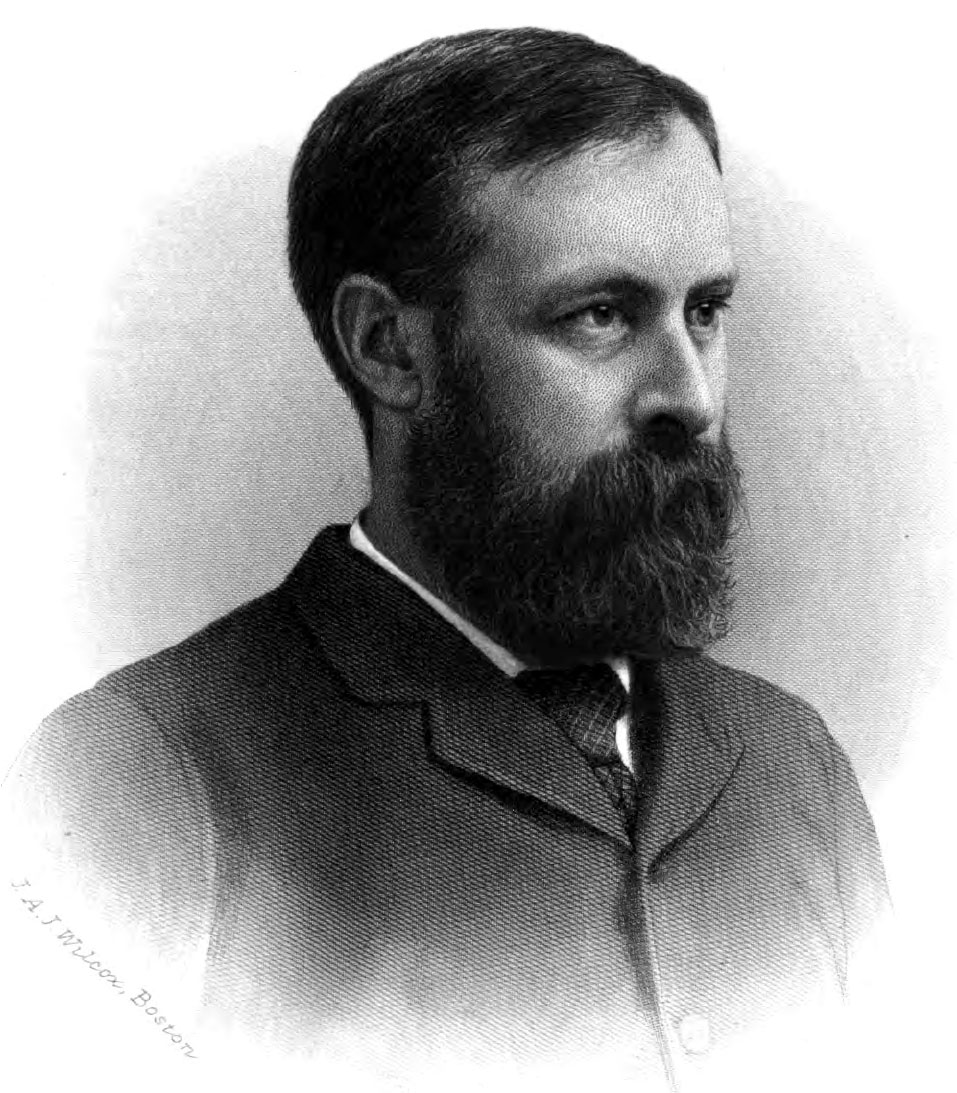
- Born: October 18, 1845; Boston, Massachusetts, U.S.
- Died: May 11, 1894 (aged 48); Cotuit, Massachusetts, U.S.
- Occupations: Lawyer, historian
- Relatives: Francis Cabot Lowell (grandfather)

Signature
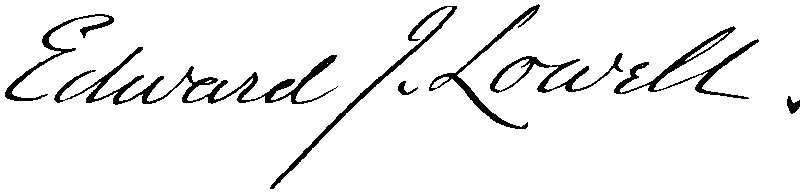

Edward Jackson Lowell (October 18, 1845 – May 11, 1894) was a United States (Massachusetts) lawyer and historian.

== Early life ==
Lowell was born October 18, 1845, in Boston, Massachusetts. He was a grandson of Francis Cabot Lowell.

Lowell graduated from Harvard College in 1867. After his graduation, he spent several years studying and traveling abroad.

Lowell pursued a business career for a year or so, studied law. He was admitted to the Suffolk County, Massachusetts, bar in 1872.

== Career ==
Lowell practiced law until 1874, when his wife died, and he gave up his law practise to take care of his children and study history.

He was a member of the Massachusetts Historical Society and a fellow of the American Academy of Arts and Sciences. He wrote several history books and numerous magazine and review articles.

== Personal life ==
In 1868, he married Mary Wolcott Goodrich. Their son, Guy Lowell, became a distinguished American architect and landscape designer. After his wife's death in 1874, he took care of his children. In 1877, he married Elizabeth Gilbert Jones.

He died May 11, 1894, in Cotuit, Massachusetts.

== Selected publications ==
- The Hessians and the Other German Auxiliaries of Great Britain in the Revolutionary War (1884). A trip abroad in 1879 got him interested in the subject of German auxiliaries in the Revolutionary War. The material first appeared as a series of letters in The New York Times.
- "The United States of America 1775–1782: Their Political Relations with Europe", a chapter from volume VII of Winsor's Narrative and Critical History of America (1888). Some sources report the title of the section as "The Diplomacy and Finance of the Revolution".
- The Eve of the French Revolution at the Internet Archive (1892)
