= Lincoln Park (Portland, Maine) =

- U.S. National Register of Historic Places
- U.S. Historic district
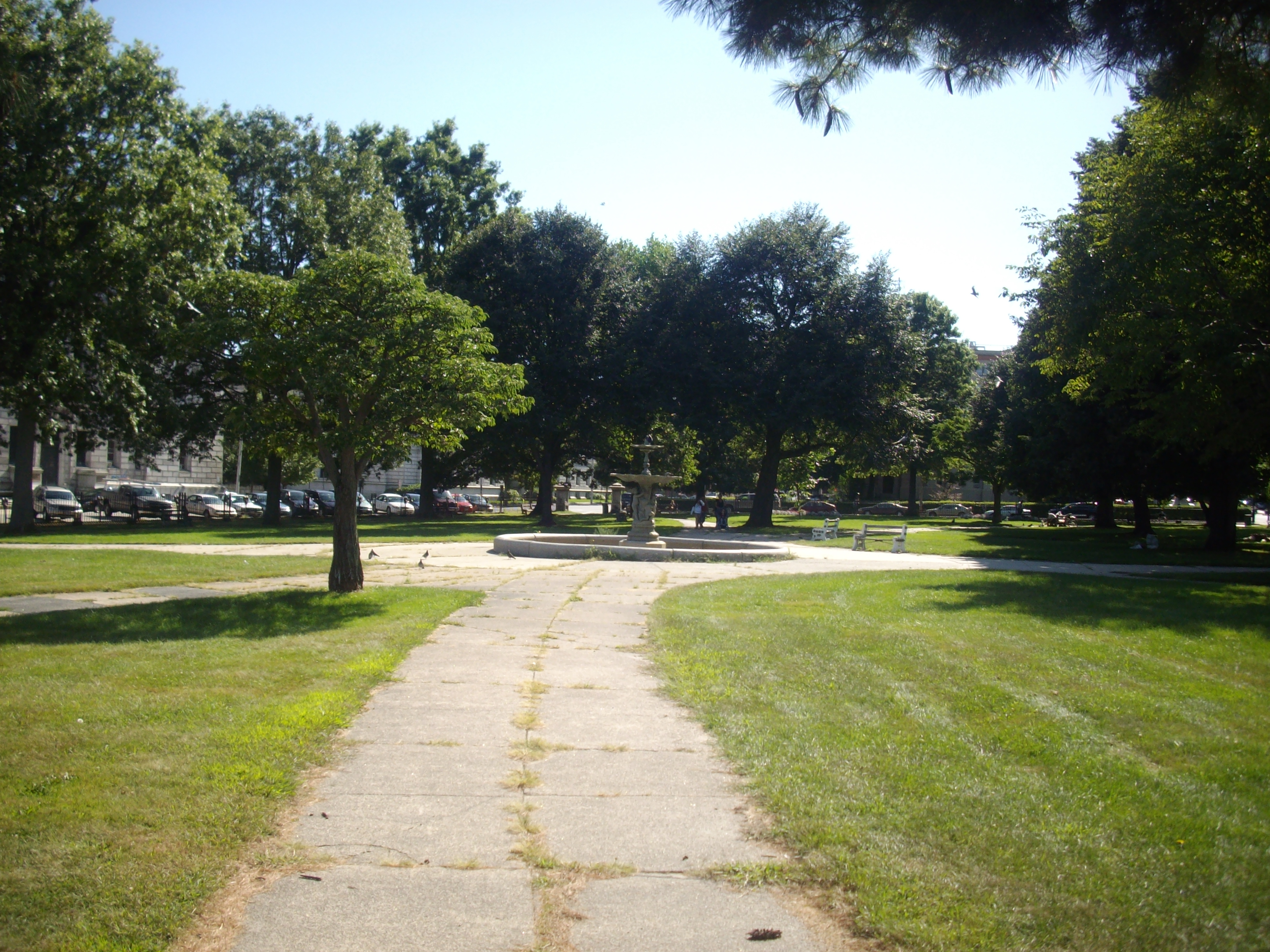
- Looking southeast toward Federal Street

- Location within Maine Location within the United States
- Location: Bounded by Pearl, Franklin, Market, and Federal Sts., Portland, Maine
- Coordinates: 43°39′35″N 70°15′18″W
- Area: 1.8 acres (0.73 ha)
- Built: 1866
- Civil engineer: Charles R. Goodell
- NRHP reference No.: 89001709
- Added to NRHP: October 16, 1989

Lincoln Park is a 1.8-acre (0.73 ha) urban park in downtown Portland, Maine. Created as Phoenix Square in 1866, following that year’s Great Fire, which burned down most of the buildings of Portland, it was renamed on January 24, 1867, in honor of former president Abraham Lincoln. It is bounded by Congress Street to the west, Pearl Street to the south, Federal Street to the east and Franklin Street to the north. The park was added to the National Register of Historic Places in 1989.

== Description ==
Lincoln Park is located near the geographic center of peninsular Portland, at the southern corner of Congress and Franklin Streets. It is shaped roughly like a parallelogram, and is a relatively flat open grassy area, dotted with trees. A network of walking paths radiate away from a fountain located near the center of the park, and there are internal park walkways adjacent to Congress Street and Federal Street. (The fountain was originally at the park's center, but its northern boundary was reduced in order to widen Franklin Street, a major city artery.) The park is encircled by iron fencing. Entrances, each of which is flanked by dressed granite posts, are located at the four corners, and at the center of the Federal Street side. A gate providing access for maintenance vehicles is located at the Congress/Federal corner.

It is overlooked from Federal Street by the Cumberland County Courthouse.

== History ==
The park, the city's first public park, was acquired in the aftermath of Portland devastating 1866 fire, in which more than 1,800 building were destroyed, devastating the city's downtown and port areas. The land was purchased for just over $81,000 at 75 cents a square foot. Its layout and design are credited to city engineer Charles R. Goodell, although a number of his design details were not implemented. In 1909, the lot immediately south of the park (between Pearl Street and Market Street) was taken and landscaped as an extension to the park. It is now the location of Central Fire Station.

=== Occupy Maine ===
In 2011, the Occupy Maine encampment, part of the larger "Occupy" protests, began "occupying" in Lincoln Park as part of an arrangement with the city authorities. At 4am on October 25, a chemical bomb was thrown into the park at the encampment. On December 8, Portland City Council voted 8-1 in favor of denying Occupy Maine a permit to stay in the park.

== See also ==
- National Register of Historic Places listings in Portland, Maine
