= Guy Lowell =

American architect and landscape designer

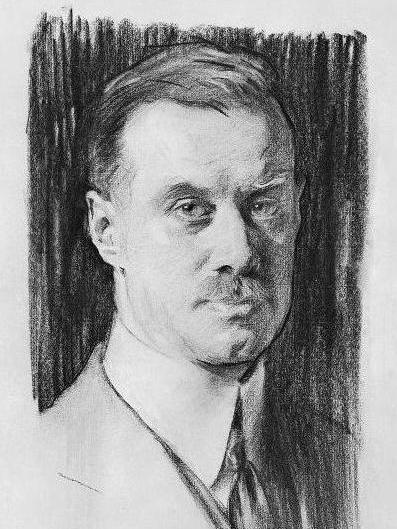
- Portrait of Guy Lowell by John Singer Sargent
- Born: August 6, 1870; Boston, Massachusetts, U.S.
- Died: February 4, 1927 (aged 56); Madeira, Portugal
- Occupation: Architect
- Parent(s): Mary Walcott (Goodrich); Edward Jackson Lowell
- Buildings: Spring Lawn; Boston Museum of Fine Arts; Natirar; New York State Supreme Courthouse; Grosse Pointe Yacht Club

Guy Lowell (August 6, 1870 – February 4, 1927), was an American architect and landscape architect.

== Biography ==
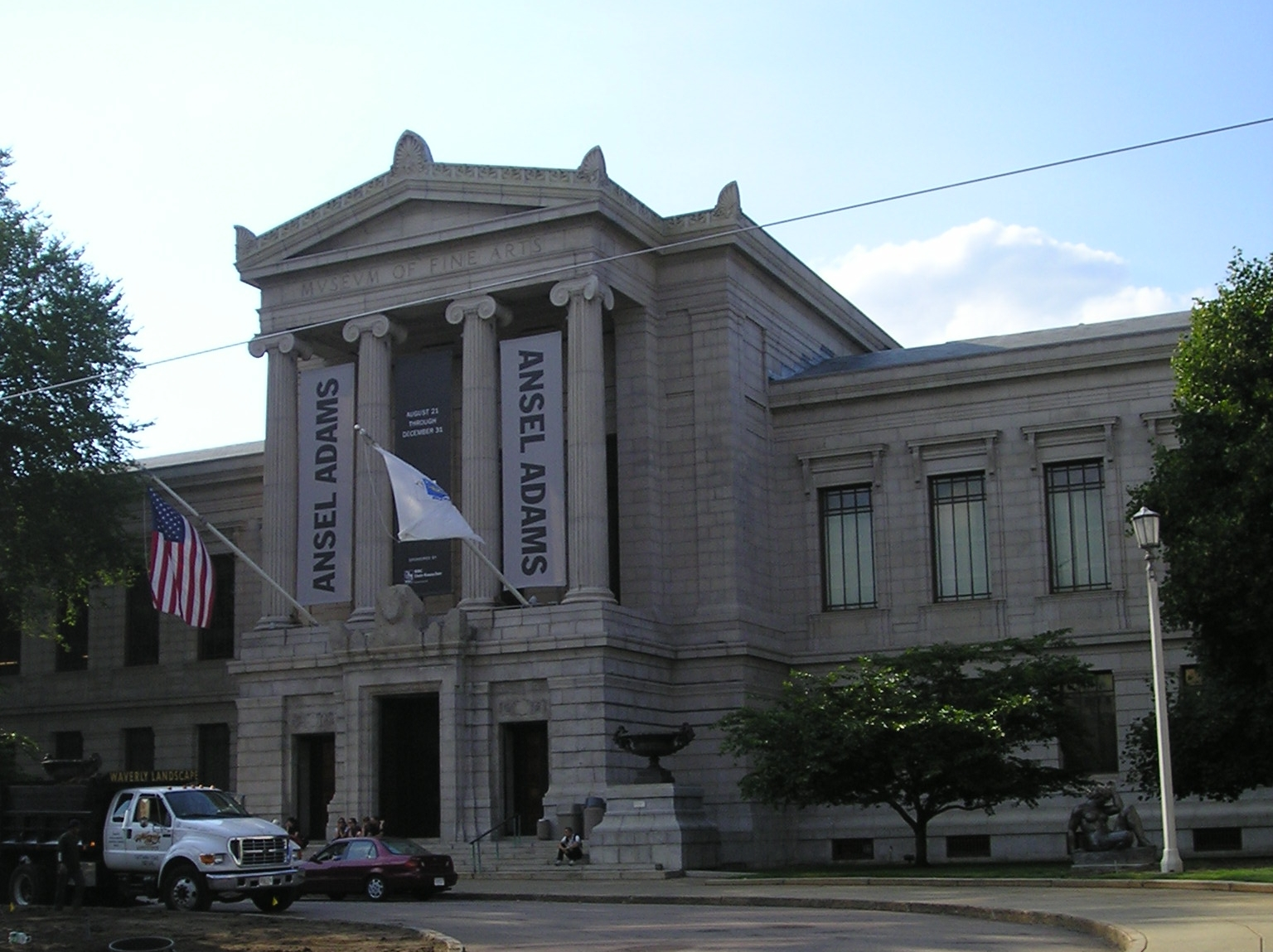
Boston Museum of Fine Arts Huntington Ave, Boston, MA

Born in Boston, Massachusetts, Lowell was the son of Mary Walcott (Goodrich) and Edward Jackson Lowell, and a member of Boston's well-known Lowell family. He graduated from Noble's Classical School (later Noble and Greenough School) in 1888 and from Harvard College in 1892, and received his degree in architecture from the Massachusetts Institute of Technology in 1894. He then studied landscape and horticulture at the Royal Botanic Gardens, Kew, and architectural history and landscape architecture in the atelier of Jean-Louis Pascal at the École des Beaux-Arts in Paris, with diplomé in 1899. In the middle of these studies he married Henrietta Sargent, the daughter of the director of Harvard's Arnold Arboretum, Charles S. Sargent of Brookline, Massachusetts, on May 17, 1898.

Returning to the United States, Lowell opened his own practice in Boston in 1899 and was successful immediately. By 1906, he had opened a branch office in New York and later split each week between New York and Boston. His commissions included large public, academic, and commercial buildings, as well as many distinctive residences, country estates, and formal gardens. He was the architect and landscape architect for the first Charles River dam, completed in 1910, which transformed the tidal river into the Charles River Basin. He designed five structures on the dam: the Upper and Lower Lock Gate Houses, the Stable, the Boat House, and an open pavilion. As part of the dam's construction, Frederick Law Olmsted's Charlesbank was extended from Charles Circle to the Harvard Bridge, and Lowell was responsible for the landscape design of the Boston Embankment, now universally known as the Esplanade. Lowell is perhaps most recognized for his design of two public buildings: the Boston Museum of Fine Arts (1906–09 and later additions) and the New York State Supreme Court building in New York City (1912–1914 and 1919–1927). Some of his other commissions included Lowell Lecture Hall at Harvard and academic buildings at Phillips Academy Andover, Simmons College, and Brown University.

Guy's work on Harvard University's President's House was commissioned by his cousin, Abbott Lawrence Lowell, during his tenure as Harvard President (1909–1933). The house remained the residence of succeeding presidents until 1971, when Derek Bok (1971–1991) moved his young family to the bucolic grounds of the Elmwood colonial mansion. Elmwood was the lifelong home of another of Guy's ancestors, the celebrated American writer, poet, and foreign diplomat James Russell Lowell (1819–1891). As Percival Lowell's third cousin, Guy became the sole trustee of the Lowell Observatory after his cousin's death in 1916.

Lowell also made a name for himself as a landscape architect. His obituary in The New York Times notes that he designed or "fitted up" gardens for the elder J. Pierpont Morgan, Andrew Carnegie, and the Piping Rock Club. Additional garden-related projects included those of T. Jefferson Coolidge, Mrs. Oscar Lasigi in Stockbridge, Massachusetts, and Payne Whitney in Manhasett on Long Island. Lowell designed many of the gardens and grounds for his numerous residential commissions as an architect, but the most significant project appears to have been the grounds of Harbor Hill (1905); the estate may have been Lowell's largest landscape architecture commission.

It is in the area of education that Lowell left his lasting mark on the profession of landscape architecture. He founded the short-lived, but influential, landscape architecture program at MIT (1900–1910). Under his guidance, the program developed as a synthesis of French planning ideals and Italian garden design, with a significant emphasis on horticulture and engineering. The first students graduated from the program in 1902. It was an undergraduate option from 1900 until 1904, and it continued as a graduate course until 1909, with Lowell's offering instruction in landscape architecture until 1912. (He donated his services, asking that his salary be turned over to the Architecture Department.) He taught an important group of landscape architects their trade including Mabel Keyes Babcock (1862–1931), George Elberton Burnap (1885–1938), Marian Cruger Coffin (1876–1957), Martha Brookes Hutcheson (1871–1959), and Rose Standish Nichols. Lowell's program at MIT provided educational opportunities in landscape architecture for women that they could not find elsewhere; many of his female students went on to become outstanding practitioners.

Lowell also published several books, including: American Gardens (1902), Smaller Italian Villas and Farmhouses (1916), and More Small Italian Villas and Farmhouses (1920). He also contributed to American Gardens, a photographic magazine.

Lowell died suddenly in the Madeira Islands of Portugal on February 4, 1927.

== Major buildings and gardens ==
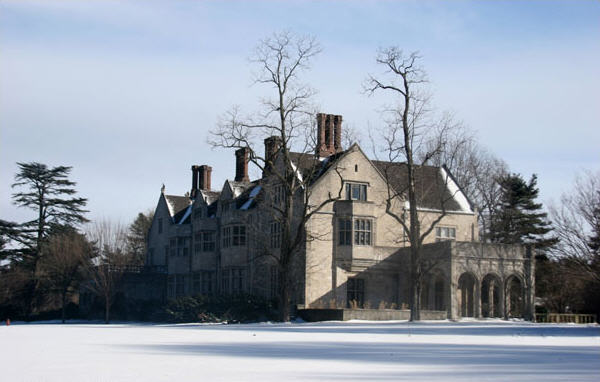
Coe Hall at Planting Fields Oyster Bay, New York

- 1902 Lowell Lecture Hall, Harvard University, Cambridge, Massachusetts
- 1906 Fox Clubhouse, 44 JFK Street (formerly 44 Boylston), Harvard University, Cambridge, Massachusetts
- 1904 Emerson Hall, Harvard University, Cambridge, Massachusetts
- 1909 Boston Museum of Fine Arts, Boston
- 1910 Eegonos, Bar Harbor, Maine
- 1910 Charles River Dam, including the Boston Embankment, the Upper and Lower Lock Gate Houses, the Stable, the Boat House, and an open pavilion
- 1912 Natirar, Somerset Hills, New Jersey
- 1913 New York State Supreme Courthouse, New York City
- 1913 Planting Fields Arboretum, Oyster Bay, New York
- 1929 Grosse Pointe Yacht Club, Grosse Pointe Shores, Michigan

== Other selected buildings ==
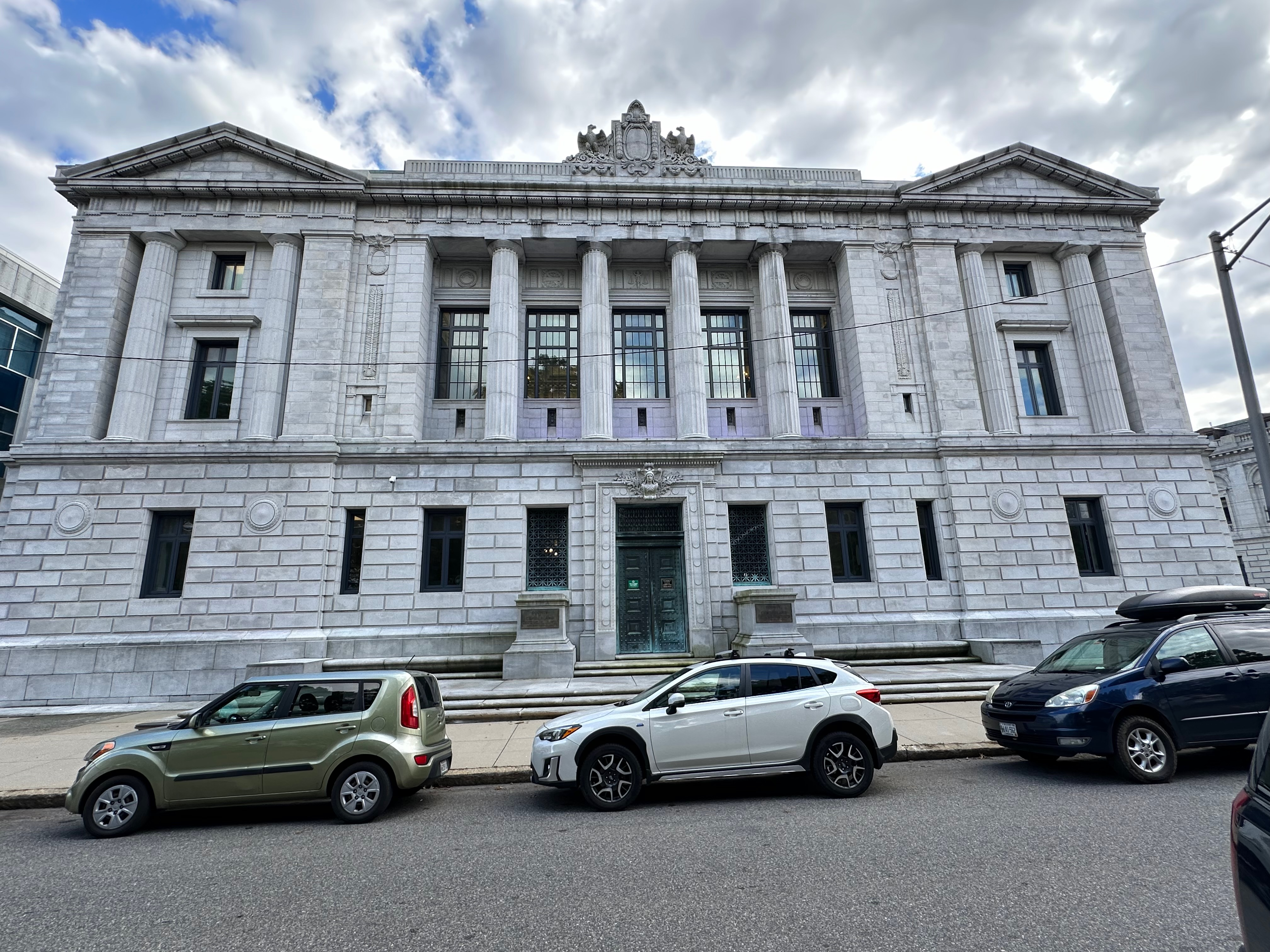
Cumberland County Courthouse, Portland, Maine

- 1900 13 Follen Street, Cambridge, Massachusetts, built for Alice Lowell Ropes
- 1901 Tupper Manor (now part of Endicott College), Beverly, Massachusetts
- 1902 Johnson Memorial Fountain, Boston, Massachusetts
- 1904 Spring Lawn, Kemble Street, Lenox, Massachusetts
- 1907 Memorial Hospital of Rhode Island, Pawtucket, Rhode Island
- 1907 Unitarian Church of Barnstable, Cobb's Hill, Barnstable, Massachusetts
- 1909 New Hampshire Historical Society building, 30 Park Street, Concord, New Hampshire; the pediment contains sculpture by Daniel Chester French that includes the Society's crest flanked by figures representing Modern History and Ancient History
- 1910 Cumberland County Courthouse, Portland, Maine (with George Burnham)
- 1911 Piping Rock Clubhouse, Locust Valley, New York
- 1912 Harvard University President's House, Cambridge, Massachusetts
- 1913 Boscawen Public Library, Boscawen, New Hampshire
- 1921 Community House, Hamilton, Massachusetts
- 1922 Fuller Memorial Bell Tower, Phillips Academy, Andover, Massachusetts
- 1926-1927 William B. Given Residence Mill Neck, New York
