= Grosse Pointe Yacht Club =

Historic yacht club in Grosse Pointe, Michigan

- Burgee
- Short name: GPYC
- Founded: 1914; 112 years ago
- Location: Grosse Pointe Shores, Michigan, U.S.
- Commodore: Jason Grobbel
- Website: Official website

The Grosse Pointe Yacht Club (GPYC) is a private yacht club located on the shore of Lake St. Clair in Grosse Pointe Shores, Michigan. The club is a member of the Detroit Regional Yacht-racing Association (DRYA). The clubhouse is prominently visible and a well-known landmark along the shoreline of the lake north of Detroit.

== History ==
- Grosse Pointe Yacht Club
- U.S. National Register of Historic Places
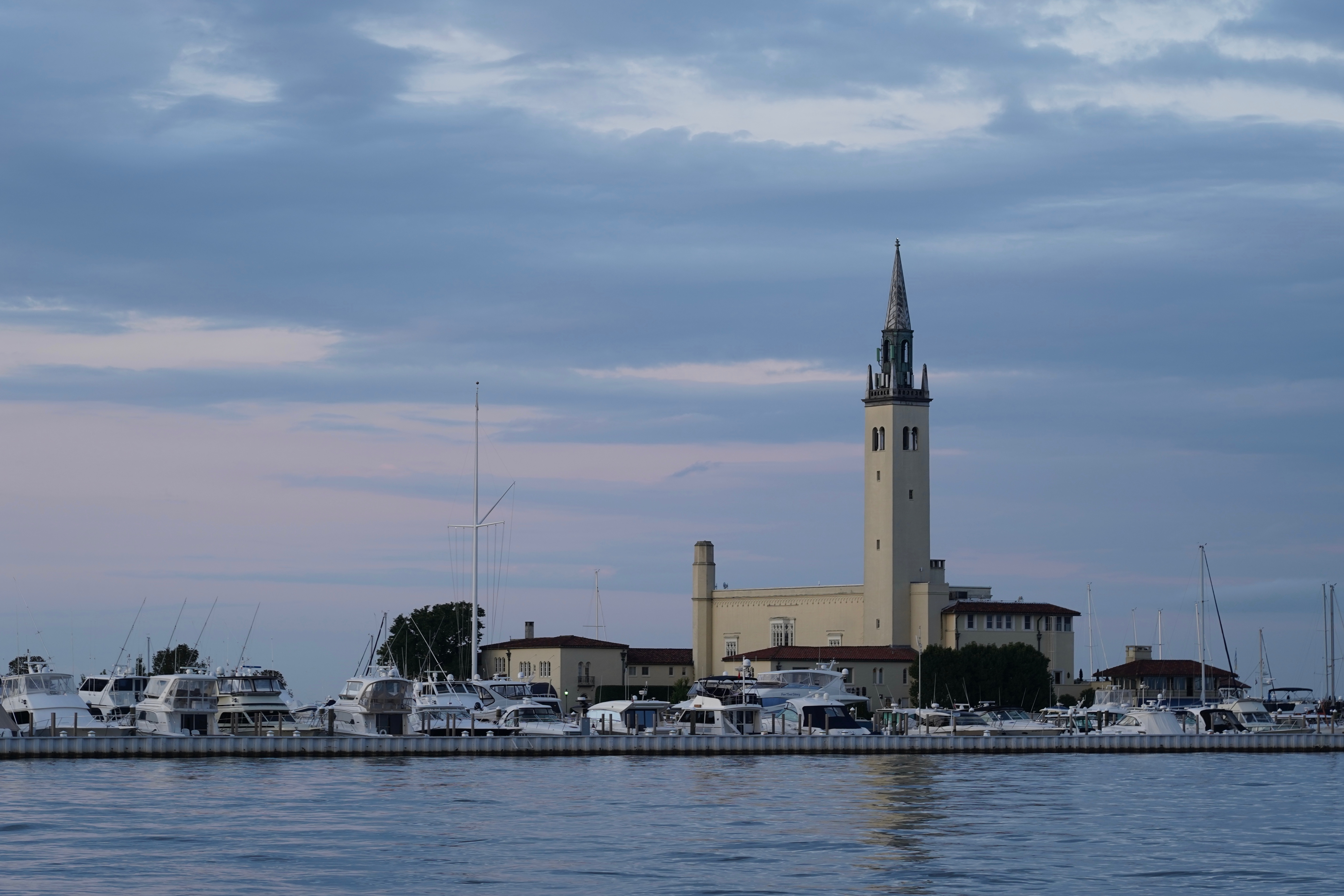

- Location within Wayne County, Michigan Location within Michigan Location within the United States
- Location: 788 Lake Shore Road, Grosse Pointe Shores, Michigan 48236
- Coordinates: 42.43488°N 82.87205°W
- Area: 25 acres (10 ha)
- Built: 1928-1929
- Built by: Corrick Brothers
- Architect: Ralph Coolidge Henry and Henry P. Richmond; Guy Lowell (concept)
- Architectural style: Mediterranean Revival
- NRHP reference No.: 14001124
- Added to NRHP: January 7, 2015; 11 years ago

The club was initially founded as the Grosse Pointe Ice Boat Club in 1910 by Frank Verheyden. However, in 1918, the club was converted into the Grosse Pointe Yacht Club.

The Mediterranean Revival clubhouse was conceptualized by Boston architect Guy Lowell, who was commissioned in the 1920s to design the building. Lowell died at sea before his plans were fully developed, but his concept of the clubhouse was posthumously adopted for the club.

After several budget cutbacks and cost overruns, the clubhouse officially opened on July 4, 1929. The original clubhouse included a ball room and several dining rooms, with the largest being able to seat 250. However, increasing budget overruns left the clubhouse in debt during the Great Depression, causing it to foreclose despite attempts from the club to solicit more members. Several optimistic members purchased the club back from creditors during the beginning of World War II, as they predicted an increase in household spending power.

In 1984, the board hired Charles Terrence McCafferty & Associates for $1,000,000 to redesign the dining and social facilities of the clubhouse. After a successful proposal, Edward V. Monahan, Inc. was contracted to build the expansions.

In 1997 the GPYC was named the “Number One Yacht Club in America” and is still considered among the best, earning "Club of Excellence" and "Distinguished Club" awards in consecutive years since 2019.

The GPYC provides amenities such as, an Olympic-sized swimming pool, tennis and bowling facilities, as well as dining rooms and a ballroom. The club maintains a deep-water marina with a private gas dock.

The GPYC maintains membership in the Detroit Regional Yachting Association and holds two annual DRYA-sanctioned sailing regattas each year in addition to numerous other sailing-related events and programs.

The bell tower serves as a navigational aid for boaters on the lake.

== Clubhouse ==
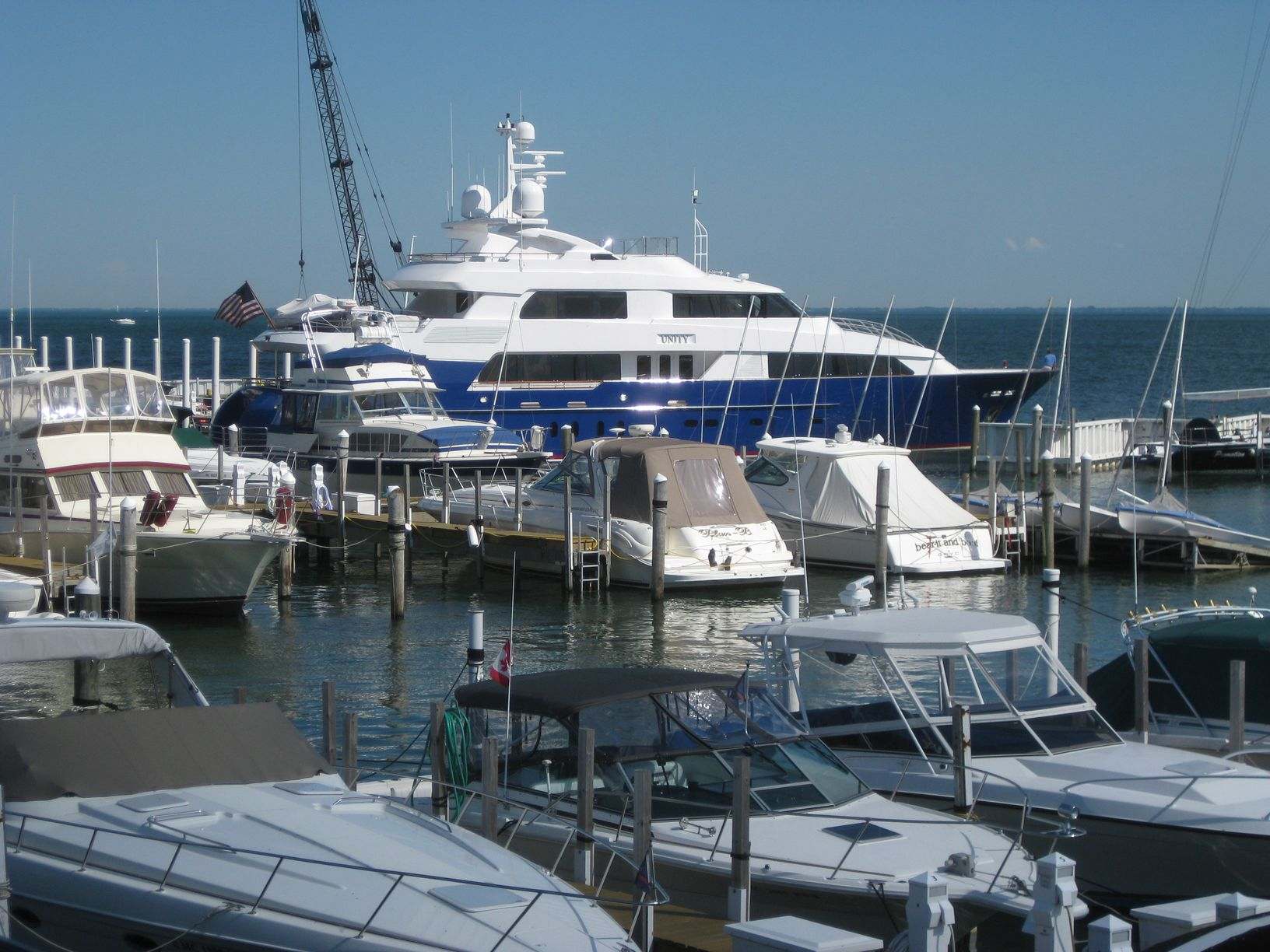
The 131' UNITY leaving the Grosse Pointe Yacht Club harbor in 2009

Upon entering the club a 50-foot foyer leads to a rotunda which leads to points throughout the club. A bronze sculpture of Wheeler Williams, entitled "Rhythm of the Waves", is a prominent feature. Amenities of the club, besides the marina itself, include a bowling alley that is open year round, an Olympic-size pool, several clay tennis courts, two lighted paddle tennis courts, pickle ball courts and a sailing center.

The club includes 3 dining rooms, a main ballroom, six bars, a pool deck and two wine cellars. The club facilities have been updated and modernized several times. The harbor has been enlarged and improved as membership quadrupled. However, the architectural integrity of Lowell's original design and the views of Lake St. Clair have been maintained. A view of the club is shown as a background to the rolling credits at the end of the movie Gran Torino (2008) starring Clint Eastwood. as well as an aerial view of the club's tower panning to encompass Lakeshore Dr. in a scene in the 1997 John Cusak film Grosse Pointe Blank.

== See also ==
- Grosse Pointe
- St. Clair Shores
