= Charles R. Goodell =

American civil engineer and architect

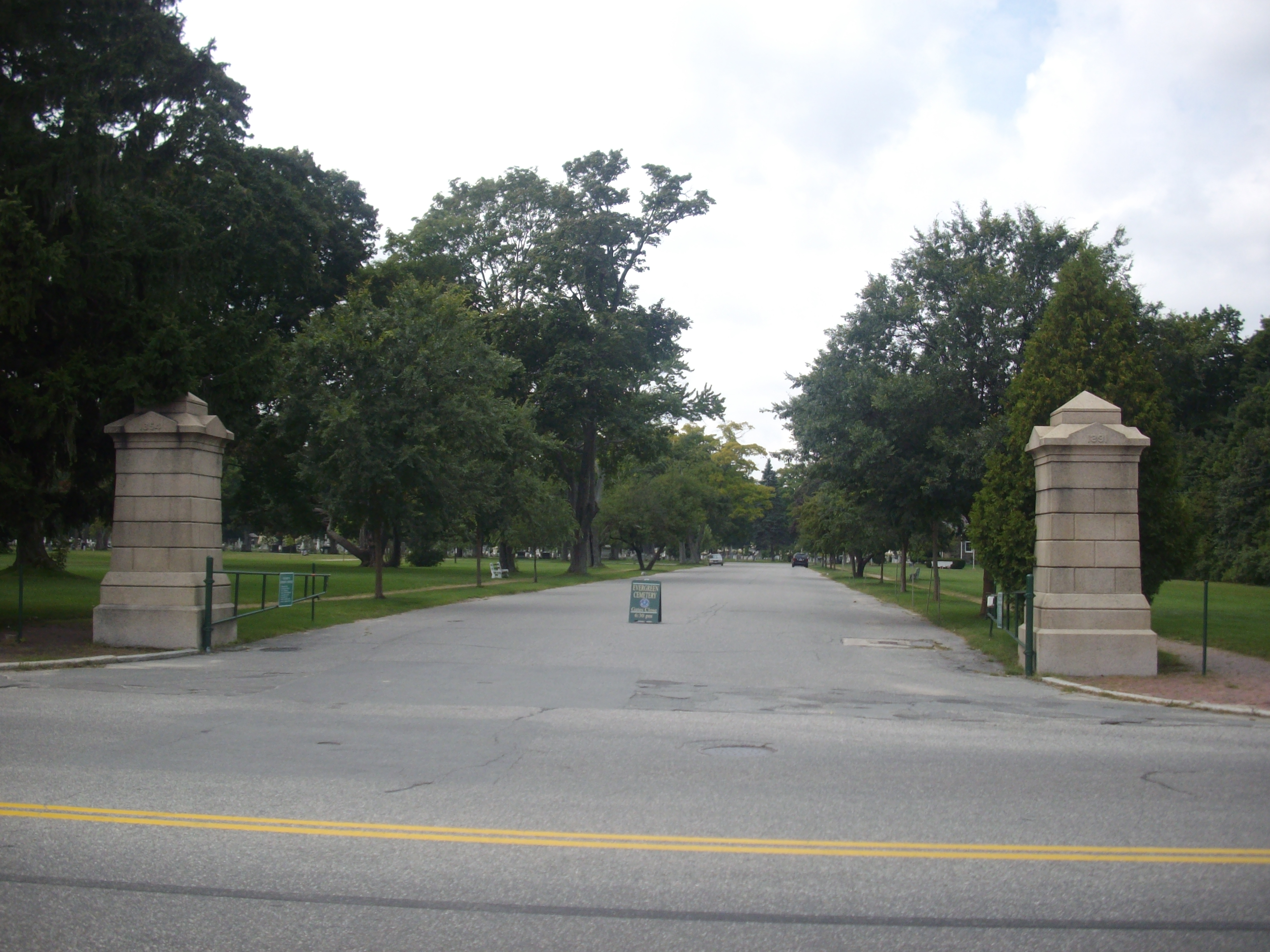
- The gated entrance to Evergreen Cemetery, which Goodell laid out in 1855
- Born: 1832
- Died: 1901 (aged 68–69)
- Occupation: Architect

Charles Raymond Goodell (1832–1901) was an American civil engineer and architect, prominent in the second half of the 19th century. Two of his works — Evergreen Cemetery and Lincoln Park, both in Portland, Maine — are now on the National Register of Historic Places.

== Selected works ==
- Evergreen Cemetery, Portland, Maine (1855)
- Lincoln Park, Portland, Maine (1866)
- Eastern Promenade, Portland, Maine (regeneration, 1878)

== Personal life ==
Goodell was married to Susan Watson Anderson (1835–1888).

== Gallery ==
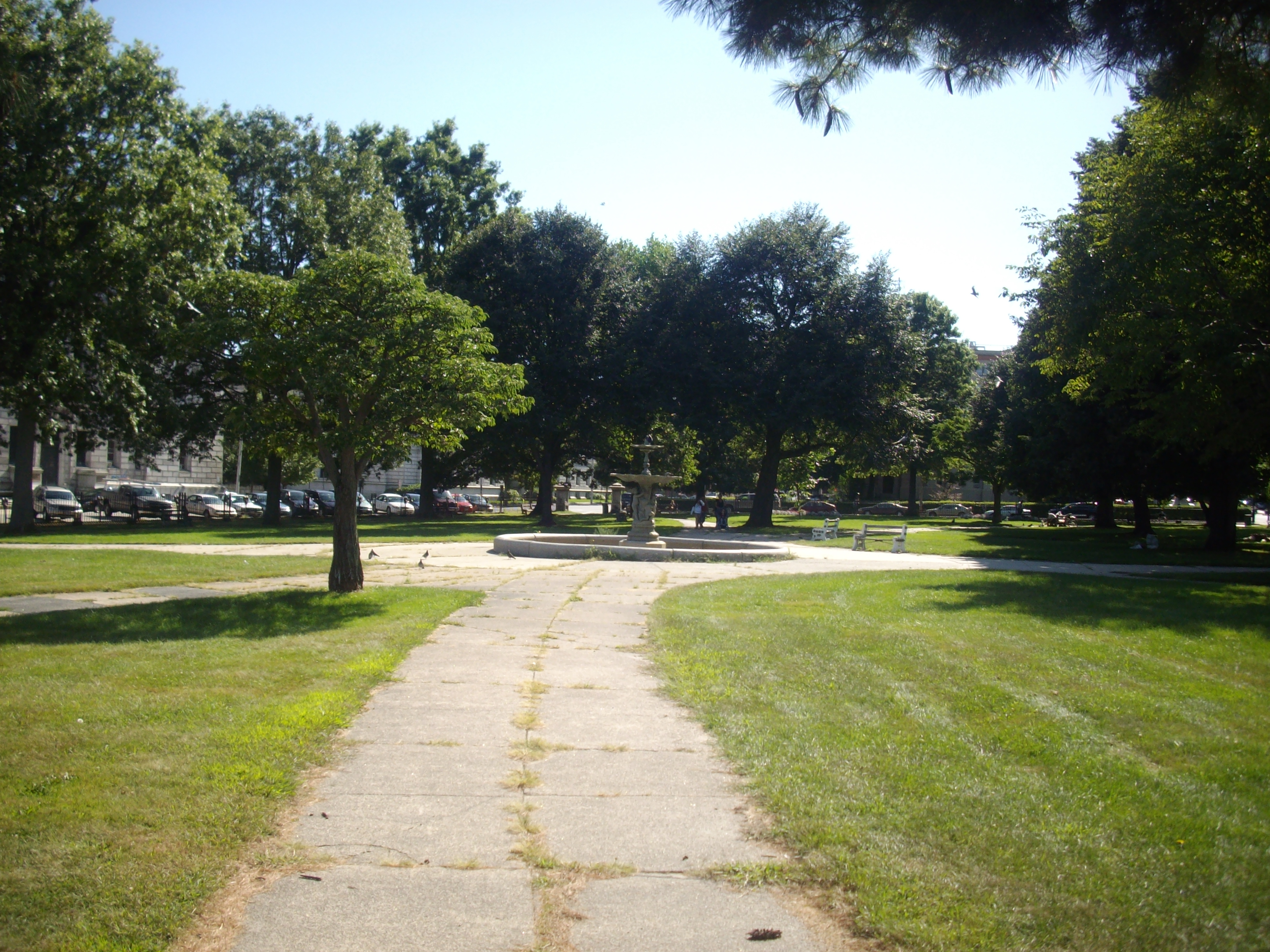
Lincoln Park
