= Eastern Promenade =

- U.S. National Register of Historic Places
- U.S. Historic district
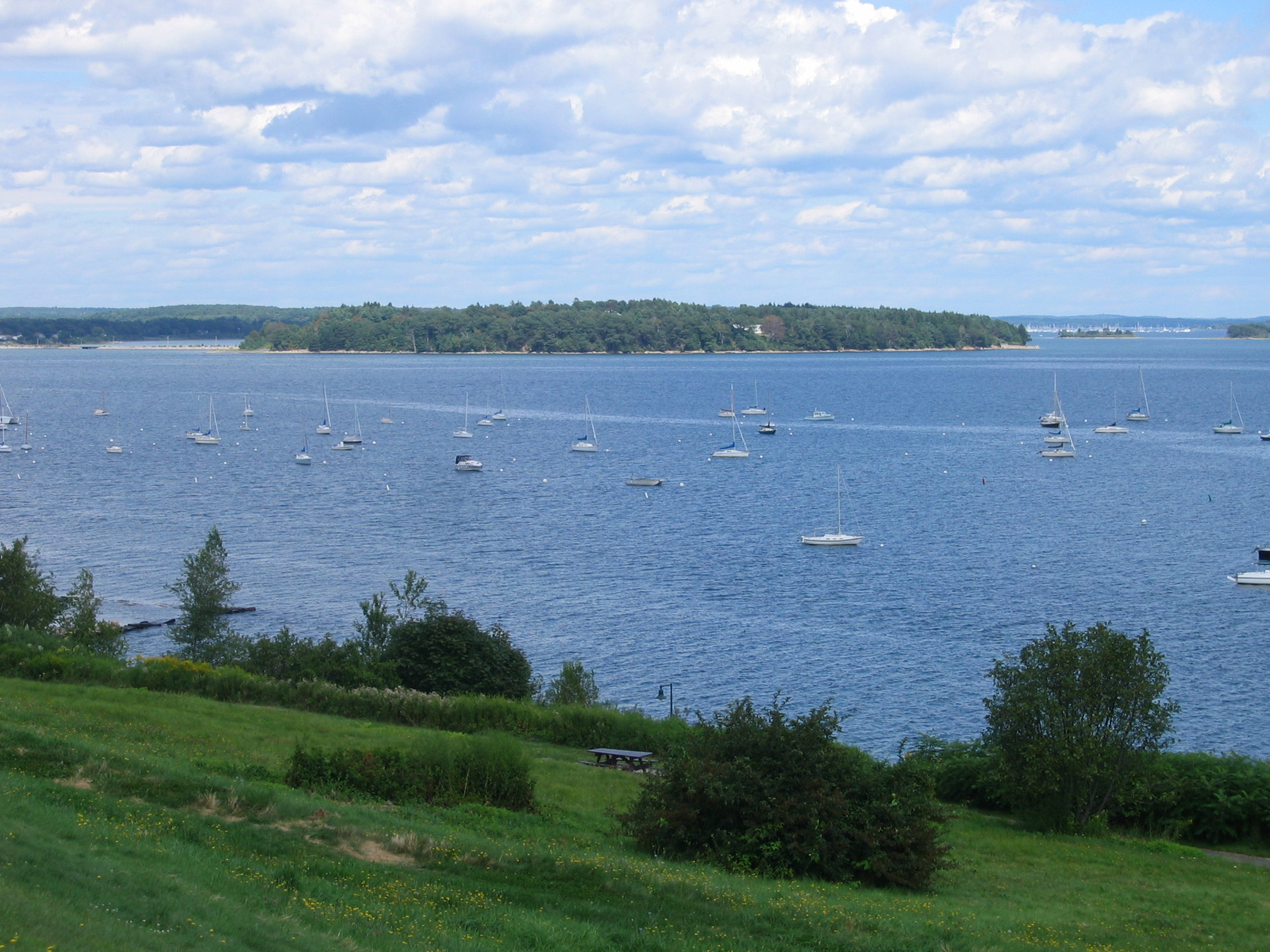
- View of Casco Bay from Eastern Promenade Park

- Location within Maine Location within the United States
- Location: Eastern Promenade, Portland, Maine
- Coordinates: 43°40′20″N 70°14′50″W
- Area: 32.3 acres (13.1 ha)
- Built: 1828
- Architect: Olmsted Brothers, William Goodwin
- NRHP reference No.: 89001707
- Added to NRHP: October 16, 1989

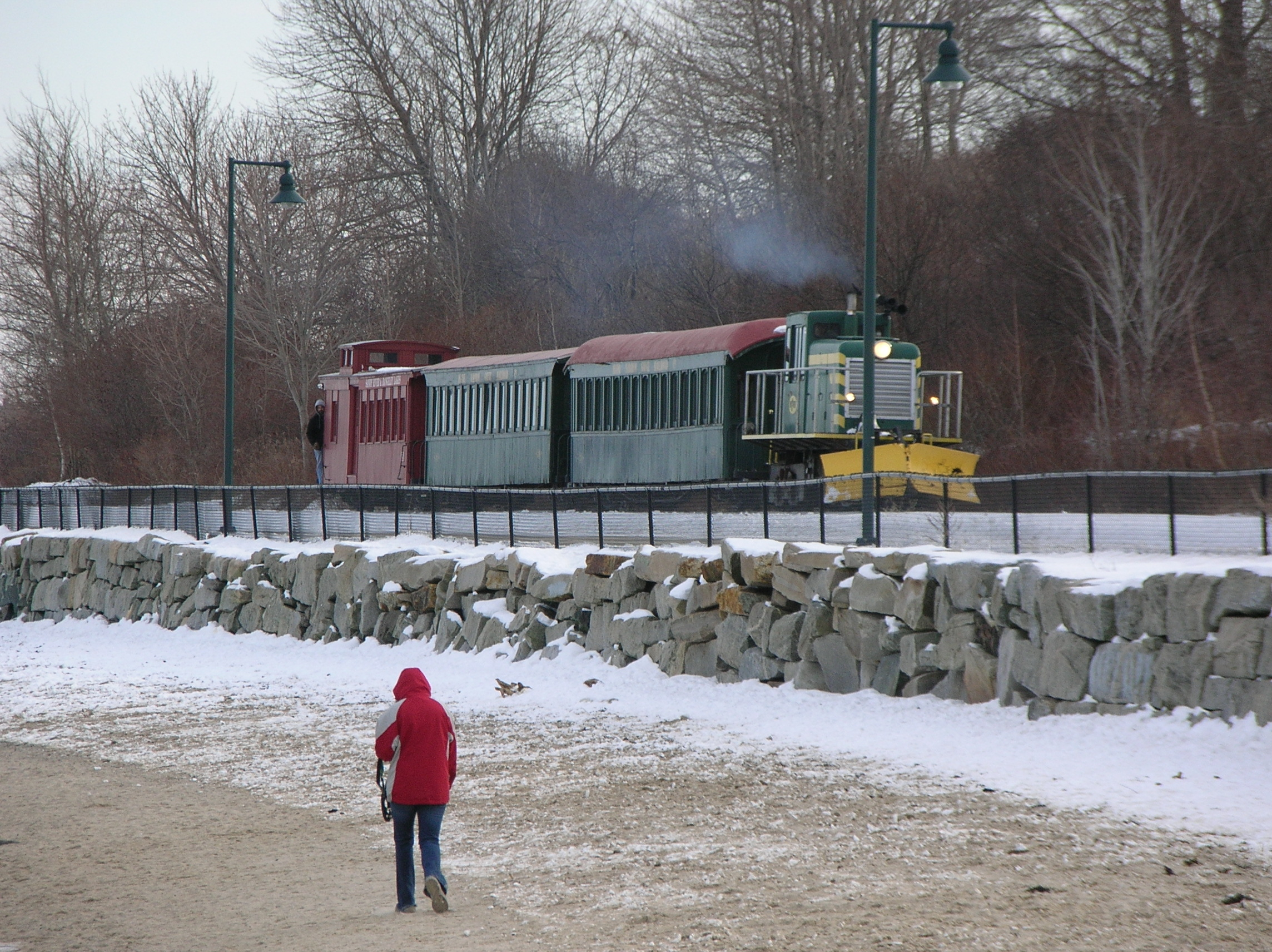
The Maine Narrow Gauge Railroad transports passengers on a scenic tour of the Eastern Promenade

The Eastern Promenade (Eastern Prom) is a historic promenade, 68.2-acre (27.6 ha) public park and recreation area in Portland, Maine. Construction of the Promenade began in 1836 and continued periodically until 1934. The 1.5-mile (2.4 km) park was designed by the Olmsted Brothers design firm and experienced its greatest expansion from the 1880s to the 1910s. The Promenade rings around the Munjoy Hill neighborhood and occupies the farthest eastern portion of Portland's peninsula. The Promenade is home to many historical sites, including a mass grave and the mast of USS Portland.

The promenade was regenerated by Charles R. Goodell in 1878.

== Recreation ==
The Eastern Promenade includes a number of recreational facilities, including a paved trail 2.1 miles (3.4 km) in length, the East End Beach, and sports facilities including baseball fields, basketball courts and tennis courts. The Eastern Prom Trail is popular with bicyclists.

== Fort Allen Park ==
Fort Allen Park is a 9.33 acres (3.78 ha) public park on the Eastern Promenade. It is the site of Fort Allen, which was active in the Revolutionary War and War of 1812; only a few earthworks remain. The park is home to an American Civil War monument in the form of a granite bench dedicated in 1929. It honors the Union Army. Fort Allen Park is also the home of the mast of USS Portland, a heavy cruiser commissioned by the United States Navy in 1933. Portland was the only United States ship to participate in all four Pacific aircraft carrier battles of 1942: Coral Sea in May, Midway in June, Eastern Solomons in August, and Santa Cruz Islands in October. Portland was then damaged during the Naval Battle of Guadalcanal in November.

== 1812 cemetery ==
In December 1812, following the Battle of Queenston Heights during the War of 1812, HMS Regulus, a British ship, docked under a truce flag in Portland's harbor en route from Quebec to Boston, Massachusetts, due to the presence of fever, malnutrition and dysentery among the American prisoners of war on board. 26 of the prisoners were taken to the local hospital and a month later, 21 of the prisoners had died. The dead soldiers were buried in a mass grave at the foot of Quebec Street on the Eastern Promenade, with a large boulder marking the spot of their grave. In 1887, a bronze plaque was affixed to the stone with the names of the deceased.

== Public transportation ==
Greater Portland Metro's route 1 (Congress Street) serves the Eastern Promenade.

== See also ==
- National Register of Historic Places listings in Portland, Maine
- Western Promenade, on the opposite end of the peninsula
