= Gardiner station (Maine) =

- Gardiner Railroad Station
- U.S. National Register of Historic Places
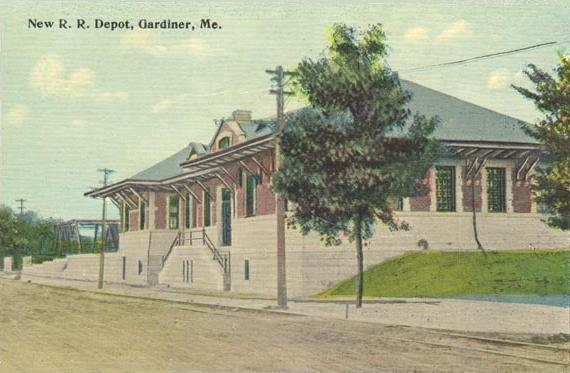
- 1911 postcard view

- Location within Maine Location within the United States
- Location: 31 Maine Avenue, Gardiner, Maine
- Coordinates: 44°13′51″N 69°46′18″W
- Area: 0.3 acres (0.12 ha)
- Built: 1911
- Architect: George Burnham
- Architectural style: Romanesque
- NRHP reference No.: 82000423
- Added to NRHP: October 29, 1982

The Gardiner Railroad Station is a historic former railroad station at 51 Maine Street in Gardiner, Maine. It was built in 1911 by the Maine Central Railroad, and was in use as a station until the 1950s. It has since seen a variety of adaptive commercial uses. A distinctive example of Romanesque architecture, it was added to the National Register of Historic Places on October 29, 1982.

== Description and history ==
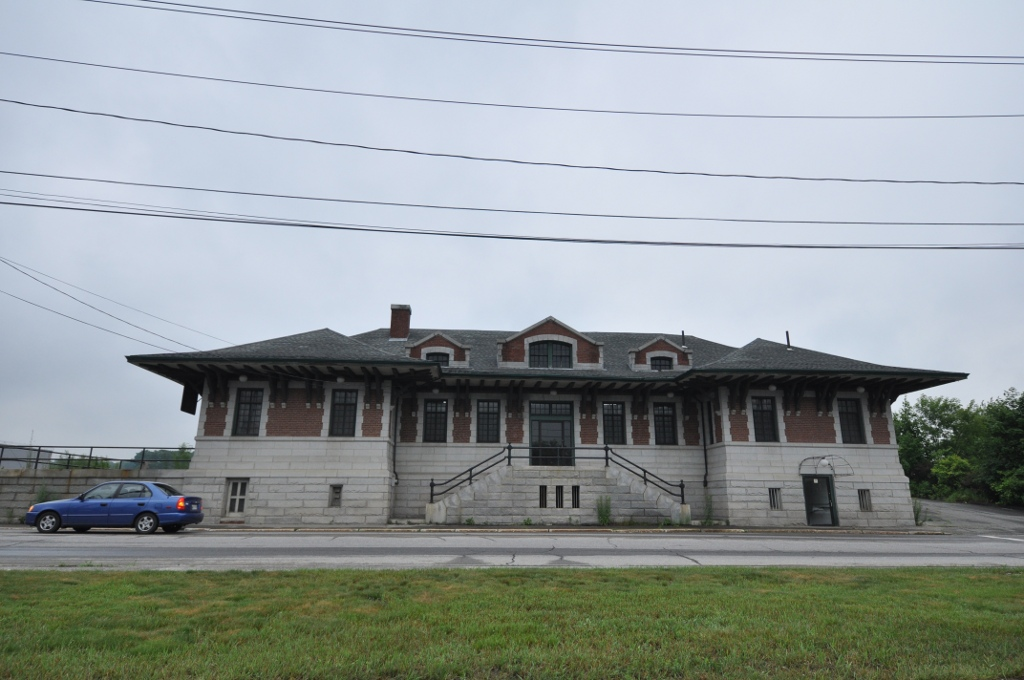
In 2013

The former Gardiner Railroad Station stands in downtown Gardiner, between Maine Street and the Kennebec River, just north of the mouth of Pleasant Pond (Cobbosseecontee Stream). It is a single-story masonry structure, built of stone and brick, and set on a full-height granite basement. It is roughly in the shape of an H, with projecting end wings, and a complex hipped roof line. The roof has extended eaves with exposed rafters, and the central roof section has gabled dormers. The building corners and window openings are quoined in smooth granite, while the basement level is of rough-cut granite, which transitions to smooth stone up to the sills of the first-floor windows.

The station was built in 1911 to a design by Portland architect George Burnham. It replaced Gardiner's first station, which had been built just to the south when service was inaugurated to the city in 1852. It is one of the state's most architecturally distinguished surviving railroad stations.

== See also ==
- National Register of Historic Places listings in Kennebec County, Maine

| Preceding station | Maine Central Railroad | Following station |
|---|---|---|
| Lawrence Mills toward Portland | Main Line | Hallowell toward Bangor |
