= St. Peter's Catholic Church (Portland, Maine) =

St. Peter's
- St. Peter's Catholic Church
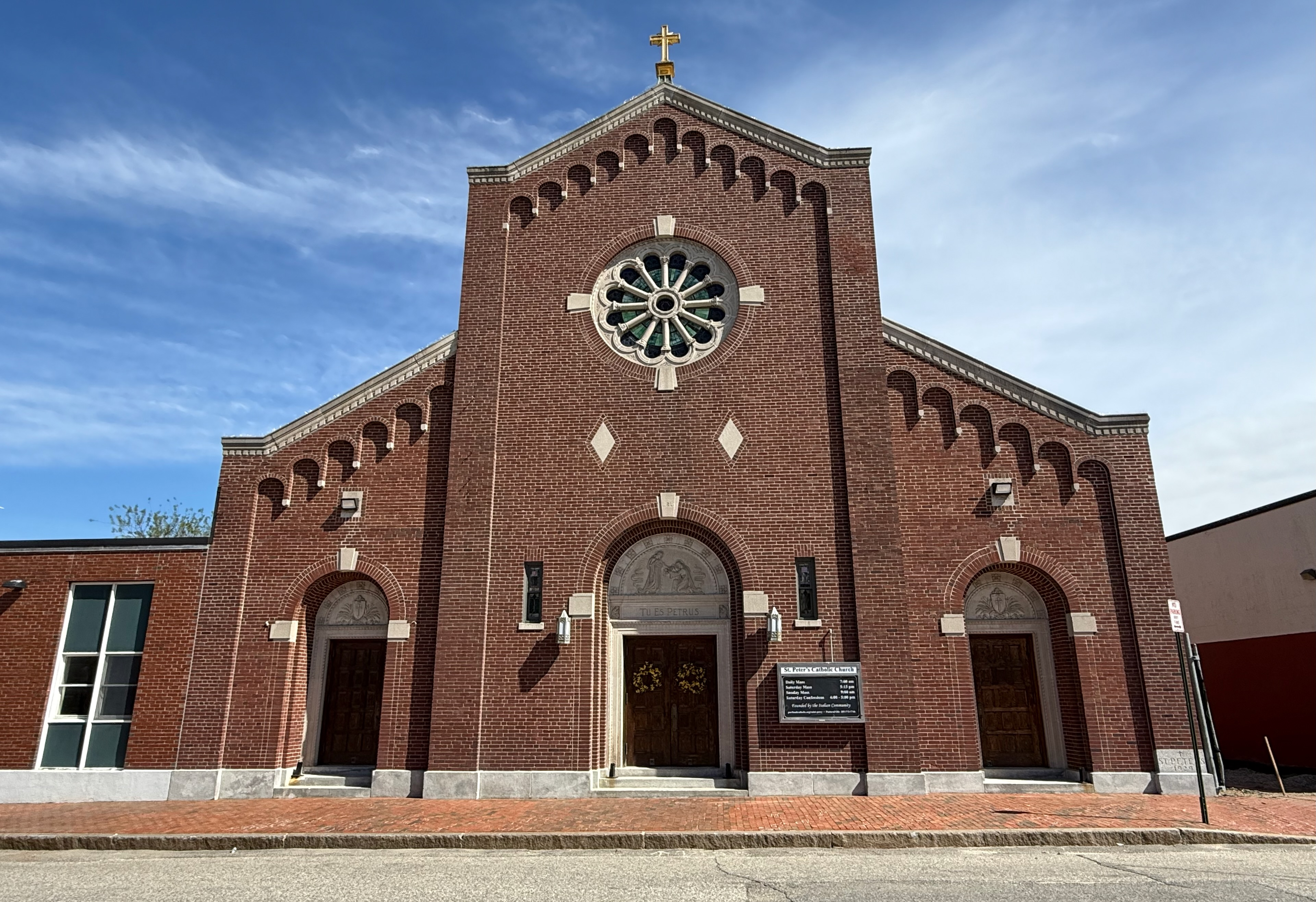
- The building in 2025
- St. Peter's
- 43.660837°N 70.251882°W
- Location: 72 Federal Street; Portland, Maine
- Country: United States
- Denomination: Catholic Church
- Website: portlandcatholic.org/saint-peter

History
- Dedication: Saint Peter

Architecture
- Functional status: In use
- Completed: 1929 (97 years ago)

Specifications
- Materials: Brick

St. Peter's Catholic Church is a church located on Federal Street in downtown Portland, Maine, United States. Owned by the Roman Catholic Diocese of Portland, the church was built in 1929, and—being in the city's Italian neighborhood centered on India Street—today hosts Italian cultural events, including the annual Italian Bazaar on the feast day of Saint Rocco. It held its 100th bazaar in 2026.

An engraving above the middle of its three doors reads "Tu Es Petrus" (You are Peter).

As of 2024, its priest is the Very Revd. Seamus Griesbach.
