= List of tallest buildings in Maine =

This is a list of the tallest buildings in Maine, United States that are over 100 ft (30 m) from ground level.

== Tallest buildings ==
Rank	Name	Picture	Height ft (m)	Floors	Year	City	Notes
1	Saint Joseph's Church		235 (72)	3	1870	Biddeford	Church
2	Agora Grand Event Center		220 (67)	3	1890	Lewiston	Event Center
3	The Casco		204.5 (62.3)	18	2023	Portland	Office and Apartments
4	Cathedral of the Immaculate Conception		204 (62)		1869	Portland	Church
5	Miller Library		185 (56)	3	1832	Waterville	College
6	Maine State House		185 (56)	4	1832	Augusta	Government
7	Lewiston City Hall		185 (56)	3	1892	Lewiston	Government
8	Franklin Towers		175 (53)	16	1969	Portland	Apartments
9	Back Bay Tower		172 (52)	16	1989	Portland	Office and Apartments
10	Time and Temperature Building		170 (52)	14	1924	Portland	Office
11	Basilica of Saints Peter and Paul		168 (51)		1905	Lewiston	Church
12	Coles Tower (Bowdoin College)		150 (46)	16	1964	Brunswick	Dormitory
13	One City Center		139 (42)	13	1987	Portland	Office
14	84 Marginal Way		135 (41)	9	2008	Portland	Office
15	Fidelity Trust Building		135 (41)	10	1909	Portland	Office
16	Portland City Hall		130 (40)	4	1912	Portland	Government
17	Verizon Building		118 (36)	7	1930	Bangor	Office
18	DoubleTree by Hilton Hotel Portland, ME (East Tower)		115 (35)	9	1973	South Portland	Hotel
19	One Monument Square		110 (34)	10	1970	Portland	Office
20	Key Plaza		110 (34)	9	1988	Augusta	Office
