= Central Fire Station (Portland, Maine) =

Coordinates: 43.6592°N 70.2557°W

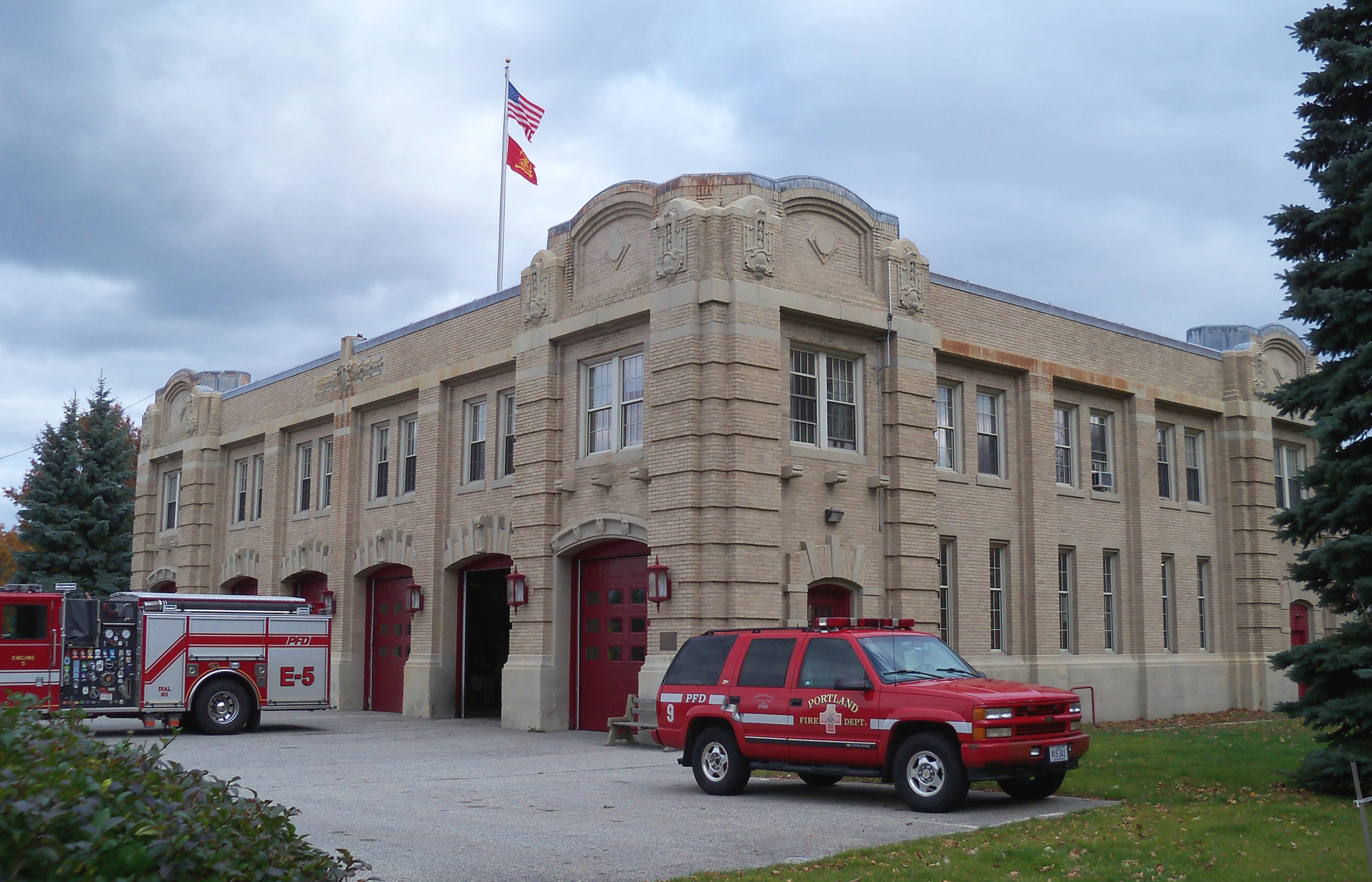
- The Central Fire Station circa 2012.

General information
- Location: 380 Congress Street
- Town or city: Portland, Maine
- Completed: 1925
- Owner: City of Portland

Design and construction
- Architect(s): William R. Miller & Raymond J. Mayo

The Central Fire Station is an historic fire station in Portland, Maine. Built between 1924 and 1925, it is home to the Portland Fire Department. In 2019, Greater Portland Landmarks listed it alongside Portland's other fire stations as "places in peril," though this designation was disputed by a city spokesperson. Adjacent to the building is The Fireman Statue, which was designed and created in 1898 from North Jay granite and located on the property in 1987. Nearby landmarks include Lincoln Park, Portland City Hall, the Press Herald Building, and the Edward T. Gignoux United States Courthouse.
