= The Sacred Heart Review =

The Sacred Heart Review was an American Catholic newspaper published in Boston and Cambridge, Massachusetts, from 1888 to 1918. It reported news from the local to the international, and had subscribers across the country. It reported on the Catholic Church as a whole as well as on the New England church.

David Richtmyer, librarian and cataloger of rare books at the John J. Burns Library at Boston College, oversaw the process of scanning and digitizing the newspaper, which was published weekly, and collected in two volumes per year. He notes that the newspaper was published during the "golden age" of Catholicism in America, and that its coverage was much more broad than just Catholic matter; it also editorialized against anti-German sentiment in the early 20th century. Many American Catholics were of Irish descent, and so were many of the subscribers; the paper contained much information for and advertisements directed at Irish Americans. The entire run of the newspaper is available through the John J. Burns Library.
