= Cumberland County Courthouse (Maine) =

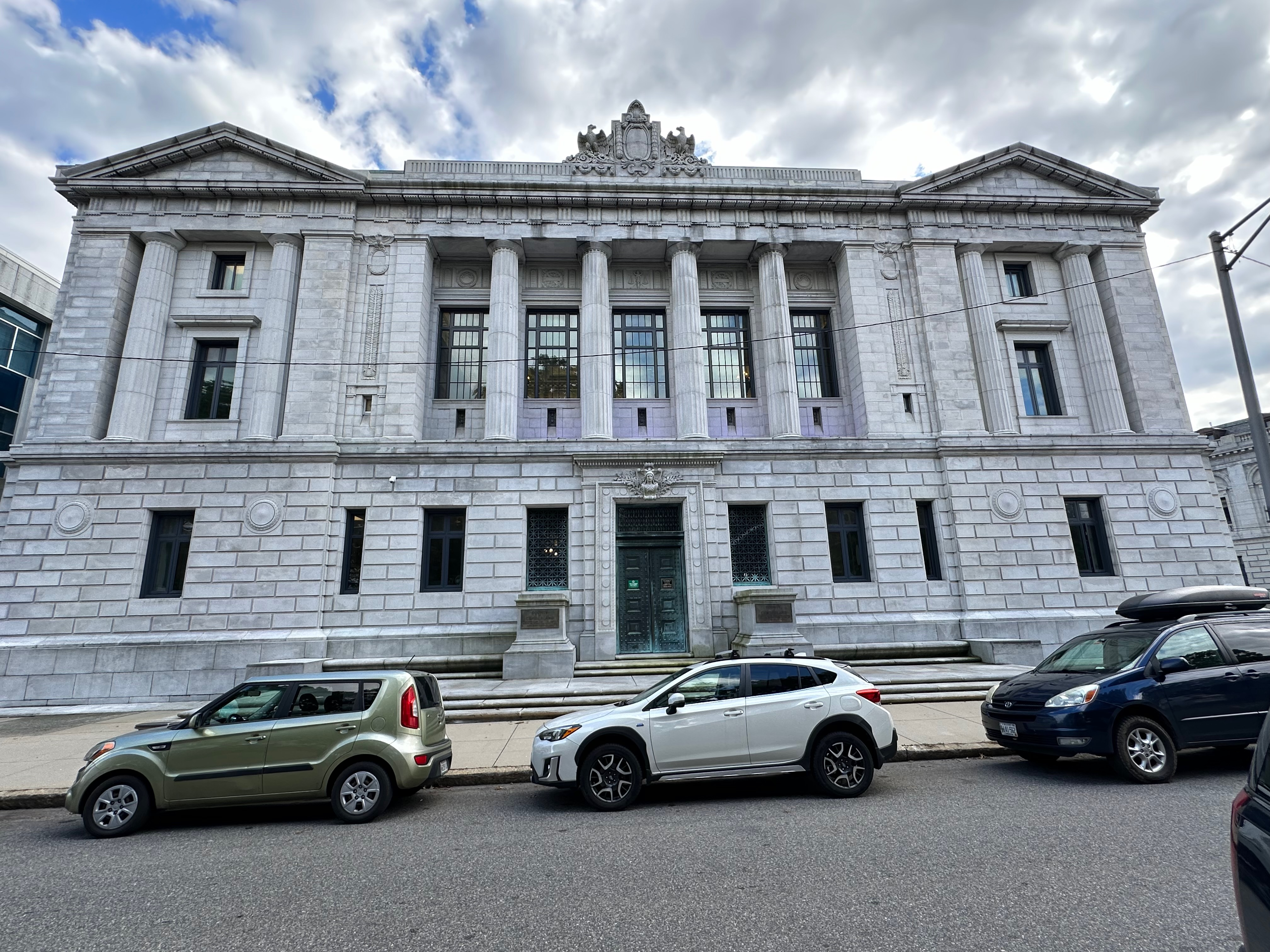
- The Federal Street frontage in 2023, viewed from the eastern side of Lincoln Park
- Interactive map of the Cumberland County Courthouse area

General information
- Location: Portland, Maine, U.S., 205 Newbury Street
- Coordinates: 43.65933°N 70.25395°W
- Completed: 1910 (116 years ago)

Design and construction
- Architects: George Burnham; Guy Lovell

The Cumberland County Courthouse is a courthouse building located in Portland, Maine, United States. Its main façade is on Federal Street, on the eastern side of Lincoln Park, and across Pearl Street from the Edward T. Gignoux United States Courthouse; its entrance is now at the rear of the property, at 205 Newbury Street.

Designed by local architect George Burnham, in partnership with Boston architect Guy Lowell, it was completed in 1910 and constructed in granite. The courts were formerly located in Portland City Hall, prior to its burning down in 1908.

An addition to the rear of the building, completed in 1991, was dedicated in honor of Vincent L. McKusick, chief justice of the Maine Supreme Judicial Court between 1977 and 1992.
