= Agora Grand Event Center =

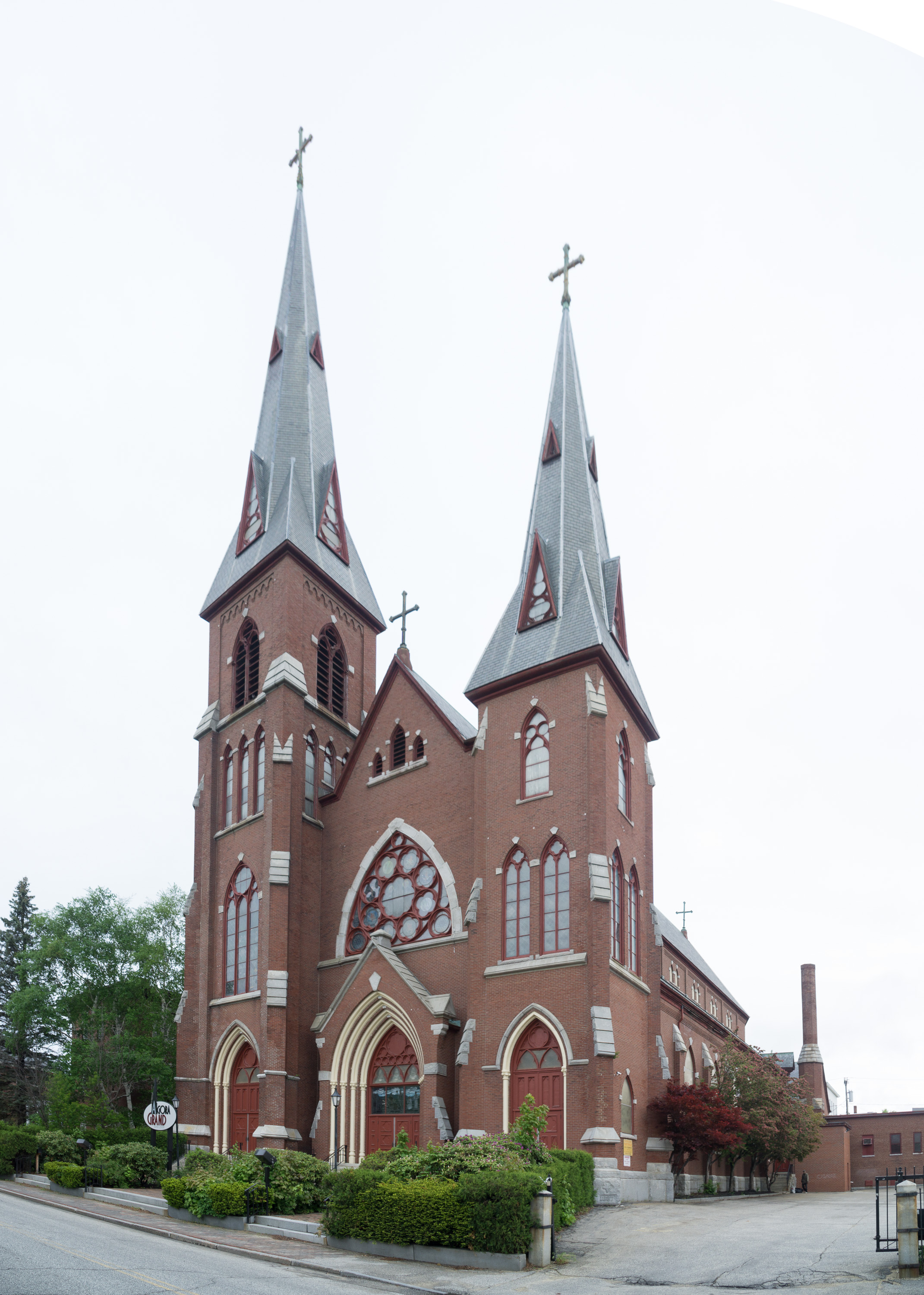
- Interactive map of the Agora Grand Event Center area
- Former names: St. Patrick's Church

General information
- Type: Event center
- Location: 220 Bates Street, Lewiston, Maine,
- Coordinates: 44.094837°N 70.212183°W
- Construction started: 1887
- Completed: 1890
- Owner: Andrew Knight

Design and construction
- Architect: Patrick Keely

The Agora Grand Event Center is a large event venue in Lewiston, Maine. It is also the second-tallest building in the state.

== Description and history ==
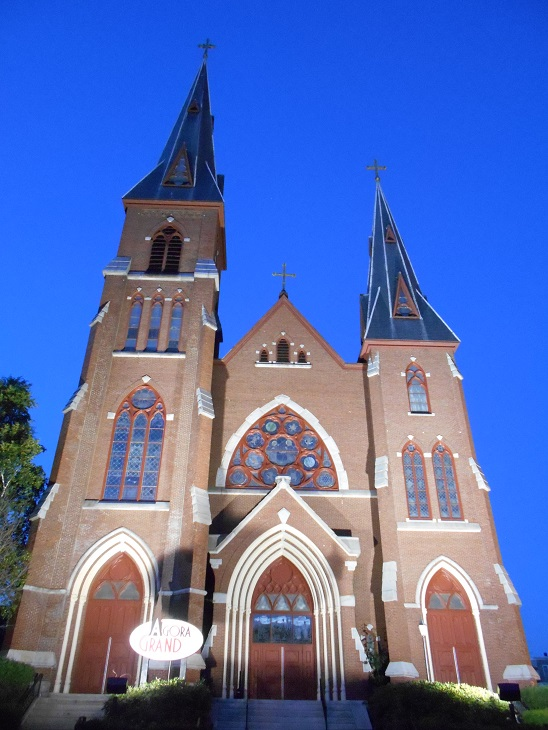
Night view

The Agora Grand was created by renovating the former St. Patrick's Church, a Roman Catholic church whose cornerstone was laid on July 24, 1887, by the Right Reverend Bishop Healy and last Mass was held in October 2009. At 220 feet to its taller spire, it is the second-tallest building in Maine, based on the definition of "height to architectural top" by the Council on Tall Buildings and Urban Habitat.

It was purchased in March 2014, by developer Andrew Knight, who opened the Agora Grand in May 2016. Knight received an award from the Lewiston Historic Preservation Board for his work in reviving the building; his wedding was the first held at the renovated building.

In 2014, Knight converted the former St. Patrick's Church Rectory, also known as the Albert Kelsey Mansion, into a boutique hotel. The former church contains a mortuary chapel and basement crypt in which the church's original builder and priest, Monsignor Thomas Wallace, was buried from 1906 to 2007, when his body was exhumed and moved to Mt. Hope Cemetery. In 2015, Knight converted the former crypt into a novelty annex of the Inn at the Agora, purportedly the world's first "crypt hotel room."

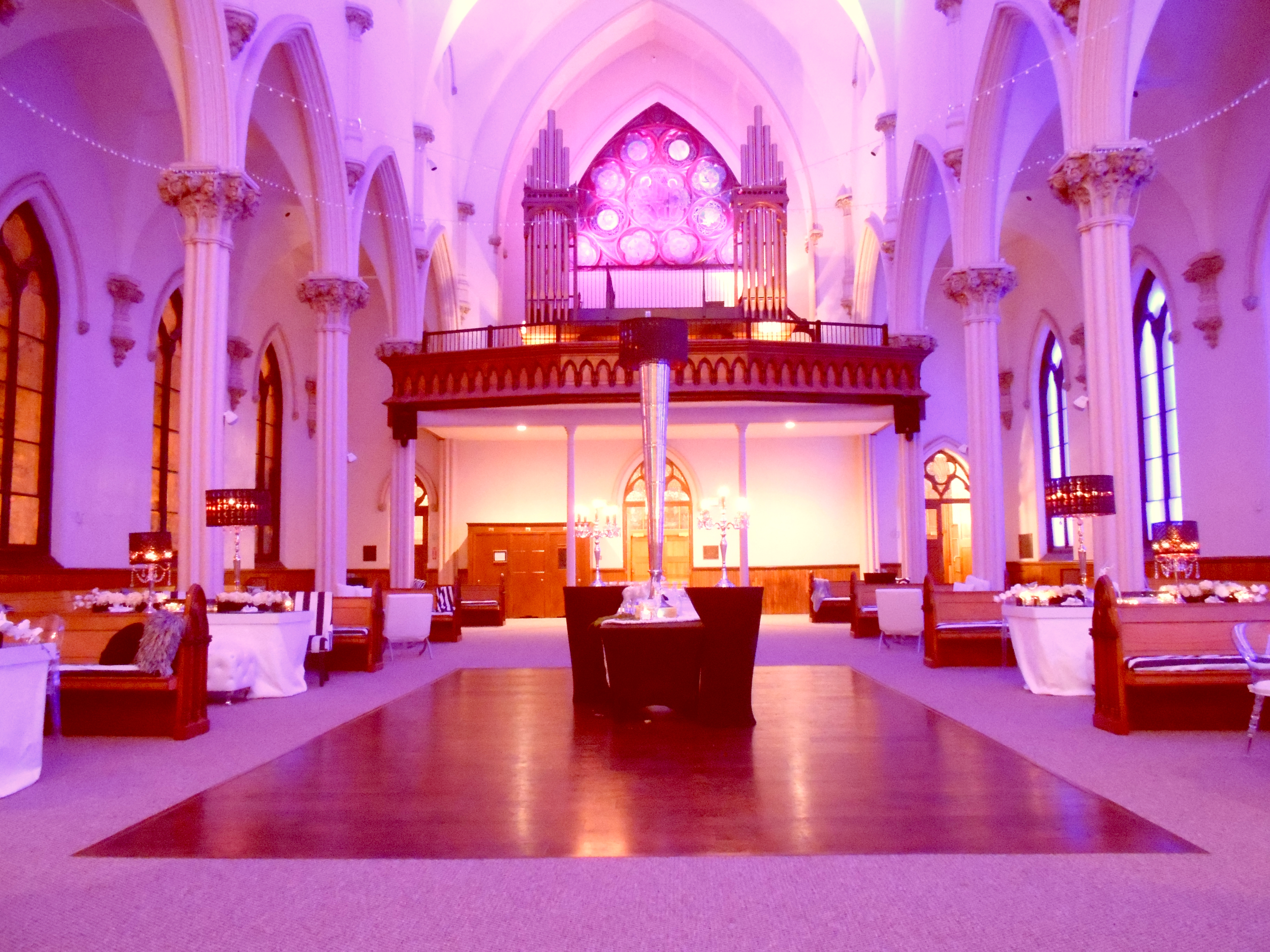
The Reception Hall inside the Agora Grand Event Center

== 1896 description ==
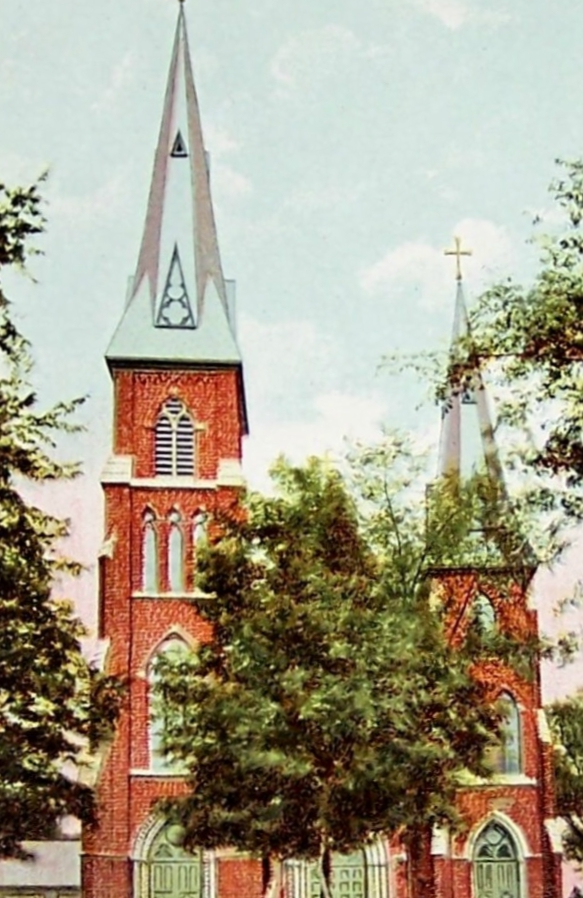
1910 postcard of the former St. Patrick's Church

An 1896 account in The Sacred Heart Review describes the structure:

St. Patrick's Church, a beautiful Gothic structure of brick, with rockfaced granite foundations, has an unsurpassed situation, as it faces directly on the public park and stands commandingly over the lower levels of the city, surmounted as it is by two graceful spires that rise to heights of 220 and 160 feet respectively. It is 180 feet long and 65 feet wide, and has a comfortable seating capacity of 1,000. It is a seven-bay edifice, its brick buttresses being doubly barged in cut granite; and the side walls are further trimmed in white North Jay granite at the springs and tips of the window-arches.

== See also ==
- List of tallest buildings by U.S. state and territory
- List of tallest buildings in Maine
