= Franklin Towers =

Coordinates: 43°39′41″N 70°15′22″W

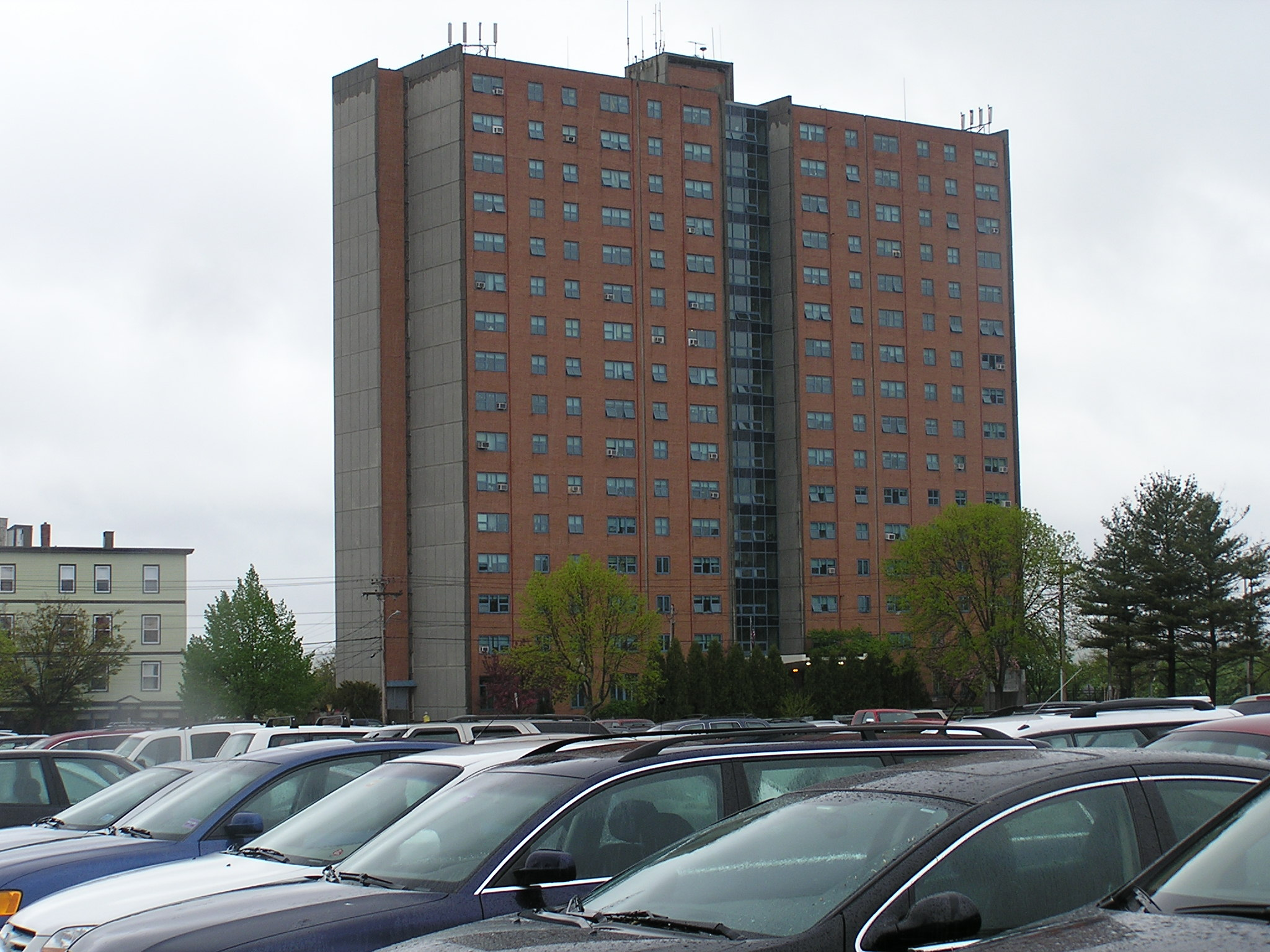
The Franklin Tower seen from City Hall parking lot.

Franklin Towers is a 16-story high-rise building located in Portland, Maine, at the corner of Franklin Street and Cumberland Avenue, rising to a height of 175 feet (53 m). Construction was completed in 1969, and its primary use is residential. It was listed on the National Register of Historic Places in 2024.

It affords residency, administered by the Portland Housing Authority (PHA), to people who meet criteria such as retirement age, disability, and limited income. Through PHA, residents pay up to 30% of their adjusted income for rent. Until 2023, when it was overtaken by 201 Federal Street, it was the tallest residential building in Maine.

== See also ==
- National Register of Historic Places listings in Portland, Maine
- List of tallest buildings in Maine
