= Gardiner Historic District =

Gardiner Historic District and variations may refer to:

- Gardiner Historic District (Gardiner, Maine)
- Gardiner Historic District (Gardiner, Oregon)
- Gardiner Place Historic District, Walton, New York
- Smith–Gardiner–Norman Farm Historic District, Middletown, Rhode Island
