= Senator Dow =

Senator Dow may refer to:

- Albert G. Dow (1808–1908), New York State Senate
- Chuck Dow (1931–2015), Maine State Senate
- Dana Dow (fl. 1960s–2010s), Maine State Senate
