= Alton Morgan =

American politician (1932–2022)

Alton E. Morgan (June 3, 1932 – March 16, 2022) was an American accountant and politician in Maine.

Morgan was born in Gardiner, Maine. He was raised in Randolph, Maine, and graduated from Gardiner High School. Morgan went to Georgetown University and graduated from University of Southern Maine. He served in the United States Air Force and served as an accountant. Morgan served on the South Portland School Board. He also served in the Maine House of Representatives in 1997 and 1998 and was a Democrat. He died at Seaside Skilled Rahab Center in Portland, Maine. Morgan died on March 16, 2022, at the age of 89.
