= Peacock Tavern =

Historic tavern in Maine, United States

- U.S. National Register of Historic Places
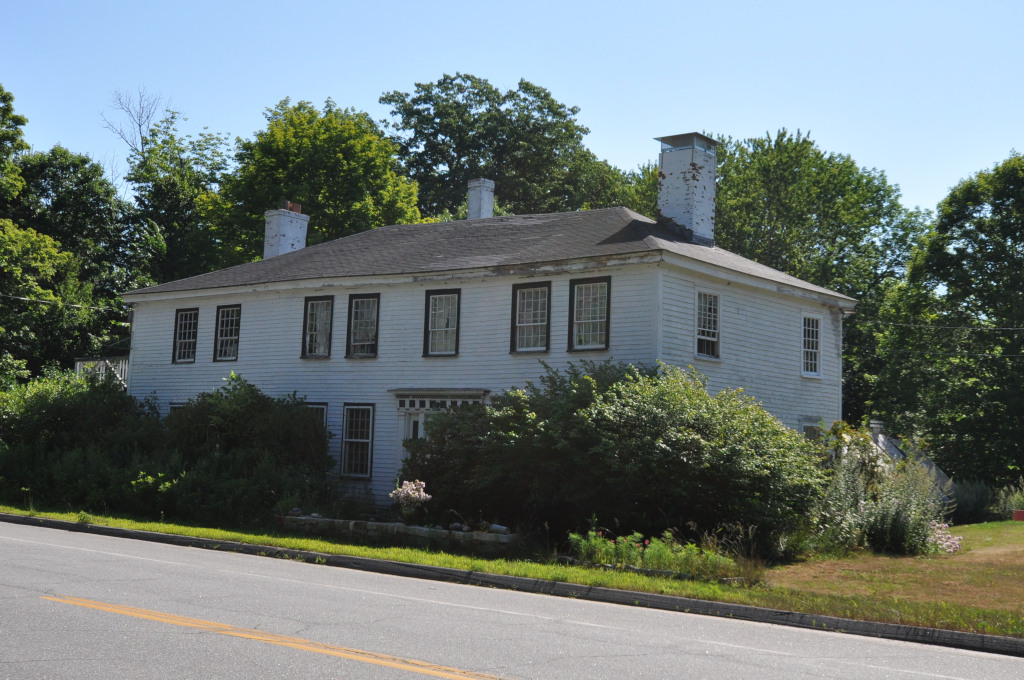

- Location within Maine Location within the United States
- Location: 1037 US 201, Richmond, Maine
- Coordinates: 44°9′33″N 69°51′42″W
- Area: 0.5 acres (0.20 ha)
- Built: 1807
- NRHP reference No.: 86000675
- Added to NRHP: April 4, 1986

The Peacock Tavern is a historic, Federal tavern building at 1037 United States Route 201 in Richmond, Maine. Built in 1807, it is one of the rural community's oldest surviving buildings, and has long been a landmark on what was once the main road between Augusta and Portland. It was listed on the National Register of Historic Places in 1986. It was owned by the state, forming part of Peacock Beach State Park, but was sold to private owners in 1987.

== Description ==
The Peacock Tavern stands on the east side of US 201 in rural Richmond, above Pleasant Pond and opposite the entrance to Peacock Beach State Park. It is a two-story wood-frame structure, with a hip roof and clapboard siding. It is seven bays wide, with a typical five-bay facade augmented by asymmetrically placed windows to the left. The front entrance is flanked by sidelight windows and pilasters, and topped by a decorative carved entablature and dentillated cornice. The interior contains well-preserved but simple Federal period woodwork, including wood paneling, fireplace mantels, and wainscoting. The main stair's newel post is a 20th-century reproduction.

== History ==
The tavern was built in 1807, along what was historically the post road leading south from Augusta. It was built by Benjamin Shaw. Previously Shaw operated a store on the shoreline near where Cobbosseecontee Stream meets Pleasant Pond. Shaw sold the tavern to Edward Peacock, from whom it acquired its name. The two-bay ell, which extends the building to the left and rear, was added later in the 19th century. Due to the fact that town boundaries changed and the land was not well surveyed, Peacock Tavern has in the past been part of the towns of Pittston, Litchfield, and Bowdoinham. In the early 1820s where the tavern is situated became part of Richmond. When the railroad reached the Kennebec Valley, travelers on the post road decreased for a time. The automobile era revived Peacock Tavern as a roadhouse and Peacock Beach as a travel and tourist destination. Later, the tavern was owned by the state of Maine forming part of Peacock Beach State Park. The state sold the tavern in 1987 to Dennis and Susan Cloukey, who owned it until 1990. In 1993, it was purchased by Christine and Christopher Faris.

== See also ==
- National Register of Historic Places listings in Sagadahoc County, Maine
