= Dr. Silvester Gardiner =

1772 painting by John Singleton Copley

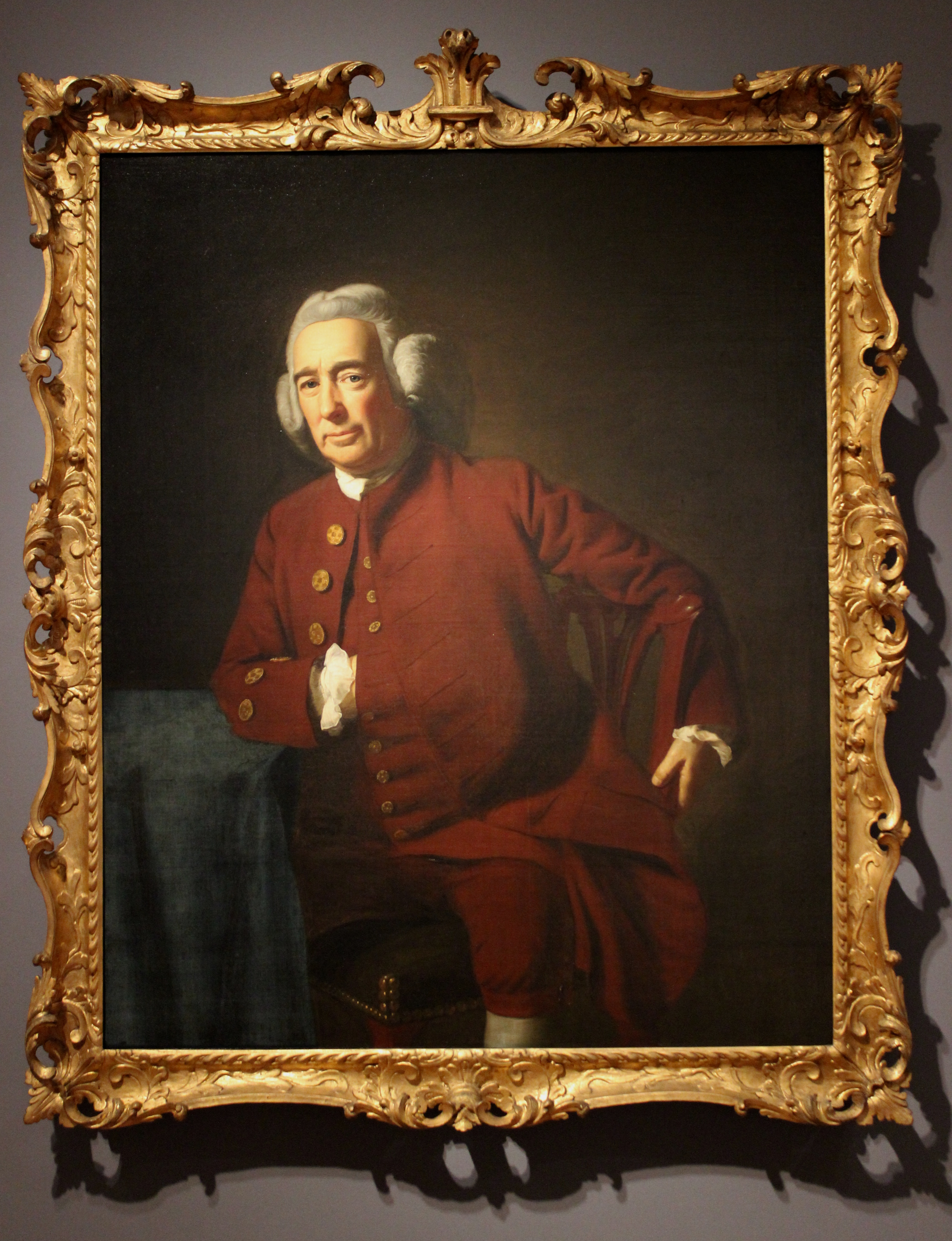
- Artist: John Singleton Copley
- Year: ca. 1772
- Medium: oil on canvas
- Subject: Silvester Gardiner
- Dimensions: 127 cm × 101.6 cm (50 in × 40.0 in)
- Location: Seattle Art Museum, Seattle, Washington, U.S.

Dr. Silvester Gardiner is an oil painting on canvas completed ca. 1772 by the Anglo-American artist John Singleton Copley. The subject of the portrait, Silvester Gardiner, was a physician who founded the city of Gardiner, Maine.

The painting is part of the collection of the Seattle Art Museum.
