= United States Post Office (Walton, New York) =

- US Post Office-Walton
- U.S. National Register of Historic Places
- U.S. Historic district – Contributing property
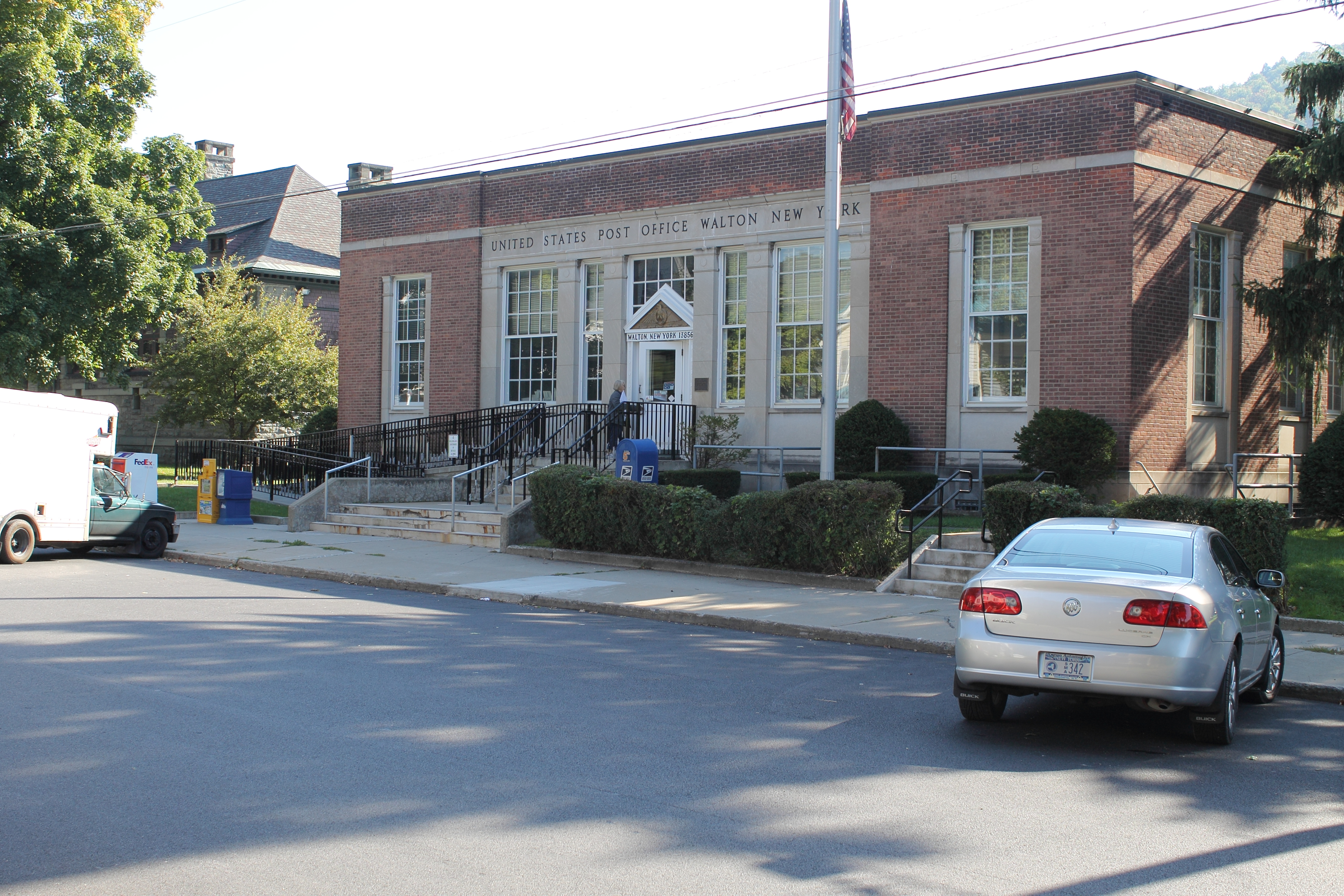

- Location within New York Location within the United States
- Location: 34-36 Gardner Pl., Walton, New York
- Coordinates: 42°10′9″N 75°7′42″W
- Area: less than one acre
- Built: 1936
- Architect: Simon, Louis A.; US Treasury Department
- Architectural style: Colonial Revival
- MPS: US Post Offices in New York State, 1858-1943, TR
- NRHP reference No.: 88002439
- Added to NRHP: May 11, 1989

US Post Office-Walton is a historic post office building located at Walton in Delaware County, New York, United States. It was built in 1936–1937, and is one of a number of post offices in New York State designed by the Office of the Supervising Architect of the Treasury Department, Louis A. Simon. It is a one-story, five-bay, steel frame building on a raised limestone clad foundation in the Colonial Revival style. The front section is symmetrically massed and features a slightly recessed, three bay central entrance.

It was listed on the National Register of Historic Places in 1989. It is located in the Gardiner Place Historic District.

== See also ==
- National Register of Historic Places listings in Delaware County, New York
