= Morton A. Read =

American Civil War Medal of Honor recipient

First Lieutenant Morton. A. Read
- Born: c. 1843; Brockport, New York
- Died: 10 July 1921; Danville, Illinois
- Burial place: Danville National Cemetery
- Military career
- Allegiance: United States (Union)
- Branch: Army
- Rank: First Lieutenant
- Units: Company D, 8th New York Cavalry
- Conflicts: Battle of Appomattox Station
- Awards: Medal of Honor

Morton A. Read (c. 1843 – 10 July 1921) was a first lieutenant in the United States Army who was awarded the Medal of Honor for gallantry during the American Civil War. On 8 April 1865, during the Battle of Appomattox Station, Read captured the flag of the 1st Texas Infantry of the Confederate Army. He was issued the Medal of Honor on 3 May 1865.

== Personal life ==
Read was born in Brockport, Monroe County, New York in about 1843. He married Eugenia Smith Read (1850–1945) and had one son, Edward D. Reed (1872–1947). He died on 10 July 1921 in Danville, Vermilion County, Illinois, and is buried in Danville National Cemetery.

== Military service ==
Read entered service in Brockport and served with Company D of the 8th New York Cavalry Regiment. On 8 April 1865, during the Battle of Appomattox Station, Read captured the flag of the 1st Texas Infantry of the Confederate Army.
