= Pleasant Pond =

Pond and stream in the Maine

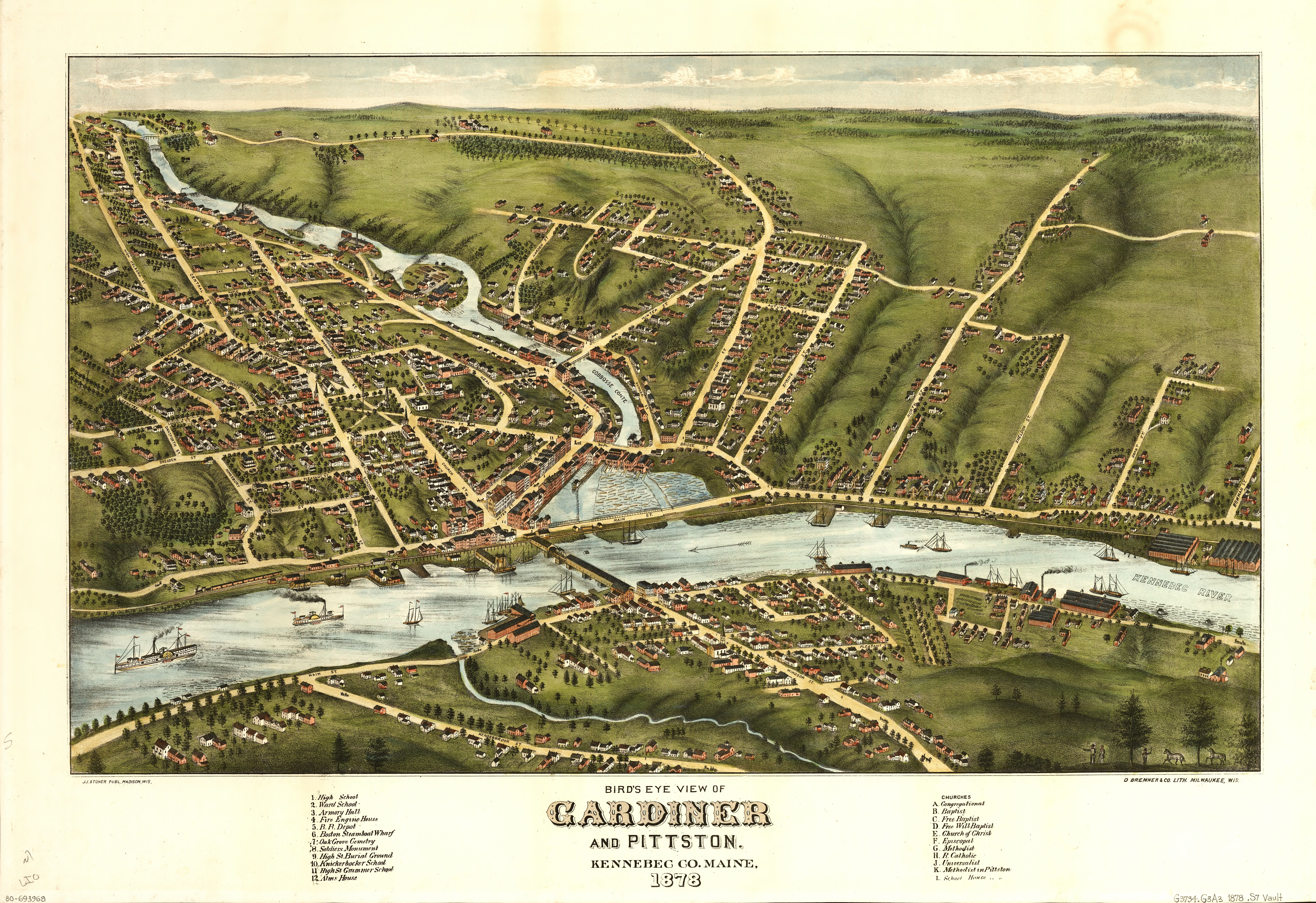
An 1878 map that shows part of Cobbosseecontee Stream in Gardiner where the stream joins the Kennebec River and where the Gardiner Historic District is located.

Pleasant Pond (Cobbosseecontee Stream) is a waterway in Maine that connects Cobbosseeconte Lake with the Kennebec River and includes the Horseshore Pond and the Upper Pond. The pond and stream have shoreline in the towns of Gardiner, Litchfield, Richmond, West Gardiner, and Manchester and played a significant role in the 18th century development of Gardiner. The word Cobbosseecontee translates to "plenty of sturgeon" in Abenaki. The Pleasant Pond – Cobbosseecontee Stream Lake Association is a membership organization of lakeside property owners.

== Physical characteristics ==
The surface area of the pond is 797 acres, and the length of the stream is 20 miles. The water level of the pond is controlled by the New Mills Dam in Gardiner. The first mile and a half of Cobbosseecontee Stream from Cobbosseecontee Lake to Pleasant Pond has 200 feet of class II whitewater.

Cottages line portions of the shoreline. Other portions of the shoreline are undeveloped and contain abundant wildlife. Wildlife on Pleasant Pond (Cobbosseecontee Stream) include eagles, black ducks, great egrets, cormorants, merlin, ospreys, beavers, and muskrats.

== History ==
Abenaki people camped at The Rips on the stream, which was part of an Abenaki trail running from the Kennebec River to Moosehead Lake. Pleasant Pond was mapped in 1765 by the Plymouth Company. Benjamin Shaw operated a store on the shoreline near where Cobbosseecontee Stream meets Pleasant Pond until 1807, when he moved it to what is now Peacock Tavern on the post road. In 1864, cottages had begun to be built on the shoreline, and by 1899 there were 25 cottages on the pond and stream.

== New Mills Dam ==
The New Mills Dam in Gardiner controls the water level in the upstream section of Pleasant Pond (Cobbosseeconte Stream) and the flood risk in the Gardiner Historic District downstream. The New Mills Dam Committee is charged with the oversight and maintenance of the dam. The committee members are appointed by the cities of Gardiner, Litchfield, and Richmond. In 2014, the towns conducted $70,000 in repairs to the dam.

== Sites of interest ==
There are many historical sites and sites of interest on Pleasant Pond (Cobbosseeconte Stream).

- The Gardiner Historic District grew around the mouth of Cobbosseeconte Stream where it empties into the Kennebec River, with industries powered by a series of waterfalls on the stream, and facilitated by the ease of transport on the river.
- Gardiner Station is a historic former railroad station built in 1911 by the Maine Central Railroad it stands just north of the mouth of Cobbosseecontee Stream.
- Peacock Beach is a public beach on Pleasant Pond managed by the town of Richmond. It provides swimming and picnicking areas. Peacock Beach is open from dawn until dusk from Memorial Day through Labor Day.
- Peacock Tavern is the historic tavern building across from the entrance to Peacock Beach on Route 201.
- Thorofare Road boat launch is a boat launch in Litchfield with access to both the Upper Pond and Pleasant Pond.
- Webber-Rogers Farmstead Conservation Area is a 117-acre nature preserve in Litchfield with more than 2,000 feet of shoreline on the Upper Pond with public trails for hiking and cross-country skiing.
- Wakefield Wildlife Sanctuary is a 113-acre nature preserve in West Gardiner with more than 4,000 feet of shoreline on Cobbosseeconte Stream with public trails for hiking and cross-country skiing. There are two historic cabins in Wakefield Sanctuary that are powered by solar panels and that are rented to help fund the maintenance of the sanctuary.
