= Vivian Blanche Small =

American educational leader

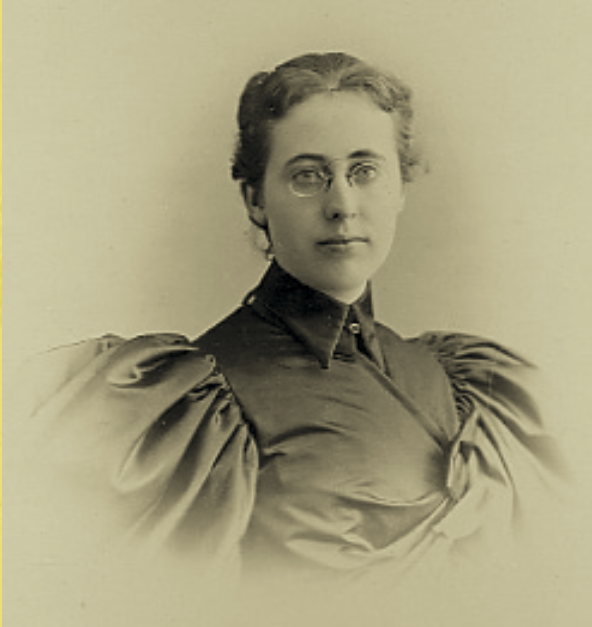
- Smith in 1896
- Born: September 17, 1875; Gardiner, Maine, U.S.
- Died: May 15, 1946 (aged 70); Portland, Maine, U.S.
- Education: Mount Holyoke College; University of Chicago; Case Western Reserve University
- Occupation: Educator
- Known for: President, Lake Erie College (1909–1941)

Vivian Blanche Small (1875–1946) was an American educational leader. For 32 years, she served as the fourth president of Lake Erie College; in 1941, upon her retirement, she was bestowed the title, President Emeritus.

== Early life and education ==
Vivian Blanche Small was born in Gardiner, Maine, September 17, 1875. Her parents were Leander Marshall and Annie Blanche (Payne) Small.

Small graduated in 1892 from Gardiner High School. She earned a B.A. degree from Mount Holyoke College (Classics, 1896); M.A. degree from the University of Chicago (Latin, 1905); Litt.D. from Mount Holyoke College in 1912; and an LL.D. from Case Western Reserve University in 1913.

== Career ==
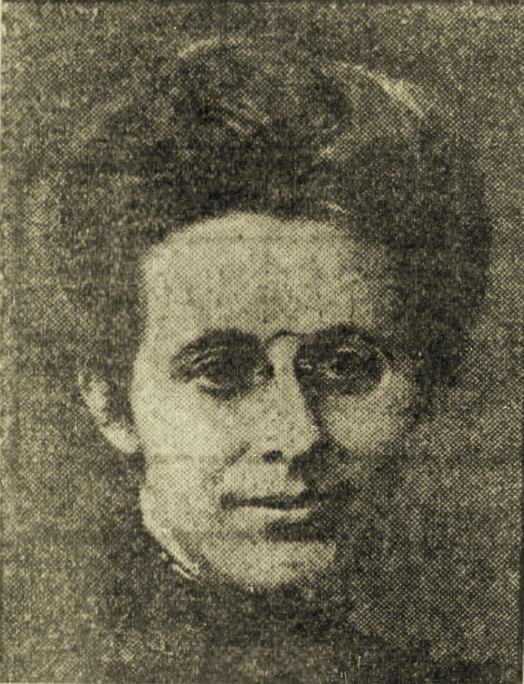
Smith in 1912

Her early career included teaching at Gorham High School, Gorham, Maine, 1897-1899; and at Howe School, Billerica, Massachusetts, 1899–1901. At Mount Holyoke College, she served as Assistant in Latin, 1901–02; instructor, 1902–08; associate professor, Latin, 1908–09; and head of Mead Hall, 1907–09. On July 1, 1909, Small became president of Lake Erie College, retiring on September 1, 1941.

During the period of 1917–23, she served as an alumni trustee at Mount Holyoke.

== Personal life ==
In religion, she was a Congregationalist.

During her tenure at Lake Eric College, Small resided in Painesville, Ohio. In 1941, 5 short pieces for girls chorus (1941), by Julius Hijman, lyrics by Carl Sandburg, was dedicated to Small and the Lake Erie College Choir.

Vivian Blanche Small died at a nursing home in Portland, Maine, May 15, 1946.

== Selected works ==
- The Use of Nomen and Cognomen in the Poems of Catullus, 1905
