= Chuck Dow =

American businessman and politician

Charles G. Dow Sr. (August 15, 1931 – May 8, 2015) was an American businessman and politician.

Born in Gardiner, Maine, Dow graduated from Gardiner High School and Gates Business College. He served in the United States Air Force during the Korean War. Dow owned an insurance agency. Dow served in the Maine House of Representatives from 1971 to 1980 and the Maine State Senate from 1983 to 1990 and was a Democrat. He died in Augusta, Maine from cancer.
