= Frank Parker Stockbridge =

American editor and journalist

Frank Parker Stockbridge (June 11, 1870 – December 7, 1940) was an editor, journalist, and author in the United States. Born in Gardiner, Maine, Stockbridge was educated in Washington D.C. where he attended high school and studied medicine at George Washington University. After three years of study, he abandoned his university education to become a journalist at The Buffalo Express where he worked as a reporter and editorial writer from 1894-1901. He then worked predominantly as a reporter and editor for a variety of papers in New York City; including New York American (1902-1904), The New York Globe (1905-1907), and New York Herald (1907-1908). From 1908-1911 he was political editor of The Cincinnati Times-Star; a position he left to co-lead with Walter Hines Page the successful campaign to secure the 1912 Democratic Party presidential nomination for Woodrow Wilson.

In his later career, Stockbridge wrote a weekly syndicated newspaper column, "Today and Tomorrow", which was published by thousands of American newspapers. He also served as editor for a variety of American magazines, most notably Popular Mechanics from 1913-1915. He also contributed articles to several American newspapers and periodicals, and was the author or co-author of multiple non-fiction books.

== Life and career ==
The son of Reverend Winfield Scott Stockbridge and Mrs Emily Parker Stockbridge, Frank Parker Stockbridge was born on June 11, 1870 in Gardiner, Maine. His parents married in 1869 and his mother was the decedent of early colonists to New England. He received his high school education in Washington D. C. where he graduated in 1888. From 1888-1891 he studied medicine at George Washington University; but abandoned his college education in favor of a career as a journalist.

From 1894 to 1901 Stockbridge worked as a reporter and editorial writer for The Buffalo Express. In 1901 he was the editor for the official program of the Pan-American Exposition. That same year he founded American Home magazine; serving as that publication's first editor. He then moved to New York City where he worked at William Randolph Hearst's New York American as a reporter and staff correspondent from 1902 to 1904. In 1904 he was active in St. Lous as managing editor of the History of the Louisiana Purchase Exposition; a book that included more than 4,000 engravings and was partly an illustrated history of the St. Louis World's Fair in addition to containing other kinds of documentation. He then returned to New York where he worked as city editor at The New York Globe from 1905-1907 and then a reported for the New York Herald in 1907-1908.

In 1908 Stockbridge left New York for Ohio where he joined the staff of The Cincinnati Times-Star as the paper's politics editor; a post he held until March 1911 when he left to join Walter Hines Page as co-leaders of the publicity campaign to nominate Woodrow Wilson as the president of the United States. That campaign was successful; with Wilson securing the nomination with the 46th ballot at the 1912 Democratic National Convention. After this win, Stockbridge worked as editor of Town Development.

Stockbridge relocated to Chicago where he worked as the editor of Popular Mechanics magazine from 1913-1915. He then returned to New York when he was appointed both president and managing editor of New York Evening Mail; a position he held from 1915 to 1917. In 1918 he wrote about effort to secure employment for injured veterans in an article published in The New York Times. In his later career he worked as an editor at a variety of publications; including the magazine Old Colony, Co-operative Commonwealth, and The American Press. While managing editor of the latter trade magazine he was vice president of a committee organized by prominent American newspaper journalists to fight to protect the freedom of the press in the United States in 1931.

In his later career, Stockbridge wrote a weekly syndicated newspaper column, "Today and Tomorrow", which was published by thousands of newspapers in the United States, and contributed articles to numerous magazine publications; among them Saturday Evening Post. He was also a "prominent member of the American Society of News Editors".

Stockbridge died of heart disease at the age of 70 at his home in Stockbridge, Massachusetts on December 7, 1940.

== Partial list of publications ==
=== Books ===
- History of the Louisiana Purchase Exposition (1905, Universal Exposition Publishing Company; co-edited with Mark Bennitt with Stockbridge as managing editor)
- Measure Your Mind; The Mentimeter and How to Use It (1920, Doubleday, Page & Company; co-written with M. R. Trabue)
- Yankee Ingenuity in the War (1920, Harper & Brothers Publishers)
- Florida in the Making (1926, The De Bower Publishing Company; co-written with John Holliday Perry)

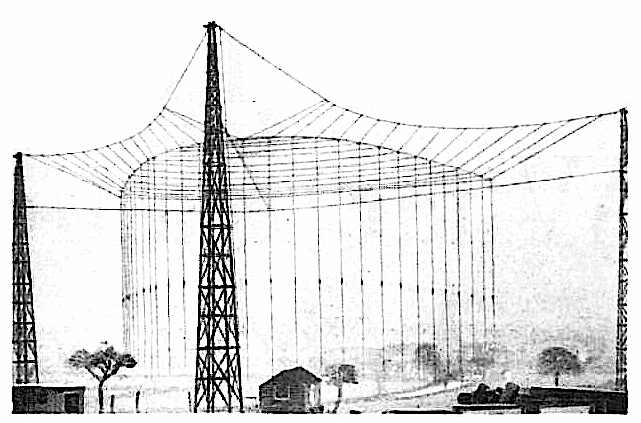
Guglielmo Marconi's parabolic shortwave antenna in 1922 in Hendon, UK

- So This is Florida (1938, John H. Perry Publishing Company; written with John Holliday Perry)
- Hedging Against Inflation (1939, Barron's)

=== Articles ===
- "Florida Rush of 1925", published in the November 1925 issue of Current History
- "Marcno Tells; What Radio Needs" about Guglielmo Marconi's experiments woth shorteave radio
