= Danville Branch, National Home for Disabled Volunteer Soldiers Historic District =

Historic district in Illinois, United States

- U.S. National Register of Historic Places
- U.S. Historic district
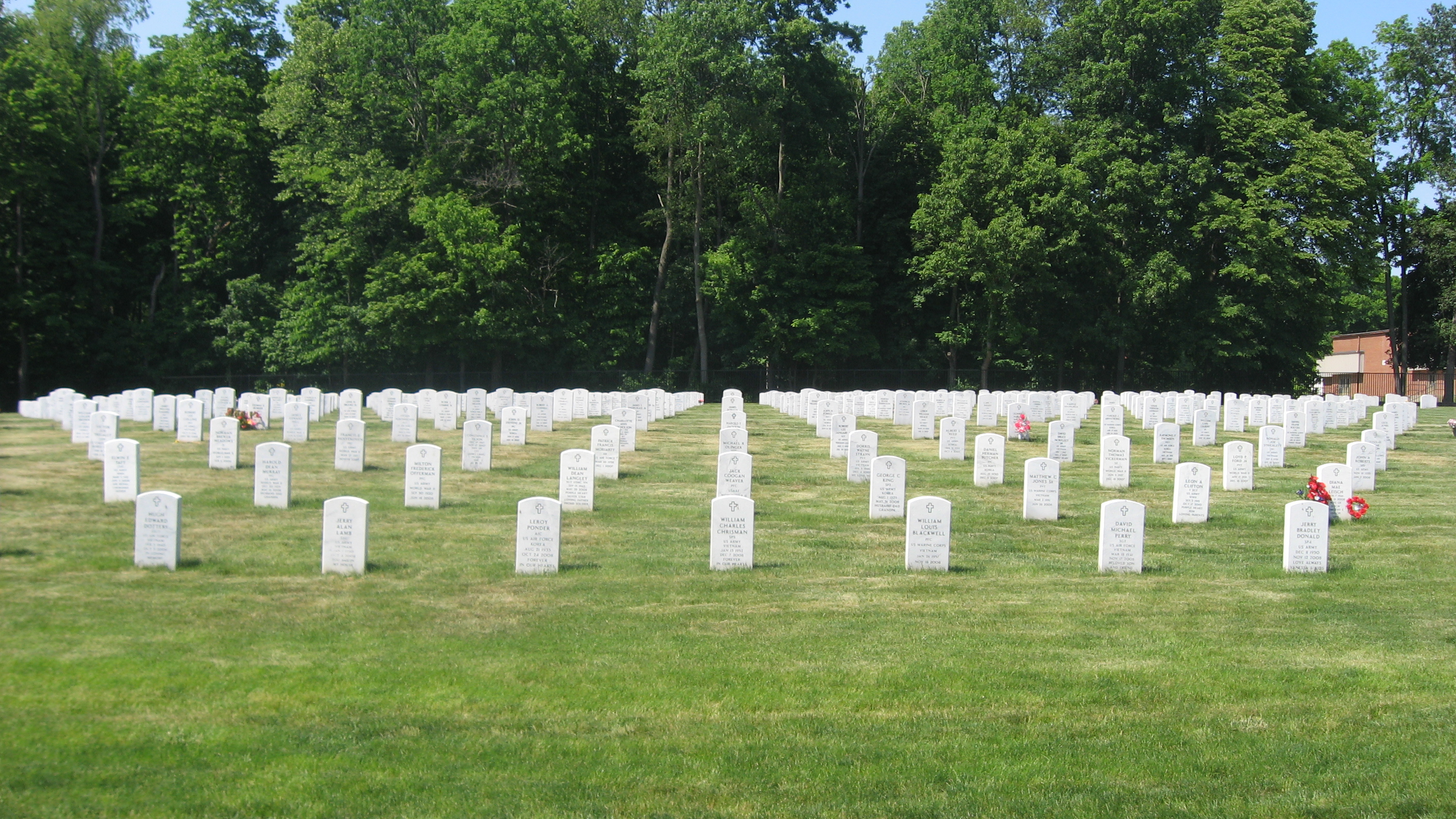
- Graves in Danville National Cemetery

- Location within Illinois Location within the United States
- Location: 1900 and 2000 E. Main St., Danville, Illinois
- Coordinates: 40°7′28″N 87°35′15″W
- Area: 297 acres (120 ha)
- Built: 1898
- Architectural style: Classical Revival, Georgian Revival, Late Gothic Revival
- NRHP reference No.: 91001973
- Added to NRHP: January 30, 1992

The Danville Branch, National Home for Disabled Volunteer Soldiers Historic District is the historic campus of a branch of the National Home for Disabled Volunteer Soldiers in Danville, Illinois. The branch, which opened in 1898, was one of eleven branches of the National Home, which formed in 1867 to treat Union soldiers disabled during the Civil War. U.S. Representative and Danville resident Joseph Gurney Cannon used his political influence to establish the Danville Branch, which brought money and jobs to the city. The campus served as both a medical facility and a planned community for the area's veterans, and it included housing, veteran-run shops, community halls, a school and library, and a chapel. Most of these buildings were designed in the Georgian Revival style; however, the library is a Classical Revival building, and the chapel has a Gothic Revival design. The campus also includes the Danville National Cemetery. The buildings remaining on the campus are presently divided between Danville's Veterans Affairs hospital and the Danville Area Community College.

The campus was added to the National Register of Historic Places on January 30, 1992.
