= William Clark Noble =

American sculptor (1858–1938)

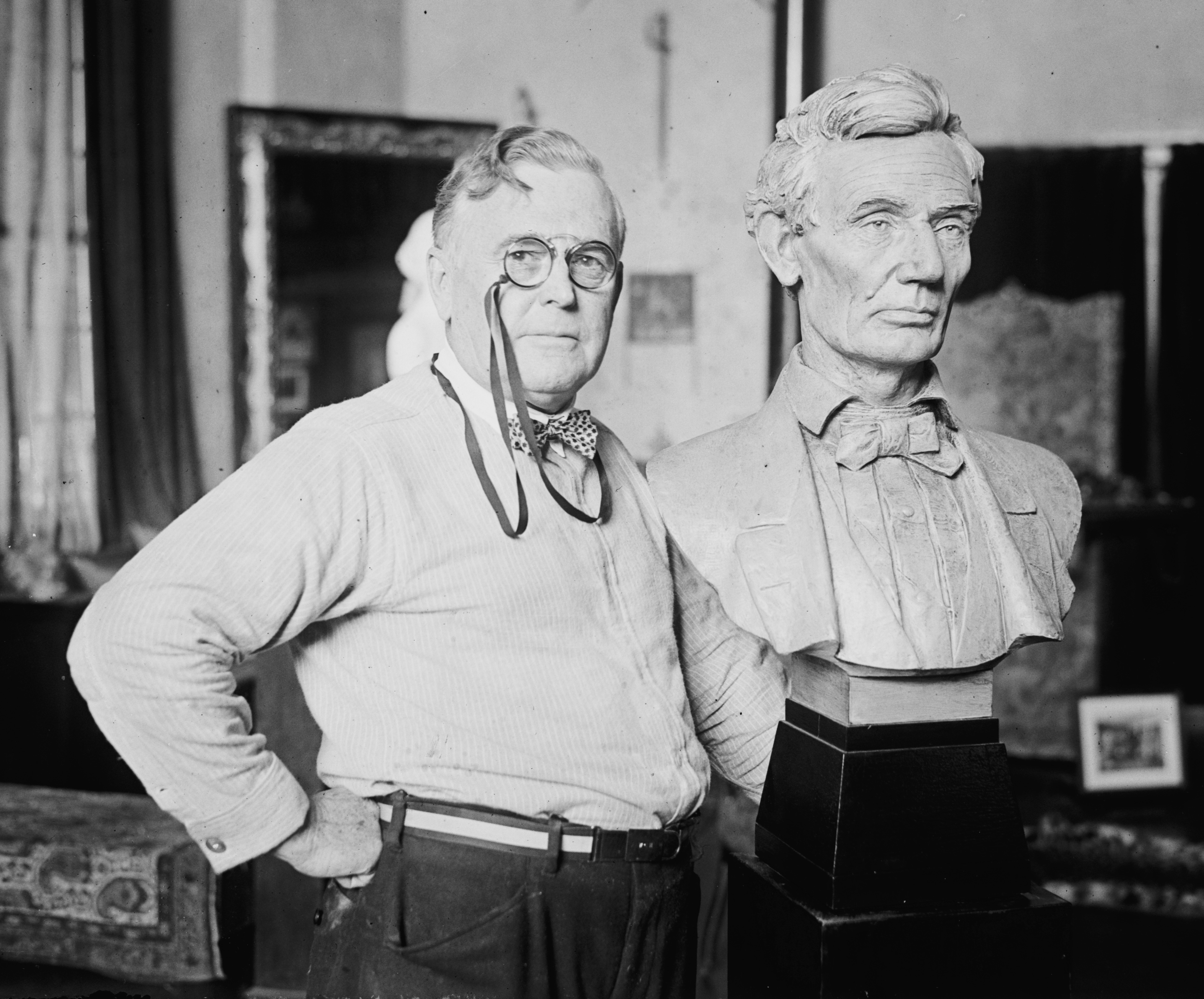
- Noble poses next to his bust of Lincoln, 1924
- Born: February 10, 1858; Gardiner, Maine, US
- Died: May 10, 1938 (aged 80); Washington, D.C., US
- Spouse: Emile Berlin Bleecker

William Clark Noble (February 10, 1858 – May 10, 1938) was an American sculptor best known for his monuments.

== Early life ==
Noble was born on February 10, 1858, in Gardiner, Maine. He was a son of Clark Noble, a ship’s captain, and Emma Freeman Noble, a descendant of Elder William Brewster, who came over on the Mayflower. After his father's death at sea, his mother, older brother, and infant Clark went to live on her father's farm in Richmond, Maine.

He studied with Horatio Greenough and Lorado Taft. Taft, in his History of American Sculpture, remarked that Noble was one of a group of sculptors who had, "made something of a specialty of military figures."

== Career ==
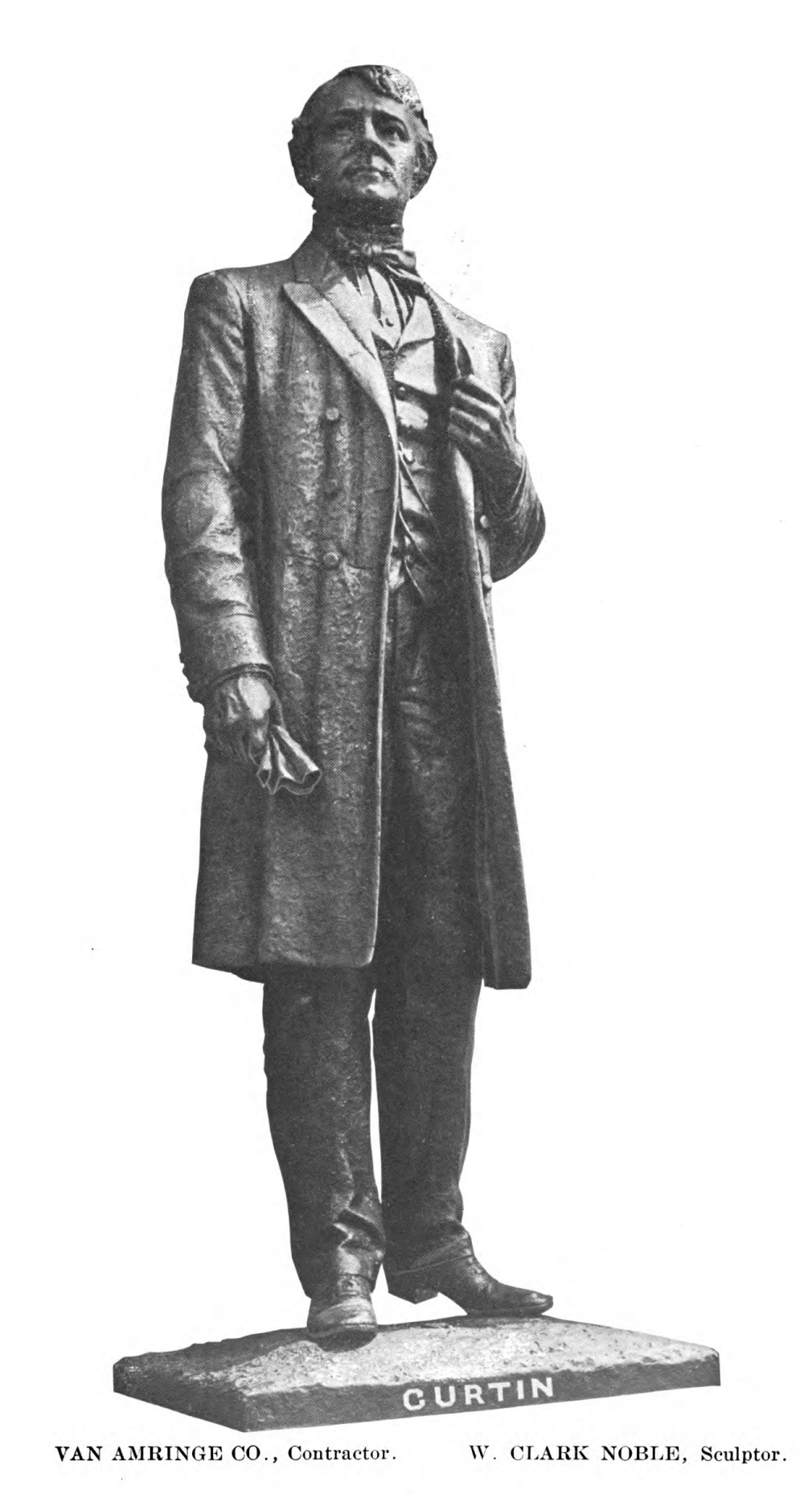
Governor Andrew Curtin (1911-13), Pennsylvania State Memorial, Gettysburg Battlefield

Noble designed coinage for Guatemala and Panama. His Guatemalan quetzal (1925) and Panamanian balboa (1931) each exchanged for one US dollar. In 1924, Noble was selected by the Woman's Universal Alliance to create the Mothers' Memorial to be erected in Washington, D.C., in honor of motherhood and the world's great women.

He was a member of the National Arts Club and the National Sculpture Society.

"His best-known works include the Soldiers and Sailors Monument in Newport, Rhode Island, and statues of Napoleon Bonaparte, Thomas Jefferson, and General 'Mad Anthony' Wayne for the 1904 Louisiana Purchase Exposition in St. Louis."

== Personal life ==
Noble was married three times, including his last marriage to the former Emile Berlin Bleecker. His son, William Clark Noble Jr., also became an artist.

Noble died on May 10, 1938, in Washington, D.C. He and his widow are buried in Mount Hope Cemetery in South Gardiner, Maine.

== Selected works ==
- Reverend Charles T. Brooks Memorial (1884), Channing Memorial Church, Newport, Rhode Island.
  - Bas-relief portrait of Reverend Charles T. Brooks (1884), Redwood Library and Athenaeum, Newport, Rhode Island.
- Bust of John McCullough as Virginius (1888), McCullough grave, Mount Moriah Cemetery, Philadelphia, Pennsylvania, John Lackme, architect.
- Old Salt – Bust of Captain James Logan (1890).
- Reverend William Ellery Channing (1892–93), Touro Park, Newport, Rhode Island.
- Joseph Jefferson Loving Cup (1895–96), New Orleans Museum of Art. Modeled in plaster by Noble, cast in silver by Gorham Manufacturing Company. Features three 10.5 in (26.7 cm) figures of Jefferson in the roles of Rip van Winkle, Dr. Pangloss, and Bob Acres. Auctioned at Sotheby's New York, 21 January 2011, Lot 127.
  - Statuette: Joseph Jefferson as Rip van Winkle (c. 1895). One of the figures from the loving cup.
- Lion and Eagle (1897–98), Commercial Cable Company Building, 20-22 Broad Street, Manhattan, New York City, George Edward Harding & Gooch, architects (demolished c. 1960). The bronze figures stood upon piers at the 5th story of the building's façade. They represented England and the United States – the two terminals of the Trans-Atlantic Telegraph Cable.
- Bishop Phillips Brooks Memorial (1898), Episcopal Church of the Incarnation, Manhattan, New York City. A full-length bronze bas-relief portrait with a glass mosaic background by Louis Comfort Tiffany.
- General Anthony Wayne (plaster, 1904). Exhibited at the Louisiana Purchase Exposition, St. Louis, Missouri. This and other larger-than-life statues of historical figures from the 1904 World's Fair decorated Pennsylvania Avenue during President Theodore Roosevelt's Inaugural parade, March 4, 1905.
- Monsignor Doane (1908), Doane Park, Newark, New Jersey.
- Minerva or Lady of Wisdom (gilded copper, 1909), Maine State House dome, Augusta, Maine. The 15-foot (4.5 m) finial figure stands atop the lantern of the 185-foot (56.4 m) State House.
- Lincoln the Candidate (Bust of Abraham Lincoln) (1909), private collection.
- Bas-relief portrait of Edward Everett Hale (1909), American Unitarian Association Library, Boston, Massachusetts.
- Bust of George Washington Carver (1910).
- Statuette: Honus Wagner (1910), Roman Bronze Works.
- Bas-relief portrait of Mary Baker Eddy (1913).
- Bas-relief portrait of Prime Minister David Lloyd George (1922).
- Portrait medallion of Charles William Eliot (1924), Fogg Museum, Harvard University. Diameter: 6 in (15.7 cm)

=== War memorials ===
- Newport Soldiers and Sailors Monument (1889–90), Congdon Park, Newport, Rhode Island.
- General Josiah Porter (1902), Van Cortlandt Park, Bronx, New York City.
  - A replica is on the grounds of the New York State Capitol, Albany.
- 50th Pennsylvania Volunteer Reserve Infantry Monument (1904), Antietam Battlefield, Sharpsburg, Maryland. The statue is a posthumous portrait of General Benjamin C. Christ.
- 100th Pennsylvania Volunteer Infantry "Roundheads" Monument (1904), Antietam Battlefield, Sharpsburg, Maryland.
  - A replica (1917) is at the Civil War Monument, Danville National Cemetery, Danville, Illinois.
- Civil War Memorial (1906), Centre County Courthouse, Bellefonte, Pennsylvania.
- Governor Andrew Curtin (bronze, 1911–13), Pennsylvania State Memorial, Gettysburg Battlefield, Pennsylvania.
  - A replica (c. 1913) was added to the Civil War Memorial, Bellefonte, Pennsylvania (Governor Curtin's home town).
  - A replica (1922) is at Governor Curtin Park, Harrisburg, Pennsylvania.
- Bas-relief: In Flanders's Fields (1919), World War I Memorial, Riverview Congregational Church, South Gardiner, Maine.
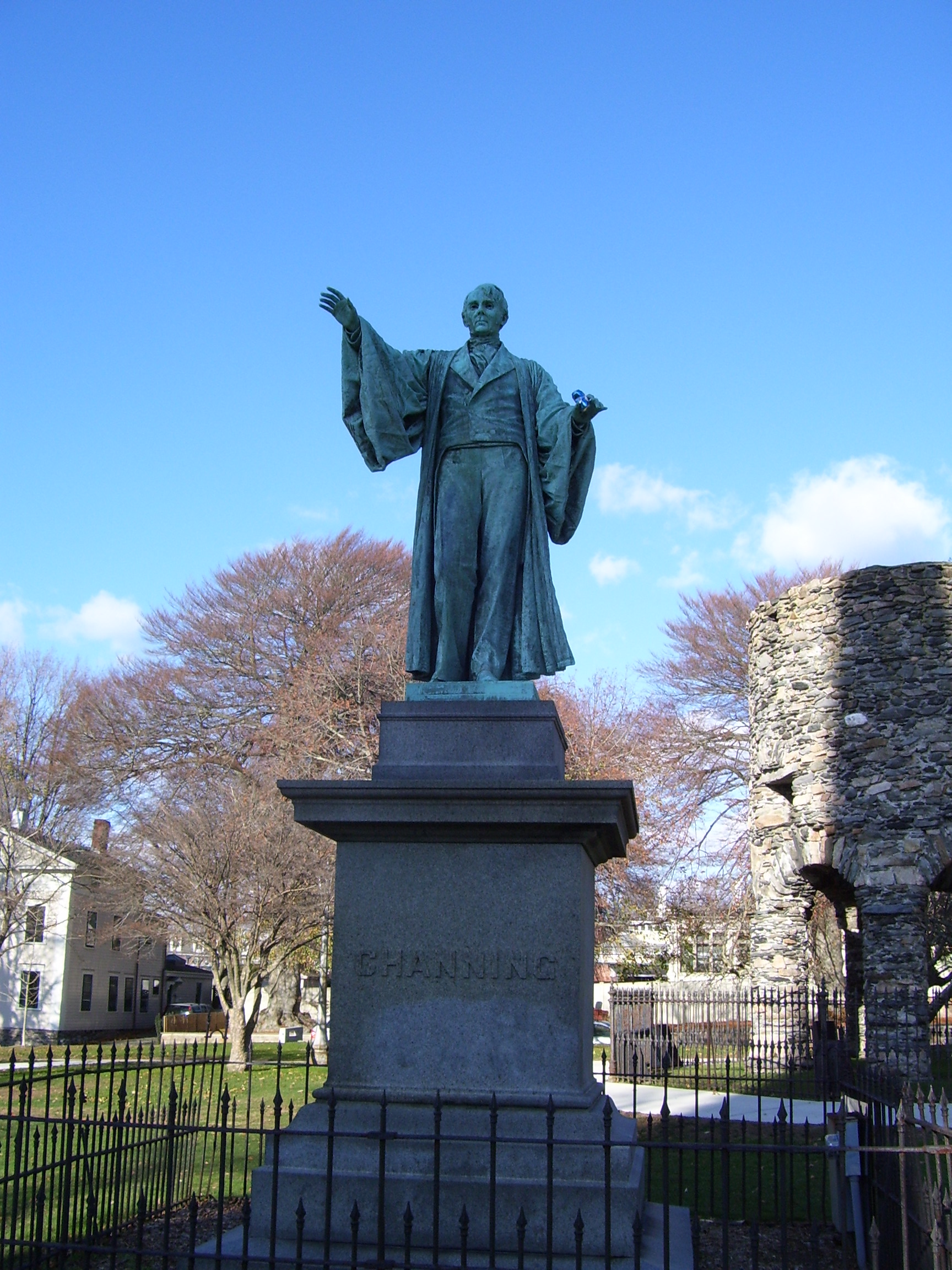
Reverend William Ellery Channing (1892–93), Newport, Rhode Island

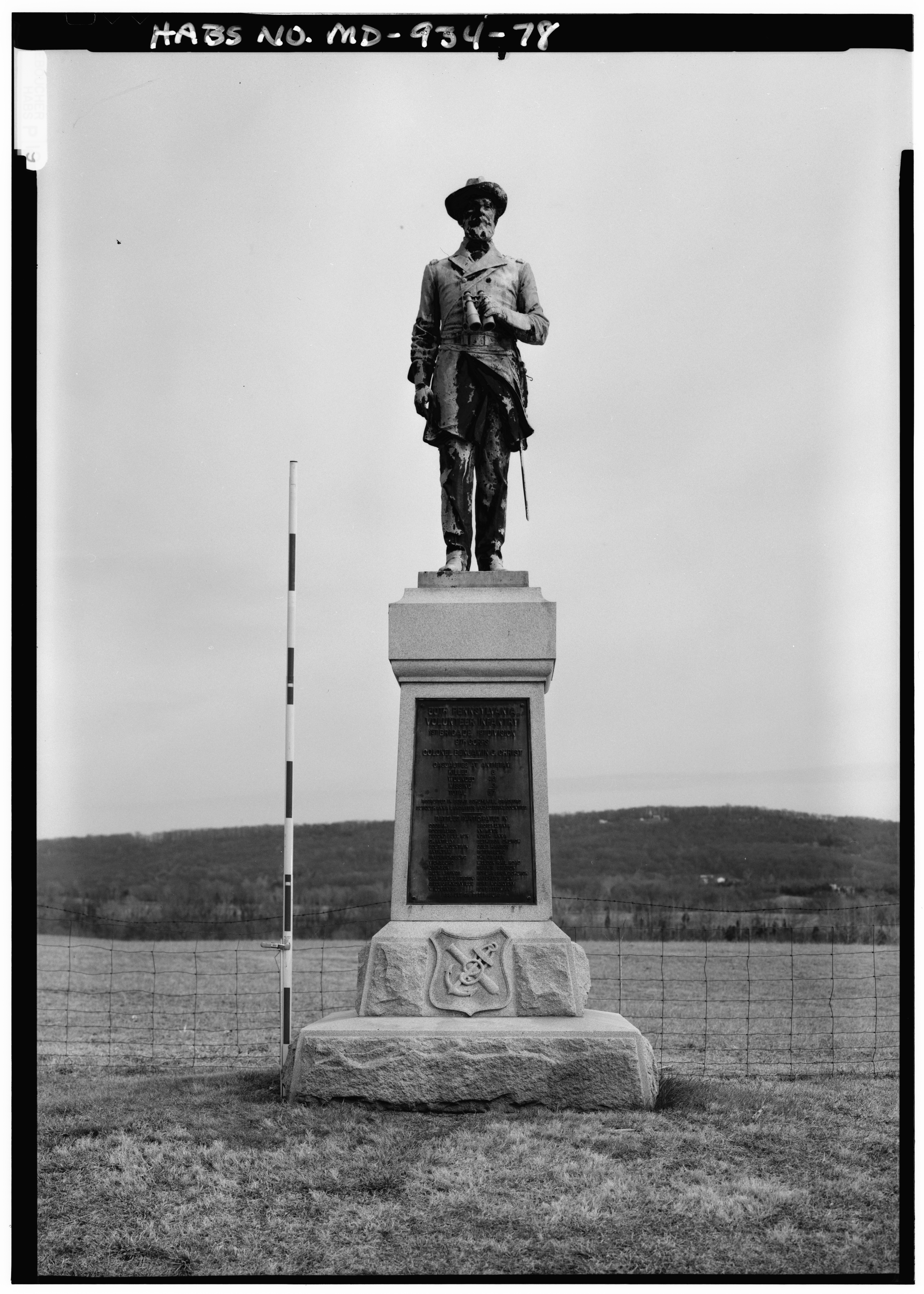
50th Pennsylvania Infantry Monument (1904), Antietam Battlefield, Maryland

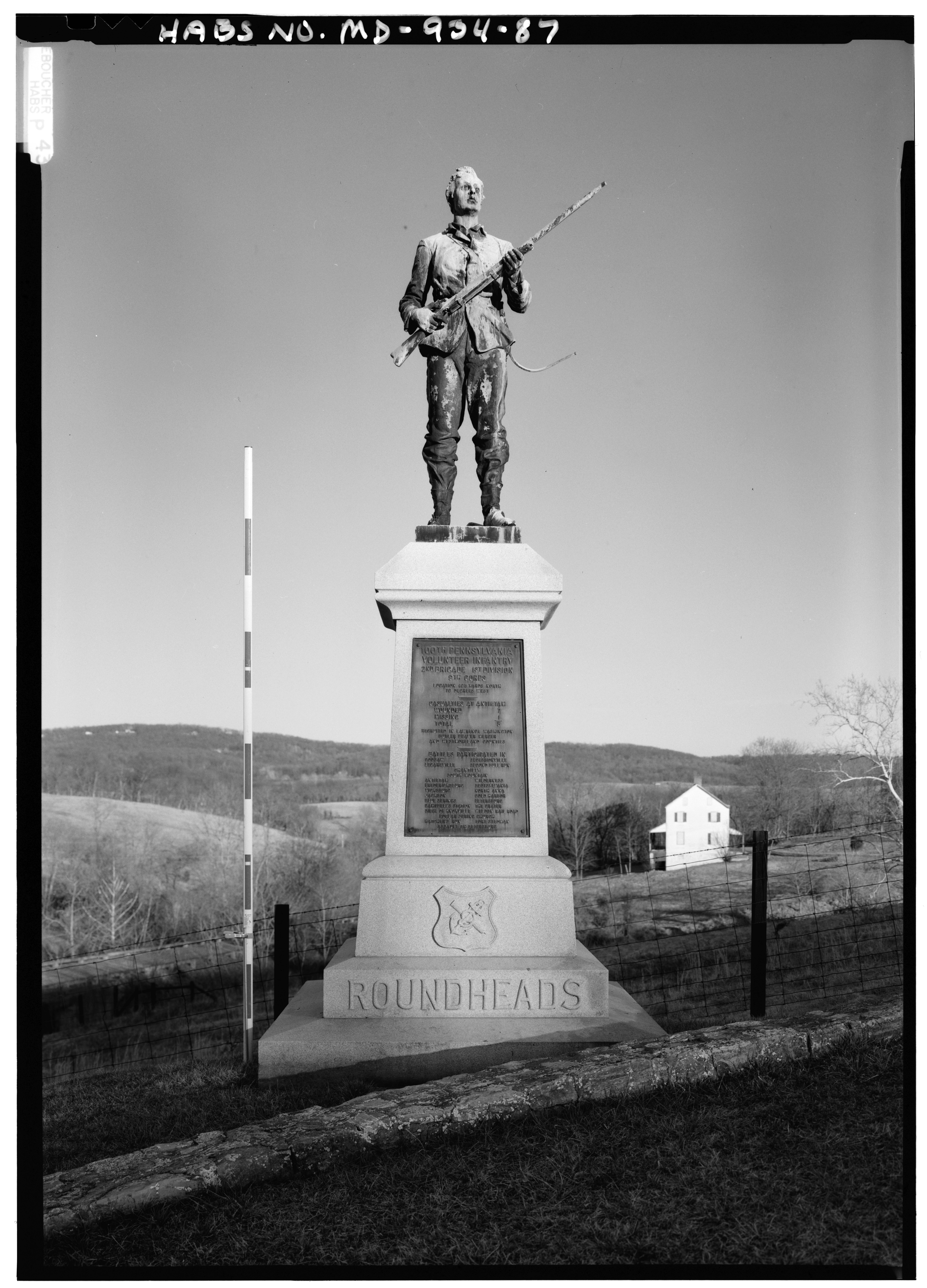
100th Pennsylvania Infantry Monument (1904), Antietam Battlefield, Maryland

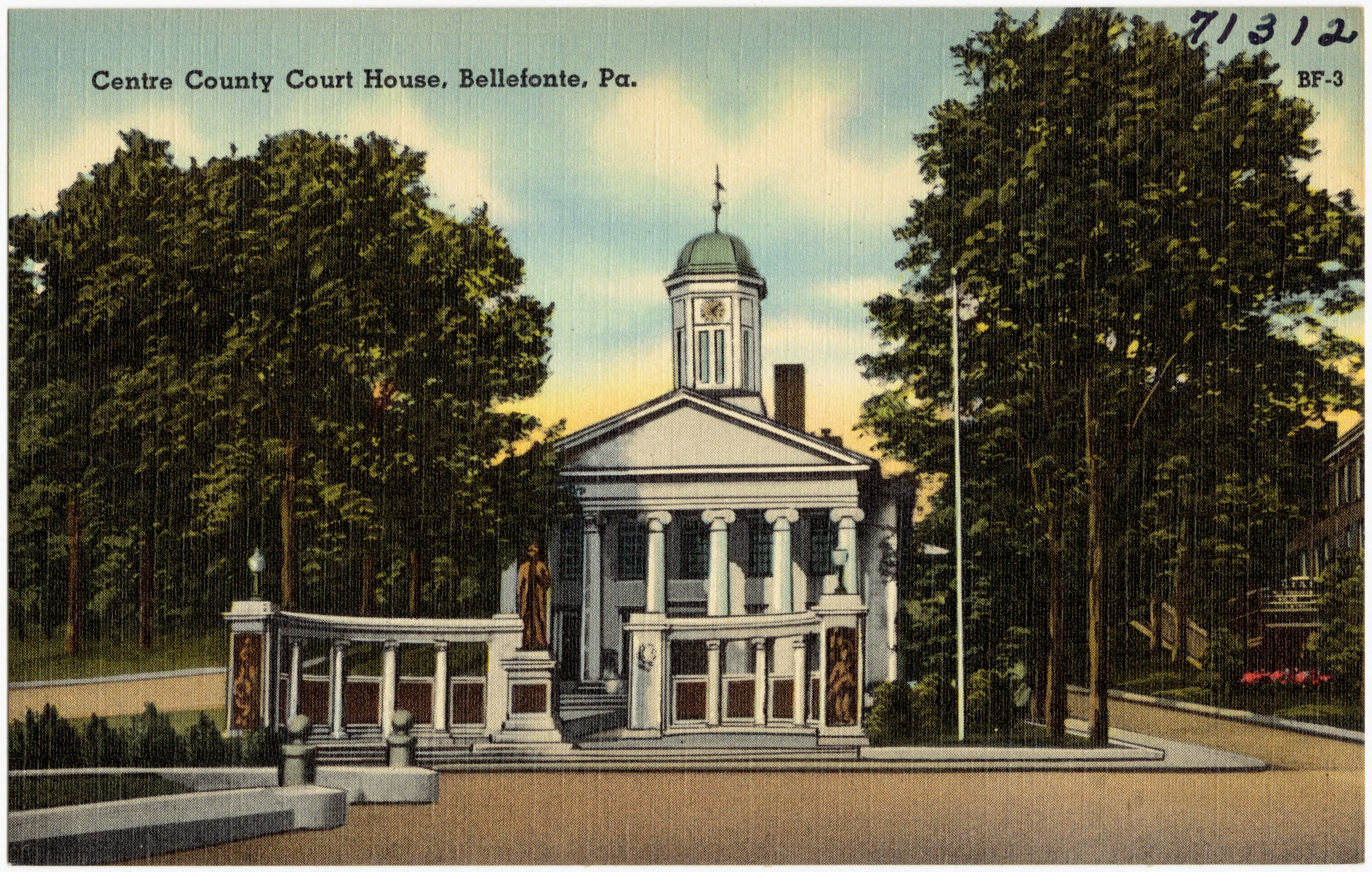
Civil War Memorial (1906), Bellefonte, Pennsylvania

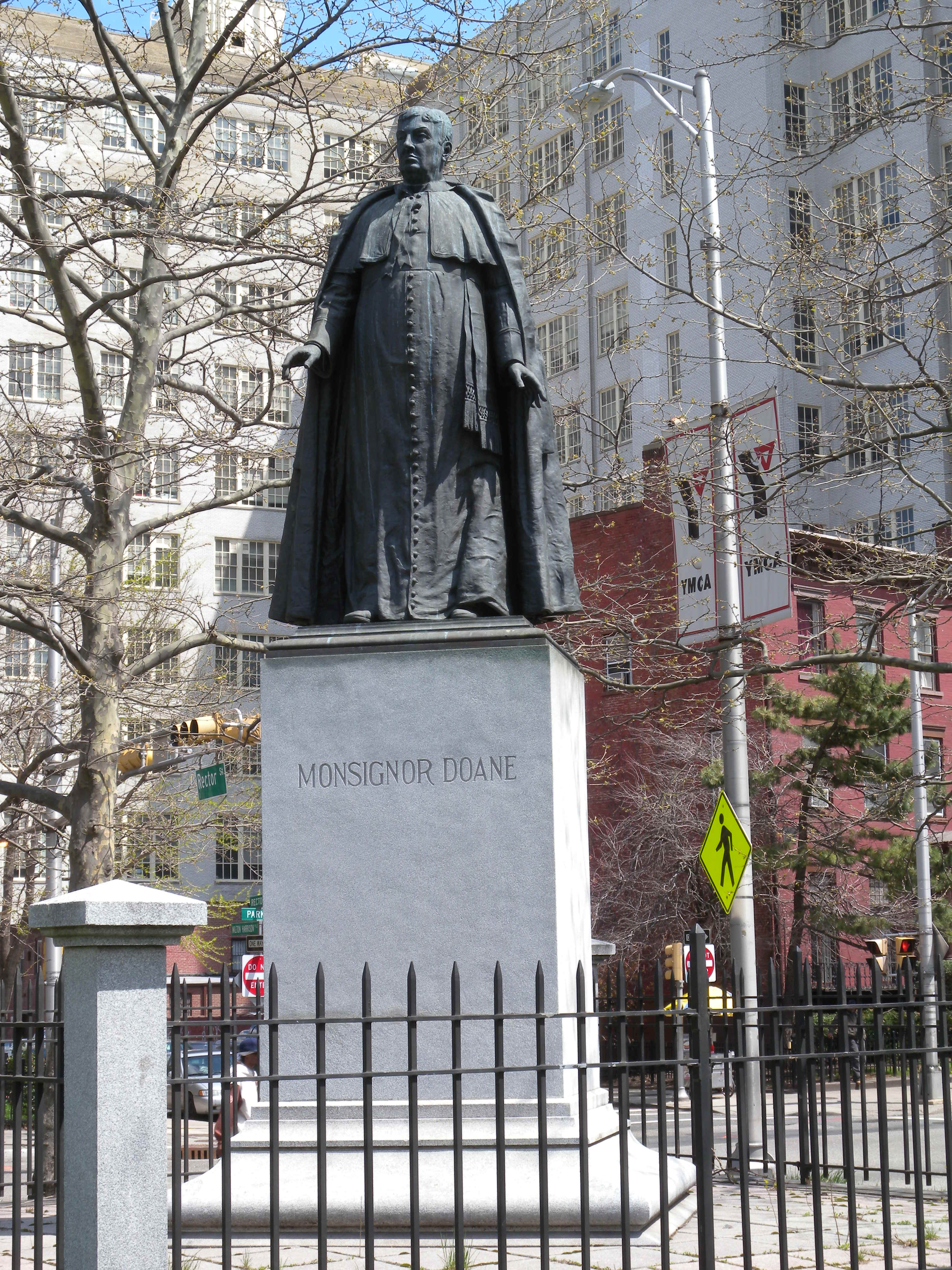
Monsignor Doane (1908), Newark, New Jersey

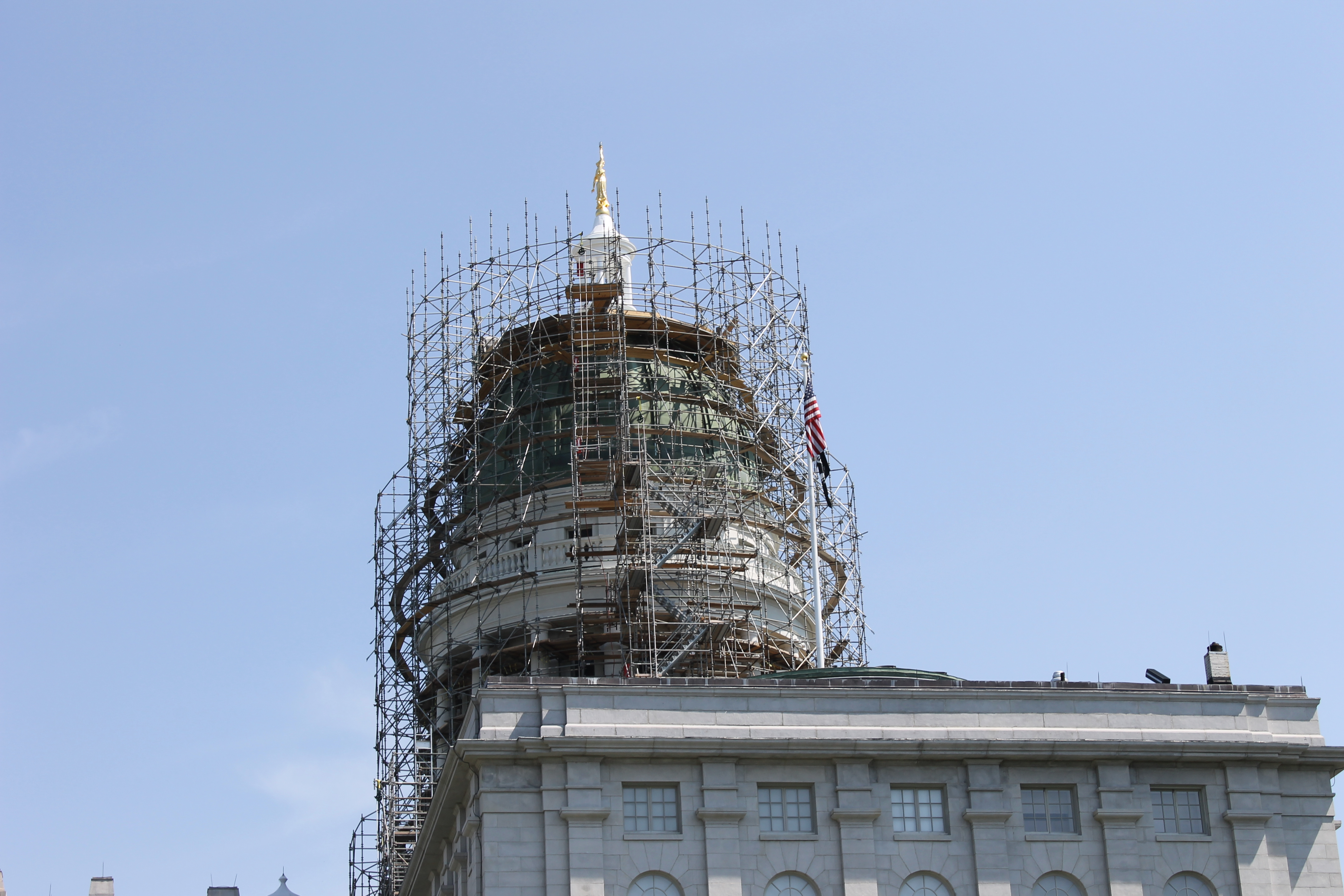
Minerva (1909), Maine State House, Augusta

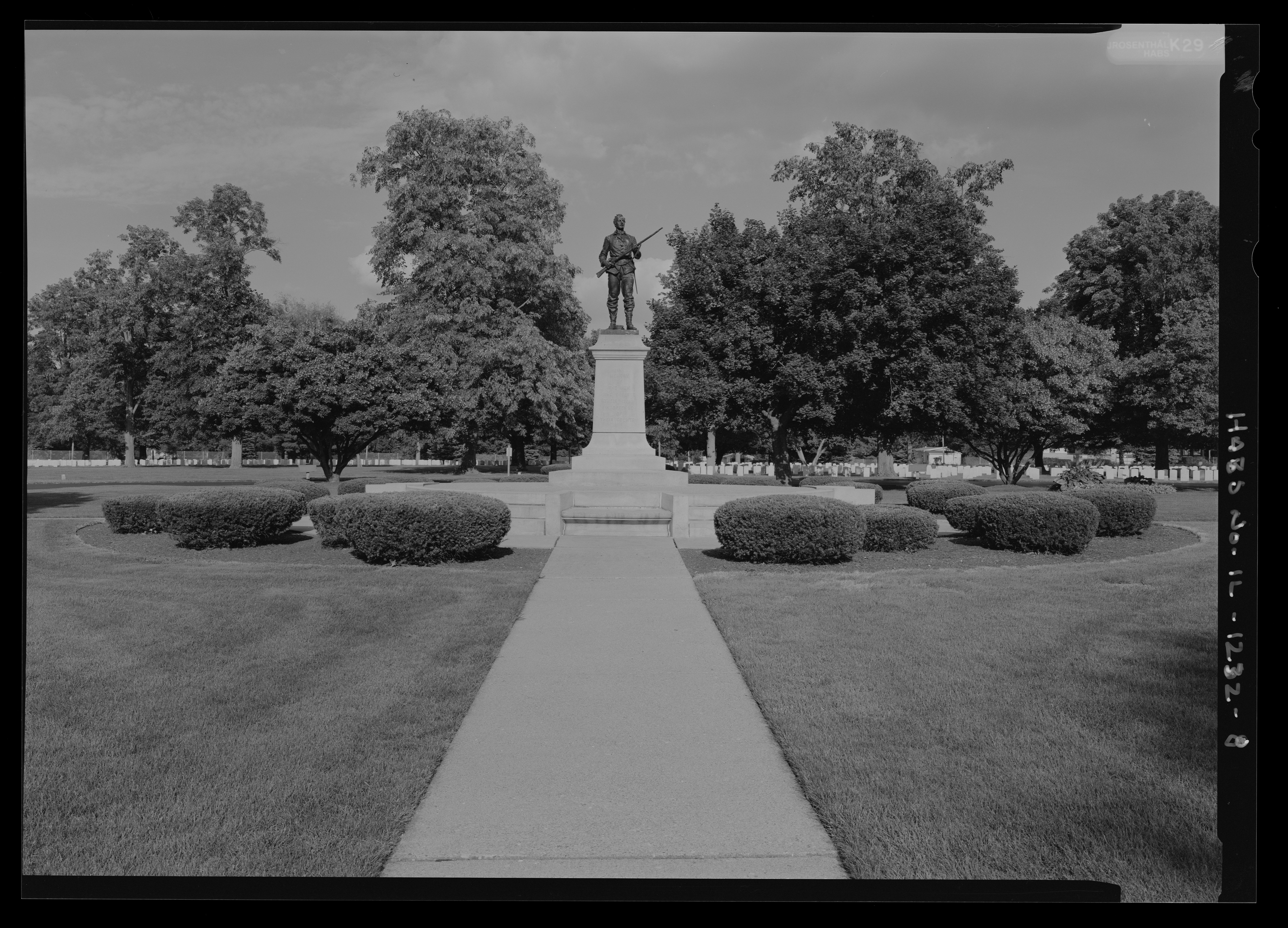
Civil War Monument (1917), Danville, Illinois

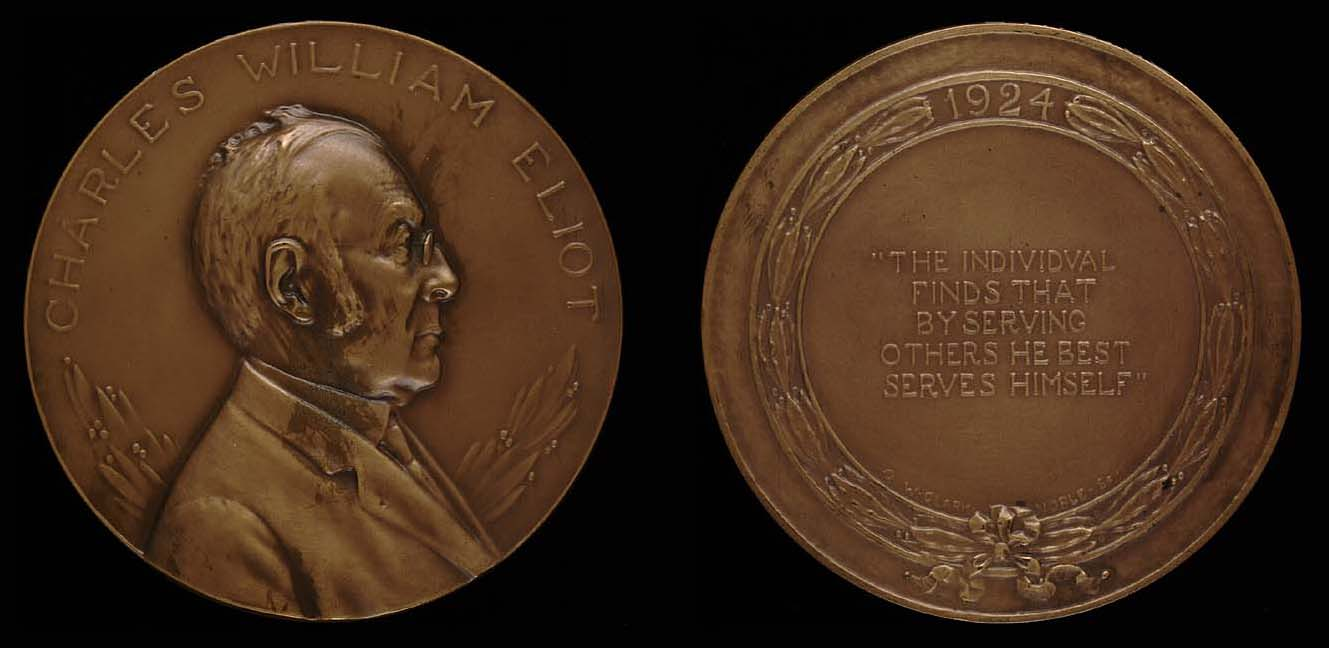
Charles William Eliot medallion (1924)
