= Gardiner Historic District (Gardiner, Maine) =

Historic district in Maine, United States

- U.S. National Register of Historic Places
- U.S. Historic district
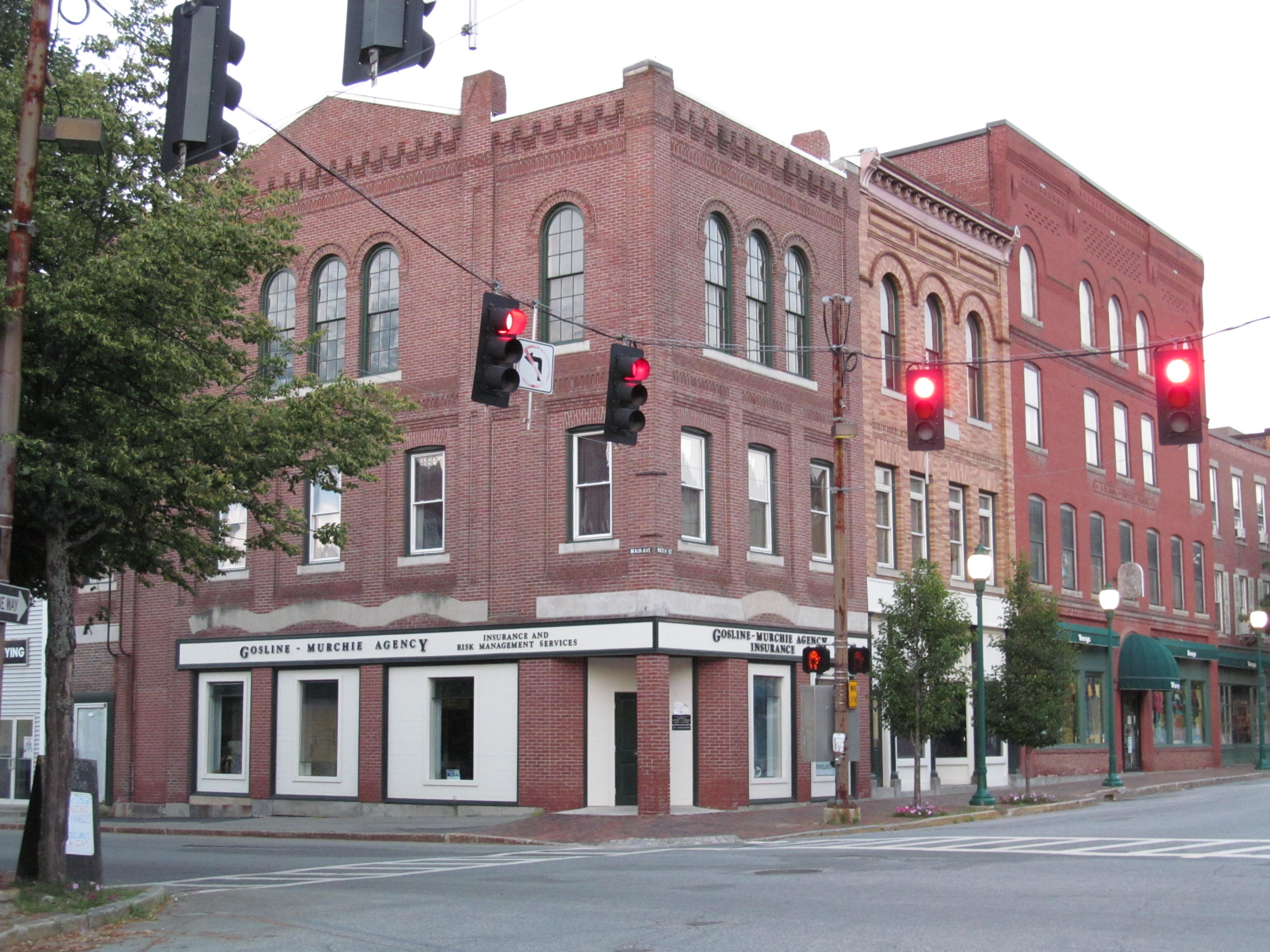

- Location within Maine Location within the United States
- Location: Water St., Gardiner, Maine
- Coordinates: 44°13′45″N 69°46′15″W
- Area: 7 acres (2.8 ha)
- Architect: Multiple
- Architectural style: Greek Revival, Late Victorian
- NRHP reference No.: 80000233
- Added to NRHP: May 6, 1980

The Gardiner Historic District encompasses the historic 19th-century commercial heart of the city of Gardiner, Maine. Once a leading port and industrial center on the Kennebec River, Gardiner's Water Street downtown area retains the feel of its late 19th-century commercial success. It was listed on the National Register of Historic Places in 1980.

== Description and history ==
The town of Gardiner was settled in the late 1750s by Dr. Sylvester Gardiner, whose land grant included the entire present city. The city grew around the mouth of Pleasant Pond (Cobbossee Stream) where it empties into the Kennebec, with industries powered by a series of waterfalls on the stream, and facilitated by the ease of transport on the river. By 1850 the city was one of the leading ports on the river, with eight dams on the stream powering a variety of manufacturing and milling operations. Both the level of industry and water-based transport declined in the 20th century, leaving the largely late 19th-century downtown nearly intact.

The historic district encompassing Gardiner's downtown extends along both sides of Water Street, which runs on the south side of Cobbossee Stream in a roughly northwest-southeast orientation, and then southward along the western river bank. The district begins at Brunswick Avenue, and extends southeast to the Gardiner Public Library building at the eastern end of Mechanic Street. Included in the district are 47 historic buildings, generally of brick construction and two or three stories in height. Most of them are either Greek Revival or Italianate in style, although there are several example of Romanesque Revival and Queen Anne architecture. The public library, designed in 1881 by Henry Richards, is a particularly fine example of the latter style.

== See also ==
- National Register of Historic Places listings in Kennebec County, Maine
