= Howe School =

- U.S. National Register of Historic Places
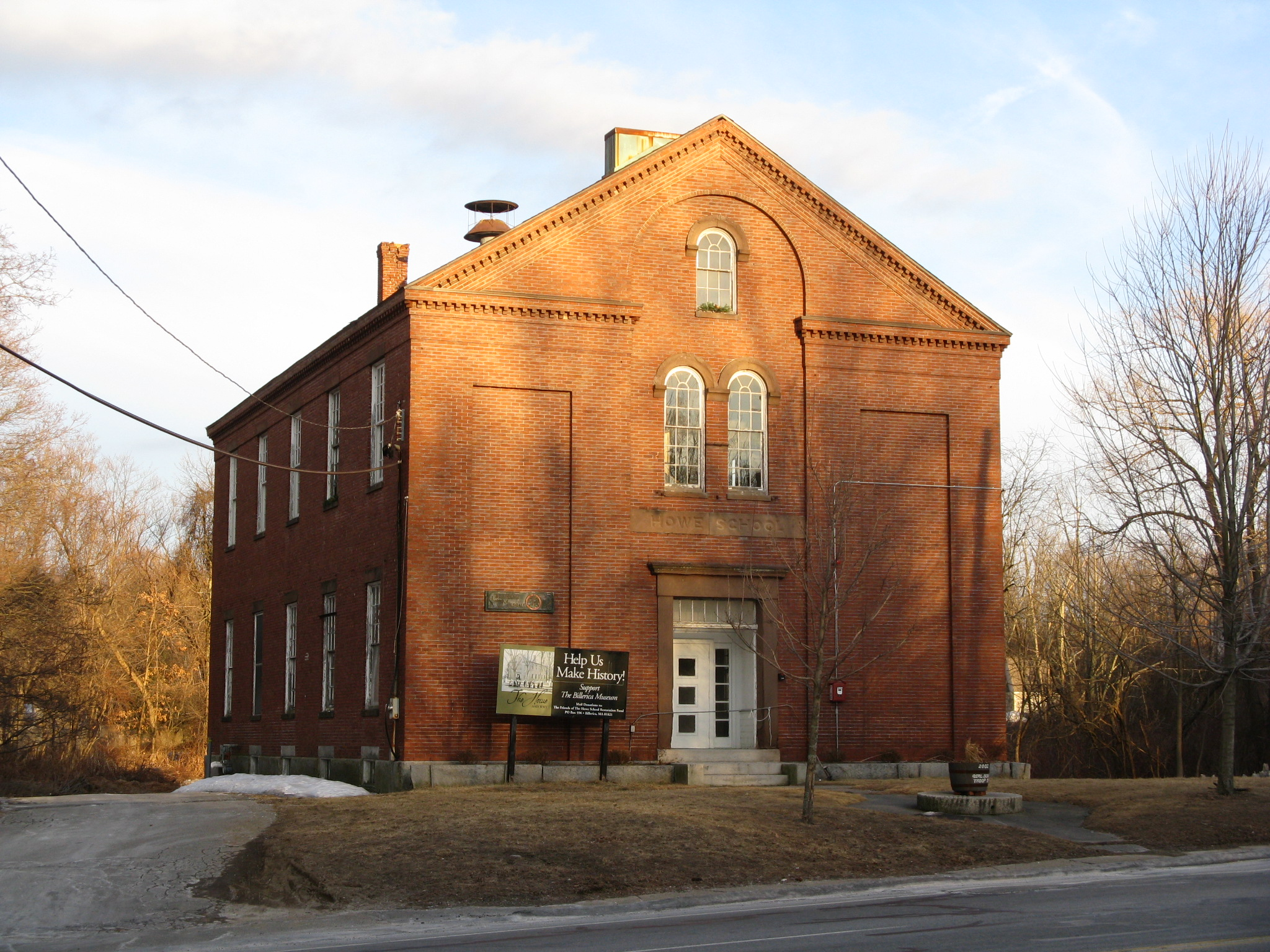
- Howe School

- Location within Massachusetts Location within the United States
- Location: Billerica, Massachusetts
- Coordinates: 42°33′44″N 71°16′11″W
- Built: 1852
- Architect: Bean, Daniel G.
- Architectural style: Greek Revival, Italianate
- NRHP reference No.: 02000634
- Added to NRHP: June 11, 2002

The Howe School is a historic school building at 390 Boston Road in Billerica, Massachusetts. This three story brick building was built in 1852 with funding from a bequest by Zadok Howe, and served the town as a secondary educational institution for 100 years. Designed by Daniel G. Bean of Lowell, the building including an innovative ventilation system for bringing warm and fresh air into the classrooms. At first a private academy, it was designated the town's high school in 1896, and later served as a grade school and as school administration offices.

The building was listed on the National Register of Historic Places in 2002. The Billerica Historical Society planned to operate it as a museum in the late 2000s, but the building remained vacant in 2017, when repairs were made to its roof. Following a two-year renovation that cost nearly $9 million, the Howe School building reopened on November 19, 2022, housing Billerica Access Television (the town's public-access television station) as well as space for community events and meetings.

== Notable faculty ==
- Vivian Blanche Small (1875-1946), president, Lake Erie College

== See also ==
- National Register of Historic Places listings in Middlesex County, Massachusetts
