= Danville National Cemetery (Illinois) =

Coordinates: 40°07′38″N 87°34′51″W

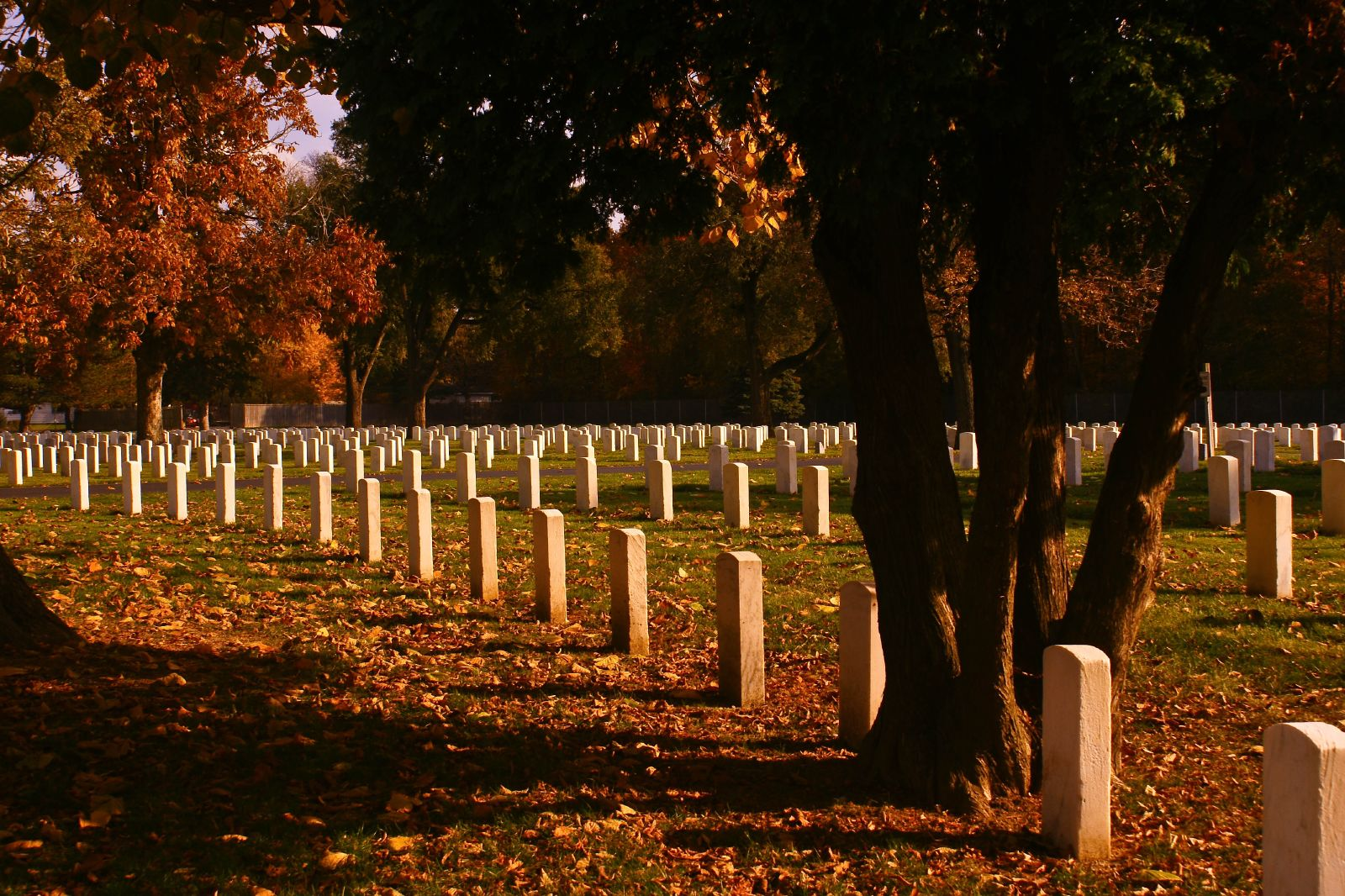
- Danville National Cemetery.
- Interactive map of Danville National Cemetery

Details
- Established: 1898
- Location: Danville, Illinois
- Country: United States
- Type: Military Veterans'
- Size: 63.3 acres (25.6 ha)
- No. of graves: 12,000
- Website: Official
- Find a Grave: Danville National Cemetery

Danville National Cemetery is a United States National Cemetery located in the city of Danville, in Vermilion County, Illinois. Administered by the United States Department of Veterans Affairs, it encompasses 63.3 acres (25.6 ha), and as of 2014, it had 12,000 interments.

== History ==
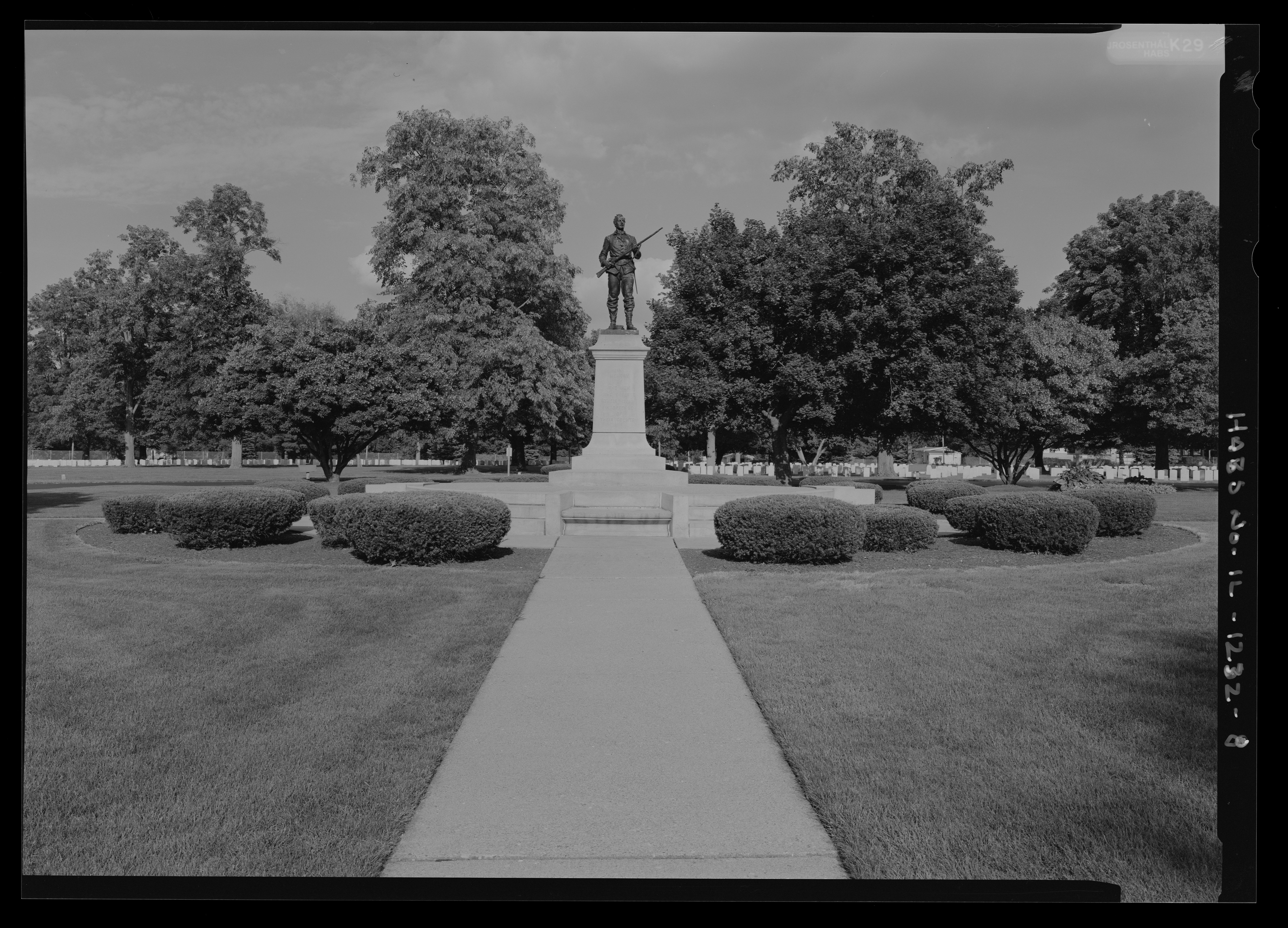
The Soldiers Monument.

In 1897, Congress established a soldiers home called the National Home for Disabled Volunteer Soldiers in Danville, and the next year the cemetery was established on a small plot of land nearby to inter those veterans who died while under care in the facility. In 1901 a new cemetery was plotted, and the interments were all moved to their current location. It was transferred to the National Cemetery system in 1973.

Danville National Cemetery was listed on the National Register of Historic Places in 1992.

== Notable monuments ==
- The Soldiers Monument, by William Clark Noble, a granite base with a bronze statue of a Civil War soldier holding a musket, dedicated in 1917.

== Notable interments ==
- Lieutenant Morton A. Read, Medal of Honor recipient for action at the Battle of Appomattox Courthouse during the Civil War.
