= Gardiner, Maine =

City in Maine, United States

- City
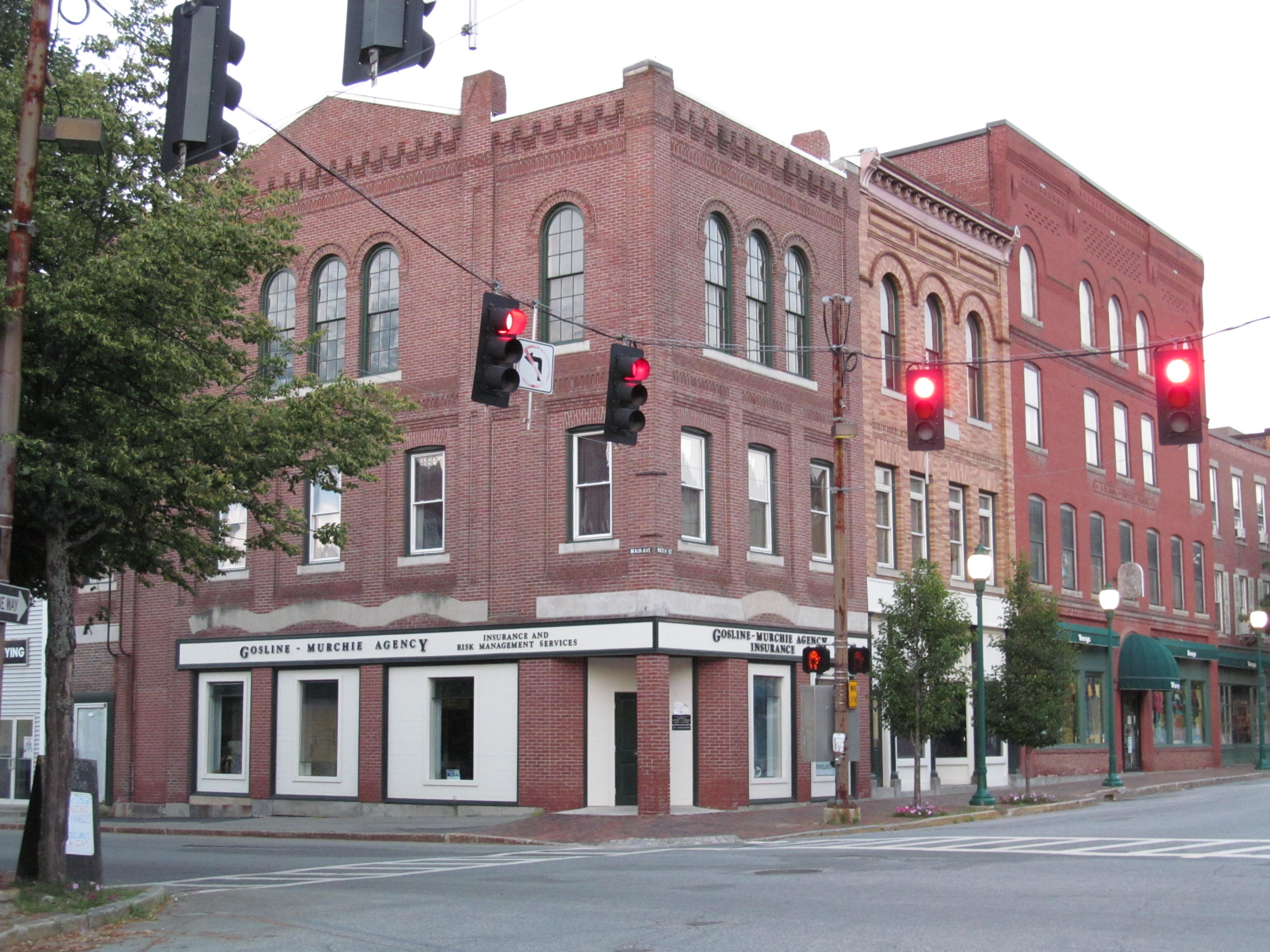
- Historic downtown area

- Seal
- Motto: Moving Forward
- Location in Kennebec County and the state of Maine.
- Coordinates: 44°11′28″N 69°47′32″W
- Country: United States
- State: Maine
- County: Kennebec
- Incorporated: February 17, 1803
- Villages: Libby Hill; South Gardiner

Government
  - Type: Mayor and council-manager

Area
  - Total: 16.57 sq mi (42.91 km^{2})
  - Land: 15.68 sq mi (40.61 km^{2})
  - Water: 0.89 sq mi (2.30 km^{2})
- Elevation: 213 ft (65 m)

Population (2020)
  - Total: 5,961
  - Density: 380.1/sq mi (146.77/km^{2})
- Time zone: UTC−5 (Eastern (EST))
  - Summer (DST): UTC−4 (EDT)
- ZIP Codes: 04345 (Gardiner); 04359 (South Gardiner)
- Area code: 207
- FIPS code: 23-27085
- GNIS feature ID: 582486
- Website: www.gardinermaine.gov

Gardiner is a city in Kennebec County, Maine, United States. The population was 5,961 at the 2020 census. Gardiner is a nationally accredited Main Street America community. It is included in the Augusta, Maine micropolitan New England City and Town Area.

== History ==
Located at the head of navigation on the Kennebec River, Gardiner was founded as Gardinerstown Plantation in 1754 by Dr. Silvester Gardiner, a prominent Boston physician. Dr. Gardiner had made a fortune as a drug merchant, with one apothecary shop in Massachusetts and two in Connecticut, and became a principal proprietor of the Kennebec Purchase within the old Plymouth Patent. He proved a tireless promoter for his development, which once comprised over 100,000 acres (400 km^{2}).

Dr. Gardiner induced a gristmill builder, saw millwright, house carpenter and wheelwright to settle here, as well as a man he enslaved named Isaac "Hazard" Stockbridge. Houses, mills, a church and a blockhouse were built. Situated at the confluence of the Kennebec River and Cobbosseecontee Stream, which has falls that drop 130 feet, the location was recognized by him as ideal for water-powered mills. Gardinerstown, set off from Pittston in 1760, became center of the regional economy.

The city became known for exporting ice. Each winter men cut large blocks from the Kennebec River, then covered the ice with sawdust in warehouses to keep it frozen into summer. It was loaded year-round on large vessels for shipment throughout the United States and world. Gardiner was noted for its pristine Kennebec ice, harvested at the furthest point upriver that deep-draft vessels could reach.

In 1851, the city was connected by railroad. One of the first workable steam automobiles in America was built in Gardiner in 1858. Beginning in the 1860s, paper mills flourished, as did the commercial ice industry between the 1880s and 1920s. By the 1960s, however, many mills declined and closed, sending Gardiner's economy plummeting. The former mill town is now largely a bedroom community for people who work in Augusta, the state's capital, as well as Bath Iron Works in Bath. Some residents commute as far as the Portland area. The city is endowed with a great deal of antique architecture, much of it beautifully restored. In 1980, the entire downtown historic district became one of the National Register of Historic Places listings in Kennebec County, Maine.

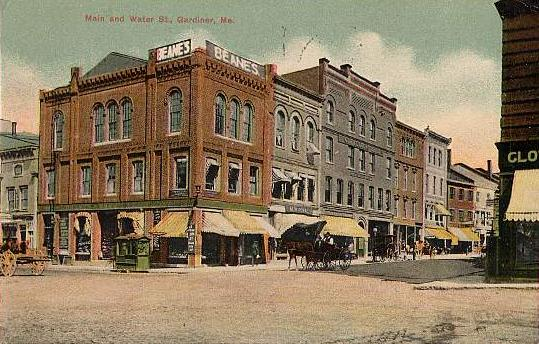
Downtown c. 1905

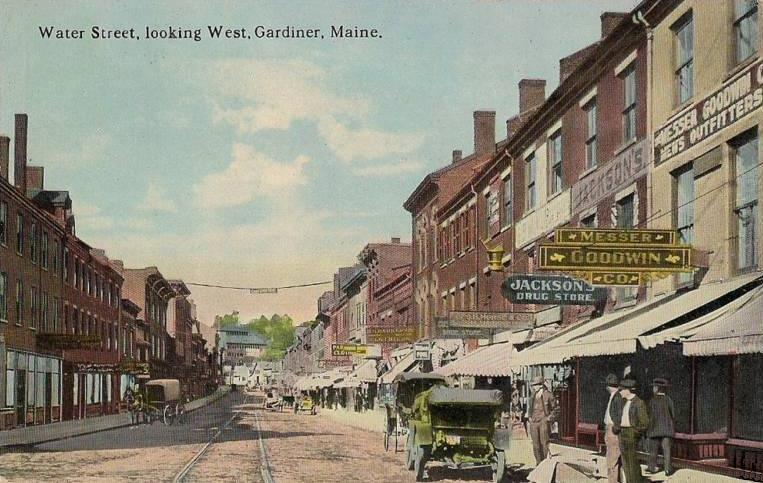
Water Street in 1914

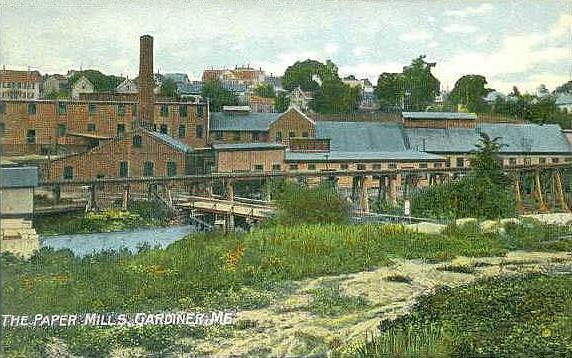
Paper mills in 1909

== Geography ==
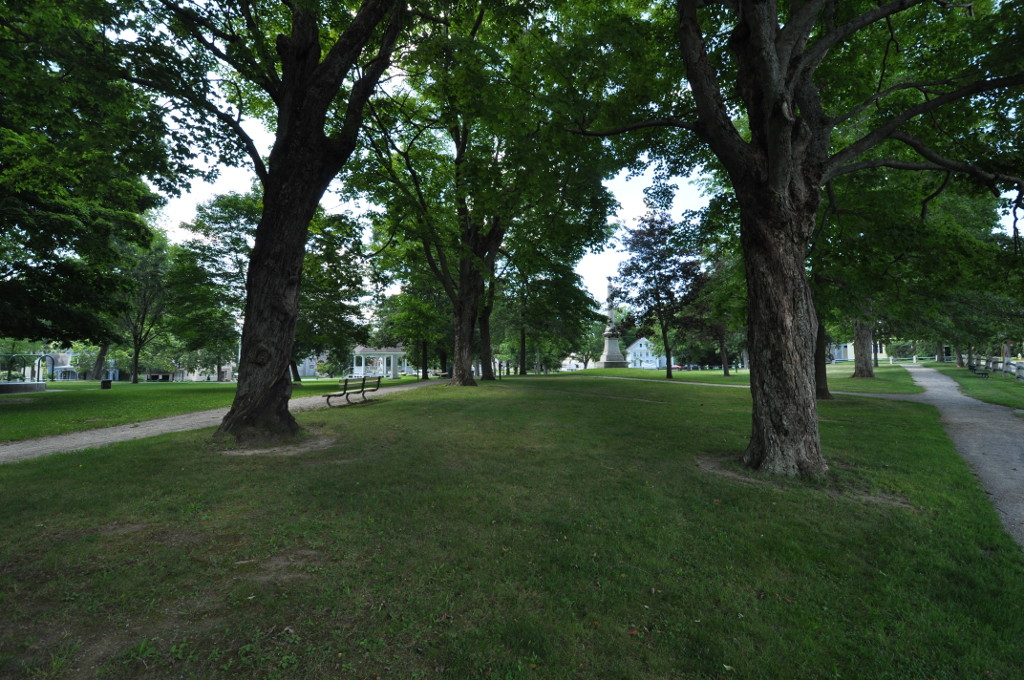
Town common of Gardiner

Gardiner is located south of Augusta on the west side of the Kennebec River at the confluence of the Cobbesseeconte Stream. Randolph lies just across the river.

According to the United States Census Bureau, the city has a total area of 16.57 square miles (42.92 km^{2}), of which 15.65 square miles (40.53 km^{2}) is land and 0.92 square miles (2.38 km^{2}) is water.

=== Climate ===
This climatic region is typified by large seasonal temperature differences, with warm to hot (and often humid) summers and cold (sometimes severely cold) winters. According to the Köppen Climate Classification system, Gardiner has a humid continental climate, abbreviated "Dfb" on climate maps.

Climate data for Gardiner, Maine (1991–2020)
Month	Jan	Feb	Mar	Apr	May	Jun	Jul	Aug	Sep	Oct	Nov	Dec	Year
Mean daily maximum °F (°C)	30.2 (−1.0)	33.3 (0.7)	41.5 (5.3)	54.2 (12.3)	66.3 (19.1)	75.0 (23.9)	80.6 (27.0)	79.9 (26.6)	72.4 (22.4)	59.7 (15.4)	47.3 (8.5)	36.4 (2.4)	56.4 (13.6)
Daily mean °F (°C)	19.8 (−6.8)	21.7 (−5.7)	31.2 (−0.4)	43.5 (6.4)	55.1 (12.8)	64.2 (17.9)	70.0 (21.1)	68.9 (20.5)	61.1 (16.2)	49.2 (9.6)	38.2 (3.4)	27.2 (−2.7)	45.8 (7.7)
Mean daily minimum °F (°C)	9.4 (−12.6)	10.2 (−12.1)	20.8 (−6.2)	32.7 (0.4)	43.8 (6.6)	53.5 (11.9)	59.5 (15.3)	58.0 (14.4)	49.7 (9.8)	38.6 (3.7)	29.0 (−1.7)	17.9 (−7.8)	35.3 (1.8)
Average precipitation inches (mm)	3.58 (91)	2.95 (75)	3.71 (94)	4.18 (106)	3.66 (93)	4.40 (112)	3.42 (87)	3.61 (92)	3.93 (100)	5.39 (137)	4.52 (115)	4.38 (111)	47.73 (1,213)
Average snowfall inches (cm)	17.6 (45)	20.0 (51)	12.7 (32)	2.8 (7.1)	0.0 (0.0)	0.0 (0.0)	0.0 (0.0)	0.0 (0.0)	0.0 (0.0)	0.2 (0.51)	2.3 (5.8)	13.3 (34)	68.9 (175.41)
Source: NOAA

== Demographics ==
Historical population
Census	Pop.	Note	%±
1810	1,029		—
1820	2,053		99.5%
1830	3,709		80.7%
1840	5,042		35.9%
1850	6,486		28.6%
1860	4,487		−30.8%
1870	4,497		0.2%
1880	4,439		−1.3%
1890	5,491		23.7%
1900	5,501		0.2%
1910	5,311		−3.5%
1920	5,475		3.1%
1930	5,609		2.4%
1940	6,044		7.8%
1950	6,649		10.0%
1960	6,897		3.7%
1970	6,685		−3.1%
1980	6,485		−3.0%
1990	6,746		4.0%
2000	6,198		−8.1%
2010	5,800		−6.4%
2020	5,961		2.8%
U.S. Decennial Census

=== 2020 census ===
As of the 2020 census, Gardiner had a population of 5,961. The median age was 41.3 years. 20.9% of residents were under the age of 18 and 19.2% of residents were 65 years of age or older. For every 100 females there were 92.6 males, and for every 100 females age 18 and over there were 91.6 males age 18 and over.

65.0% of residents lived in urban areas, while 35.0% lived in rural areas.

There were 2,529 households in Gardiner, of which 27.2% had children under the age of 18 living in them. Of all households, 42.5% were married-couple households, 18.5% were households with a male householder and no spouse or partner present, and 27.5% were households with a female householder and no spouse or partner present. About 31.8% of all households were made up of individuals and 12.4% had someone living alone who was 65 years of age or older.

There were 2,810 housing units, of which 10.0% were vacant. The homeowner vacancy rate was 1.9% and the rental vacancy rate was 7.5%.

Racial composition as of the 2020 census
Race	Number	Percent
White	5,443	91.3%
Black or African American	45	0.8%
American Indian and Alaska Native	14	0.2%
Asian	29	0.5%
Native Hawaiian and Other Pacific Islander	1	0.0%
Some other race	47	0.8%
Two or more races	382	6.4%
Hispanic or Latino (of any race)	118	2.0%

=== 2010 census ===
As of the census of 2010, there were 5,800 people, 2,487 households, and 1,550 families living in the city. The population density was 370.6 inhabitants per square mile (143.1/km^{2}). There were 2,778 housing units at an average density of 177.5 per square mile (68.5/km^{2}). The racial makeup of the city was 95.4% White, 0.3% African American, 0.7% Native American, 0.7% Asian, 0.4% from other races, and 2.5% from two or more races. Hispanic or Latino of any race were 1.0% of the population.

There were 2,487 households, of which 28.9% had children under the age of 18 living with them, 44.8% were married couples living together, 11.8% had a female householder with no husband present, 5.7% had a male householder with no wife present, and 37.7% were non-families. 29.6% of all households were made up of individuals, and 9.7% had someone living alone who was 65 years of age or older. The average household size was 2.30 and the average family size was 2.82.

The median age in the city was 40.9 years. 21.7% of residents were under the age of 18; 7.4% were between the ages of 18 and 24; 26.3% were from 25 to 44; 30.1% were from 45 to 64; and 14.4% were 65 years of age or older. The gender makeup of the city was 48.8% male and 51.2% female.

=== 2000 census ===
As of the census of 2000, there were 6,198 people, 2,510 households, and 1,603 families living in the city. The population density was 395.6 inhabitants per square mile (152.7/km^{2}). There were 2,702 housing units at an average density of 172.5 per square mile (66.6/km^{2}). The racial makeup of the city was 99.90% White, 0.39% African American, 0.66% Native American, 0.35% Asian, 0.05% Pacific Islander, 0.24% from other races, and 1.40% from two or more races. Hispanic or Latino of any race were 0.81% of the population.

There were 2,510 households, out of which 32.5% had children under the age of 18 living with them, 49.1% were married couples living together, 10.6% had a female householder with no husband present, and 36.1% were non-families. 29.4% of all households were made up of individuals, and 10.9% had someone living alone who was 65 years of age or older. The average household size was 2.41 and the average family size was 2.97.

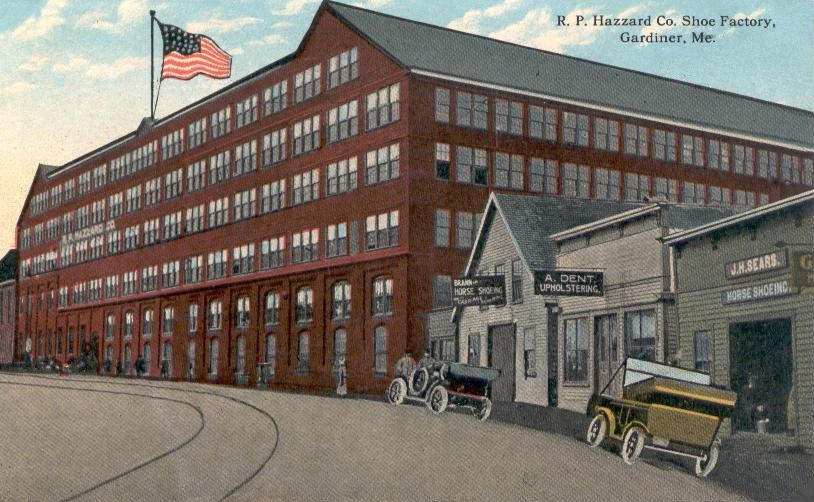
R. P. Hazzard Co. Shoe Factory in 1915

In the city, the population was spread out, with 24.8% under the age of 18, 7.7% from 18 to 24, 29.7% from 25 to 44, 24.2% from 45 to 64, and 13.6% who were 65 years of age or older. The median age was 38 years. For every 100 females, there were 93.0 males. For every 100 females age 18 and over, there were 87.7 males.

The median income for a household in the city was $35,103, and the median income for a family was $42,750. Males had a median income of $33,069 versus $25,399 for females. The per capita income for the city was $18,033. About 11.4% of families and 13.5% of the population were below the poverty line, including 17.2% of those under age 18 and 14.9% of those age 65 or over.

== Education ==
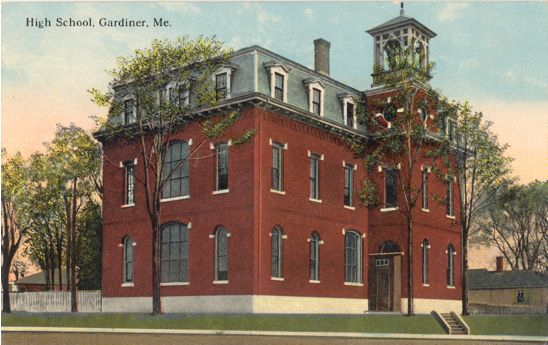
Old High School (1870–1969), designed by Francis H. Fassett

Gardiner is part of Maine School Administrative District #11, which serves the communities of Gardiner, Pittston, Randolph and West Gardiner. The district operates five elementary schools, a middle school, and high school. The following schools are located in Gardiner:

- Gardiner Area High School (9–12) 620 students
- Gardiner Regional Middle School (6–8) 421 students
- Laura E. Richards School (Pre-K–2) 233 students
- River View Community School (3–5) 174 students

== Government ==
=== Local government ===
Gardiner has a Mayor and council-manager system, with all governmental powers resting in a legislative body called a City Council. Voters elect a mayor, and seven council members, one for each of Gardiner's four districts and three at-large. The council appoints a city manager to handle the ordinary business of the city.

=== Political makeup ===
In the 2012 Presidential election, Barack Obama received 1,699 of the town's votes to Mitt Romney's 1,158. Political affiliation is roughly split into thirds between Democrats, Republicans, and Independents.

Voter registration

Voter Registration and Party Enrollment as of November 2012
Party	Total Voters	Percentage
Unenrolled	1,528	34.57%
Democratic	1,487	33.65%
Republican	1,164	26.34%
Green Independent	240	5.43%
Total	4,419	100%

== Notable people ==
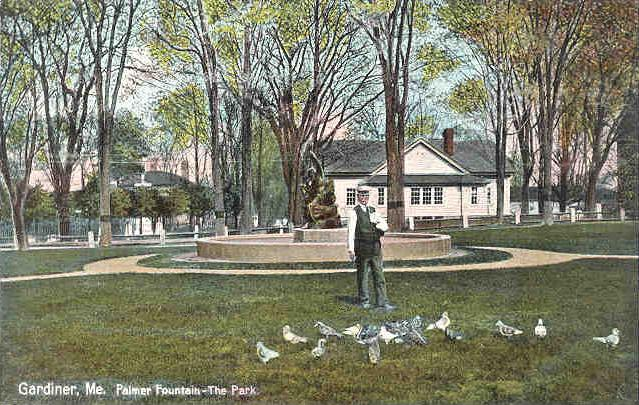
The Park and Palmer Fountain in 1909. Melted down for the war effort, the bronze statue was later replaced.

- Louis J. Brann, 56th Governor of Maine
- George Burgess, the first Episcopal bishop of Maine
- Henry Chadwick, journalist
- Charles R. Clason, U.S. Congressman
- Patrick Colwell, Speaker of the Maine House of Representatives
- Burton M. Cross, Maine's 61st and 63rd Governor
- Henry Dearborn, physician, and a veteran of both the Revolutionary War and the War of 1812
- William Diamond, Maine State Senator
- Charles Dow, Maine legislator and businessman
- George Evans, U.S. Congressman and Senator
- Barzillai Gannett, U.S. Congressman
- Silvester Gardiner, physician and founder
- Robert Hallowell Gardiner, grandson of Silvester Gardiner and Gardiner's first mayor
- John W. Heselton, U.S. Congressman
- Horace A. Hildreth, ambassador and the 59th Governor of Maine
- Henrietta Hooker, botanist and educator
- Julia Ward Howe, social activist and poet
- Edward Hunter, army officer
- George Kenney, World War II general
- John Hiram Lathrop, educator
- Earle McCormick, Maine State Senator
- Karen Montell, State legislator
- Alton Morgan, Maine state legislator
- William Clark Noble, sculptor
- James Parker, U.S. Congressman
- George H. Ray, Speaker of the Wisconsin State Assembly
- Chester I. Reed, attorney/politician
- Laura E. Richards, author and poet
- Robert Hallowell Richards, mining engineer and metallurgist
- Edwin Arlington Robinson, poet
- Arthur Sager, track and field athlete
- George Plaisted Sanderson, Civil War veteran
- Katie Schide, professional ultramarathoner
- Isaac D. Seyburn, Civil War merchant captain
- Vivian Blanche Small (1875–1946), president, Lake Erie College
- Albert Spear, President of the Maine Senate
- Frank Parker Stockbridge (1870–1940), author and journalist
- John R. Swanton, anthropologist
- Wesley Webber, painter
- Dorothy Clarke Wilson, author
- William E. Wing, silent-film screenwriter
- Henry Aiken Worcester, 19th century minister
