= Silvester Gardiner =

American physician (1708–1786)

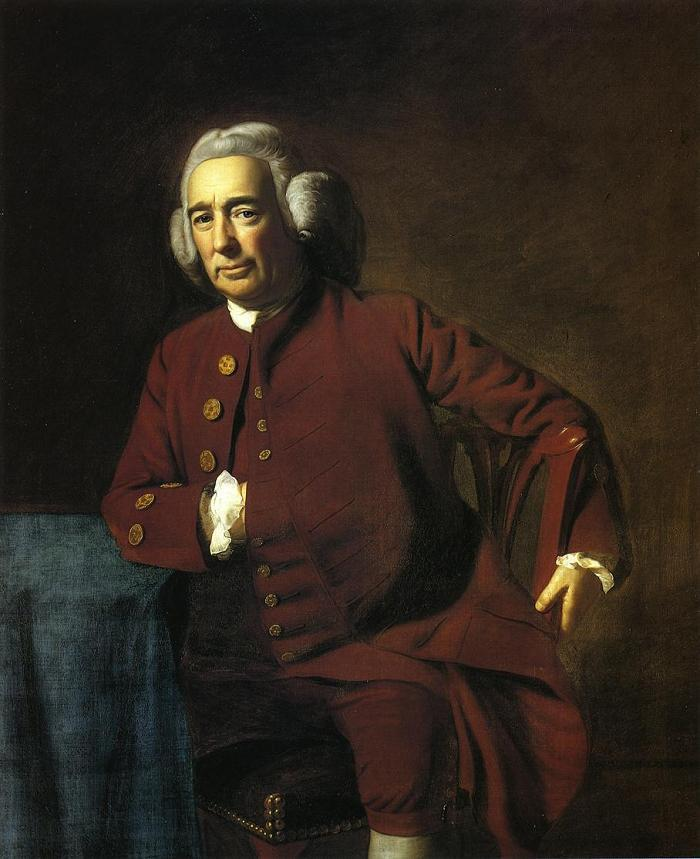
- Dr. Silvester Gardiner, c. 1772, by John Singleton Copley
- Born: June 29, 1708; South Kingstown, Colony of Rhode Island and Providence Plantations
- Died: August 8, 1786 (aged 78); Newport, Rhode Island,
- Occupations: Physician, drug merchant and land developer
- Known for: founding Gardiner, Maine
- Spouses: Anne Gibbons; Abigail Eppes (nee Pickman); Catherine Goldthwaite

Dr. Silvester Gardiner (June 29, 1708 – August 8, 1786) was a physician, pharmaceutical merchant and land developer of Maine. He is known for founding the city of Gardiner.

== Early years ==
He was born in South Kingstown, Rhode Island, the son of William Gardiner and Abigail Remington. After studying medicine in New York, London and Paris, Dr. Gardiner opened a practice in Boston, where he became a lecturer on anatomy. He actively promoted inoculation for small pox, for which he proposed and established a hospital in 1761. But he made his fortune importing drugs for distribution and sale. He contributed generously to the construction of Boston's King's Chapel, where he was a warden, and also to the compilation and publication of a prayer book. But he is most remembered for his purchase and development of over 100,000 acres (400 km^{2}) of wilderness on the Kennebec River in Maine, where he founded what is today the city of Gardiner.

== Maine settlement ==
A proprietor of the old Plymouth Patent, his efforts to settle the territory were unceasing between 1753 and the American Revolution. He selected the location of Gardinerstown Plantation, established in 1754 at the head of navigation on the Kennebec River, at its confluence with the Cobbosseecontee Stream, which had falls to provide water power for industry. A millwright, carpenter and other workmen were induced to settle and build his town. He promoted immigration and land cultivation. He contributed a valuable library and built the first Episcopal church in Pittston, from which Gardinerstown would be set off in 1760.

When Gardiner moved from Massachusetts to Maine in 1766, he compelled Isaac "Hazard" Stockbridge, a Black man whom he enslaved, to move with him. Stockbridge brought his free Black wife, Cooper Loring, and their children. Stockbridge used sabotage in attempts to gain freedom from Gardiner, killing one of his horses, setting fire to his home, and attempting to poison his family. Gardiner sent Stockbridge and his family to live on a remote portion of the property, where he lived under little supervision until he died in 1780.

== Political leanings ==
In 1774, Dr. Gardiner added his name to a letter addressed to Massachusetts Royal Governor Thomas Hutchinson, affirming his allegiance to the Loyalist cause. When the British army evacuated Boston in 1776, Dr. Gardiner fled to Halifax, Nova Scotia. With few of his possessions, he then lived in Poole, England throughout the Revolutionary War. In 1778, his name appeared in the Massachusetts Banishment Act, and his vast landholdings were confiscated. Even his personal collection of rare books was sold at auction. Because of an error in the confiscation of the Maine property, however, his heirs would be able to secure its return.

== Death ==
In 1783, Dr. Gardiner spent time in St. John's, Newfoundland, and in 1784 wrote a report enumerating its resources, advocating 11 reasons for settlement. In 1785, he returned to Newport, Rhode Island, where he died the following year and was buried under Trinity Church. The Christ Episcopal Church, built in 1820 beside the Gardiner common, bears his cenotaph.

== Family ==
He married three times, first to Anne Gibbins (or Gibbons) in around 1730, with whom he had all of his children prior to her death in 1771. His second marriage was to Abigail Eppes (née Pickman) sometime before he departed from Boston in 1776; she died on November 3, 1780, after they moved to England. His third wife was Catherine Goldthwaite, who was about 49 years younger than he; they married in February 1785. After Gardiner's death, Catherine married W. Powell of Boston.

Gardiner's first son, John Gardiner (1731-1793), was Attorney General of Saint Christopher Island and father of John Sylvester John Gardiner.
