= Peacock Beach State Park =

State park in Maine, United States

- Location within Maine
- Interactive map of Peacock Beach State Park
- Location: Richmond, Maine, United States
- Coordinates: 44°09′25″N 69°51′33″W
- Elevation: 259 ft (79 m)
- Administrator: Town of Richmond
- Website: Official website
- Maine State Parks

Peacock Beach State Park is a locally managed, public recreation area on Pleasant Pond in Richmond, Maine. The park is on U.S. Route 201 between the Maine Turnpike (I-95) and I-295, about 12 miles (20 km) south of Augusta. The Town of Richmond took over operation of the park in 2010. The park offers facilities for picnicking and swimming.

== History ==
It cost the state around $23,000 a year to operate the park. It was not regularly staffed, and the entrance fee was collected with a box at the gate that visitors were expected to place their fee into. Prior to 2010, it had been estimated that as few as 10 percent of visitors paid the fee.

In 2010, the state decided not to open the park as a cost-saving measure and offered a 25-year lease to the Town of Richmond to operate the park. The town accepted the offer at its June 3, 2010 town meeting. The town does not staff the park, aside from conducting regular maintenance with part-time employees. The collection box for payment of the entry fee has been maintained, but the town has considered staffing the entrance to increase fee collection.
