= Gardiner Place Historic District =

Historic district in New York, United States

- U.S. National Register of Historic Places
- U.S. Historic district
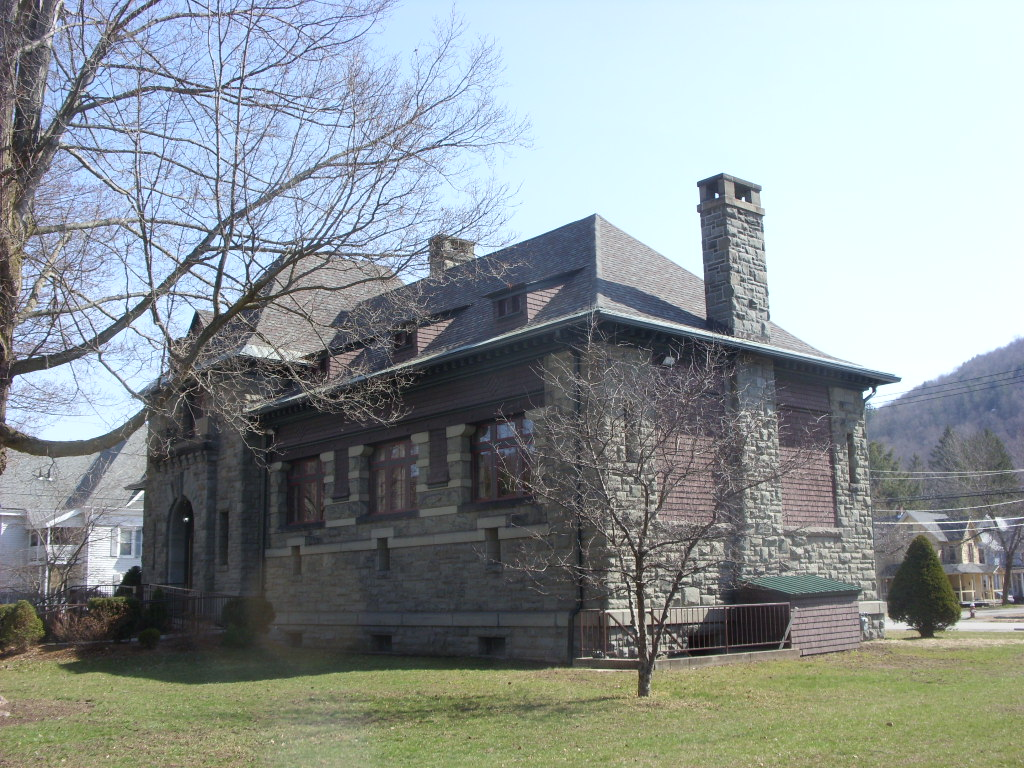
- Ogden Free Library, April 2009

- Location within New York Location within the United States
- Location: Gardiner Place, Walton, New York
- Coordinates: 42°10′8″N 75°7′43″W
- Area: 1.5 acres (0.61 ha)
- Built: 1896
- Architect: Multiple
- Architectural style: Classical Revival, Romanesque
- NRHP reference No.: 84002222
- Added to NRHP: May 24, 1984

Gardiner Place Historic District is a national historic district located at Walton in Delaware County, New York. The district contains three contributing buildings. They are the Village Hall, Ogden Free Library, and the separately listed U.S. Post Office.>

It was listed on the National Register of Historic Places in 1984.

== Gallery ==
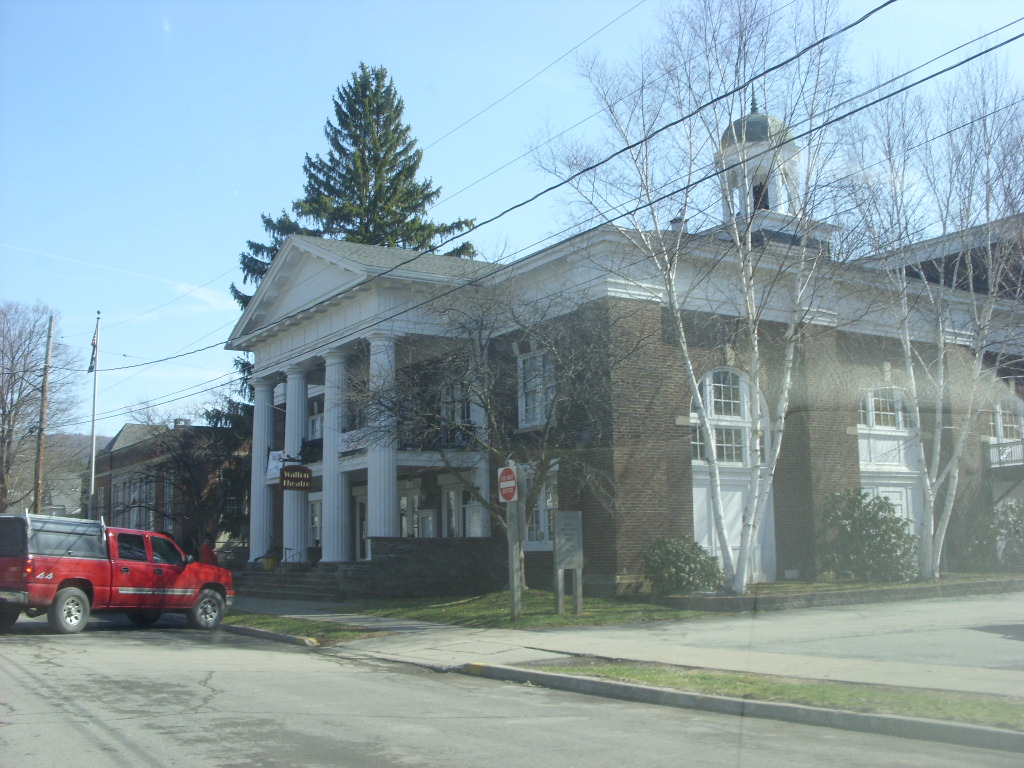
Walton Village Hall, April 2009

== See also ==
- National Register of Historic Places listings in Delaware County, New York
