= Gardiner High School (Maine) =

Coordinates: 44.2276°N 69.7889°W

- 40 West Hill Rd; Gardiner, Maine 04345; United States

Information
- NCES School ID: 231059000329
- Principal: Lauren Arnold
- Grades: 9–12
- Gender: Coed
- Enrollment: 582 (2023–2024)
- Website: www.msad11.org/o/gahs

Gardiner High School, also known as Gardiner Area High School (GAHS), is a public school serving grades 9–12 in Gardiner, Maine in the United States. Tigers are the school mascot. In 2016, the school had a graduating class of 136.

== History ==
The Old Gardiner High School building was designed by Francis H. Fassett and built in 1870.

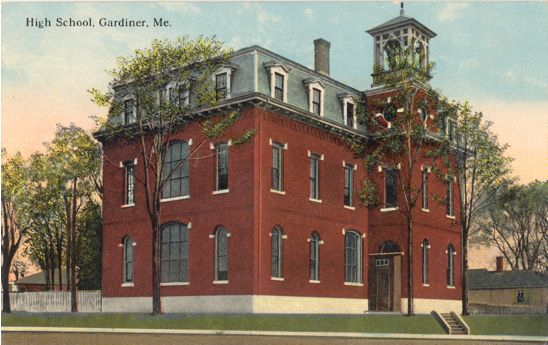
Old Gardiner High School pictured on a 1912 postcard

The Maine Ornithological Society met at the high school in 1907.

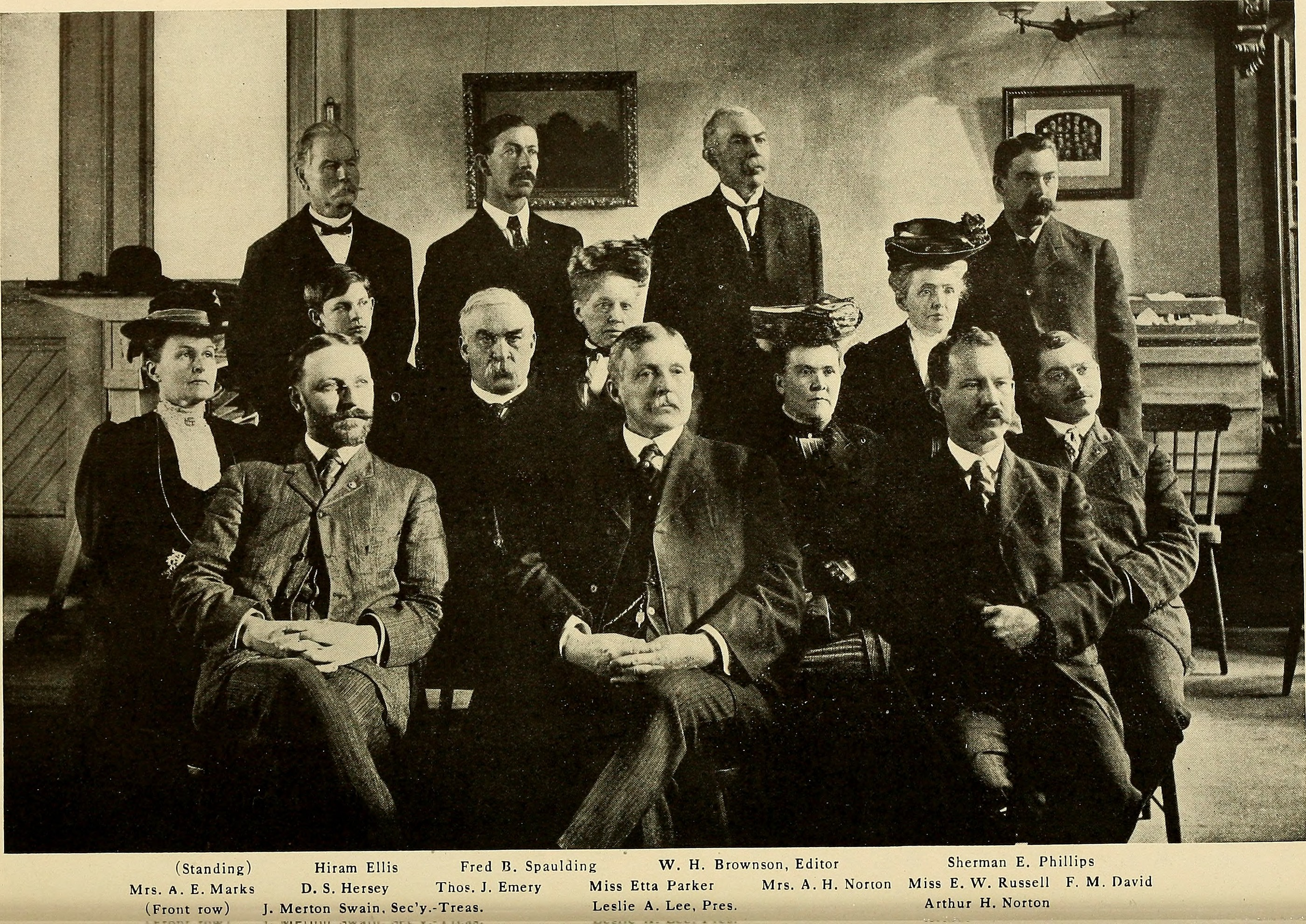
Photo of the Maine Ornithological Society from 1907

== Athletics ==
Bobby Messenger, Major League Baseball player and sheriff of Sagadahoc County, was a mainstay on Gardiner's sports teams in the first decade of the 20th century.

The school has a rivalry with Cony High School.

== Alumni ==
Alumni of the school include Stanford University professor David Nivison who was valedictorian at the high school in 1940 and Poet Edward Arlington Robinson who graduated from the school when ceremonies were held at the Gardiner Coliseum. Vivian Blanche Small graduated from Gardiner High School in 1892. College basketball coach Max Good graduated from Gardiner High School.

The school has been mentioned numerous times on the HGTV program Maine Cabin Masters, as several cast members attended the school. One program project involved the crew constructing an outdoor earth science building for the school.

== See also ==
- List of high school football rivalries more than 100 years old
