= Benjamin Clark Cutler =

American merchant and sheriff

Benjamin Clarke Cutler

Sheriff of Norfolk County, Massachusetts
- In office July 31, 1798 – April 1810
- Preceded by: Atherton Thayer
- Succeeded by: Elijah Crane

Personal details
- Born: September 15, 1756 Boston, Massachusetts
- Died: April 1810 Jamaica Plain, Massachusetts
- Spouse(s): Mary Sheafe; Sarah Mitchell Hyrne
- Relations: Ward McAllister (grandson); Julia Howe (granddaughter); Samuel W. Francis (grandson)
- Children: 6
- Occupation: Sheriff, merchant

Benjamin Clarke Cutler (September 15, 1756 – April 1810) was a Boston merchant, who also served as the sheriff of Norfolk County, Massachusetts from 1798 to 1810.

== Early life ==
Cutler was born in Boston, Massachusetts on September 15, 1756 to John Cutler (1723–1805) and Mary (née Clarke) Cutler. His mother was the sister of a wealthy bachelor, Benjamin Clarke, who was an attorney.

== Career ==
For many years, Cutler was a prominent merchant in Boston.

On July 31, 1798, Cutler was appointed and began serving as Sheriff of Norfolk County, Massachusetts. He served in this role until his death in April 1810.

== Family life ==
Cutler was first married to Mary Sheafe (d. 1788), the daughter of a British officer. Together, they were the parents of:

- Mary Ann Cutler (1786–1788), who died young.

In 1794, Cutler married Sarah Mitchell (1761–1836) of Waccamaw Plantation, and Georgetown, South Carolina, Sarah Mitchell's mother was the sister of Francis Marion, the "Swamp Fox" of the American Revolution. Sarah was the widow of Dr. William Alexander Hyrne. Together, they had the following children:

- Mary Eliza Cutler, who married Dr. John Wakefield Francis (1789–1861) in 1829.
- Julia Rush Cutler (1795–1824), who married Samuel Ward III (1786–1839) of Prime, Ward & King, in 1812.
- Rev. Benjamin Clark Cutler (1798–1863), the rector of St. Anne's Church in Brooklyn, who married Harriett Bancroft.
- Louisa Charlotte Cutler (1801–1869), who married Matthew Hall McAllister (1800–1865).
- Francis Marion Cutler, who married Caroline D. Martin, daughter of Jason Martin.

Cutler died at the age of 54 at his residence on Centre Street, Jamaica Plain, in April 1810.

=== Descendants ===
Through his daughter Julia, he was the grandfather of Julia Ward Howe (1819–1910). Through his daughter Louisa, he was the grandfather of Ward McAllister (1827–1895). Through his daughter Eliza, he was the grandfather of Dr. Samuel Ward Francis (1835–1886).
