= Ward McAllister =

American socialite (1827–1895)

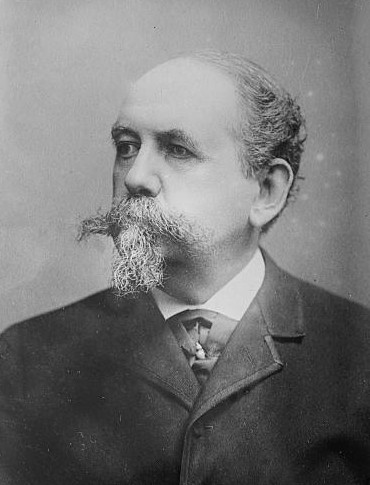
- McAllister, c. 1890
- Born: Samuel Ward McAllister; December 28, 1827; Savannah, Georgia, U.S.
- Died: January 31, 1895 (aged 67); New York City, U.S.
- Spouse: Sarah Taintor Gibbons (m. 1853)
- Children: 3
- Parent(s): Matthew Hall McAllister; Louisa Charlotte Cutler
- Relatives: Samuel Ward (uncle); Julia Ward Howe (cousin); Samuel Cutler Ward (cousin); Benjamin Clark Cutler (grandfather)

Samuel Ward McAllister (December 28, 1827 – January 31, 1895) was a popular arbiter of social taste in the Gilded Age of America, widely accepted as the authority to which families could be classified as the cream of New York society (The Four Hundred). His listings were questioned by those excluded from them, and his motivation of self-aggrandizement was noted.

== Early life ==
He was born Samuel Ward McAllister to a socially prominent Savannah, Georgia, judicial family, his parents Matthew Hall McAllister and Louisa Charlotte (née Cutler) McAllister.

Through his maternal aunt, Julia Rush Cutler, and her husband, Samuel Ward, McAllister was a first cousin of Julia Ward Howe and Samuel Cutler Ward, the lobbyist whose first wife, Emily Astor, had been the daughter of William Backhouse Astor Sr. and a granddaughter of John Jacob Astor. His maternal grandparents were Benjamin Clark Cutler, Norfolk County Sheriff, and Sarah (née Mitchell) Cutler.

In 1850, McAllister traveled to California with his father during the Gold Rush and became one of the partners in the law firm McAllister & Sons. Before becoming a fixture in New York society, McAllister studied law in Savannah, Georgia, and gained a reputation as a skilled attorney and civic leader within the Southern elite prior to the Civil War.

== New York Society ==
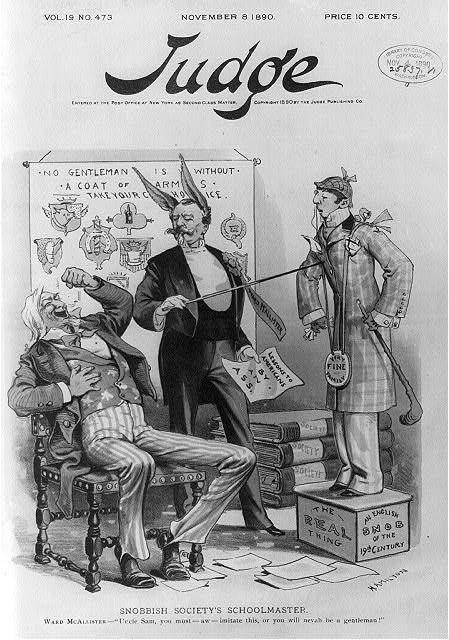
"Snobbish Society's Schoolmaster". Caricature of Ward McAllister as an ass telling Uncle Sam he must imitate "an English snob of the 19th century" or he "will nevah be a gentleman". Published in Judge, November 8, 1890.

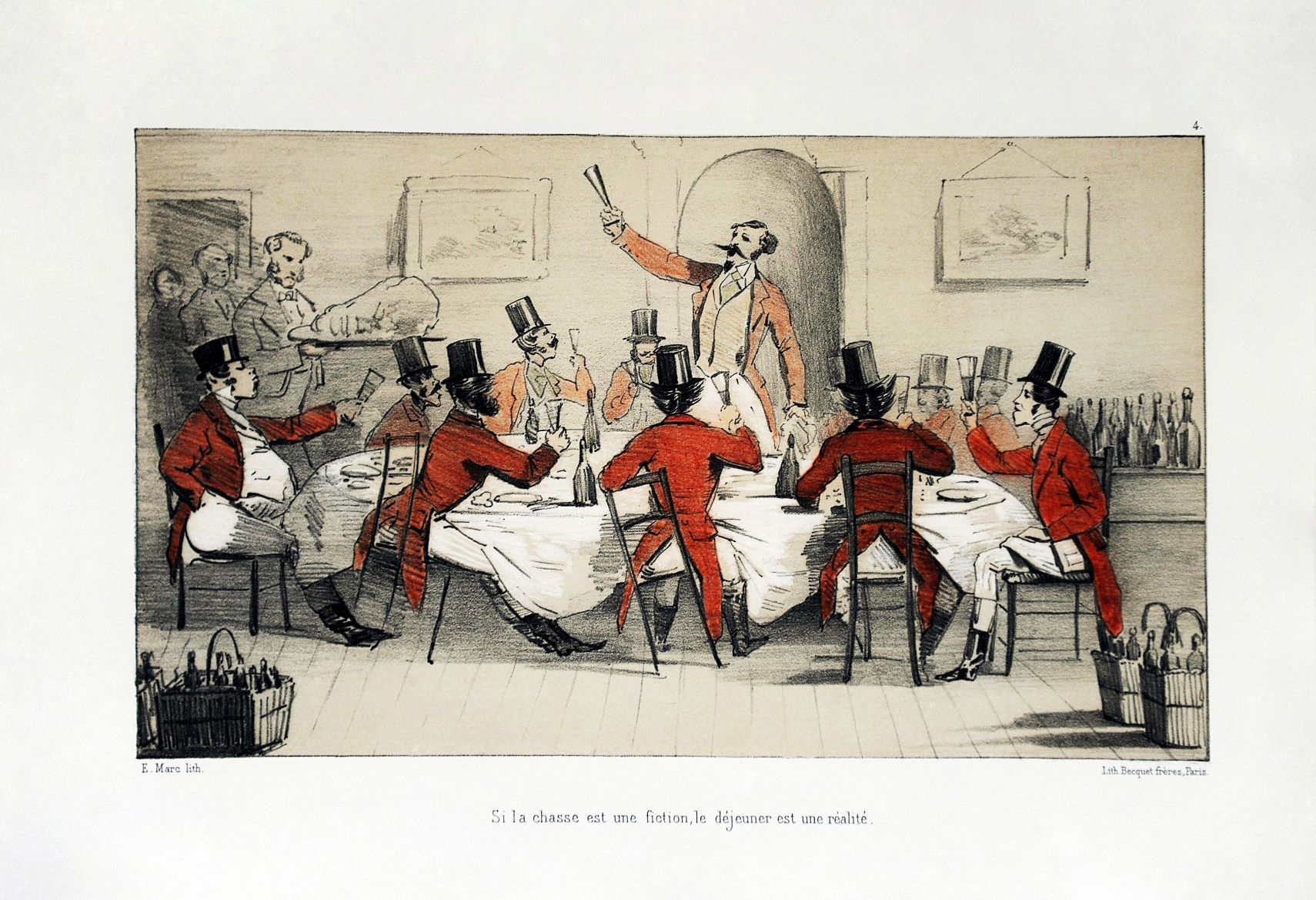
Pierre-Eugène Marc (1819-1885), "If the hunt is fiction, lunch is a reality", 1860, Ward McAllister with the Pau Hunt in 1858.

McAllister wrote that after his marriage in 1853, he bought a farm on Narragansett Bay, planted trees and left for a three-year journey throughout Europe's great cities and spas—Bath, Pau, Bad Nauheim, and the like—where he observed the mannerisms of other wealthy Americans and titled nobility, returning to New York with his wife and two small children on October 15, 1858. (Note: McAllister wrote (Chapter IV) that this trip included London and then Paris for the Universal Exposition of 1855 (incorrectly referenced by him as 1857) followed by the baptism of the Imperial Prince on June 11, 1856. If he attended both events in Paris, he would have returned to Paris after his first European winter (1855-1856) spent on the Arno River. He employees first person plural for payment of meals, indicating his family was with him possibly until their return in October 1858. His second and third winters (1856-57 and 1857-58) were at Pau. (Chapter VI)) Using his wife's wealth and his own social connections, he sought to become a tastemaker amongst New York's "Knickerbocracy", a collection of old merchant and landowning families who traced their lineage back to the days of colonial New Amsterdam. Above all in his life was his desire for social recognition by what he termed the Ton, i.e., the cream of society.

Although purported to be an index of New York's best families, McAllister's list was suspiciously top-heavy with nouveau riche industrialists and his southern allies, seeking a new start in the nation's financial capital after the American Civil War. He referred to his patroness, Caroline Astor as his "Mystic Rose". He was also an early summer colonist of Newport, Rhode Island, and was largely responsible for turning the town into a Mecca for the Gilded Age, which made him a society darling.

Among the undesirables McAllister endeavored to exclude from the charmed circle of the Four Hundred were the many nouveau riche Midwesterners who poured into New York seeking social recognition. In 1893, he wrote a column about the 1893 World's Columbian Exposition in which he urged that if Chicago society hostesses wanted to be taken seriously, they should hire French chefs and "not frappé their wine too much". The Chicago Journal replied: "The mayor will not frappé his wine too much. He will frappé it just enough so the guests can blow the foam off the tops of the glasses without a vulgar exhibition of lung and lip power. His ham sandwiches, sinkers, and ... pigs' feet, will be triumphs of the gastronomic art."

McAllister's downfall came when he published a book of memoirs entitled Society as I Have Found It in 1890. The book, and his hunger for media attention, did little to endear him to the old guard, who valued their privacy in an era when millionaires were the equivalent of modern movie stars.

=== "The Four Hundred" ===
McAllister coined the phrase "The Four Hundred" by declaring that there were "only 400 people in fashionable New York Society". According to him, this was the number of people in New York who really mattered; the people who felt at ease in the ballrooms of high society. "If you go outside that number", he warned, "you strike people who are either not at ease in a ballroom or else make other people not at ease". The number was popularly supposed to be the capacity of Caroline Schermerhorn Astor's ballroom. The lavish parties were held at the Astor mansion.

On February 16, 1892, McAllister named the official list of The Four Hundred in The New York Times. The Four Million, the title of a book by O. Henry, was a reaction to this phrase, expressing O. Henry's opinion that every human being in New York was worthy of notice.

=== Society of Patriarchs ===
In 1872, McAllister founded the "Society of Patriarchs" which was a group of 25 gentlemen from New York Society. The group of 25 were "representative men of worth, respectability, and responsibility". Beginning with the 1885–1886 season, the Patriarchs threw a ball each year, known as the Patriarchs Ball, to which each member was entitled to invite four ladies and five gentlemen, thereby establishing the invitees as fit for society. The first Patriarchs Ball was held at Delmonico's, with the Balls, to which it was difficult to obtain invitations, receiving high press coverage. The Patriarchs Ball inspired similar balls, including the Ihpetonga Ball, which was considered "the most important social event of the season in Brooklyn".

The Society dissolved two years after McAllister's death in 1897 due to a lack of interest.

== Personal life ==
On March 15, 1853, McAllister married a Georgia-born heiress who was then living in Madison, New Jersey, Sarah Taintor Gibbons (1829–1909), the daughter of William Gibbons (1794–1852) and Abigail Louisa (née Taintor) Gibbons (1791–1844). Her grandfather was politician, lawyer, and steamboat owner Thomas Gibbons. (Note: Sarah's grandfather, Thomas Gibbons, was the plaintiff in the landmark U.S. Supreme Court case Gibbons v. Ogden and was a mentor to Cornelius Vanderbilt.) Her father built the Gibbons Mansion in Madison, New Jersey, which her brother sold to Daniel Drew after their father's death, and which Drew donated to found Drew Theological Seminary (now known as Drew University).

Together, Ward and Sarah were the parents of:

- Louise Ward McAllister (1854–1923), who in 1920 married A. Nelson Lewis, a linguist who owned the 600 acre "old Lewis estate" at Havre de Grace, Maryland that had been in the family since 1806. She was engaged to George Barclay Ward (1845–1906) at the time of his death in 1907. (Note: George Barclay Ward, the son of Susan Barclay Parsons (1822–1893) and Montagnie Ward (1812–1879), cousin of William Barclay Parsons and brother-in-law of Luther Kountze, was a widower of Jane Mary de Pau (1848–1886), with whom he had three children. Louise and George were engaged for fifteen to eighteen years before his death.)
- Ward McAllister Jr. (1855–1908), an 1880 Harvard Law School graduate, who became a San Francisco lawyer who served as the first Federal district judge of the Territory of Alaska, beginning in 1884 and was responsible for the arrest of Sheldon Jackson. (Note: Appointed by President Chester Arthur "through the political pull" of his friends including the Alaska Commercial Company, Judge McAllister, an alcoholic, was removed from office after a year on the bench due to his indiscretions. Although incorrectly referred to as McAllister's nephew instead of his son, he was described "a man of enormous power" who was incompetent.)
- Heyward Hall McAllister (1859–1925), who married Janie Champion Garmany (b. 1867) of Savannah in 1892. In what became a minor scandal when it was made public, the couple was secretly wed first in 1884, then in 1887, and lastly in 1892. They later divorced and he married Melanie Jeanne Renke (d. 1939), who was born in France and did not speak English, in 1908. (Note: His first wife, Janie or Jennie, remarried in 1898 to Augustus Philip Brandt of William Brandt's Sons and Co.)

== Death ==
McAllister died while dining alone, and in social disgrace for his writings, at New York's Union Club, in January 1895. His funeral, held on February 5, was well attended by many society figures of the day, including Chauncey Depew and Cornelius Vanderbilt II. McAllister is interred at Green-Wood Cemetery in Brooklyn, New York.

== In popular culture ==
McAllister is one of the real-life characters in Gore Vidal's historical novel 1876.

He is portrayed by Nathan Lane in the American television series The Gilded Age.
