= Blarney Stone =

Limestone block in Blarney Castle

Coordinates: 51.929091°N 8.570564°W

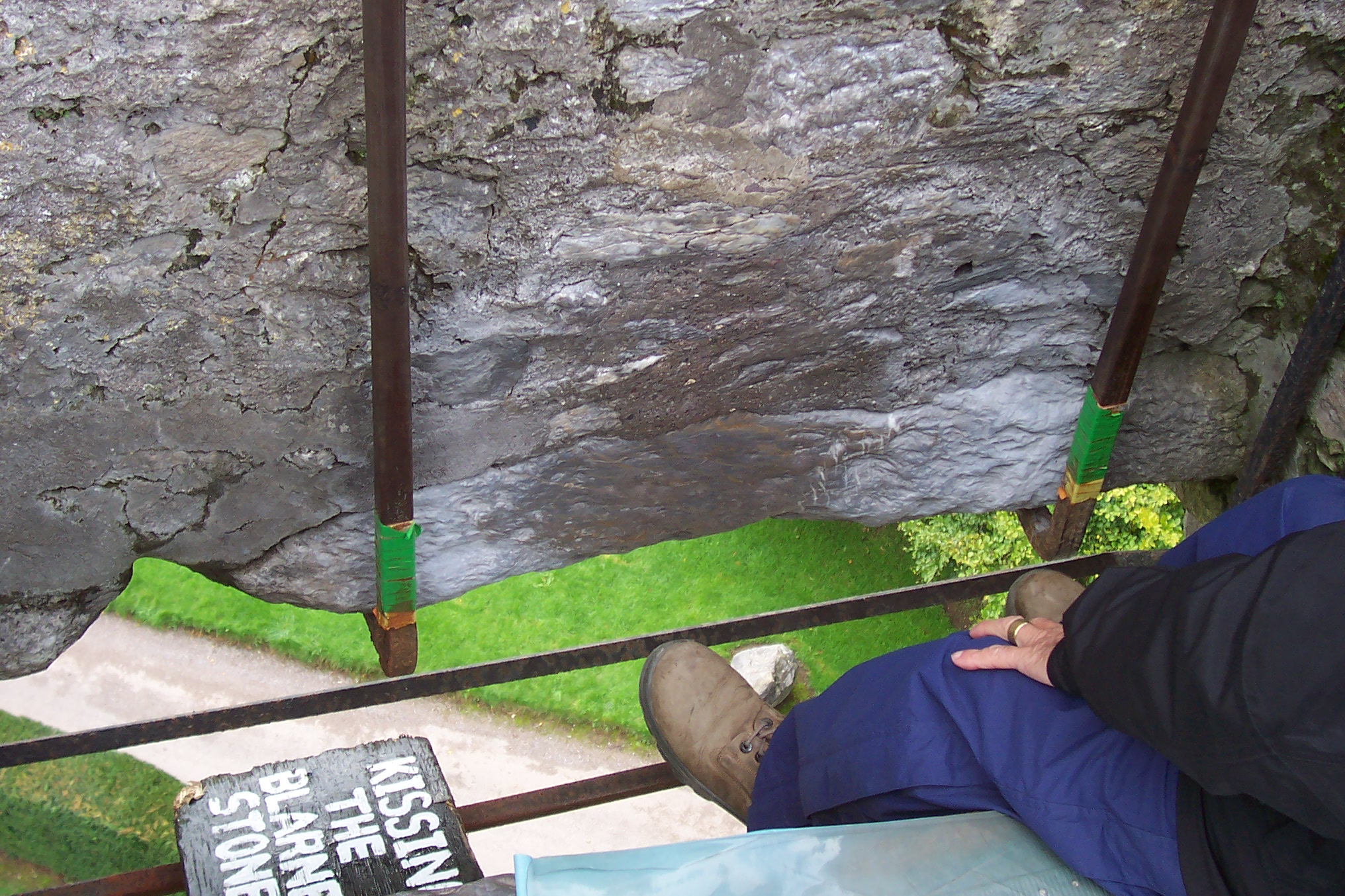
The Blarney Stone

The Blarney Stone (Irish: Cloch na Blarnan) is a block of Carboniferous limestone built into the battlements of Blarney Castle, Blarney, about 8 kilometres (5 miles) from the centre of Cork City, Ireland. According to legend, kissing the stone endows the kisser with the gift of the gab (great eloquence or skill at flattery). The stone was set into a tower of the castle in 1446. The castle is a popular tourist site in Ireland, attracting visitors from all over the world to kiss the stone and tour the castle and its gardens.

The word blarney has come to mean "clever, flattering, or coaxing talk". Irish politician John O'Connor Power defined it this way: "Blarney is something more than mere flattery. It is flattery sweetened by humour and flavoured by wit. Those who mix with Irish folk have many examples of it in their everyday experience." Letitia Elizabeth Landon described its contemporary meaning in an article entitled "Blarney Castle" in 1832.

== Origins ==
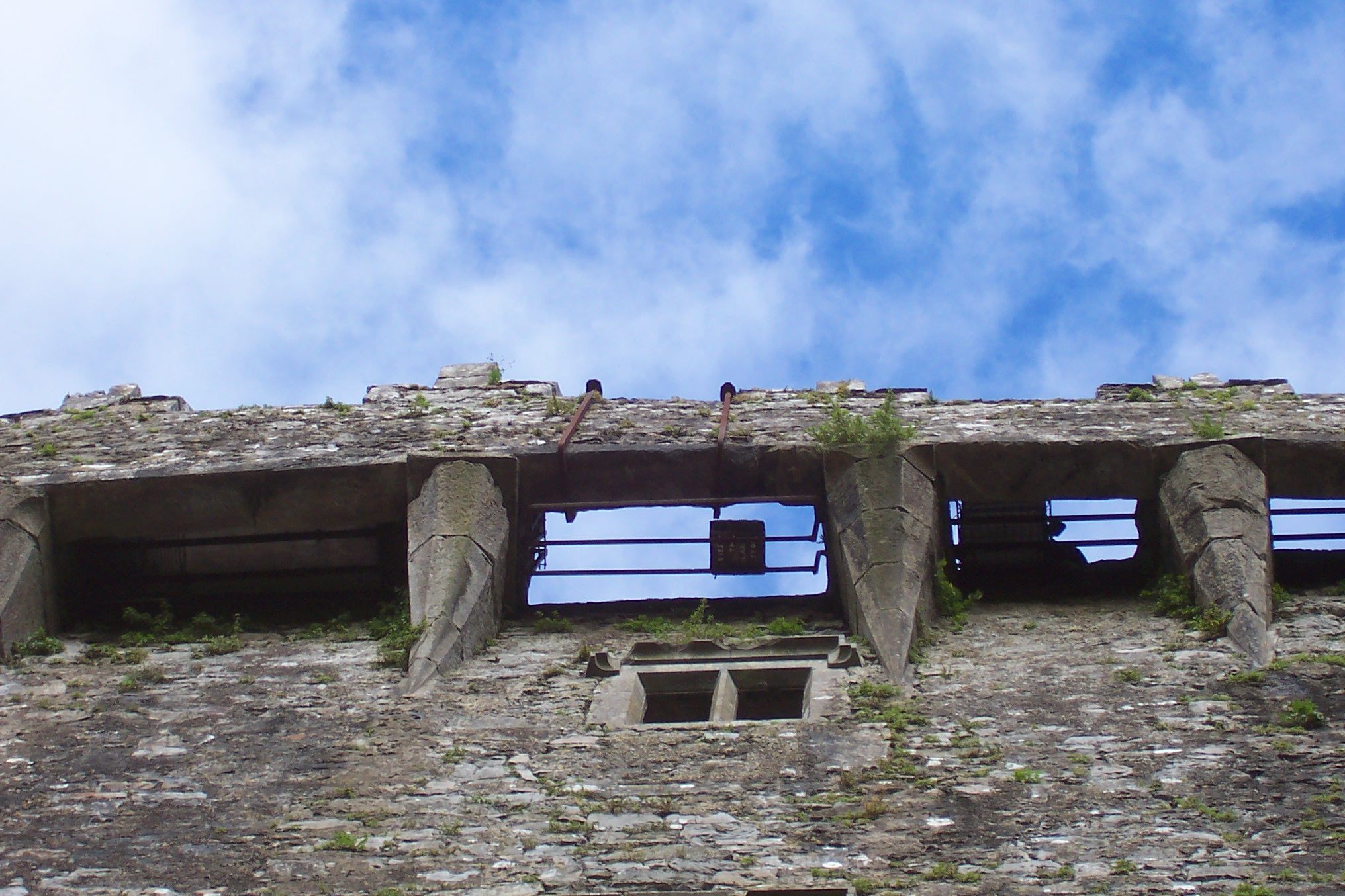
View of the Blarney Stone from the ground

A number of stories attempt to explain the origin of the stone and the surrounding legend. An early story involves the goddess Clíodhna. Cormac Laidir MacCarthy, the builder of Blarney Castle, being involved in a lawsuit in the 15th century, appealed to Clíodhna for her assistance. She told MacCarthy to kiss the first stone he found in the morning on his way to court, and he did so, with the result that he pleaded his case with great eloquence and won. Thus, the Blarney Stone is said to impart "the ability to deceive without offending". MacCarthy then incorporated it into the parapet of the castle.

The proprietors of Blarney Castle list several other explanations of the origins of the stone on their website. Many of these suppose that the stone had previously been in Ireland, was taken to Scotland, and then returned to Ireland in 1314. The stories listed include one suggesting that the stone was presented to Cormac MacCarthy by Robert the Bruce in 1314 in recognition of his support in the Battle of Bannockburn. This legend holds that this was a piece of the Stone of Scone and was installed at MacCarthy's castle of Blarney. Although colourful, this folk legend does not account for the fact that it supposes that the stone was removed from Scotland 18 years before Bannockburn. Moreover, an analysis by geologists at the University of Glasgow in 2014 found the stone's geochemical signature matches limestone found in the Blarney area.

== Ritual ==
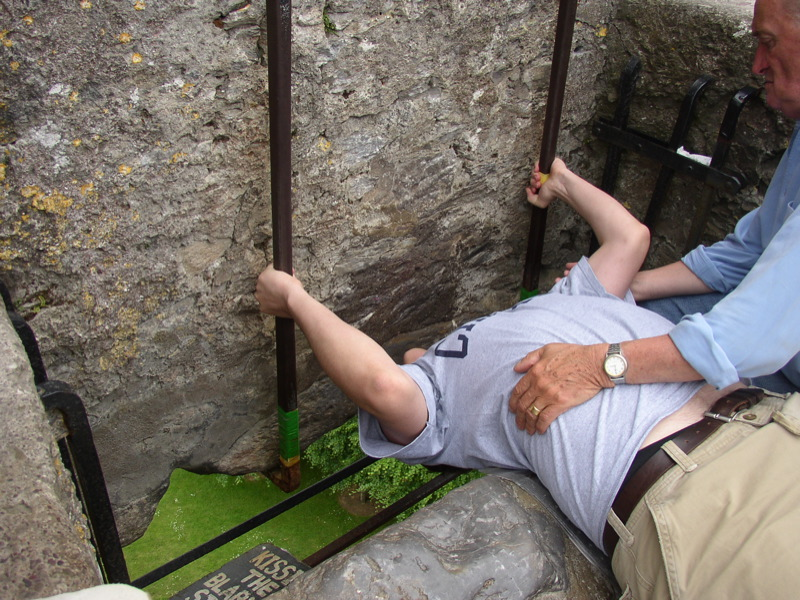
Person kissing the Blarney Stone

The ritual of kissing the Blarney Stone, according to the castle's proprietors, has been performed by "millions of people", including "world statesmen, literary giants [and] legends of the silver screen". The kiss, however, is not casually achieved. To touch the stone with one's lips, the participant must ascend to the castle's peak, then lean over backwards on the parapet's edge. This is traditionally achieved with the help of an assistant. Although the parapet is now fitted with wrought-iron guide rails and protective crossbars, the ritual can still trigger attacks of acrophobia.

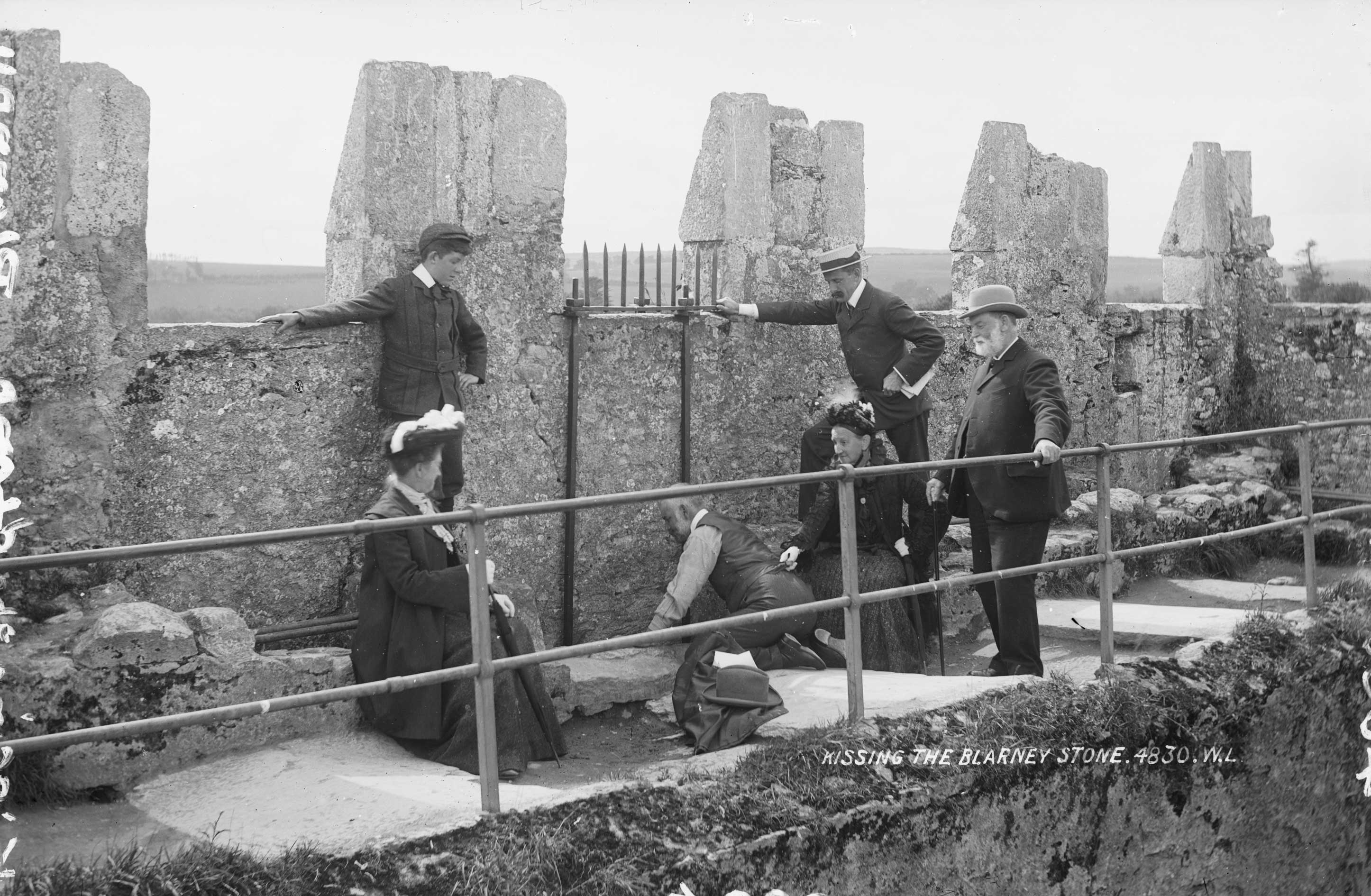
Kissing the stone in 1897, before the safeguards were installed.

Before the safeguards were installed, the kiss was performed with real risk to life and limb, as participants were grasped by the ankles and dangled bodily from the height.

William Henry Hurlbert wrote in 1888 that the legend of the stone seemed to be less than a hundred years old at that time, suggesting the tradition began late in the 18th century. The legend of the Blarney Stone was described in A classical dictionary of the vulgar tongue by Francis Grose, printed 1785.

== Legend ==
'Tis there's the stone that whoever kisses
He never misses to grow eloquent;
'Tis he may clamber to a lady's chamber,
Or become a member of Parliament.
"A noble spouter he'll sure turn out, or
An out and outer to be let alone;
Don't try to hinder him, or to bewilder him,
For he is a pilgrim from the Blarney stone."

— Francis Sylvester Mahony

It is claimed that the synonymy of "blarney" with "empty flattery" or "beguiling talk" derives from one of two sources. One story involves the goddess Clíodhna and Cormac Laidir MacCarthy (see "Origins" above). Another legend suggests that Queen Elizabeth I requested Cormac MacDermot MacCarthy, the Lord of Blarney, be deprived of his traditional land rights. Cormac travelled to see the queen, but was certain he would not persuade her to change her mind as he wasn't an effective speaker. He met an old woman on the way who told him that anyone who kissed a particular stone in Blarney Castle would be given the gift of eloquent speech. Cormac went on to persuade the queen that he should not be deprived of his land.

Echoing the supposed power of the stone, an Irish bard of the early 19th century, Francis Sylvester Mahony, added several (humorous) lines to Richard Alfred Millikin's "The Groves of Blarney" (right).

According to tradition at Texas Tech University, a stone fragment displayed on its campus since 1939 is a missing piece of the Blarney Stone. How this was determined is unknown.

== In music and literature ==
The traditional Irish song "The Blarney Stone" (Roud 4800) has been recorded by artists including Tom Lenihan, Margaret Barry and Bob Davenport.

"The Blarney Stone" is also the name of a song by American rock band Ween.

In the Sherlock Holmes radio dramatisation "The Adventure of the Blarney Stone" (first broadcast on 18 March 1946), a man attempting to kiss the Blarney Stone falls to his death. Holmes' investigation reveals this as a murder, the man's boots having been surreptitiously greased before the attempt.

To accompany a picture of the Castle by William Henry Bartlett in Fisher's Drawing Room Scrap Book, 1832, Letitia Elizabeth Landon gives a number of examples of blarney from historical personages.

In Chuck Palahniuk's novel Fight Club (1996), the protagonist reminisces about urinating on the Blarney stone on a trip to Ireland after leaving college.

An episode of The Busy World of Richard Scarry, "Patrick Pig Learns to Talk", involves trying to get a young pig to speak by kissing the Blarney stone.

== See also ==
- List of individual rocks
- Cloch Labhrais
