= William Henry Hurlbert =

American journalist

William Henry Hurlbert (July 3, 1827—September 4, 1895) was an American journalist and the possible author of “The Diary of a Public Man,” published in the North American Review in 1879. His responsibility for the Diary—once dubbed the “most gigantic” problem of uncertain authorship in American historical writing—was carefully concealed and has only recently been established.

== Early life ==
Hurlbert was born in Charleston, South Carolina. His father, Martin Luther Hurlbut, a Unitarian minister and schoolmaster from Massachusetts, resettled in South Carolina in 1812 and lived there for most of the next two decades. The elder Hurlbut remained a self-conscious Yankee who nonetheless owned slaves. Hurlbert's mother, Margaret Ashburner Morford Hurlbut, his father's second wife, was a native of Princeton, New Jersey. Hurlbert's parents moved to Philadelphia in 1831, where his father founded a successful school.

Fragmentary evidence suggests that Hurlbert's childhood was difficult and intense. The gifted son plainly was his father's star pupil, adept in rhetoric, foreign languages, and classical literature. One may surmise that he was pushed to excel. His subsequent decision to change the way he spelled the family name may have distanced him from an overly demanding paterfamilias.

Martin Luther Hurlbut died unexpectedly in 1843. William and his mother and sisters promptly returned to South Carolina. There the precocious sixteen-year-old came under the influence of his half brother, Stephen Augustus Hurlbut, an aspiring lawyer and politician who was over a decade William's senior. Stephen—who later moved to Illinois, became an ally of Abraham Lincoln’s, and served as a Union general during the Civil War—was attempting in the early 1840s to carve out a niche in Charleston society. He persuaded William to study for the Unitarian ministry.

When Hurlbert enrolled at Harvard College in 1845, he had spent his most recent two years in Charleston and was regarded as a Southerner. He earned an undergraduate degree in 1847 and a divinity degree in 1849. Following college he traveled extensively in Europe. His personal charm, his gifts as a linguist, and his ability of “acquiring knowledge as if by magic” enabled him to pass easily as “a Frenchman in France, an Italian in Italy, [and] a Spaniard in Spanish countries.” He served a brief stint as a Unitarian minister in Salem, Massachusetts, where he was said to be “extremely popular and very much admired as a preacher.”

== Career ==
An intellectual and social prodigy, Hurlbert wrote with flair and found that he could make a good living with his pen. For almost thirty years he worked for or edited newspapers. His skill as a wordsmith provided the foundation for his career. His first assignment as a daily journalist was a legendary success. Between 1857 and 1860, he wrote editorials for Henry J. Raymond’s New York Times. There he promptly displayed “those talents for which he became remarkable”—“quickness of perception, vividness of ideas, brilliancy of style,” and the “great art” of “writing for the press.” His “style and scholarship” were easily recognized and instantly “attracted attention.” He was “au courant with the transpiring of events abroad and at home;” he had historical perspective; and he was “extremely ready” with “rapid comment” when writing against a deadline about late-breaking news. Although James Gordon Bennett, Sr.’s New York Herald and Horace Greeley’s New York Tribune had more readers, the Times too had national perspective and commanded notice. Raymond made Hurlbert his right-hand man and second in command. During this time, Hurlbert also wrote the comic play Americans in Paris, which had a successful premiere at Wallack's Theatre in 1858.

Political differences that came to a head during the 1860 presidential campaign forced Raymond and Hurlbert to part ways. Raymond remained a moderate Republican who supported Lincoln. Hurlbert, who feared that the election of a Republican president would create dangerous repercussions in the South, favored Stephen A. Douglas, Lincoln’s Democratic rival. Hurlbert watched helplessly as the Union unraveled following Lincoln’s victory. An abortive personal peacemaking expedition led to his incarceration in Richmond, Virginia, the Confederate capital, from July 1861 until August 1862.

In 1862 Hurlbert joined the New York World, working directly under Manton Marble, the paper’s young owner and soon a fast friend. For the next two decades, the most productive of Hurlbert’s career, he wrote for the World. He, Marble, and two other talented journalists, Ivory Chamberlain and David Goodman Croly, made the World the most influential Democratic newspaper in the city and a kingmaker in national politics.

Hurlbert’s rambunctious prose was a key reason for the World’s success. He brought his forceful, fluid writing style to bear on a wide range of topics—politics, international affairs, history, and literature. In 1869 Eugene Benson, the American painter, published an incisive assessment of Hurlbert’s writing. In Benson’s view, Hurlbert had a gift for capturing the cadences of “human speech.” His style had “sweep and dash.” His “alliterative phrases” and “rich fund of expression” enabled him to make “the gravest and heaviest” political subjects come instantly alive. “No man’s articles are more invariably recognized,” Benson noted; Hurlbert's “sang froid, audacity, playfulness, and fluency” stood out. Benson admitted that he disliked Hurlbert's politics:

The historian of the American press will have to say that while the slave was lifting his shackled hands to the North, and the land was agitated with a great moral and political question; while the men of justice and benevolence were sweating with the task of emancipation, and our armies were in the bleeding shock of battle, the most brilliant talent of the New York press was used to persifle the liberators of the slave and the chief saviours of the Republic.

With “cold irony and princely disdain” but always in “the best of humor,” Hurlbert satirized the “moral element” that occupied such a central position in American and English culture. He directed his “superb scorn” at “what he would call moral mush or moral twaddle.” Yet Benson confessed that he was hypnotized by Hurlbert's “bold touch” and by the spectacle of a “polished and adroit mind” in “full play.” His writing was “always graphic” and “never prosaic.” His skill with the pen was matched by “the elegant fluency of his conversation.” Benson judged him “the only artist among American journalists.”

In 1876 Hurlbert became the World’s editor-in-chief. He answered to Thomas A. Scott, who hoped that owning a newspaper might improve his chances of getting a federal subsidy for the Texas & Pacific Railroad. Subsequently, Scott sold the World to Jay Gould, who also acquired Scott's interest in the Texas & Pacific. However talented, Hurlbert was ill-suited to edit a newspaper. His circle of elite friendships and his rarefied aesthetic sensibilities distanced him from the mass public. He did little to make the paper popular. Instead its circulation dwindled and it lost money. In early 1883, Gould threatened to sell the World, but Hurlbert asked for a reprieve while attempting to put it “on a paying basis.” He fired many editors and reporters, but did not succeed for long in staving off the inevitable. A few months later, Joseph Pulitzer bought the World from Gould. Unlike Hurlbert, Pulitzer knew how to attract readers.

== The Diary of a Public Man ==
“The Diary of a Public Man” was published anonymously in 1879 when Hurlbert was editing the World and at the height of his power and influence. It claimed to offer verbatim accounts of secret conversations between a long-time Washington insider and Stephen A. Douglas, William H. Seward, and Abraham Lincoln himself—among others—in the desperate weeks just before the start of the Civil War. Historians have long been frustrated in pinpointing the Diary's author or determining its authenticity. Frank Maloy Anderson, writing in 1948, concluded that Gilded Age lobbyist Sam Ward (1814–1884) wrote the Diary, but that its contents were substantially concocted.

But in 2010, historian Daniel W. Crofts reopened the Diary to fresh scrutiny. He believes Hurlbert to be the author, based on striking parallels between the Diary and Hurlbert's distinctive writing style. Crofts also paired with statistician David Holmes to use stylometry, the statistical analysis of literary style, which delivers a verdict that reinforces the case for Hurlbert.

Crofts notes that the Diary was not a diary. It was instead a memoir, probably written shortly before it appeared in print in 1879. The word “Diary” was intentionally misleading. But Crofts also contends that the Diary's contents were largely genuine—aside from its fabricated hocus-pocus regarding a nonexistent diarist. The Diary repeatedly introduces previously concealed information that was corroborated only after its publication. It contains precise details regarding the struggle to shape Lincoln's cabinet, the composition of his inaugural address, and the secret negotiations between Seward and anti-secession leaders in Virginia.

The Diary reflected Hurlbert's distinctive outlook, which was neither Northern nor Southern. Sooner than most Americans, he realized that his native South Carolina was on a collision course with New England, where he studied and lived from the mid-1840s to the mid-1850s. Although drawn for a time to the antislavery critique of the South, he had enough affinity with both sides of the sectional conflict to avoid becoming a partisan for either. He sensed that both sides were mutually blind to the potential catastrophe that their antagonism was creating.

Hurlbert remained conflicted after the war started. He wanted the Union preserved, but he feared that prolonged fighting would so embitter the two sides as to make reunion impossible. He opposed emancipation on grounds that it would prompt the South to fight longer and harder. When the war finally ended, he favored a rapid restoration of the Southern states to the Union. He never thought the war should have been fought, and he never accepted the idea that it could be justified by its outcome. He thereby swam against the dominant tide of postwar Northern public opinion. His alleged Diary suggested that Northern Democrats, conservative Republicans, and Southern Unionists had acted more responsibly in early 1861 than extreme men on either side, who blindly stumbled into the abyss.

Just as Hurlbert was surreptitiously creating the Diary, he also spearheaded the campaign to move a 3,500-year-old obelisk, “Cleopatra's Needle,” from the Egyptian port of Alexandria to New York City's Central Park, where it stands today on Greywecke Knoll, not far from the Metropolitan Museum of Art. In differing ways, the Diary and the obelisk each reflected Hurlbert's historical sensibilities.

== Later life ==
After losing control of the World, Hurlbert lived abroad. He published books on Ireland and France, each of which used the format of a travel diary to offer his opinions on current politics. His last years were marred by a humiliating scandal. Hurlbert denied that he had written a sheaf of salacious letters to his London mistress, Gladys Evelyn, but a British court indicted him for perjury in 1891, and Hurlbert fled incognito to Italy, where he died in 1895.

== Bibliography ==
- Crofts, Daniel W (2010), A secession crisis enigma : William Henry Hurlbert and "The diary of a public man", Louisiana State University Press, ISBN 978-0-8071-3591-4, OCLC 435711285
