= The Diary of a Public Man =

Book by William Henry Hurlbert

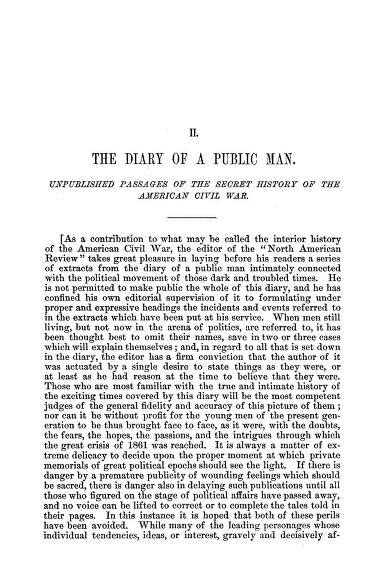
- Publisher: North American Review
- Publication date: 1879

The Diary of a Public Man was first published anonymously in the North American Review in 1879. Its entries are dated between December 28, 1860, and March 15, 1861, the desperate weeks just before the start of the American Civil War. The Diary appeared to offer verbatim accounts, penned by a long-time Washington insider, of behind-the-scenes discussions at the very highest levels during the greatest crisis USA had yet faced. Its quotations attributed to the key principals Stephen A. Douglas, William H. Seward, and Abraham Lincoln have been accepted by historians. David Potter, a leading specialist on 1860-61, said it contained "astonishing" revelations made by someone "who possessed an authoritative personal knowledge of affairs at the time of secession.” In the 21st century historians concluded that the diary was written by journalist William Henry Hurlbert in 1879, and represents not a real diary but a memoir. It contains both factual information as well as a few fictional elements.

== Contents of the Diary ==
Douglas, the leading Northern Democrat who defeated Lincoln in 1858 to retain his Senate seat but who then lost to him in the 1860 presidential election, reached out to his former antagonist as the crisis deepened. Lincoln, who wanted to keep Northern Democrats "close to the Administration on the naked Union issue", proved receptive. Nothing better symbolized the rapport between the two Illinois rivals than an incident reported by the diarist on inauguration day. As Lincoln prepared to speak, he scarcely could find room for his hat on the "miserable little rickety table" that had been provided for the occasion. Douglas reached forward, "took it with a smile and held it during the delivery of the address". This spontaneous gesture "was a trifling act, but a symbolical one, and not to be forgotten, and it attracted much attention all around me".

The diarist and Douglas both pinned their hopes for a peaceful settlement on Seward, who emerged as Lincoln's Secretary of State after having lost the Republican presidential nomination in 1860. Although his long public career as governor and senator from New York earned him a somewhat undeserved reputation for stigmatizing the South, Seward attempted during the secession winter to find a middle ground that would preserve the peace and hold the Union together. He became, in the eyes of the diarist, "the one man in whose ability and moderation the conservative people at the North have most confidence".

The Diary of a Public Man recounts the twists and turns as two successive presidents, the repudiated James Buchanan and the untested Lincoln, attempted to figure out what to do about Fort Sumter, the besieged federal fortress located on an artificial island at the mouth of Charleston harbor, South Carolina. The Diary's tone is that of urgency.

== Controversy ==
The diary's author and genuinity are not clear. The editor of the North American Review concealed the identity of its author, and historians have found it difficult to crack the secret. Jacques Barzun and Henry F. Graff’s reference work, The Modern Researcher, singles out the Diary for presenting the "most gigantic" problem of uncertain authorship in American historical writing. Historian Frank Maloy Anderson, after spending years in detective work, concluded in 1948 that lobbyist Sam Ward (1814–1884) wrote the Diary, but that its contents were substantially concocted.

Historian Daniel W. Crofts recently reopened the Diary to fresh scrutiny and concluded that it was not a diary, but a memoir, probably written shortly before it appeared in print in 1879. The word "Diary" was intentionally misleading. Crofts established that its author was New York journalist William Henry Hurlbert (1827–1895), based on striking parallels between the Diary and Hurlbert's distinctive writing style. Crofts paired with statistician David Holmes to use stylometry, the statistical analysis of literary style, which delivers a verdict that reinforces the case for Hurlbert. Acclaimed as "the most brilliant talent of the New York press" and "the only artist among American journalists", Hurlbert successfully perpetrated one of the most difficult feats of historical license. He pretended to have been a diarist who never existed, and he covered his tracks so well that he escaped detection.

But Crofts also contends that Hurlbert's work was far from fictional—aside from the fabricated hocus-pocus regarding a nonexistent diarist. The Diary repeatedly introduces previously concealed information that was corroborated only after its publication. It contains precise details regarding the struggle to shape Lincoln’s cabinet. Its segments on the writing of Lincoln's inaugural address include key information that was not then part of the public realm—most notably, the role played by Seward in persuading Lincoln to make last-minute revisions. The diarist also shed light on Seward's secret promise to leading Virginia Unionists in mid-March 1861 that Fort Sumter soon would be evacuated. Although there was no diarist, the substance of the Diary appears reliable.

The Diary reflected Hurlbert's distinctive outlook, which was neither Northern nor Southern. Sooner than most Americans, he realized that his native South Carolina was on a collision course with New England, where he studied and lived from the mid-1840s to the mid-1850s. Although drawn for a time to the antislavery critique of the South, he had enough affinity with both sides of the sectional conflict to avoid becoming a partisan for either. He sensed that both sides were mutually blind to the potential catastrophe that their antagonism was creating.

Hurlbert remained conflicted after the war started. He wanted the Union preserved, but he feared that prolonged fighting would so embitter the two sides as to make reunion impossible. He opposed emancipation on grounds that it would prompt the South to fight longer and harder. When the war finally ended, he favored a rapid restoration of the Southern states to the Union. He never thought the war should have been fought, and he never accepted the idea that it could be justified by its outcome. He thereby swam against the dominant tide of postwar Northern public opinion. His alleged Diary suggested that Northern Democrats, conservative Republicans, and Southern Unionists had acted more responsibly in early 1861 than extreme men on either side, who blindly stumbled into the abyss.

The diary parallels the work of Mary Chesnut, the South Carolinian who transformed skeletal notations made during wartime into something more polished long after the fact. Her seeming diary was a memoir, historian C. Vann Woodward concluded, but "the facts bear her out" and her writing has "enduring value".
