= Samuel Ward Jr. =

Early American politician

Samuel Ward
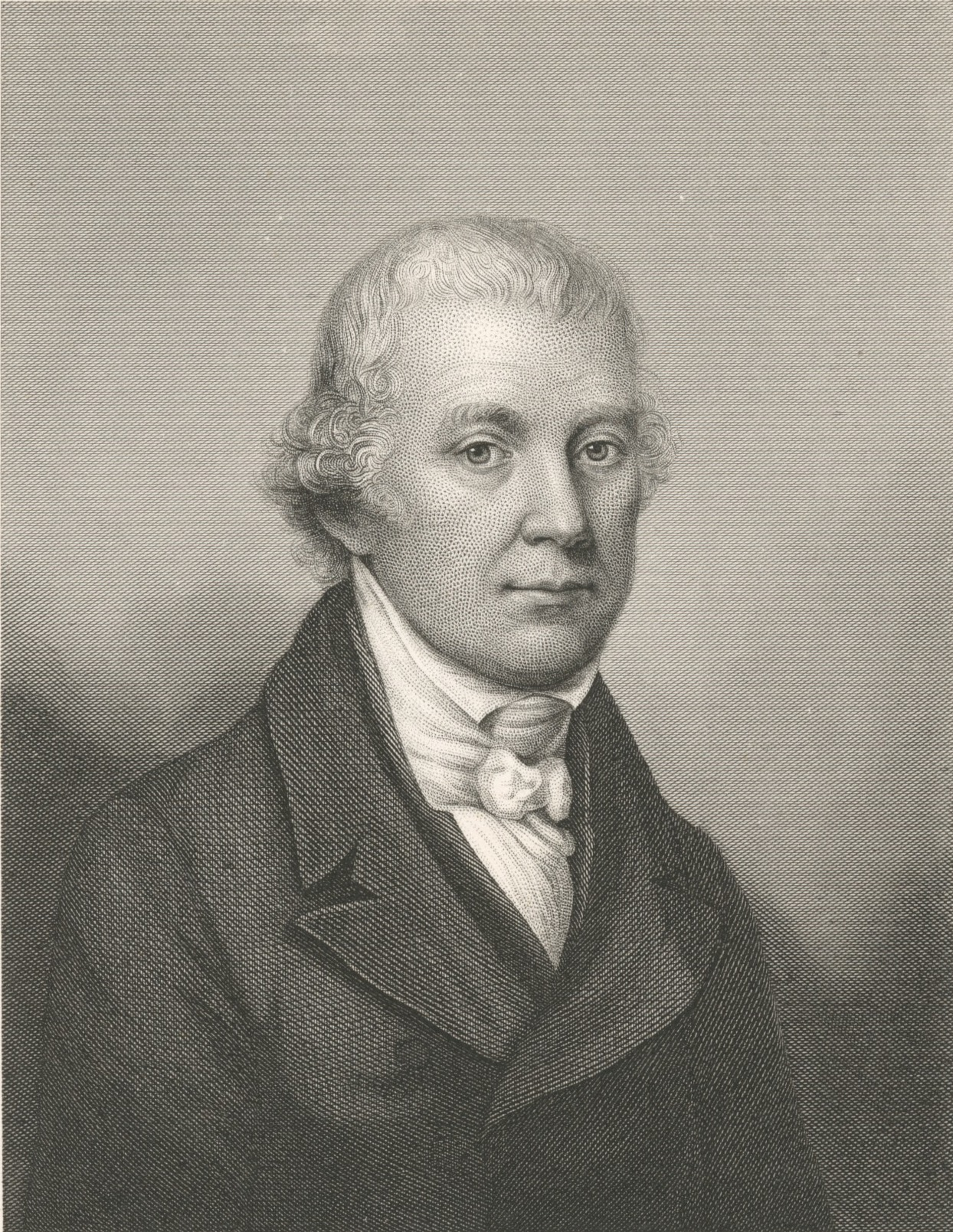
- Born: November 17, 1756; Westerly, Colony of Rhode Island and Providence Plantations
- Died: August 6, 1832 (aged 75); New York City, New York, U.S.
- Education: Brown University
- Spouse: Phebe Greene (m. 1778; died 1828)
- Children: Samuel Ward III; Richard Ray Ward
- Parent(s): Samuel Ward Sr. Anne Ray

Samuel Ward Jr. (November 17, 1756 – August 6, 1832) was an American Revolutionary War soldier, politician, and delegate to the secessionist Hartford Convention.

== Early life ==
Ward was born in Westerly, Rhode Island on November 17, 1756. He was the fifth child of Anne Ray and Samuel Ward, a founding trustee of Brown University, Continental Congress delegate and colonial governor of Rhode Island. Samuel graduated from Brown University with high honors, in 1771.

== Career ==
=== American Revolution ===
Ward was commissioned a captain in the Kings and Kent County militia in 1775 and served in that rank in the regiment under the command of Colonel Varnum when it was mobilized in April 1775. On May 3, 1775, Varnum's Regiment became part of the Army of Observation during the Siege of Boston.

Ward volunteered with 250 Rhode Islanders under Christopher Greene to support Benedict Arnold on his expedition to Quebec. Ward was captured, along with most members of the expedition, on the night of December 31, 1775 and was exchanged sometime in 1776.

Ward was promoted to a major of the 1st Rhode Island Regiment on January 12, 1777, and was promoted to lieutenant colonel on 5 May 1779 (with date of rank retroactive to May 26, 1778). With the 1st Rhode Island Regiment he fought at the Battle of Red Bank (October 1777) and the Battle of Rhode Island (August 1778).

=== Post war life ===
Ward retired from the Continental Army on January 1, 1781, when the 1st and 2nd Rhode Island Regiments were consolidated. In 1783 he became an original member of the Society of Cincinnati.

After the war, Ward became a merchant and traveled extensively to trade to Asia and Europe. Ward was elected to the Annapolis Convention (1786). In 1814, Ward was served as a delegate to the Hartford Convention. He was elected a member of the American Antiquarian Society in 1815.

== Personal life ==
In 1778 Ward married Phebe Greene (1760–1828), daughter of Governor William Greene Jr. Together, they were the parents of:

- Samuel Ward III (1786–1839), who married Julia Rush Cutler Ward (1796–1824).
- Richard Ray Ward (1795–1873)

Ward died on August 6, 1832, in New York City.
