= Amos Shartle Hershey =

American political scientist

Amos Shartle Hershey (1867–1933) was an American professor of political science.

== Biography ==
Born in Hockersville, Pennsylvania, Hershey received his education at Harvard College and Law School and also studied at the University of Heidelberg (Ph.D., 1894) and at the University of Paris (1894–95). While on the faculty of Indiana University, he served as assistant professor of political science (1895–1900), as associate professor of European history and politics (1900–05), and as professor of political science after 1905.

He was a member of the staff of the American Commission to Negotiate Peace, 1918–19.

== Works ==
Besides his contributions on political science and law he is author of:

- The International Law and Diplomacy of the Russo-Japanese War (1907)
- The Essentials of International Public Law (1912)
- Modern Japan, with Frank M. Anderson (1919)
- Anderson, Frank Maloy; Hershey, Amos Shartle (1918). Handbook for the Diplomatic History of Europe, Asia, and Africa 1870-1914. Washington, DC: National Board for Historical Service, Government Printing Office – via Internet Archive.
