= Cloch Labhrais =

"Speaking Stone": boulder in County Waterford, Ireland

Coordinates: 52.145979°N 7.510842°W

The Cloch Labhrais, also called the Answering Stone and the Speaking Stone, is a large glacial erratic boulder beside a road leading from Waterford to Dungarvan, 2 miles (3 km) from Stradbally, County Waterford in Ireland. The stone is the subject of a legend, much like the Blarney Stone. The most prominent and unique feature of the stone is a large, 5-foot-wide split (1.5 m) almost completely cleaving the stone in two. The large glacial boulder likely obtained the split when the glacial ice melted due to a rapid temperature change between the ice and the water of the stream.

== Size and placement ==
The boulder rests on the west bank of the River Deehan near Stradbally. It is split from North to South almost perfectly in the centre of the rock. The split itself, 5 feet (1.5 m) in width, cuts the stone into two parts: the eastern and western divisions.

=== Eastern half ===
The easternmost half of the boulder measures 33 feet (10 m) from the north to the south end. It is 11 feet (3.4 m) in height at the southern side of this section, 18 feet (5.5 m) high at the east side, 17 feet (5.2 m) high at the north side, and 12 feet (3.7 m) high at the split. From the eastern side to the split itself is 19.5 feet (5.9 m).

=== Western half ===
The other half of the boulder is 27 feet (8.2 m) from north to south. It is 15 feet (4.6 m) high at the southern end, 11 feet (3.4 m) at the west, 13 feet (4.0 m) high on the northern side, and it too is 12 feet (3.7 m) high at the split. From the western edge to the split measures 14 feet (4.3 m). A large piece of the western part broke off and fell to the northern end of the split, almost completely closing the split at that end. This segment alone weighs around four tons.

== Legend ==
There are several legends surrounding the stone, but almost all of them feature the stone revealing whether a person is lying. One version of the story tells of a disloyal young wife and her husband. The husband began to suspect that his wife and the man who was her lover may have had some indecent relationship. He took her out to the Answering Stone and told her to say whether or not she had betrayed him. The woman, having expected this, had secretly arranged for her lover to stand at the peak of a nearby mountain, where he would be in sight from their place at the stone, but far enough away that her husband would not recognize him. She said, "I had no more to do with the man that my husband suspects than with that man standing at the summit of this mountain!" The husband asked the stone if his wife was telling the truth, to which the stone replied that she was, but the truth was bitter. Since the stone had never before encountered such a misleading and deceitful form of trickery, only having been exposed to outright honesty or a simple lie, it was horrified with the woman's wickedness and split in half.

== See also ==
- Blarney Stone
- List of individual rocks
