= Samuel Ward Francis =

American inventor, physician, and writer

Samuel Ward Francis (December 26, 1835 – March 25, 1886) was an American writer, inventor, and medical doctor from New York. Among his inventions was an early typewriter and the spork.

== Bibliography ==
- Inside Out, a Curious Book by a Singular Man
- Life and Death (1870)
