= Frank Maloy Anderson =

- Born: February 3, 1871; Omaha, Nebraska, U.S.
- Died: April 26, 1961 (aged 90); Saint Paul, Minnesota, U.S.
- Resting place: Lakewood Cemetery

Frank Maloy Anderson (February 3, 1871 – April 26, 1961) was an author, historian and professor of history. He was born in Omaha, Nebraska and spent most of his adult life teaching and writing about American and Western European history. He was a prolific writer for The American Historical Review and is noted among American Civil War historians for his book The Diary of a Public Man.

== Life ==
He taught history at the University of Minnesota in Minneapolis from 1895 to 1896. The following year he attended Harvard University, Cambridge, Massachusetts from 1896 to 1897. He married his first wife Mary G. Steele in 1898, who died in 1938. Their marriage produced one son.

Maloy taught history at Dartmouth College, Hanover, N.H. from 1914 to 1941. He became a member and was Executive Council of the American Association of University Professors from 1917 to 1920. He was a member and eventual Executive Council of the American Historical Association from 1926 to 1928. In 1944 he married his second wife, Mary Maud Case.

In 1948 Anderson published Mystery of a "Public Man," a historical detective story regarding quotes made in a diary, known as The Diary of a Public Man, first published in a popular magazine in 1879, quoting people closely associated with Abraham Lincoln, Stephen A. Douglas and William H. Seward just before the Civil War broke out. The diary's publisher for reasons that are still disputed concealed the identity of its author and has been the center of much debate and controversy regarding the conclusions and surrounding history.

Anderson died at a nursing home in Saint Paul, Minnesota, on April 26, 1961. He is buried at Lakewood Cemetery in Minneapolis.

== Works ==
List of works by Frank Maloy Anderson

- Outlines and Documents of English Constitutional History During the Middle Ages (1895)
- Contemporary Opinion of the Virginia and Kentucky Resolutions, (1899)
- The Constitutions and Other Select Documents Illustrative of the History of France, 1789–1907 (1908)
- Mystery of a "Public Man," a Historical Detective Story
- Anderson, Frank Maloy; Hershey, Amos Shartle (1918). Handbook for the Diplomatic History of Europe, Asia, and Africa 1870-1914. Washington, DC: National Board for Historical Service, Government Printing Office – via Internet Archive.
- A Syllabus of Modern European History, 1500-1919. With Herbert Darling Foster and Charles Ramsdell Lingley (1919)
- Problems in banking and finance. With Isaac Hourwich (1902)

== See also ==
- James Kendall Hosmer American historian and librarian

== Sources ==
- "Frank Maloy Anderson". Google Analytic. Archived from the original on January 16, 2014.
- Anderson, Frank Maloy (1948). The Mystery of "a Public Man,": A Historical Detective Story. University of Minnesota Press, 1256 pages.
- The Diary of a Public Man. Unpublished Passages of the Secret History of the American Civil War. The North American Review, page range 125-140. 1879., E'book
- Ockerbloom, John Mark. "Online Books by Frank Maloy Anderson". The Online Books Page.
