= Julia Rush Cutler Ward =

American poet (1796–1824)

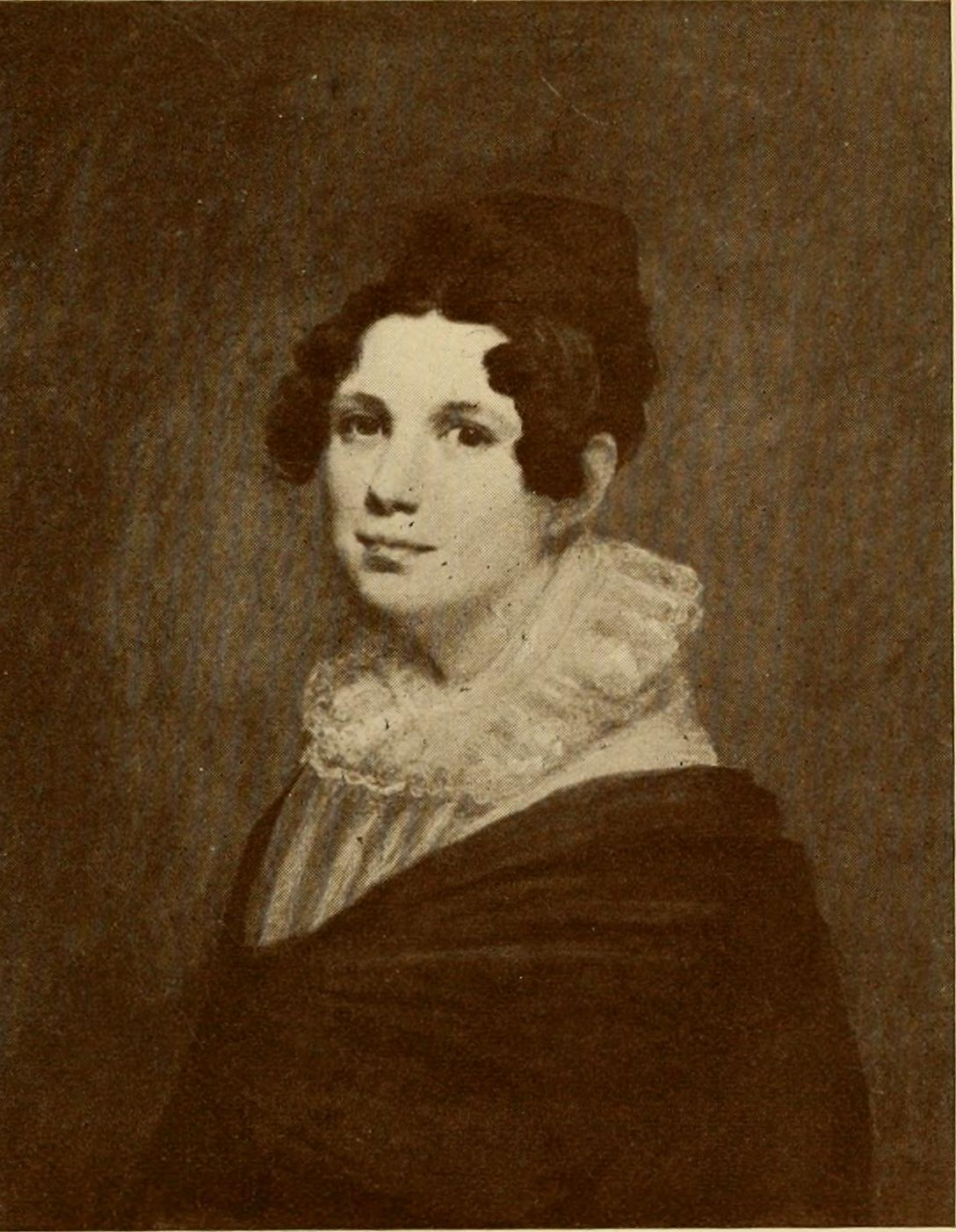
- Born: Julia Rush Cutler; January 5, 1796; Boston, Massachusetts, US
- Died: November 9, 1824 (aged 28); New York City, US
- Occupation: occasional poet
- Spouse: Samuel Ward (m. 1812)
- Children: Sam Cutler Ward; Julia Ward Howe
- Parent(s): Benjamin Clark Cutler; Sarah Marion Mitchell Hyrne Cutler
- Relatives: Francis Marion (great-uncle); Ward McAllister (nephew)

Julia Rush Cutler Ward (January 5, 1796 – November 9, 1824) was an American occasional poet. One of her poems is preserved in Rufus Wilmot Griswold's Female Poets of America (1878). Her daughter, Julia Ward Howe, was the author of the "Battle Hymn of the Republic".

== Early life ==
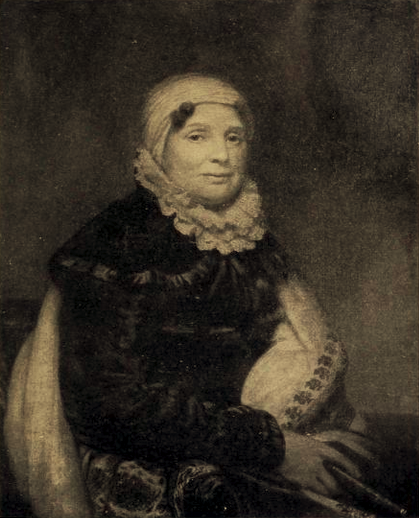
Ward's mother, Sarah Mitchell Cutler

Julia Rush Cutler was born in Boston, January 5, 1796. She was the daughter of Benjamin Clark Cutler (b. 1756), of Jamaica Plain, Massachusetts. Her mother, Sarah Marion Mitchell Hyrne Cutler, was the daughter of Thomas Mitchell and Esther (or Hester) Marion. Julia was the third child in the family. Her siblings included: Mary Ann, Mary Eliza, Rev. Benjamin Clark (of St. Ann's Church, Brooklyn; brother-in-law of General Sir Roger Hale Sheaffe), Charlotte, and Francis Marion.

Julia's maternal ancestors were of South Carolina, and her grandmother was the only sister of the partisan leader, General Francis Marion.

== Career ==
In 1812, she married Samuel Ward, a banker of New York City. After marriage, she came to New York City to reside at a time when Washington Irving, James Kirke Paulding, James Fenimore Cooper, and others, were making their first marks in literature, and her abilities, improved by the best culture, brought into her circle important people of the city.

Ward wrote occasional poems with grace, sincerity, and an impromptu ease. One of her poems is preserved in Griswold's Female Poets of America (Philadelphia, 1878).

== Personal life ==
On October 9, 1812, at the age of seventeen, she married Samuel Ward, head of the banking house of Prime, Ward & King, and as such was the most influential financier in America, enjoying a position of power and influence equal to that of J. Pierpont Morgan seventy years later. In the financial panic of 1837, Ward played a like part to that of Morgan in the panic of 1907.

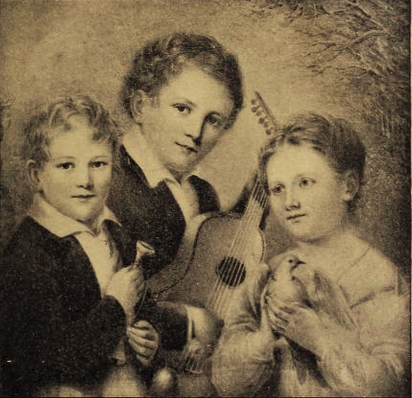
Ward's children, Henry, Samuel, Julia (l-r)

The Wards had seven children including:

- Samuel ("Sam") Cutler Ward (1814–1884), a lobbyist who married Emily Astor (1819–1841), daughter of William Backhouse Astor Sr.
- Julia (b. 1816; died in infancy)
- Henry Ward (1818–1839/40)
- Julia Ward Howe (1819–1910), author of "Battle Hymn of the Republic", who married Samuel Gridley Howe (1801–1876)
- Francis Marion (1820–1847)
- Louisa Cutler Ward (1823–1897), who married Thomas Gibson Crawford (1813–1857), a prominent sculptor. After his death, she married Luther Terry (1813–1900), an artist.
- Anne Eliza Ward Maillard (born November 2, 1824)

On a north corner of Broadway stood the Ward house, a plain but dignified structure of brick with white marble trimmings. In 1819, the family lived at No. I Marketfield Street, on the north side, next to the corner of Broad Street. The family moved next to No. 5 Bowling Green, the "Steamship Row" of later days, where they had as neighbors John Hone, Elisha Riggs, and Stephen Whitney.

Ward died November 9, 1824, at her Bowling Green home in New York City a week after her last child, Anne, was born.
