= Samuel Ward (banker) =

American banker (1786–1839)

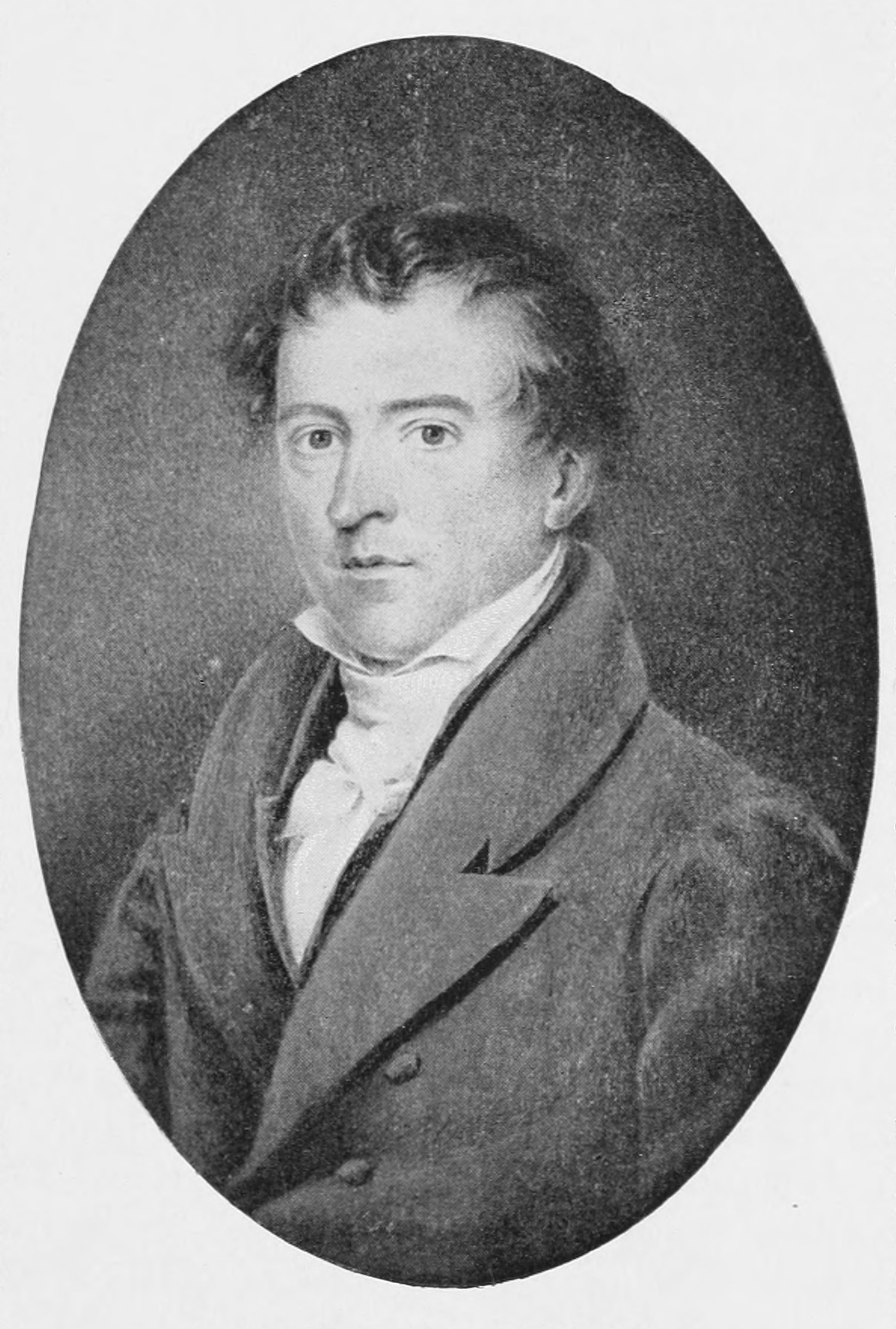
- Born: Samuel Ward III; May 1, 1786; Rhode Island, U.S.
- Died: November 27, 1839 (aged 53); New York City, U.S.
- Spouse: Julia Rush Cutler (m. 1812; died 1824)
- Children: 3, including Samuel IV and Julia
- Parent(s): Samuel Ward Jr. Phebe Greene
- Relatives: Samuel Ward Sr. (grandfather); William Greene Jr.

Samuel Ward III (May 1, 1786 – November 27, 1839) was an American banker.

== Early life ==
Samuel Ward III was born in Rhode Island on May 1, 1786. He was the son of Samuel Ward Jr. (1756–1832) and Phebe Greene. His paternal grandparents were Samuel Ward Sr. (1725–1776) and Anne Ray. His maternal grandparents were William Greene (1731–1809) and Catharine Ray.

== Career ==
After his education he entered a banking house as a clerk, and in 1808 was taken into partnership, continuing as a member of the firm of Prime, Ward & King until his death. In 1838, he secured through the Bank of England a loan of nearly $5,000,000 to enable the banks to resume specie payments, and established the Bank of Commerce, becoming its president.

He was a founder of the University of the City of New York (now New York University) and of the New York Temperance Society, of which he was the first president, and was active in organizing mission churches. He was a patron of many charities and the giver of large sums in aid of Protestant Episcopal Churches and colleges in the west. He lived at the corner of Fourth Street and Broadway.

== Personal life ==
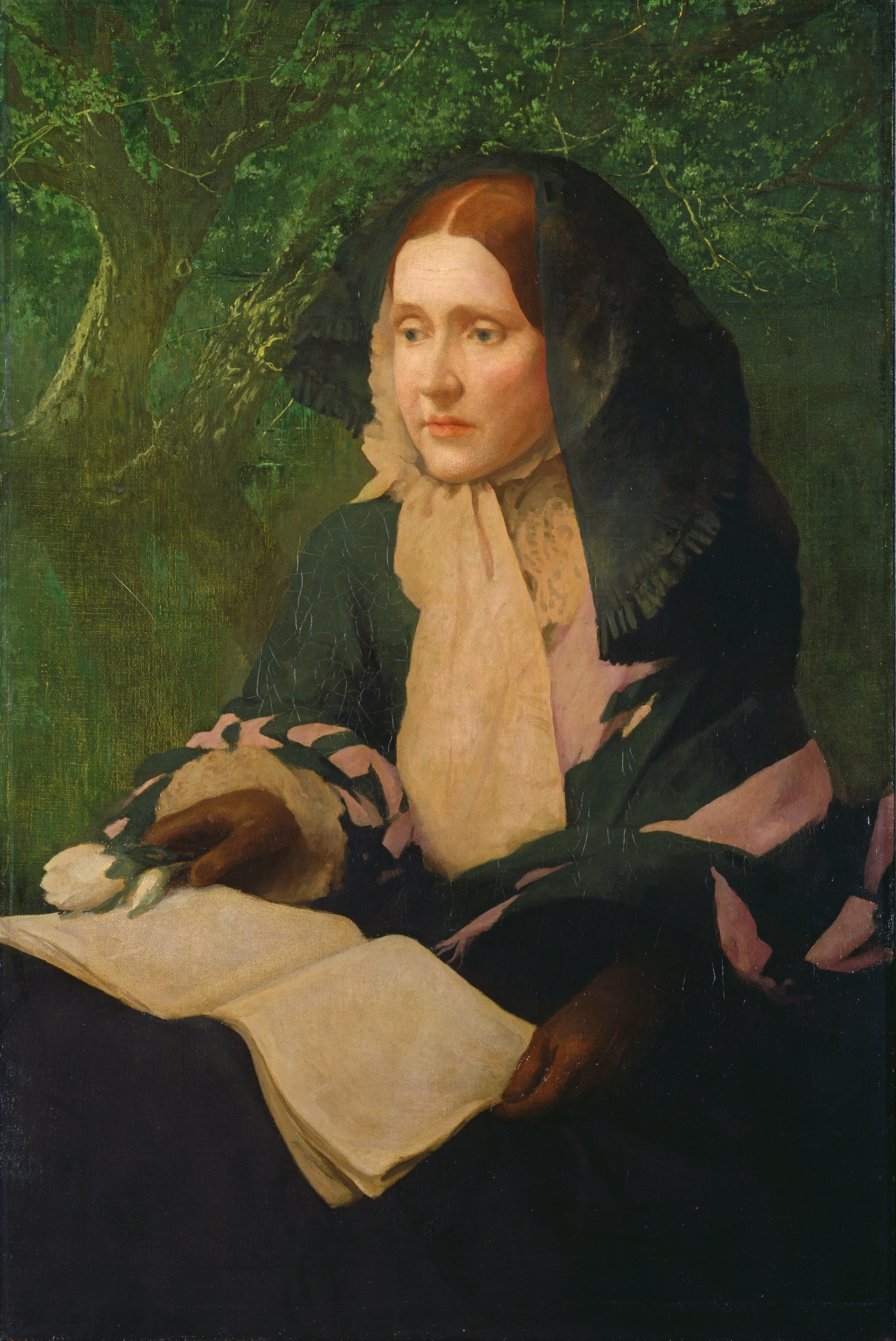
Portrait of Ward's daughter, Julia Ward Howe, by John Elliott, 1925

In October 1812, he married Julia Rush Cutler, and, through her mother, a grandniece of Francis Marion. Julia was a poet, and one of her poems is preserved in Rufus Wilmot Griswold's Female Poets of America (Philadelphia, 1848). They had seven children:

- Samuel Cutler "Sam" Ward (1814–1884), a lobbyist who married Emily Astor (1819–1841), daughter of William Backhouse Astor Sr.
- Henry Ward (1818–1839)
- Julia Ward (1819–1910), a poet who married Samuel Gridley Howe (1801–1876)
- Louisa Cutler Ward (1823–1897), who married Thomas Gibson Crawford (1813–1857), a prominent sculptor. After his death, she married Luther Terry (1813–1900), an artist.
- Francis Marion (1820–1847)
- Louisa Cutler (1823–1857)
- Anne Eliza Ward (November 2, 1824 - April 7, 1895), who married Adolph Maillard, a racehorse breeder. They became founding settlers of the San Geronimo Valley in Marin County, California.

=== Descendants ===
His son, Sam Ward, had two children with Emily Astor before her death. Their only surviving daughter, Margaret Astor Ward, married John Winthrop Chanler, son of John White Chanler and Elizabeth Shirreff Winthrop, and had eleven children, including William A. Chanler, Lewis Stuyvesant Chanler, and Robert Winthrop Chanler. After Emily's death, Sam married again and had two more children with his second wife, Medora Grymes, who both died in the 1860s.

His daughter, Julia gave birth to six children: Julia Romana Howe (1844–1886), Florence Marion Howe (1845–1922), Henry Marion Howe (1848–1922), Laura Elizabeth Howe (1850–1943), Maud Howe (1855–1948), and Samuel Gridley Howe Jr. (1858–1863). Julia was likewise an aunt of novelist Francis Marion Crawford.
