= Samuel Ward (Rhode Island politician) =

American farmer, politician, and jurist

Samuel Ward Sr.
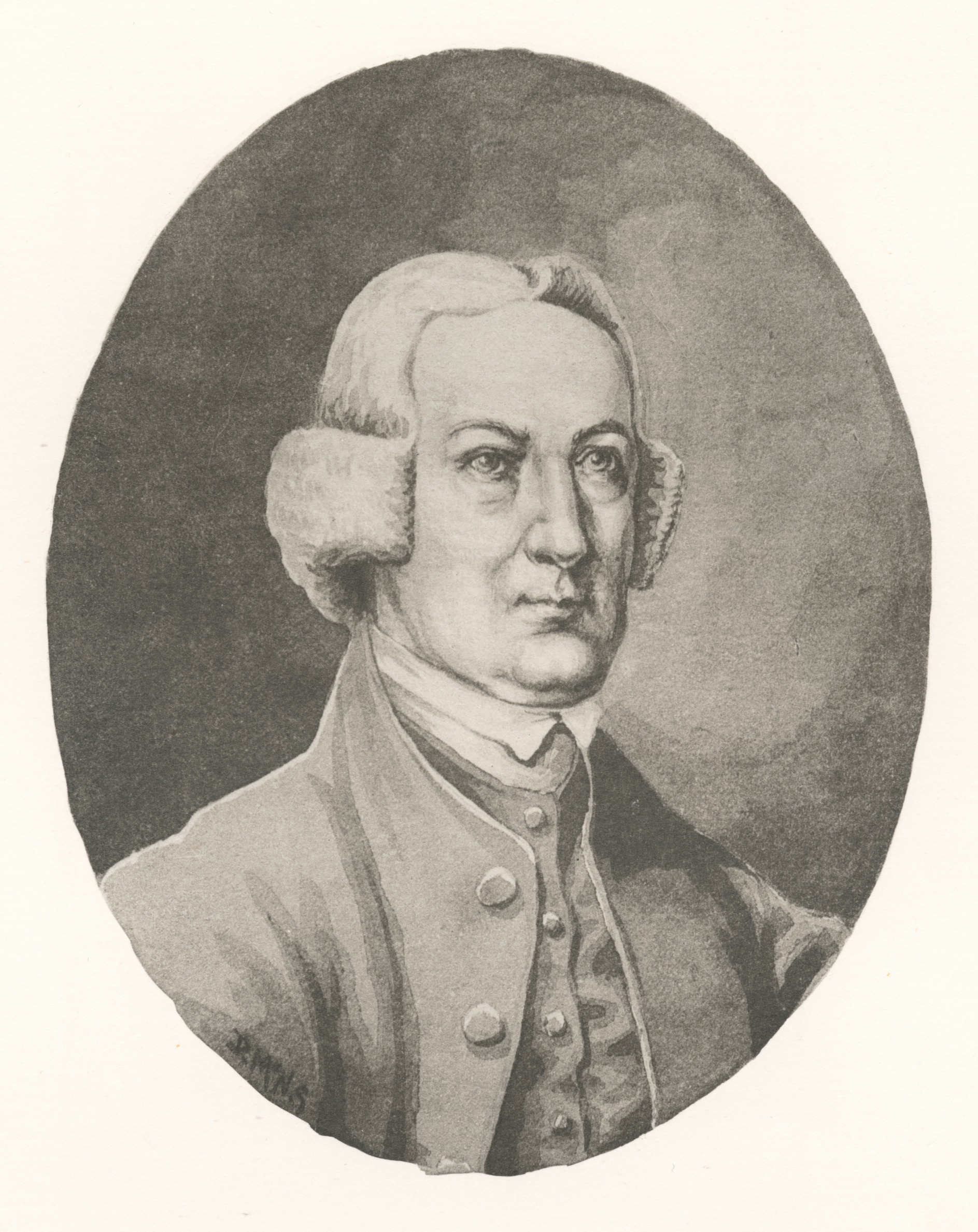
- Samuel Ward

31st and 33rd Governor of the Colony of Rhode Island and Providence Plantations
- In office 1762–1763
- Preceded by: Stephen Hopkins
- Succeeded by: Stephen Hopkins
- In office 1765–1767
- Preceded by: Stephen Hopkins
- Succeeded by: Stephen Hopkins

7th Chief Justice of the Rhode Island Supreme Court
- In office May 1761 – May 1762
- Preceded by: John Gardner
- Succeeded by: Jeremiah Niles

Personal details
- Born: May 25, 1725 Newport, Rhode Island
- Died: March 26, 1776 (aged 50) Philadelphia, Pennsylvania
- Resting place: Common Burying Ground, Newport
- Spouse: Anne Ray
- Parent(s): Richard Ward, Mary Tillinghast
- Occupation: Farmer, Politician, Chief Justice, Governor

Samuel Ward Sr. (May 25, 1725 – March 26, 1776) was an American farmer, politician, Rhode Island Supreme Court justice, governor of the Colony of Rhode Island and Providence Plantations, and delegate to the Continental Congress where he signed the Continental Association. He was the son of Rhode Island Governor Richard Ward, was well-educated, and grew up in a large family in Newport, Rhode Island. He and his wife received property in Westerly, Rhode Island from his father-in-law, and the couple settled there and took up farming. He entered politics as a young man and soon took sides in the hard money vs. paper money controversy, favoring hard money or specie. His primary rival over the money issue was Providence politician Stephen Hopkins, and the two men became bitter rivals; the two also alternated as governors of the colony for several terms.

During this time of political activity, Ward became a founder and trustee of Brown University. The most contentious issue that he faced during his three years as governor involved the Stamp Act, which had been passed by the British Parliament just before he took office for the second time. The Stamp Act placed a tax on all official documents and newspapers, infuriating the American colonists by being done without their consent. Representatives of the colonies met to discuss the act, but when it came time for the governors to take a position, Ward was the only one who stood firm against it, threatening his position but bringing him recognition as a great Patriot.

Ward's final term as governor ended in 1767, after which he retired to work on his farm in Westerly. On August 5, 1769, he was baptized at the age of 44 in the old church of Westerly as a Seventh Day Baptist.

He was called back into service in 1774 as a delegate to the Continental Congress. War was looming with England, and to this end he devoted all of his energy. After hostilities began, Ward stated, "'Heaven save my country,' is my first, my last, and almost my only prayer." He died of smallpox during a meeting of the Congress in Philadelphia, three months before the signing of the Declaration of Independence, and was buried in a local cemetery. His remains were later re-interred in the Common Burying Ground in Newport.

== Ancestry and early life ==
Ward was born in Newport in the Colony of Rhode Island and Providence Plantations in 1725, the son of Rhode Island Colonial Governor Richard Ward. His mother Mary Tillinghast was the daughter of John Tillinghast and Isabel Sayles, and a granddaughter of Pardon Tillinghast who had come from Seven Cliffs, Sussex, England. She was a granddaughter of John Sayles and Mary Williams, and a great-granddaughter of Rhode Island founder Roger Williams, making Ward the great-great-grandson of the colony's founder. Ward's great-grandfather John Ward was born in Gloucester, England and had been an officer in Oliver Cromwell's army, but he came to the American colonies following the accession of King Charles II.

Ward was the ninth of 14 children. He grew up in a home of liberal tastes and cultivated manners, and he was trained under the discipline and instruction of a celebrated grammar school in his home town. He may also have been tutored by his older brother Thomas, who had graduated from Harvard College in 1733. As a young man, Ward married Anne Ray, the daughter of a well-to-do farmer on Block Island, from whom the couple received land in Westerly where they settled as farmers. He devoted much effort to improving the breeds of domestic animals, and he raised a breed of racehorse known as the Narraganset Pacer.

== Family and legacy ==
Samuel and Anna Ward had 11 children. Their second son Samuel Ward Jr. served as the lieutenant colonel of the 1st Rhode Island Regiment in the Continental Army. A great-granddaughter was Julia Ward Howe who composed the "Battle Hymn of the Republic". Ward's aunt Mary Ward married Sion Arnold, a grandson of Governor Benedict Arnold.

In 1937, the town of Westerly honored Ward's memory by dedicating its high school to him. It was renamed Westerly High School in the late 20th century, but the main auditorium was given his name.

Ancestors of Samuel Ward (Rhode Island politician)

8. John Ward (1619–1698)
4. Thomas Ward (1641–1689)
2. Richard Ward (1689–1763)
10. Samuel Billings
5. Amey Billings (1658–1732)
11. Seaborn Tew (born 1640)
1. Samuel Ward (1725–1776)
12. Pardon Tillinghast (1622–1718)
6. John Tillinghast (1657–1690)
13. Sarah Butterworth
3. Mary Tillinghast (1689–1767)
14. John Sayles (1623–1681)
7. Isabel Sayles (died after 1716)
15. Mary Williams (1633–1681)

== Political life ==
Ward first became active in politics in 1756 when he was elected as a deputy from Westerly. The divisive political issue of the day was the use of hard money (or specie) versus paper money, and Ward sided with the specie group. His chief rival was Stephen Hopkins of Providence who sided with paper money. So bitter was the animosity between these two men that Hopkins commenced an action for slander against Ward. The case was moved to Massachusetts for a fair trial, and the judgment went against Hopkins by default in 1759.

For ten years, the two men went back and forth as governor of the colony, each at the head of a powerful party. Josias Lyndon was elected as a compromise candidate in 1768, and the constant butting heads stopped. Hopkins won the election as governor in 1758 and beat Ward again in the following three elections. In 1761, the Assembly named Ward to the office of chief justice of the Rhode Island Supreme Court, but he only served in this capacity for a year, finally being elected governor in 1762. During his first year in office, Ward supported the idea of establishing a college in Rhode Island Colony, and he took an active part in the establishment of "Rhode island College," later Brown University. The school was incorporated in 1765 and he was one of the trustees and one of its most generous supporters.

=== Stamp Act ===
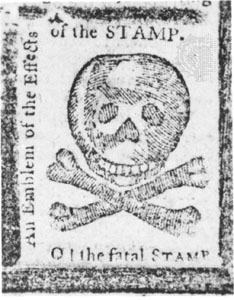
Colonial newspaper critique of Stamp Act

In 1763, Hopkins once again beat out Ward in the election for governor, serving for the next two years. However, in 1765, Ward won the contest for the second time. During this term, one of the most contentious issues of the age arose, uniting the divided elements into a common cause when both houses of the British Parliament passed the Stamp Act. This act was a scheme for taxing the colonies, directing that all commercial and legal documents must be written on stamped paper sold at fixed prices by governmental officers, and also directing that a duty be applied to newspapers. Parliament assumed the right to tax the colonies and put additional duties on sugar, coffee, and other articles. The government also required that lumber and iron from the colonies be exported solely to England.

The news of the act infuriated the colonists. Samuel Adams of Massachusetts invited all the colonies to a congress of delegates to meet in New York to discuss relief from the unjust taxes. In August 1765, the Rhode Island General Assembly passed resolutions following the lead of Patrick Henry of Virginia. Rhode Island's appointed stamp distributor was Attorney General Augustus Johnson, but he refused to execute his office "against the will of our Sovereign Lord the People." The Rhode Island General Assembly met again at East Greenwich in September 1765, choosing delegates to the New York congress and appointing a committee to consider the Stamp Act. The committee reported six resolutions that pointed to the absolution of allegiance to the British Crown unless the grievances were removed.

The day before the act was to become effective, all of the royal governors took an oath to sustain it. Among the colonial governors, only Samuel Ward of Rhode Island refused the act. In so doing, he forfeited his position and was threatened with a huge fine, but this did not deter him. The act was ultimately repealed, with news reaching the colonies in May 1766 to public rejoicing. The conflict for independence was delayed but not abandoned.

=== Continental Congress ===
"When I first entered this contest with Great Britain, I extended my view through the various scenes which my judgment or imagination pointed out to me. I saw clearly that the last act of this cruel tragedy would close in fields of blood. I have traced the progress of this unnatural war through burning towns, devastation of the country and every subsequent evil. I have realized with regard to myself, the bullet, the bayonet, and the halter; and, compared with the immense object I have in view, they are all less than nothing. ... Heaven save my country, is my first, my last, and almost my only prayer."

— Samuel Ward

In the 1767 election, Ward once again lost to his nemesis, but Hopkins would not seek re-election after 1768. Eventually, the two great rivals established friendly relations. The famous controversy was replaced by a more momentous struggle soon to involve the colony. Governor Ward retired to his estate in Westerly but became active again in 1774. At a town meeting in May of that year, the freemen of Providence formally proposed a Continental Congress for the union of the colonies, the first such act in favor of this measure, though the idea had already been circulating in several of the colonies. As plans solidified, the General Assembly met the following month in Newport and elected Ward and Hopkins as delegates.

Ward served on several important committees, including the Committee on Secrets, and he was a delegate when the Congress met as a committee of the whole. He devoted all of his energy to the Continental Congress, until his untimely death from smallpox at a meeting of the convention in Philadelphia. Ward died a little more than three months before the Declaration of Independence was signed. He was originally buried in Philadelphia but was reinterred in the Common Burying Ground in Newport, Rhode Island in 1860.

== See also ==
- Stamp Act Congress
- List of delegates to the Continental Congress
- List of colonial governors of Rhode Island
- List of lieutenant governors of Rhode Island
- List of chief justices of the Rhode Island Supreme Court
- Colony of Rhode Island and Providence Plantations
